= British industrial architecture =

Architecture of industries in UK

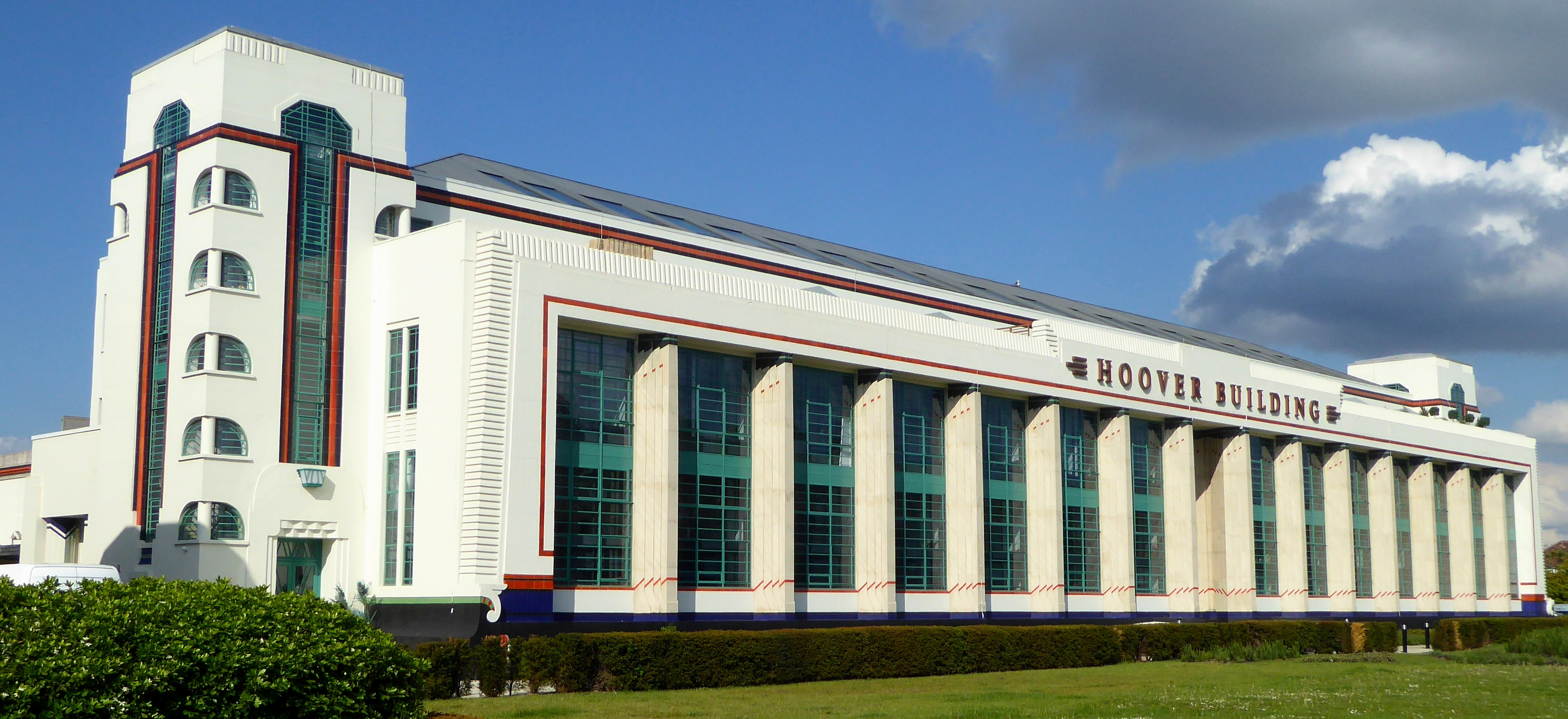
Art Deco and "Bypass Modern": the Hoover Building by Wallis, Gilbert and Partners on the A40 main road in Perivale, London, 1932–1935 has aroused varying responses over the years.

British industrial architecture has been created, mainly from 1700 onwards, to house industries of many kinds in Britain, home of the Industrial Revolution in this period. Both the new industrial technologies and industrial architecture soon spread worldwide. As such, the architecture of surviving industrial buildings records part of the history of the modern world.

Some industries were immediately recognisable by the functional shapes of their buildings, as with glass cones and the bottle kilns of potteries. The transport industry was supported first by the growth of a network of canals, then of a network of railways, contributing landmark structures such as the Pontcysyllte Aqueduct and the Ribblehead Viaduct.

New materials made available in large quantities by the newly-developed industries enabled novel types of construction, including reinforced concrete and steel. Industrial architects freely explored a variety of styles for their buildings, from Egyptian Revival to medieval castle, English country house to Venetian Gothic. Others sought to impress with scale, such as with tall chimneys as at the India Mill, Darwen. Some directly celebrated the modern, as with the "heroic" Power House, Chiswick, complete with statues of "Electricity" and "Locomotion". In the 20th century, long white "By-pass modern" company headquarters such as the Art Deco Hoover Building were conspicuously placed beside major roads out of London.

== Industrial revolution ==
=== Early works ===
From around 1700, Abraham Darby I made Coalbrookdale the focus of the Industrial Revolution with the production of goods made of cast iron, from cooking pots upwards. His descendant Abraham Darby III made and assembled the sections of The Iron Bridge across the Coalbrookdale Gorge. The company's Bedlam Furnaces were depicted in Philip de Loutherbourg's 1801 painting Coalbrookdale by Night. The Iron Bridge influenced engineers and architects around the world, and was the first of many large cast iron structures. The gorge is now a World Heritage site.

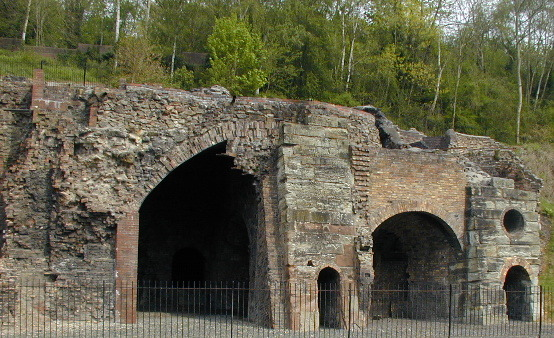
Remains of Abraham Darby's Bedlam Furnaces, Coalbrookdale, built c. 1700

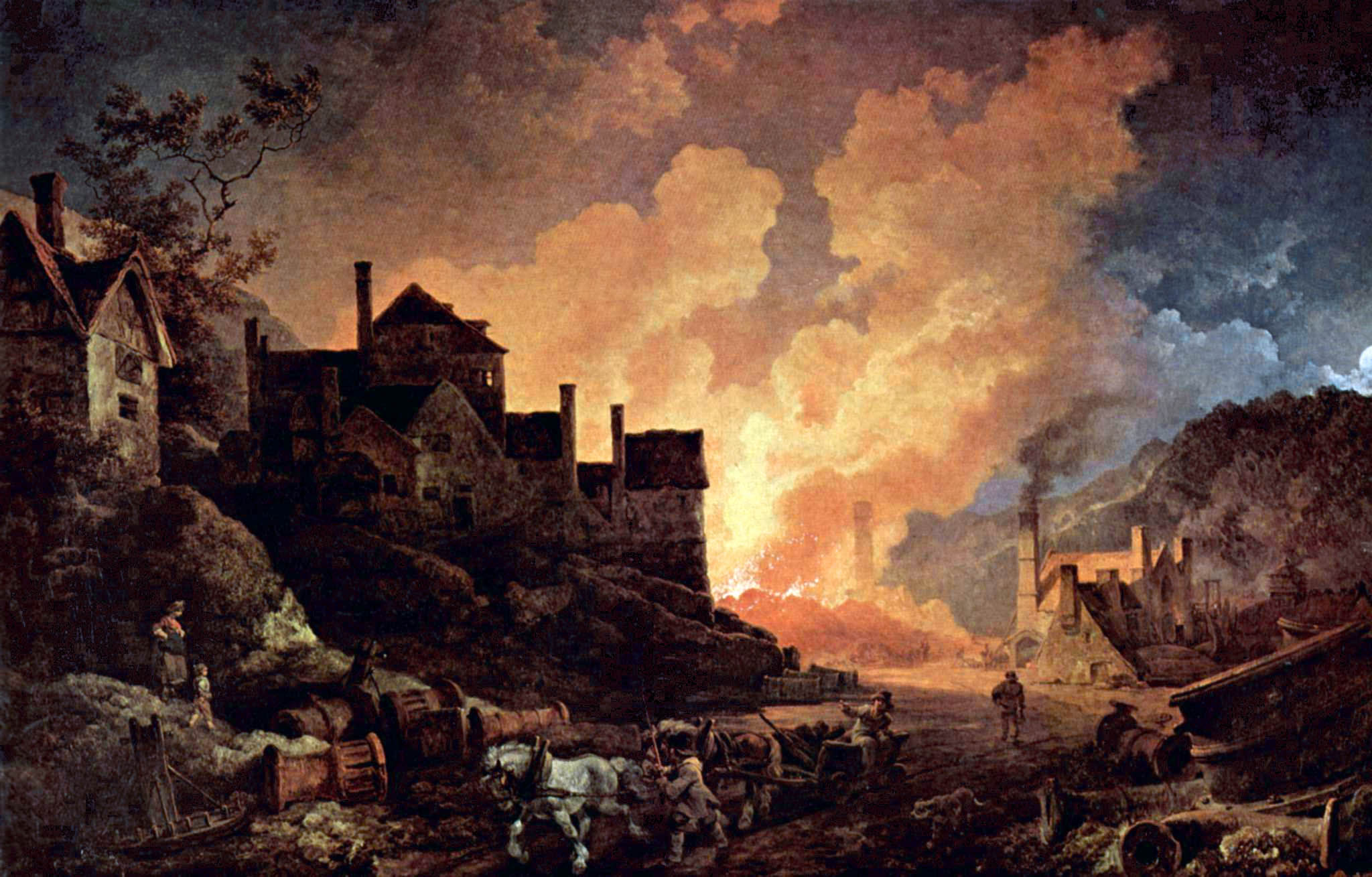
Coalbrookdale by Night
by Philip de Loutherbourg, 1801

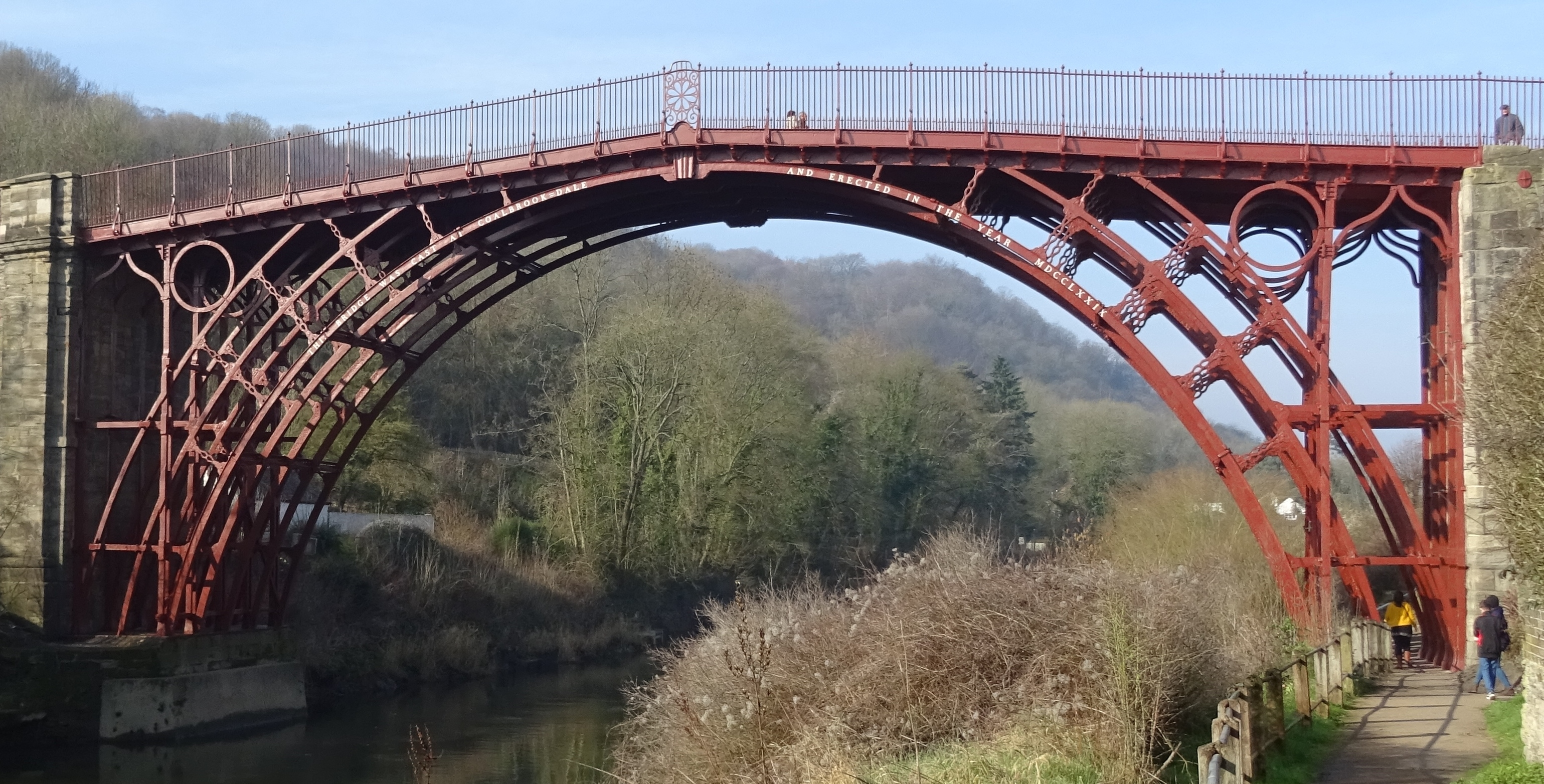
The Iron Bridge, designed by Thomas Farnolls Pritchard, built 1777–9 using iron sections cast at Coalbrookdale

=== Growth ===
From 1700, Britain's economy was transformed by industrialisation, growth in trade, and numerous discoveries and inventions, making it the first country to take this step. The working population grew rapidly, especially in the north of England. The Industrial Revolution brought large-scale iron smelting using coke, iron puddling, steam engines, and machine production of textiles. Work was organised in factories that operated several processes on a single site. Some industries, such as steelmaking in Sheffield and textile manufacture in Lancashire, have left substantial surviving buildings; others such as mining and industrial chemistry have left scant remnants. Agricultural processing used corn mills, malt houses, breweries and tanneries; these advanced technically but did not create many large buildings because the industry was evenly distributed across the country, though multi-storey corn mills appeared around 1800 as war raised grain prices. Murrays' Mills, Manchester was begun in 1798, forming the longest mill range in the world; the cotton mills were conveniently placed on the Rochdale Canal, giving access to the 18th century industrial transport network.

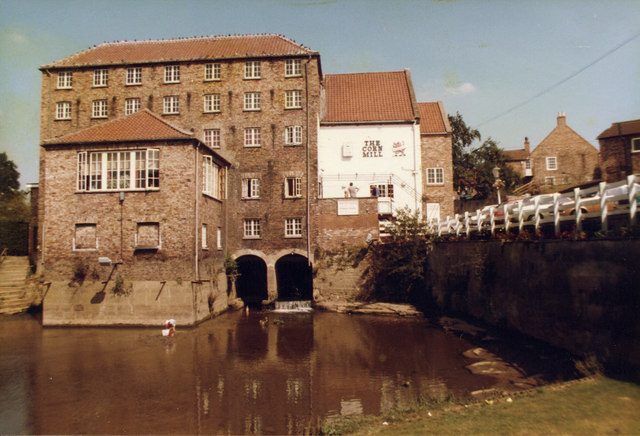
The multi-storey corn mill, Stamford Bridge, c. 1800

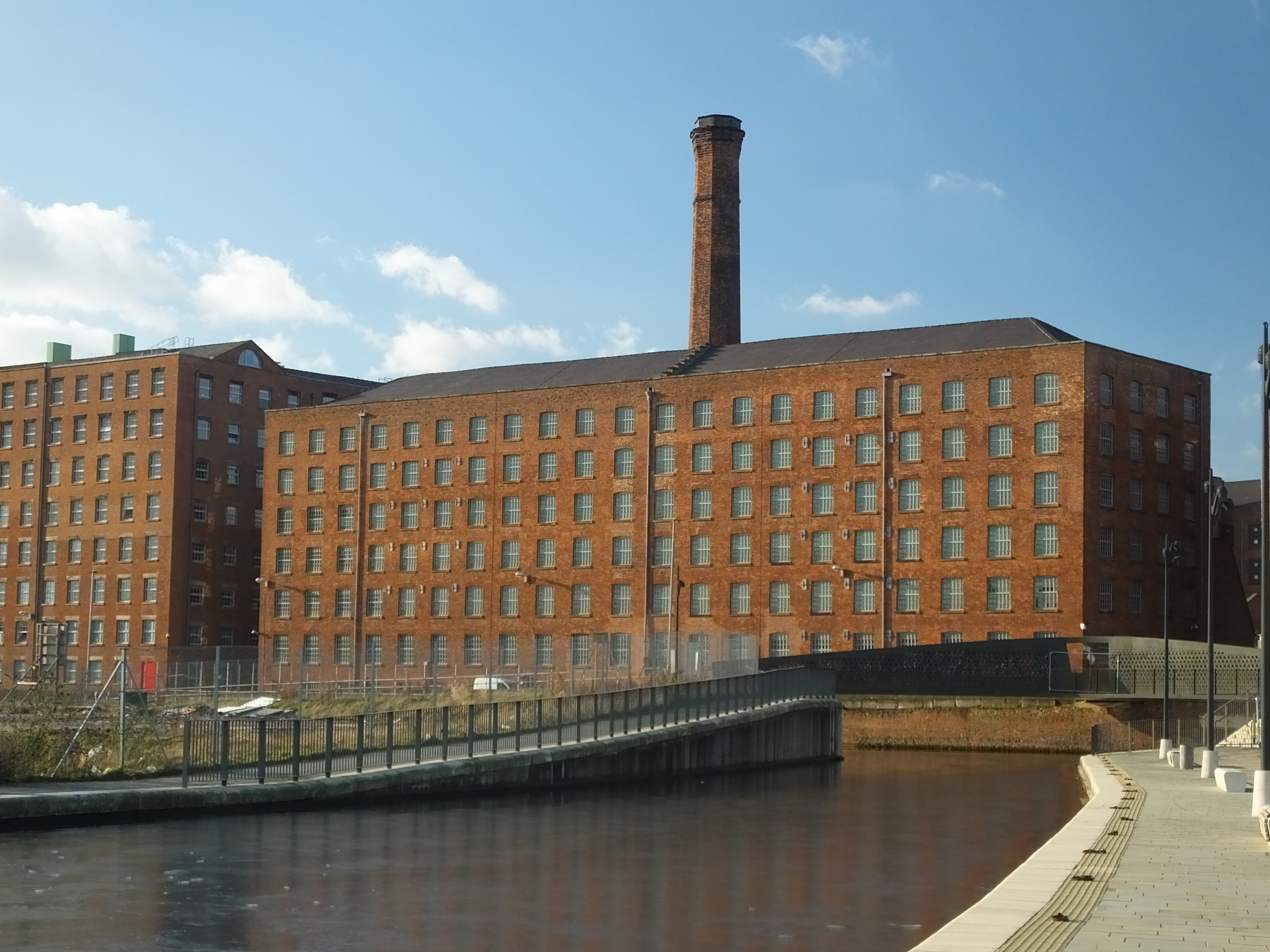
Murrays' Mills (for cotton) on the Rochdale Canal, Manchester, begun in 1798, and then forming the longest mill range in the world

=== Transport network ===
Industrial growth was accompanied and assisted by the rapid development of a nationwide canal network able to carry heavy goods of all kinds. Canals were cut so as to connect producers to their customers, for example the 1794 Glamorganshire Canal linking the Welsh ironworks at Merthyr Tydfil to the harbour at Cardiff. This spurred rapid industrialisation of the South Wales Valleys. The engineer Thomas Telford undertook some major canal works, including between 1795 and 1805 the 126 feet (38 m) high Pontcysyllte Aqueduct that enables the Llangollen Canal to cross the River Dee, Wales, and between 1803 and 1822 the Caledonian Canal linking a chain of freshwater lochs across Scotland with the enormous Neptune's Staircase, a series of eight large locks, each 180 feet (55 m) long by 40 feet (12 m) wide, that together enable barges to climb 64 feet (20 m).

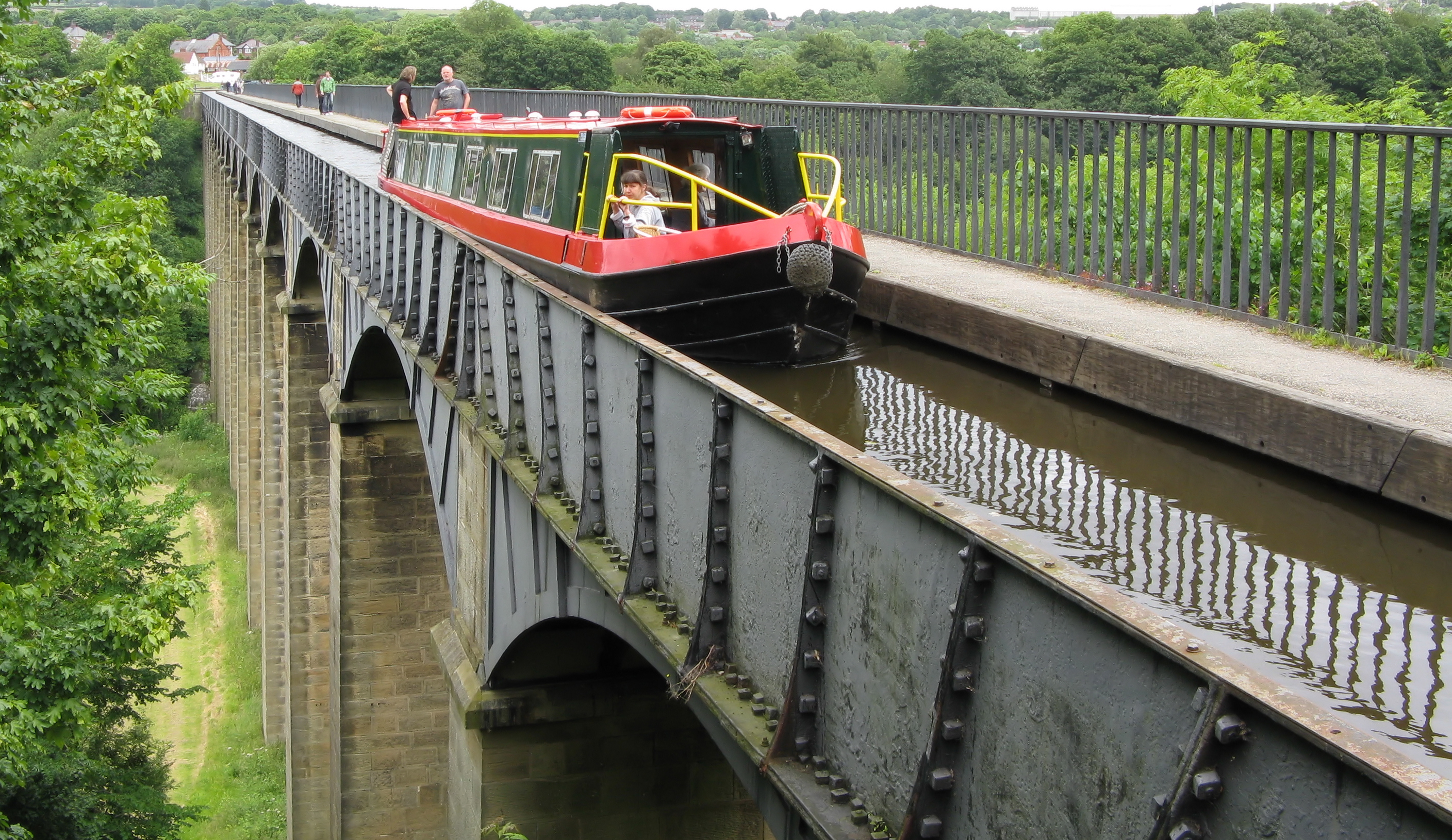
Thomas Telford's Pontcysyllte Aqueduct over the River Dee, Wales, 1795–1805

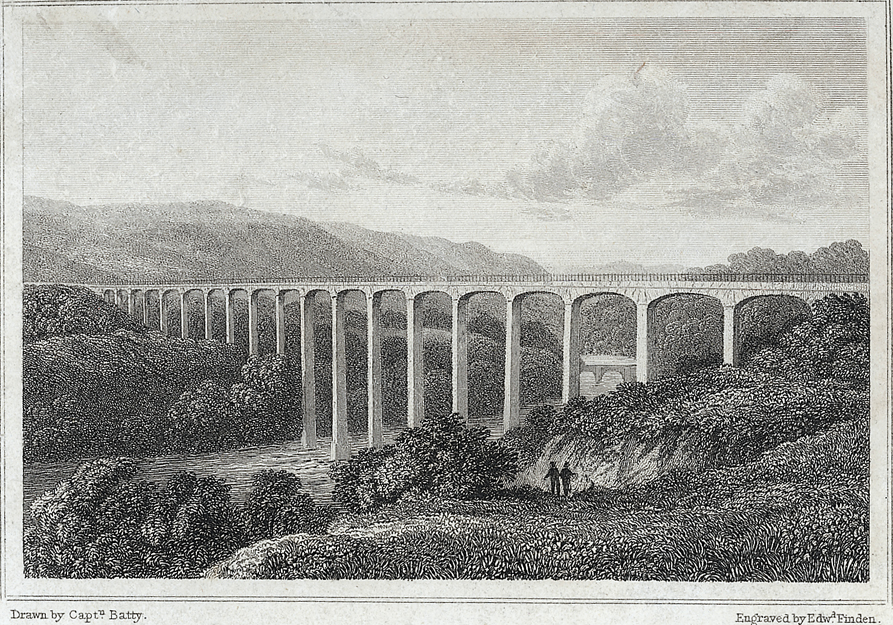
Pontcysyllte Aqueduct engraved by Edward Francis Finden from a drawing by Robert Batty, 1823

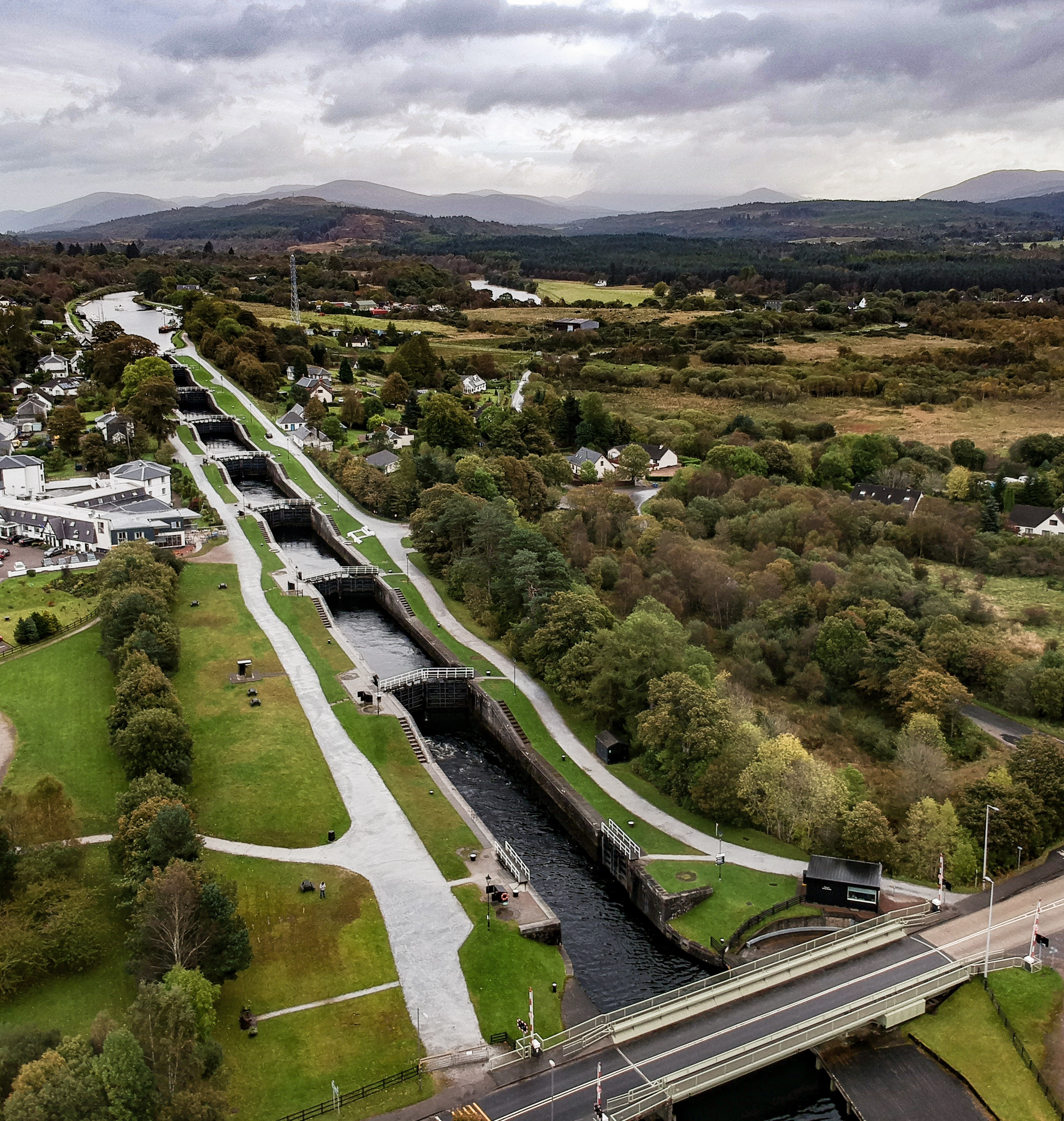
Telford's Neptune's Staircase of 8 locks on the Caledonian Canal, 1803–1822

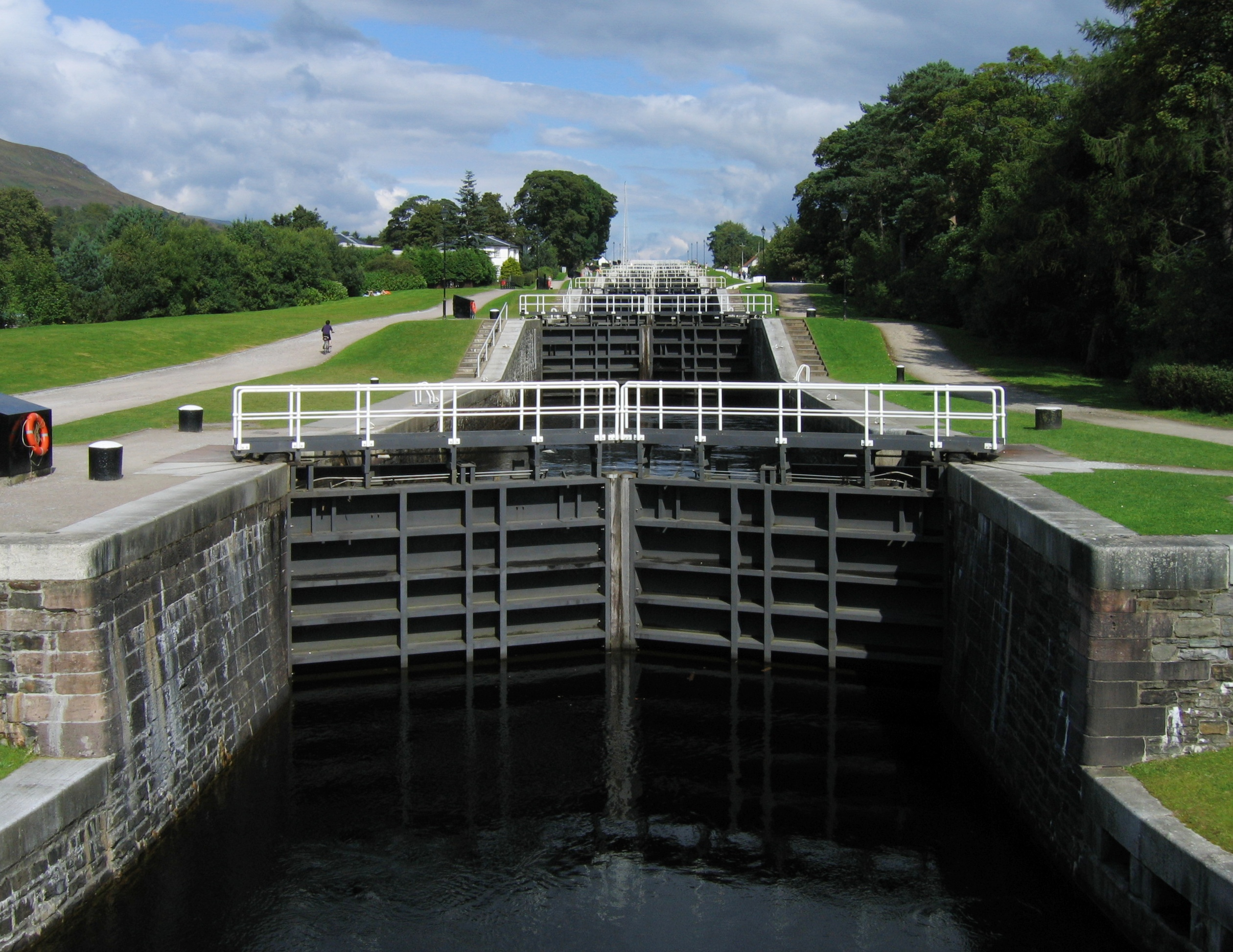
View up Neptune's Staircase from near Loch Linnhe

=== Shipbuilding ===
Chatham Dockyard on the River Medway in Kent constructed and equipped ships of the Royal Navy from the time of Henry VIII for more than 400 years, using the most advanced technology for its ships and its industrial buildings.

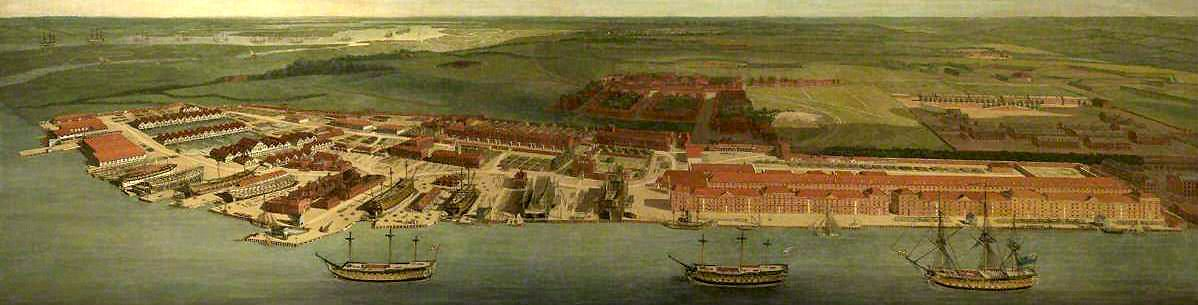
Chatham Dockyard: from right to left (south to north) on river bank are: two Anchor Wharf Storehouses (Rope House behind); two shipbuilding slips (and Commissioner's House with garden, and beyond, Sail and Colour Loft); two dry docks (Clock Tower Storehouse behind); the old Smithery; two more dry docks (and beyond, Masthouses and Mouldloft); more building slips and Boat Houses. In the distance, ships at anchor on Gillingham Reach. Painting by Joseph Farington, 1785.

No. 3 covered slip in Chatham Dockyard provides a roof over a shipbuilding slipway, enabling the timbers of the ship under construction to stay dry and sound, unlike traditional outdoor construction. Its wooden roof trusses were built in 1838. No. 7 covered slip, built in 1852, is one of the earliest metal trussed roofs.

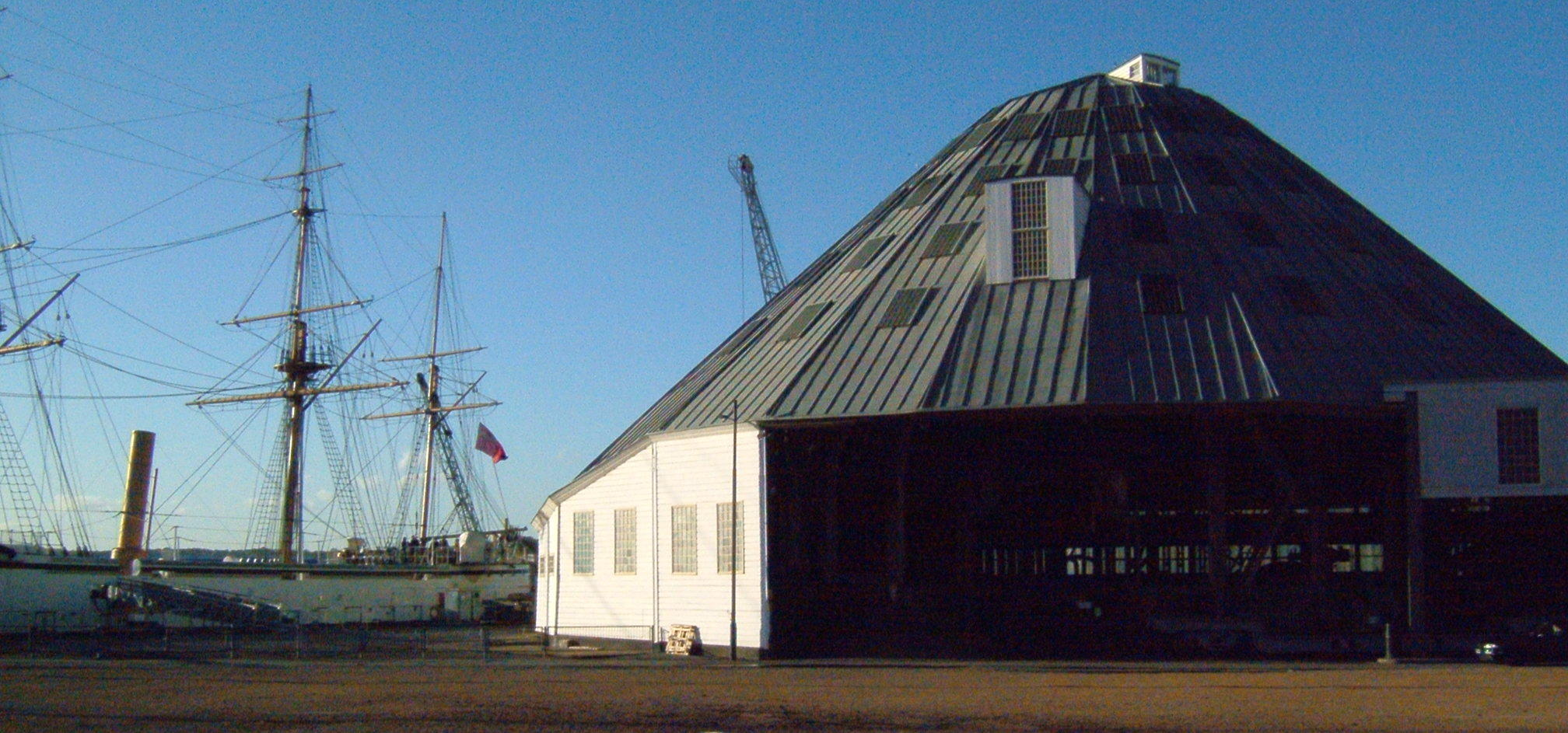
Royal Navy Dockyard, Chatham: No. 3 covered slip, 1838, a shed to keep the timbers of the ship under construction dry.
HMS Gannet is on left.

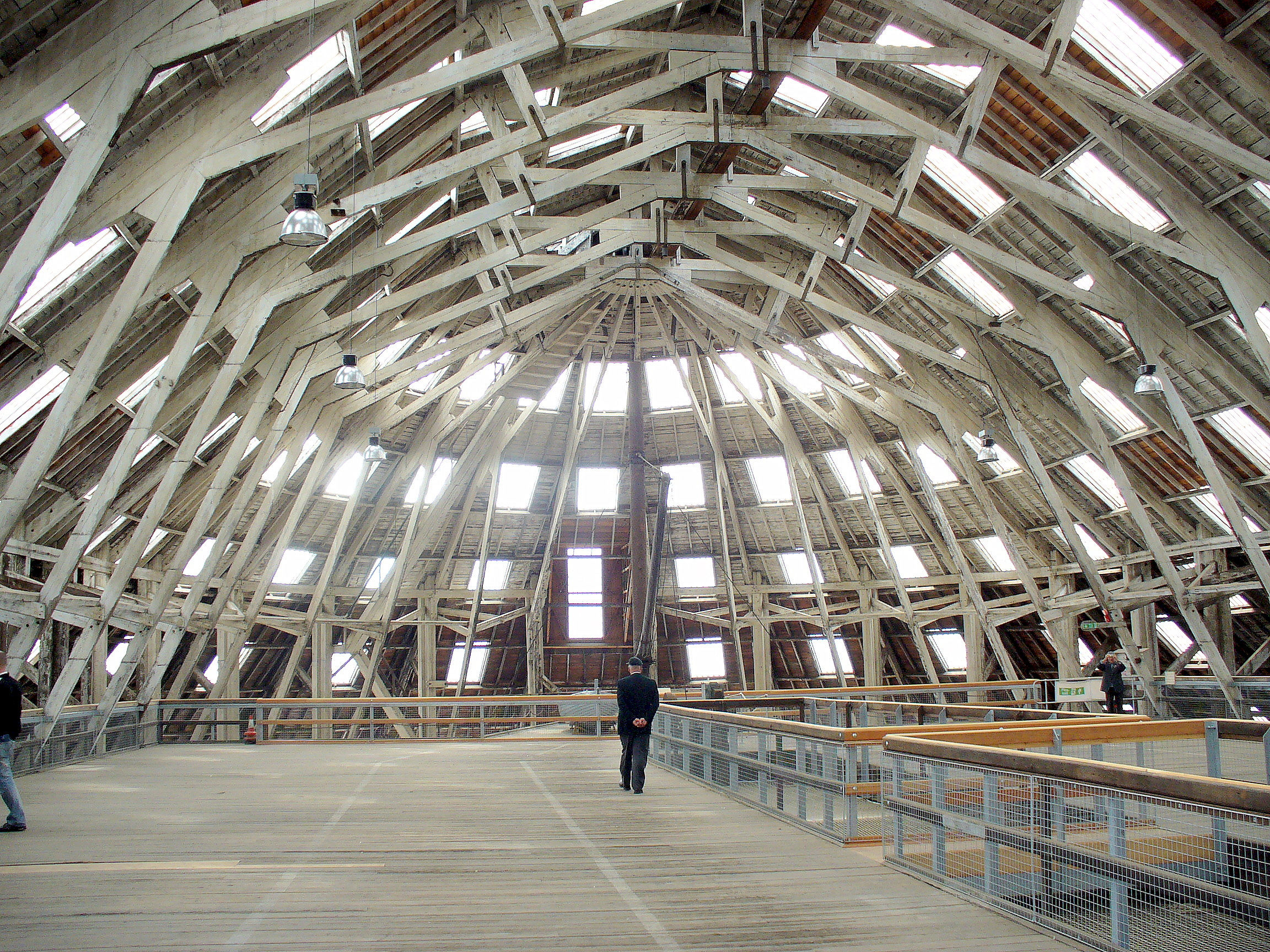
Interior of No. 3 covered slip, showing wooden trusses and ample light. The slipway has been backfilled to serve as a store-room.

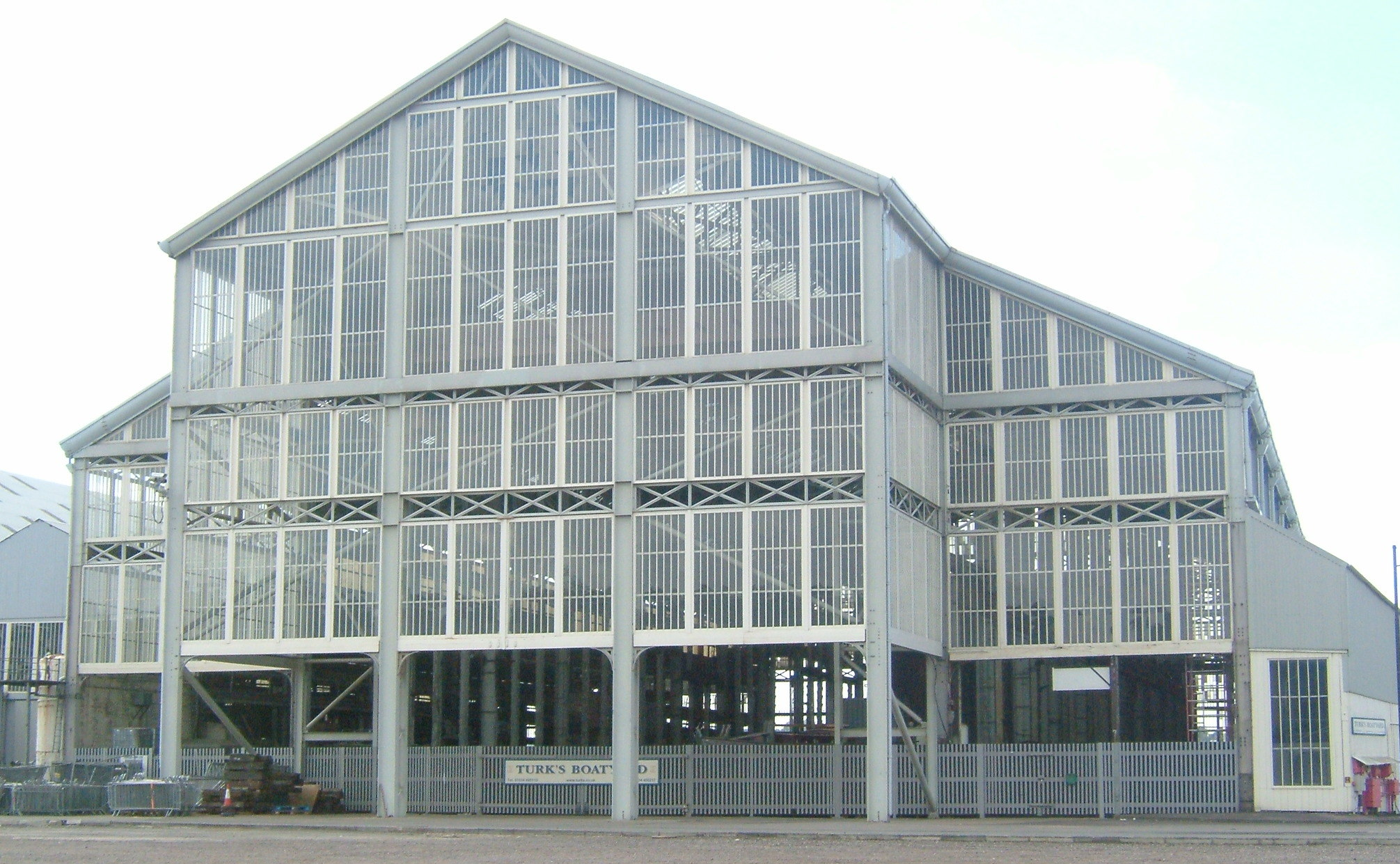
No. 7 covered slip, an early metal truss roof, 1852

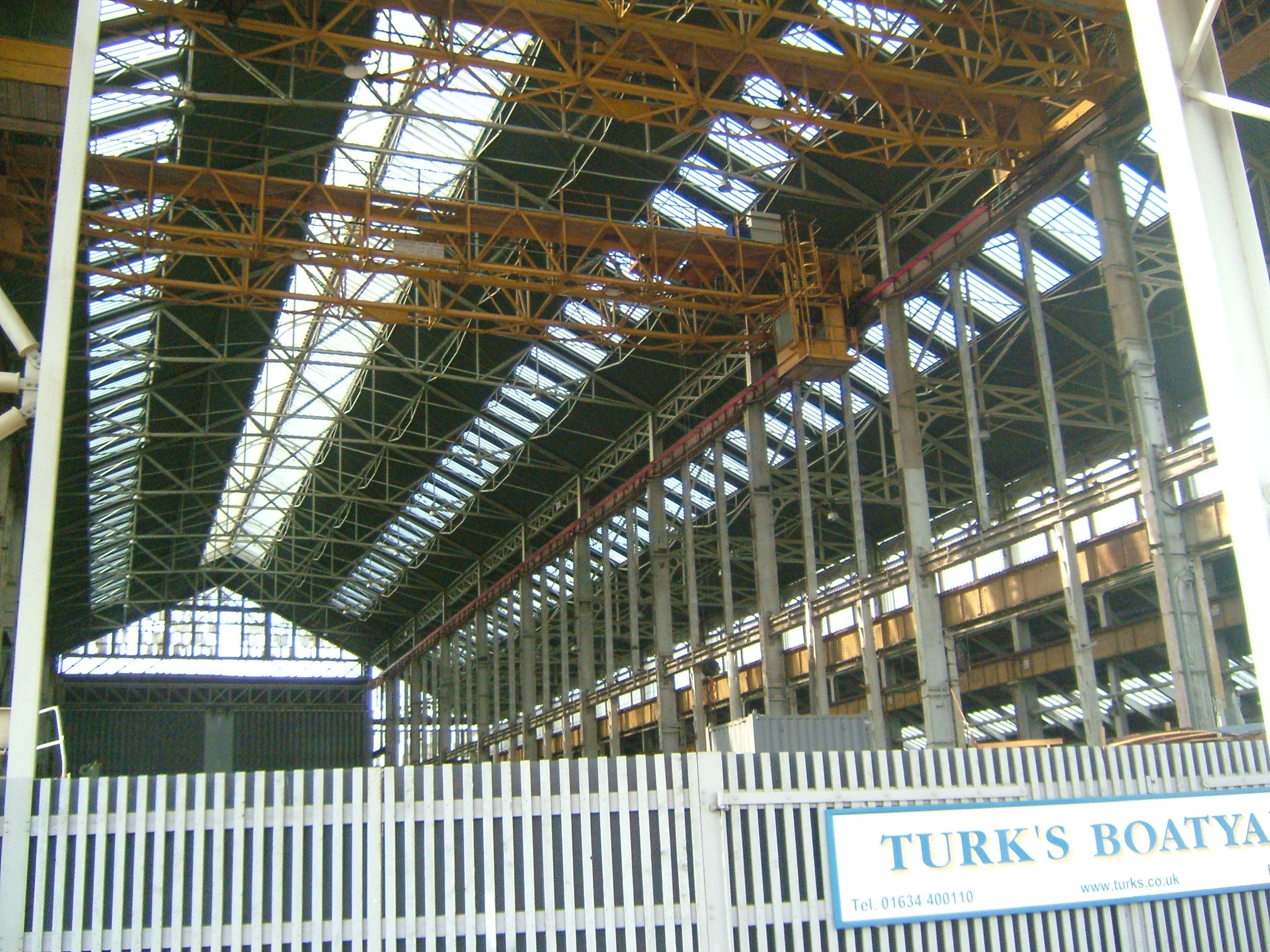
Interior of No. 7 covered slip

=== Functional design ===
Some industries had easily-recognised architectural elements, shaped by the functions they performed, such as the glass cones of glassworks, the bottle ovens such as those of the Staffordshire Potteries or the Royal Worcester porcelain works, the tapering roofs of the oast houses that dried the hops from Kent's hop orchards, and the pagoda-like ventilators of Scotch whisky distilleries.

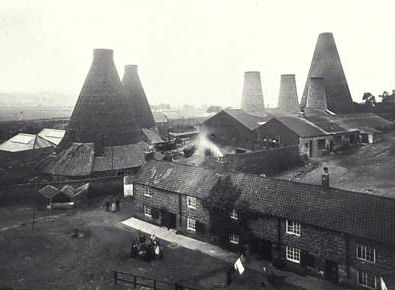
The distinctive glass cones of Lemington Glass Works, Newcastle upon Tyne, c. 1900

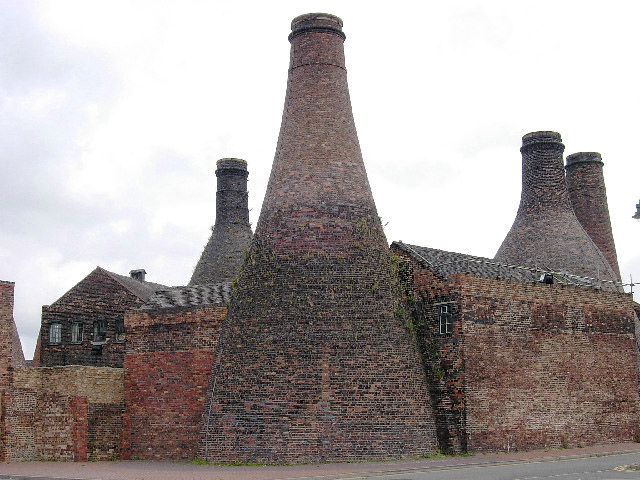
Bottle kiln for firing ceramics at Gladstone Pottery Museum, Stoke-on-Trent. Early 19th century.

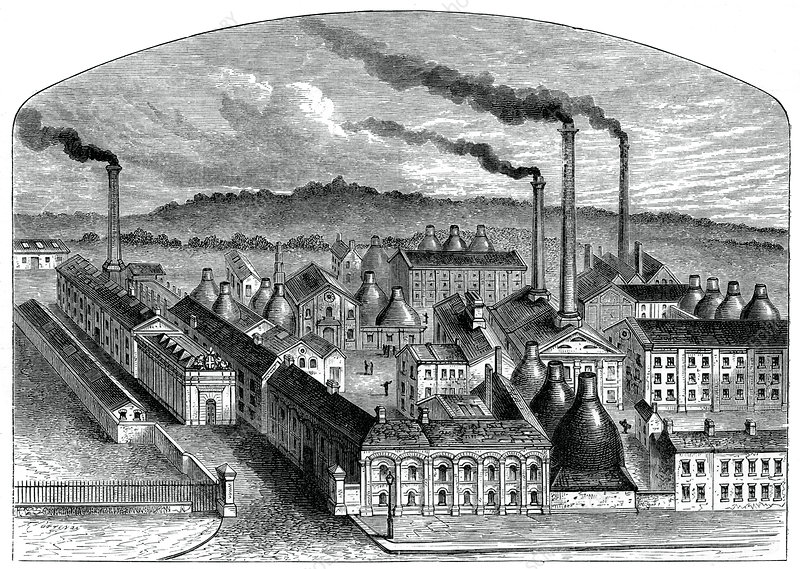
Engraving of The Royal Worcester porcelain works beside the Worcester and Birmingham Canal, c. 1880

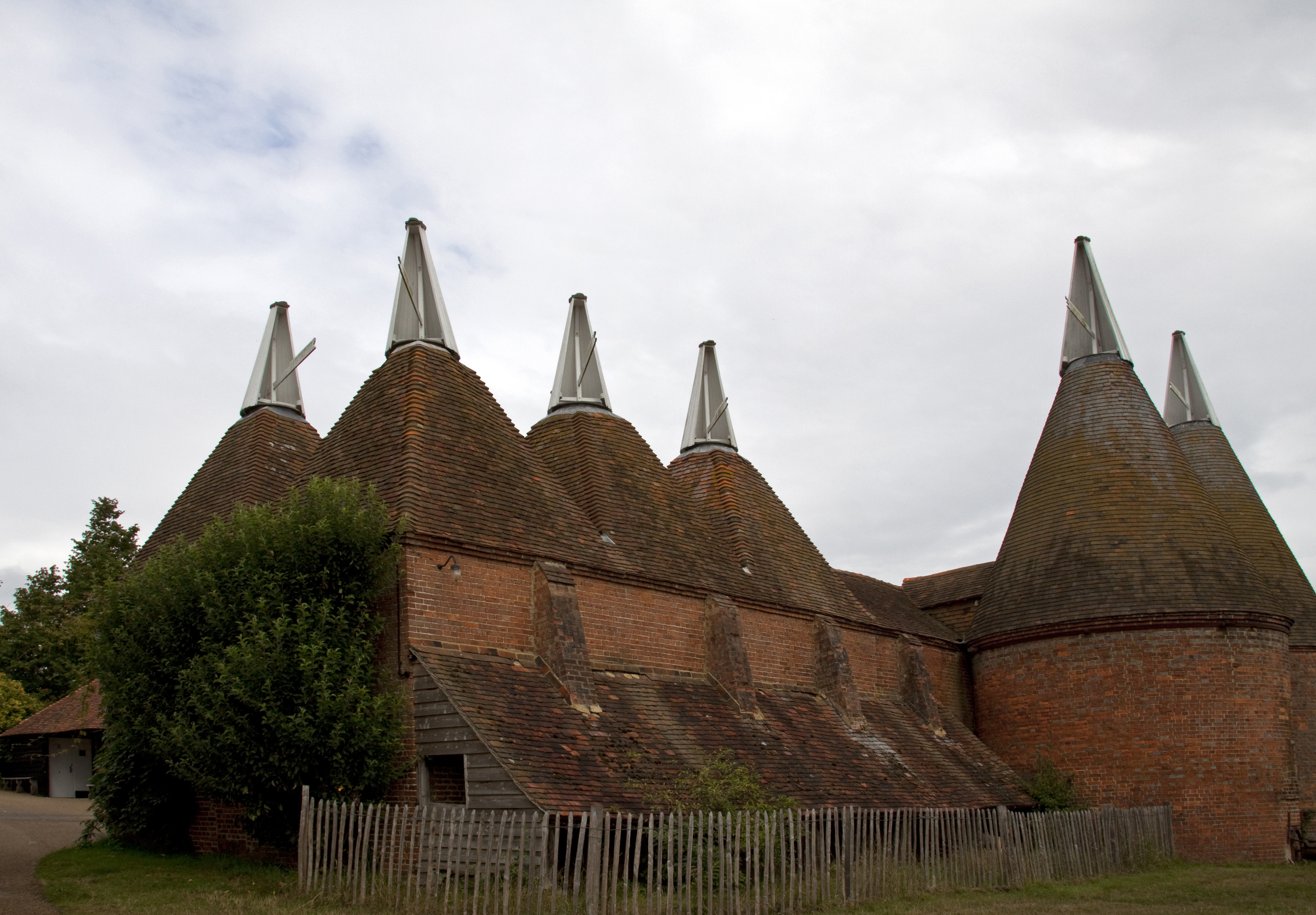
Oast houses at Sissinghurst Castle, Kent, used for drying hops for beer. The two on the right are of the usual conical type. Early 19th century.

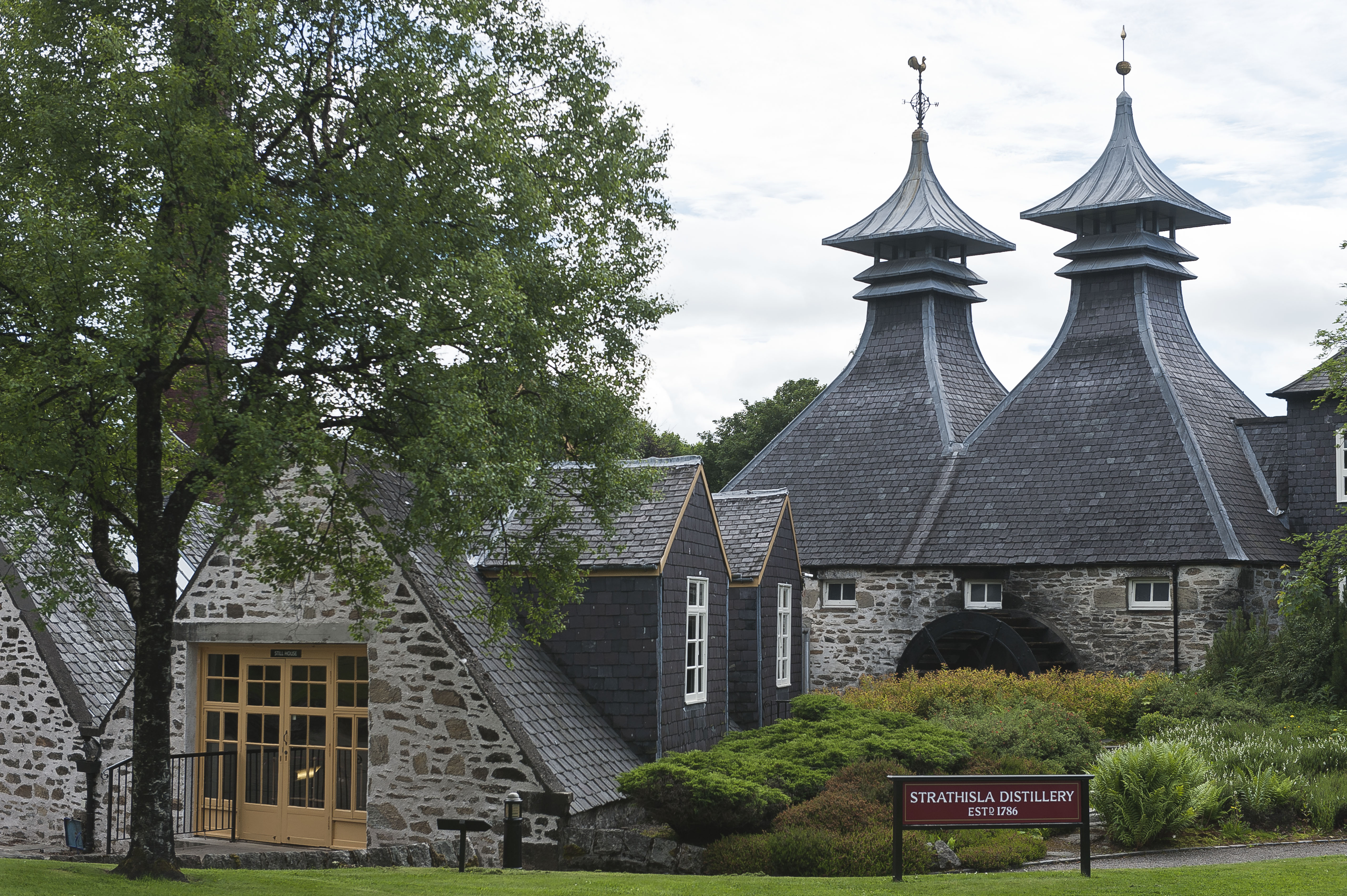
Strathisla distillery, Moray, founded 1786, with 'pagoda' ventilators c. 1872

== Workshop of the world ==
In the mid-19th century, Britain became in Benjamin Disraeli's 1838 phrase the "workshop of the world". Production in many industries grew rapidly, assisted by the development of an efficient distribution system in the new railway network. This allowed industries to concentrate production at a distance from sources of raw materials, especially coal. It powered steam engines for mills of all types, for example freeing the cotton mills from having to be beside a fast-flowing river, and enabling iron foundries, and blast furnaces to increase greatly in size.

=== Designed to impress ===
The wealth generated by the new industries enabled mill-owners to build to impress. The cotton magnate Eccles Shorrock commissioned Ernest Bates to create a showy design for his India Mill at Darwen, Lancashire, complete with a 300 feet (91 m) tall Italianate campanile-style chimney. This was built in red, white, and black brick, topped with cornices of stone, an ornamental urn at each corner, and an ornate cresting consisting of over 300 pieces of cast iron.

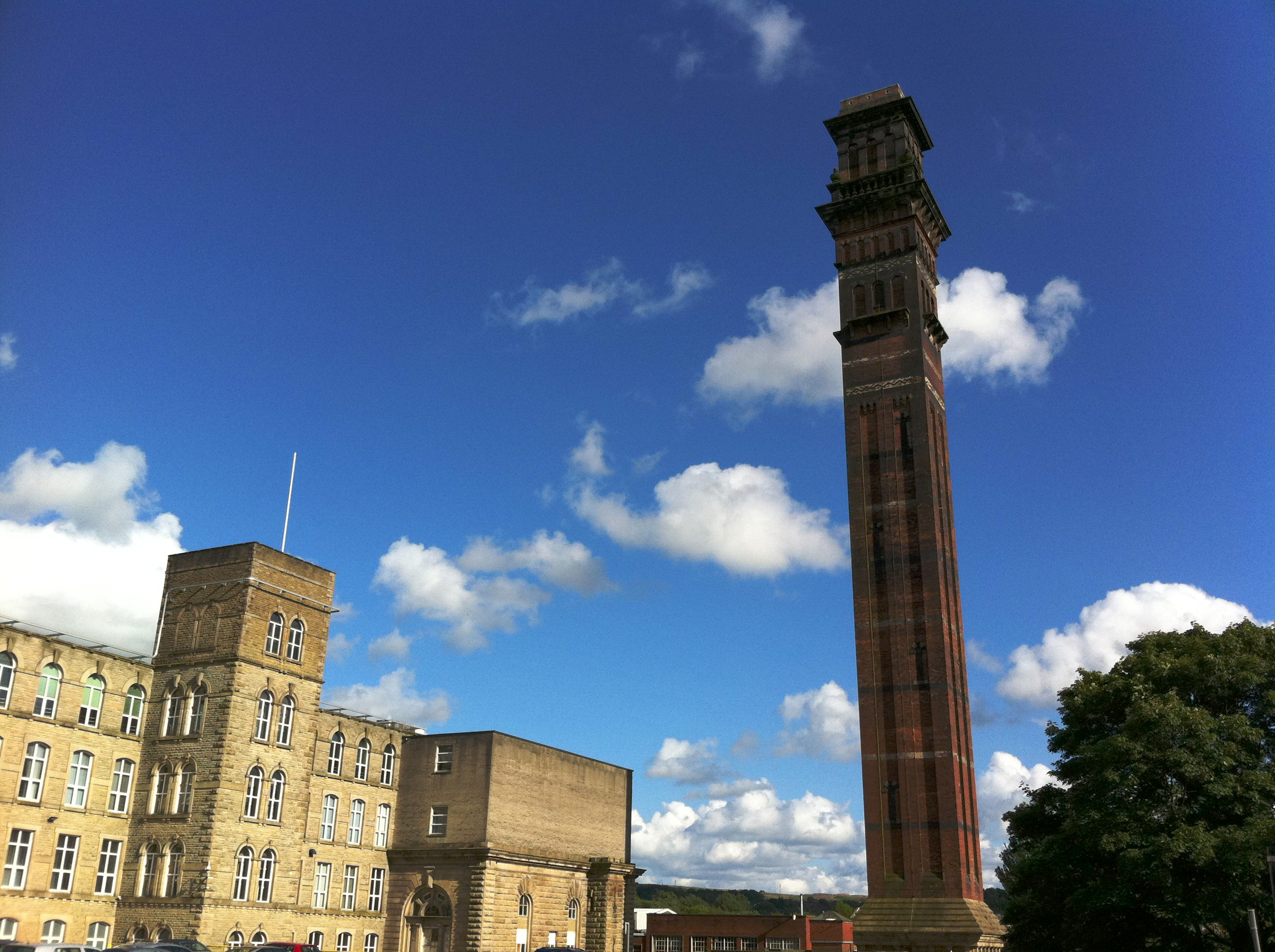
Eccles Shorrock's India Mill, Darwen and its 300 feet (91 m) high Italianate campanile chimney, 1867

=== Cathedrals of progress ===
Britain's railways, the first in the world, transformed both ordinary life and industry with unprecedentedly rapid transport. The railways showed off their importance with architecture that both referred to the past and celebrated the future. The French poet Théophile Gautier described the new railway stations as "cathedrals of the new humanity". (Note: Gautier stated: "Ces cathédrales de l'humanité nouvelle sont les points de rencontre des nations, le centre où tout converge, le noyau de gigantesques étoiles aux rayons de fer s’étirant jusqu'au bout de la terre" (These cathedrals of new humanity are the meeting points of nations, the centre where everything converges, the nucleus of gigantic stars with iron rays stretching to the ends of the earth). The futurist Filippo Tommaso Marinetti called them "cathédrales de notre temps" (cathedrals of our time). Also note Brunel's "cathedral to the iron horse".) Newcastle railway station, despite its curved platforms, was given a fully-covered roof in 1850, the earliest surviving one on the country. Bristol Temple Meads railway station has a cathedral-like exterior with Gothic arches and a pinnacled tower, while the 1841 old station there had a hammerbeam roof, said to have been modelled on Westminster Hall's timbers. The Great Western Railway's engineer, Isambard Kingdom Brunel, indeed described the station as "a cathedral to the iron horse". Paddington railway station was designed by Brunel, inspired by Joseph Paxton's Crystal Palace and the München Hauptbahnhof.

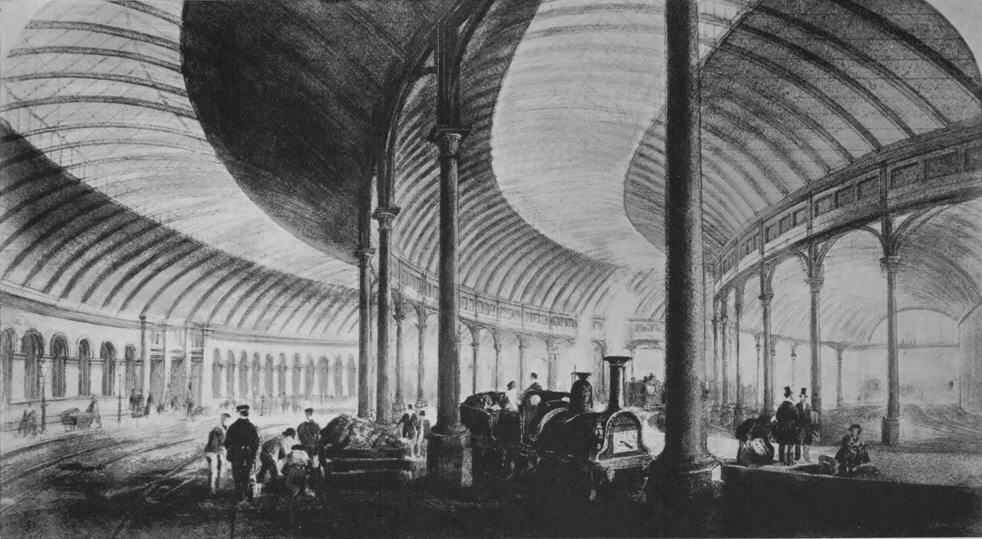
Engraving of the opening of Newcastle railway station, 1850

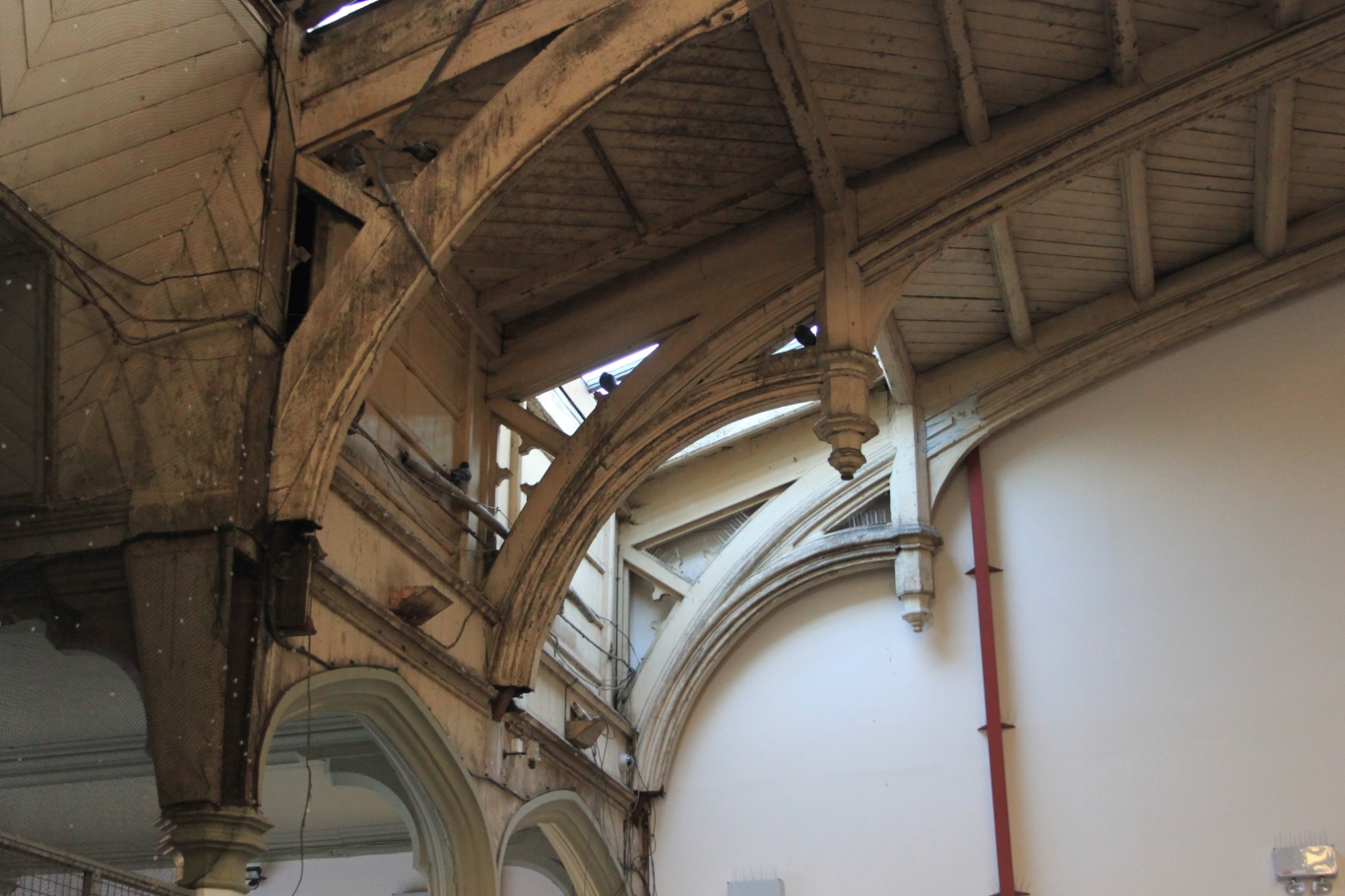
Isambard Kingdom Brunel's Great Western Railway built a hammerbeam roof for Bristol Old Station, 1841

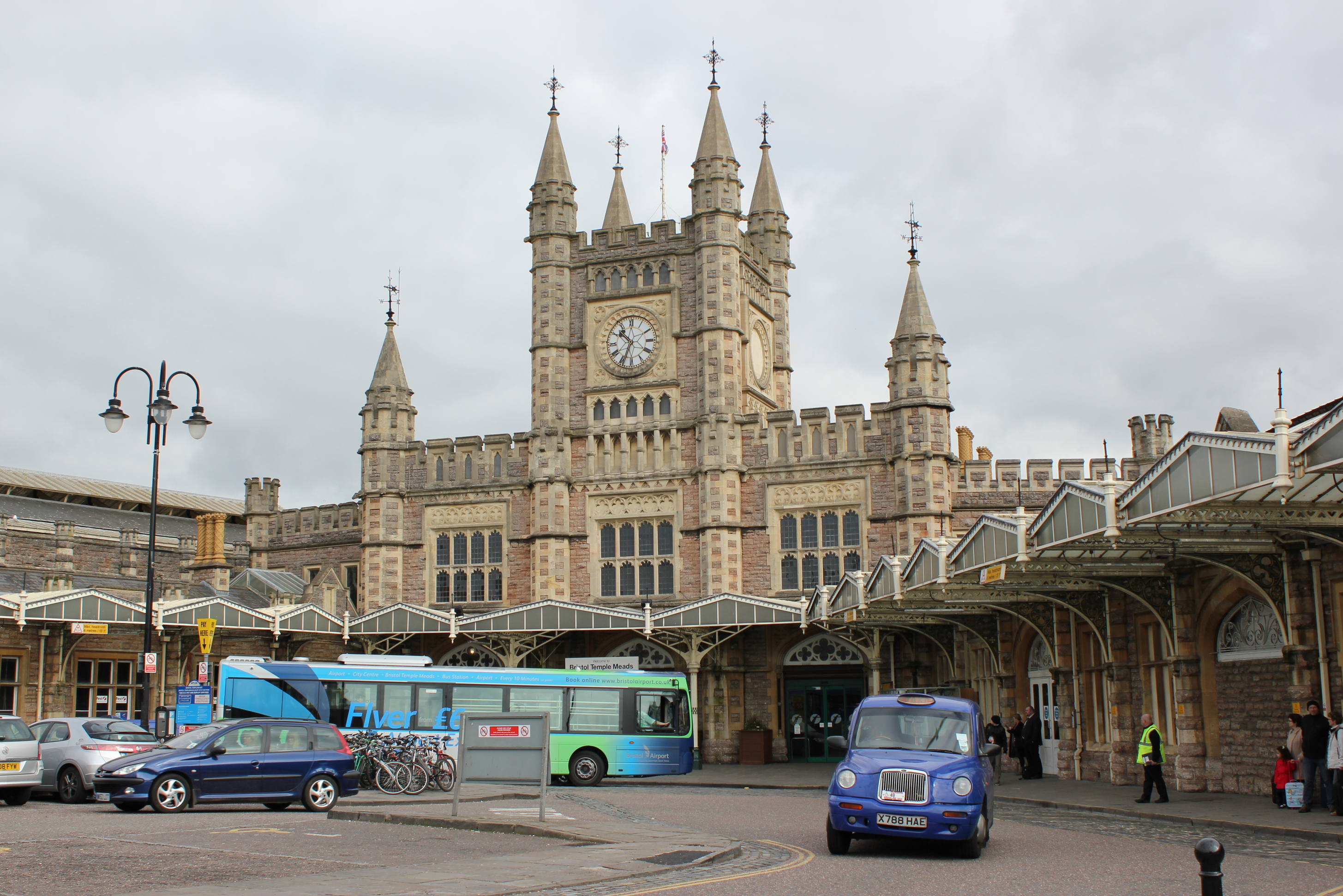
Bristol Temple Meads's cathedral-like main entrance, 1870s

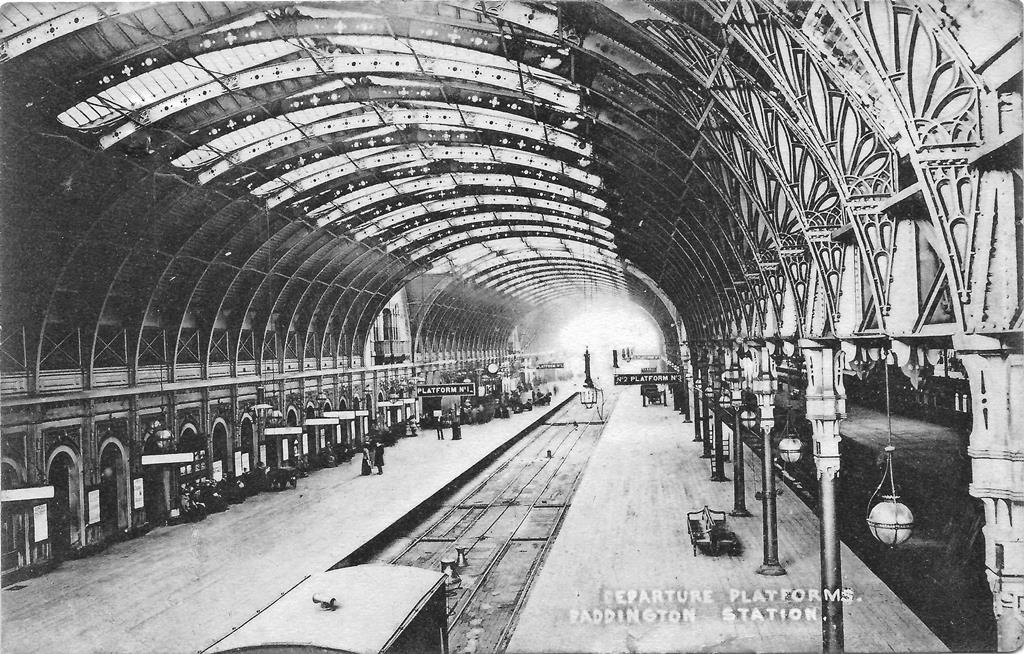
Paddington station, built 1854, seen in 1904

=== Experimenting with styles ===
Industrial architects experimented freely with non-industrial styles. One of the earliest was Egyptian Revival, a style that arose in response to Napoleon's conquest of Egypt, accompanied by a scientific expedition. Joseph Bonomi designed the Temple Works flax mill offices, in Holbeck, Leeds, modelled on the Mammisi of the Dendera Temple complex, in 1836–1840.

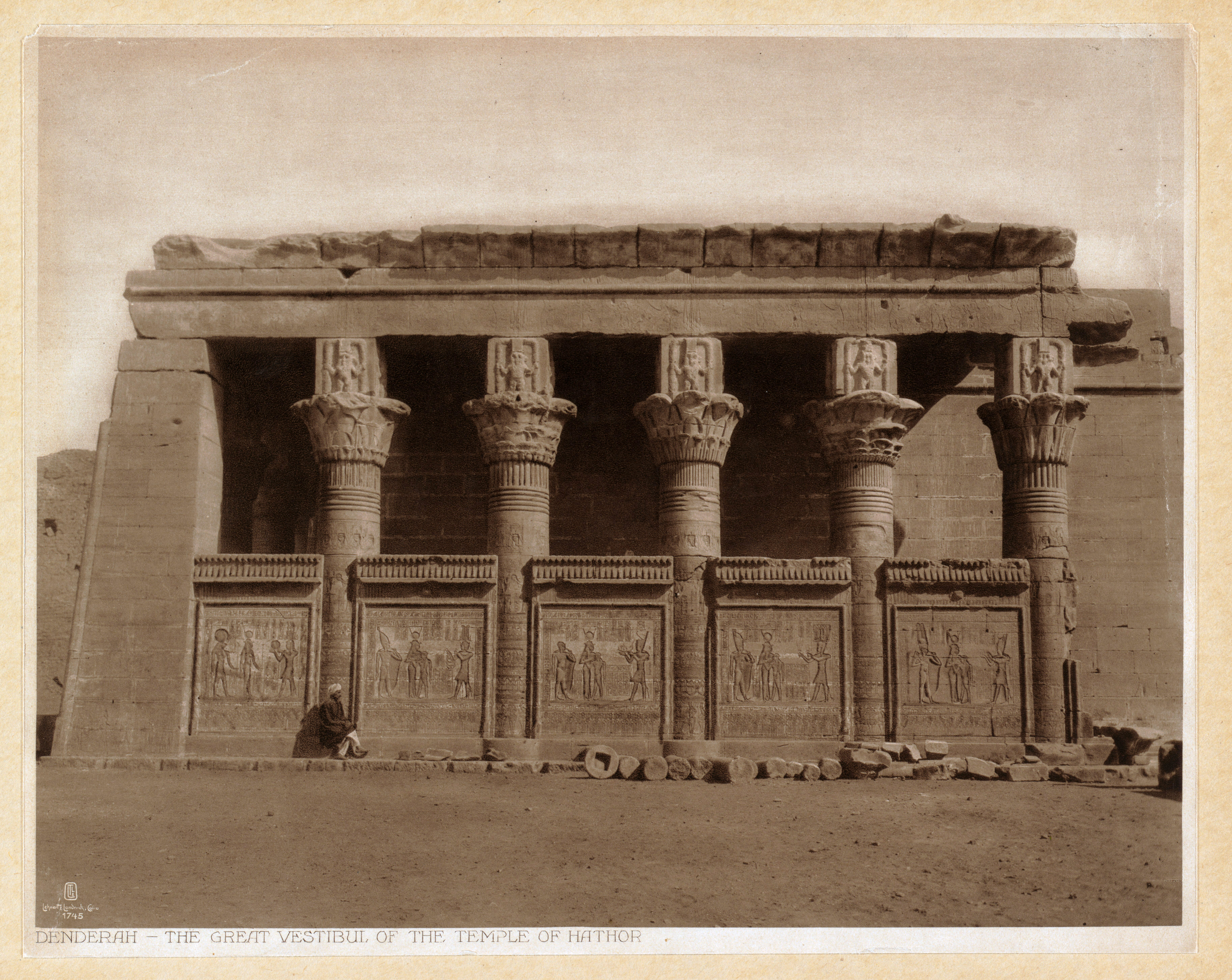
The Roman Mammisi at the Dendera Temple complex, Egypt

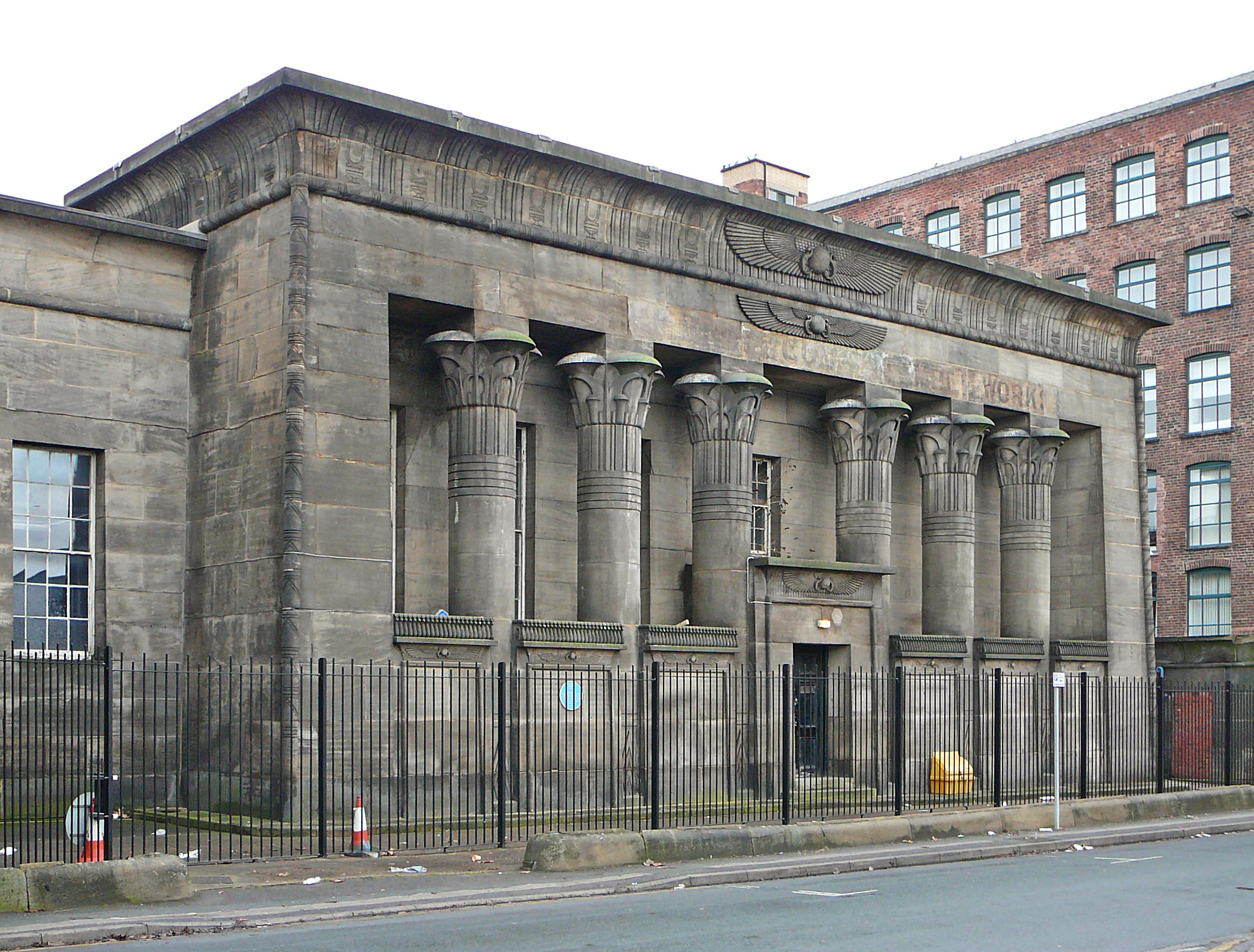
Temple Works flax mill offices, Holbeck, Leeds, designed by Joseph Bonomi in Egyptian Revival style, 1836–1840

At Stoke Newington, the Metropolitan Water Board's engine house was constructed to look something like a medieval castle, complete with towers and crenellation. The pumping station at Ryhope, Sunderland, was built in 1869, more or less Jacobean in style with curving Dutch gables, and an octagonal brick chimney. The architectural historian Hubert Pragnell calls it a "cathedral of pistons and brass set within a fine shell of Victorian brickwork with no expense spared".

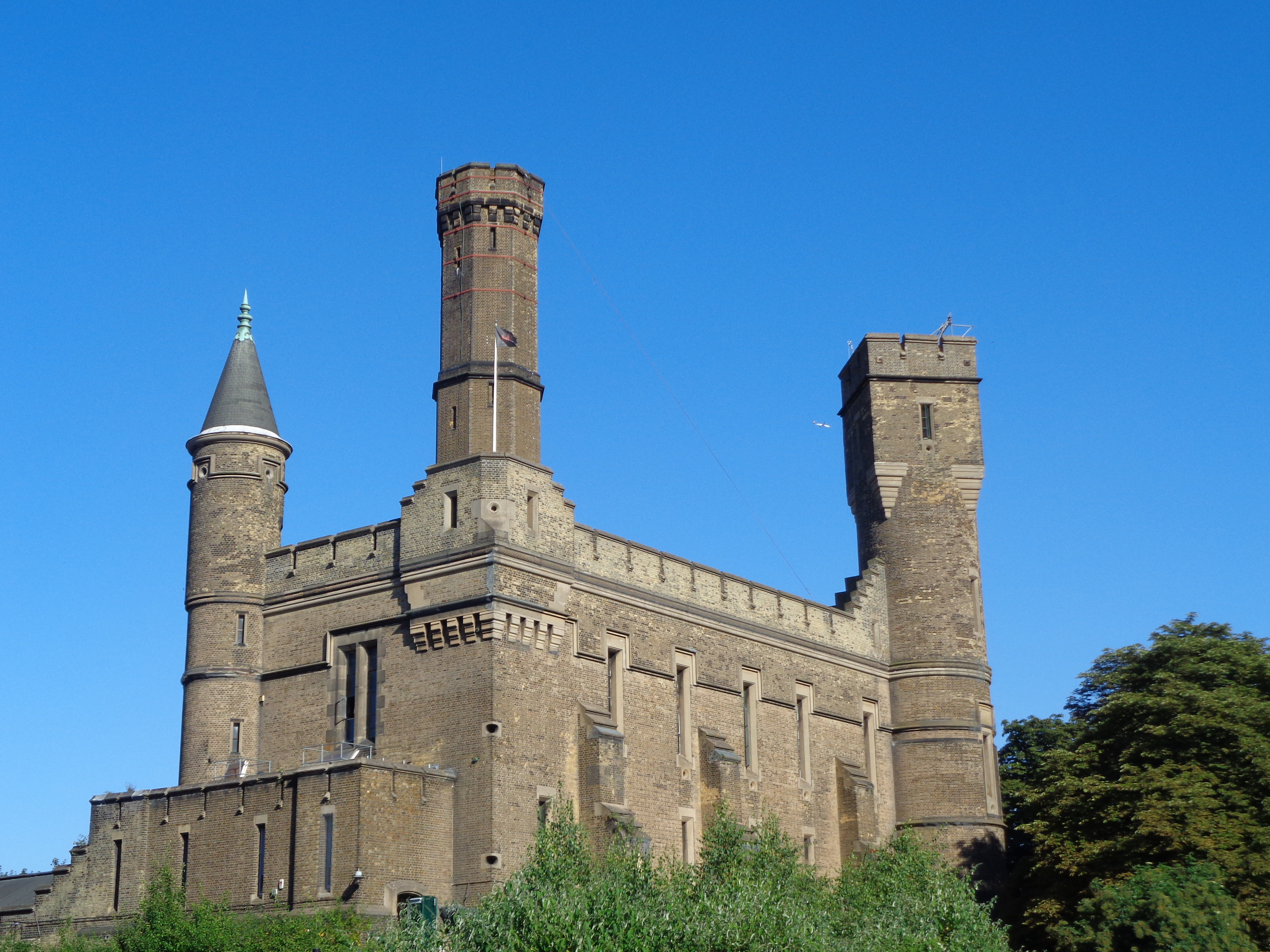
Medieval castle:
Engine House,
Stoke Newington, 1854–6

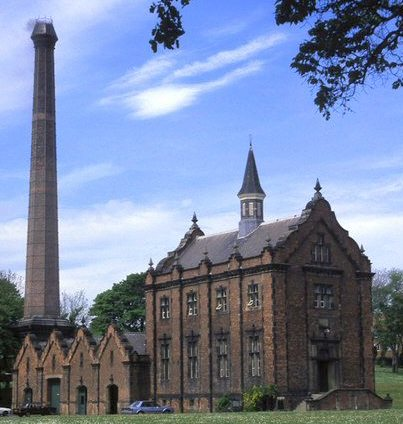
Jacobean, Dutch gables:
Ryhope pumping station,
Sunderland, 1869

The Bliss Tweed Mill at Chipping Norton was designed in 1872 by George Woodhouse, a Lancashire mill architect. It is constructed of local limestone, and despite its 5 storeys, is grandly modelled to resemble a Charles Barry type English country house, with the addition of the dominant chimney stack, "a sophisticated aesthetic solution to a functional requirement". The chimney and curved stairwell tower are offset from the centre of the building, while the corners are balustraded and topped with urns. The Templeton Carpet Factory in Glasgow has been called "the most remarkable display of polychromatic brickwork in Britain". It was built in 1892 by William Leiper for James Templeton and Son, for the weaving of Axminster carpets. It was modelled in Venetian Gothic on the Doge's Palace in Venice.

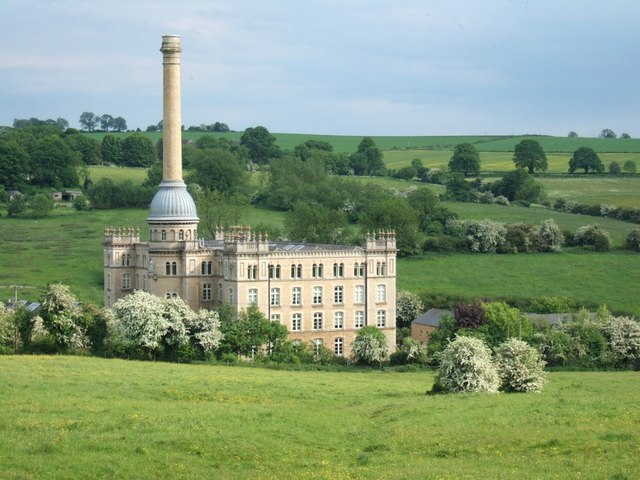
English country house:
Bliss Tweed Mill,
Chipping Norton, 1872

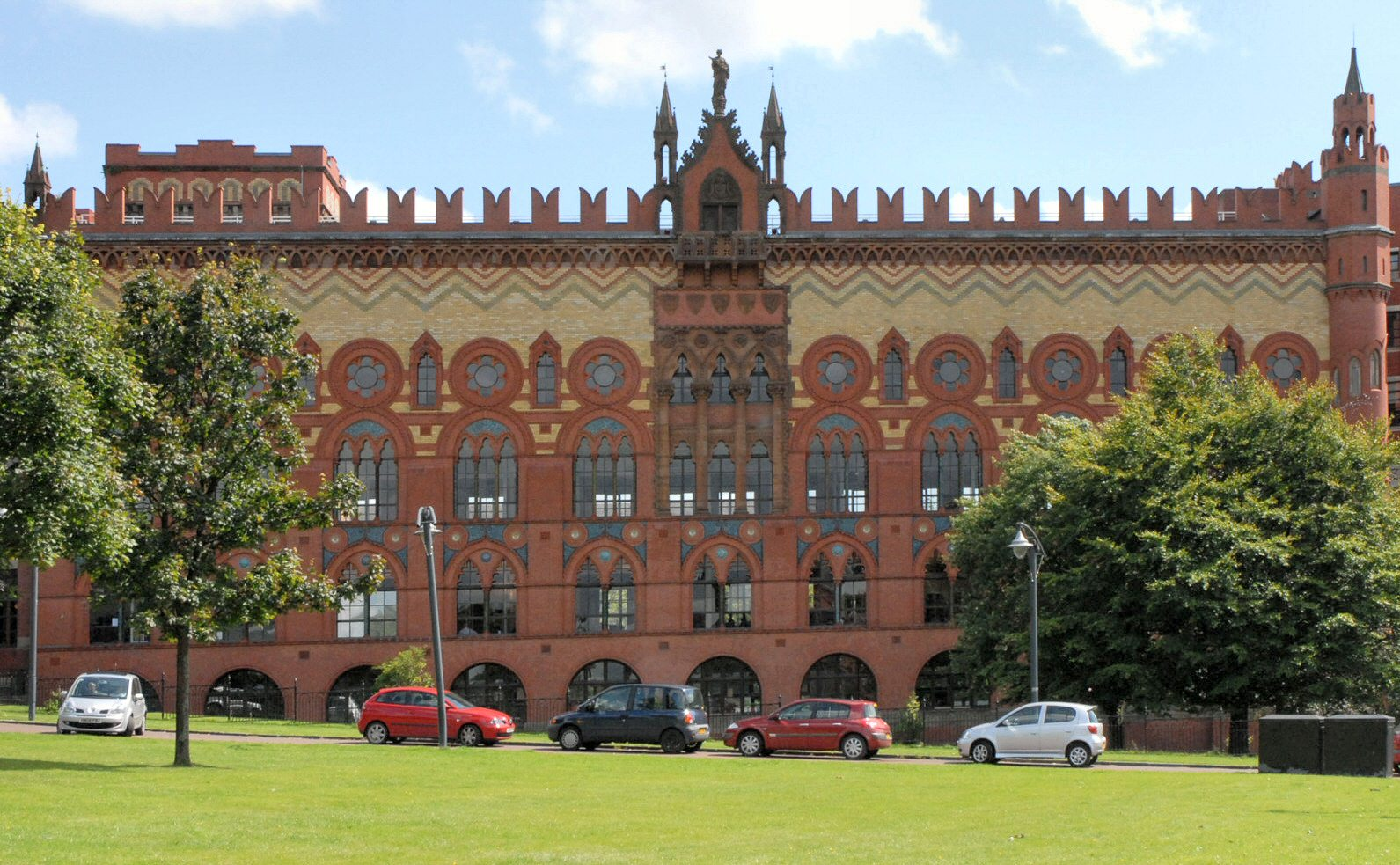
Venetian Gothic:
Templeton Carpet Factory,
Glasgow, 1892

=== Landmark structures ===
Some industrial structures have become landmarks in their own right. The Ribblehead Viaduct carries the Settle–Carlisle railway across the Ribble Valley in North Yorkshire. It was built by the Midland Railway to a design by John Sydney Crossley, opening in 1876. Faced with limestone and with almost semicircular red brick arches, it is 440 yards (400 m) long and 104 feet (32 m) high. It is now an admired Grade II*-listed structure. Gas for domestic heating, produced from coal, was stored in enormous cylindrical gasholders, their iron cage frames now surviving in some places around the country as memorials to long-vanished industry (such as the Bromley-by-Bow or Oval gasholders).

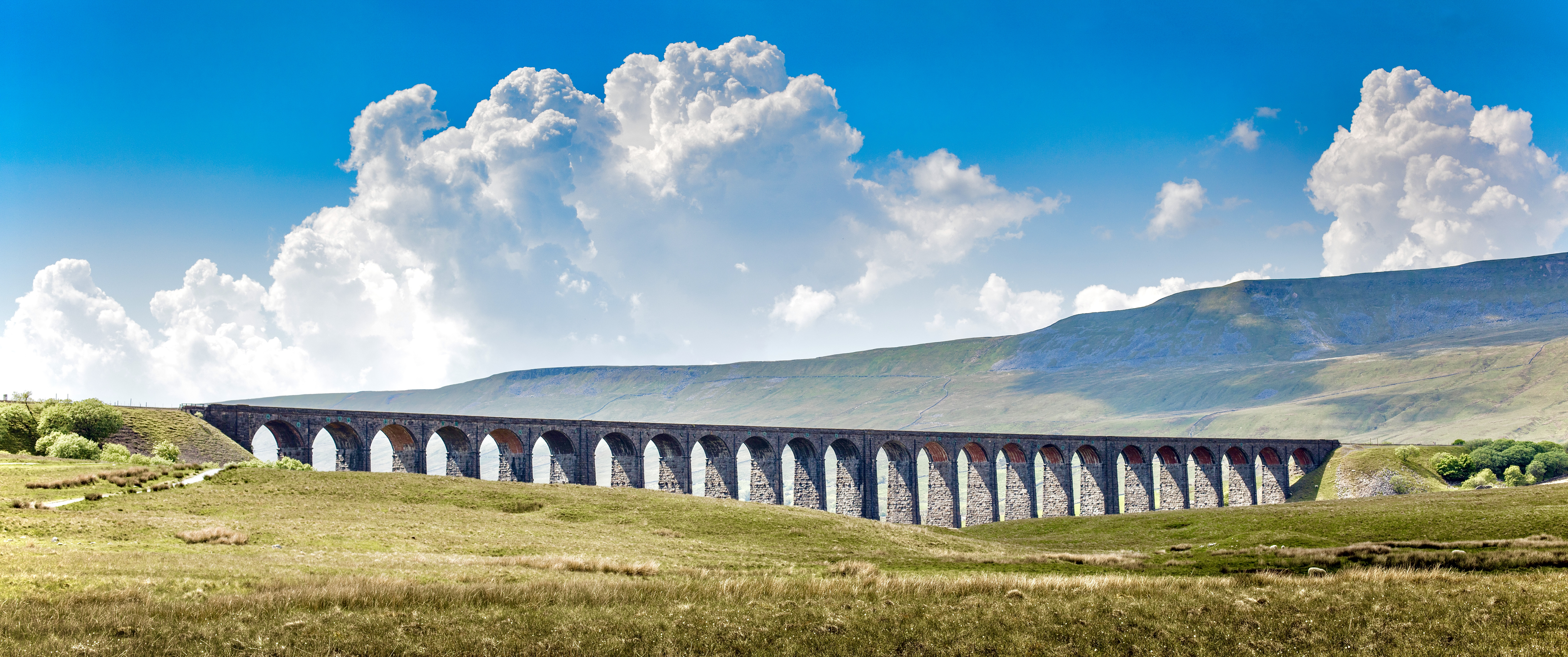
Ribblehead Viaduct, designed by John Sydney Crossley, 1876

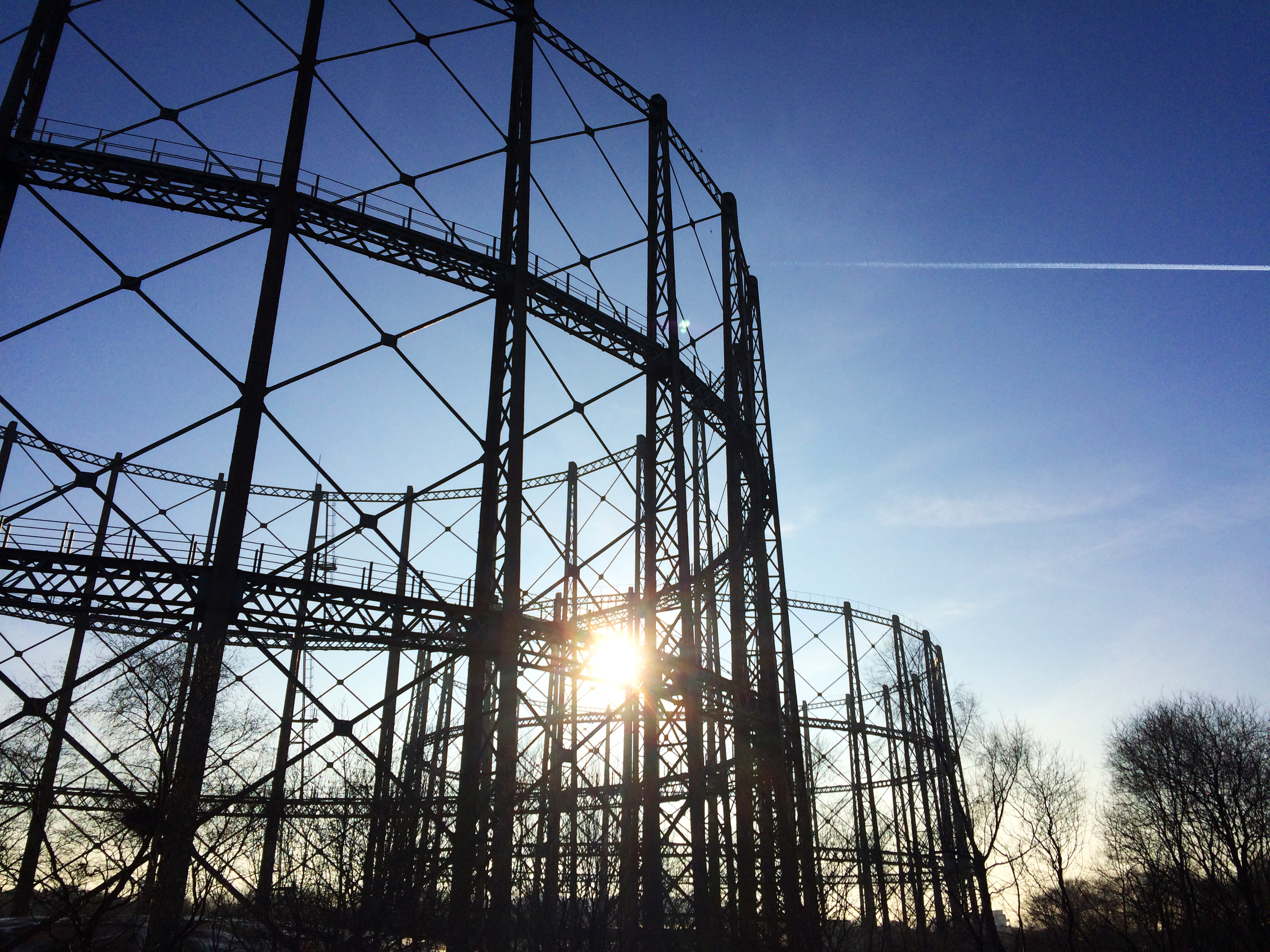
Nos. 4 and 5 Gasholders, Kelvindale, Glasgow, 1893

=== Moving towards the modern ===
The Power House, Chiswick is an electricity generating station, designed by William Curtis Green and J. Clifton Robinson in 1901 for the London United Electrical Tramway Company. It is described by the architectural historian Nikolaus Pevsner as a "monumental free Baroque brick and stone composition" from the "early, heroic era of generating stations" with enormous stone voussoirs. Above the entrance is a pair of large stone figures: one representing "Electricity", her foot on a globe, and her hand emitting lightning flashes by the rotor of a generator; the other representing "Locomotion", her foot on an electric tram and her hand on a winged wheel.

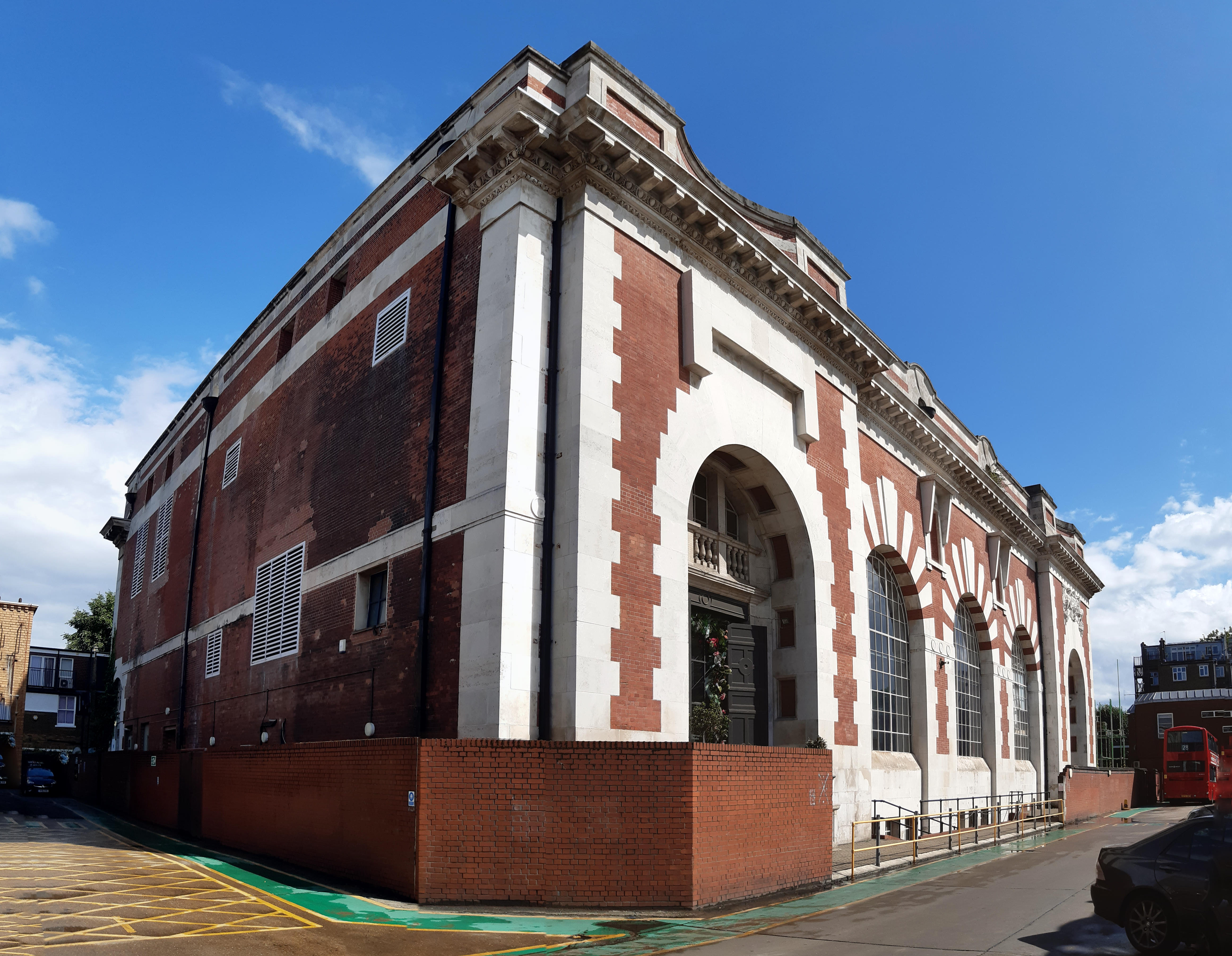
The Power House, Chiswick, 1901:
the "early, heroic era of generating stations"

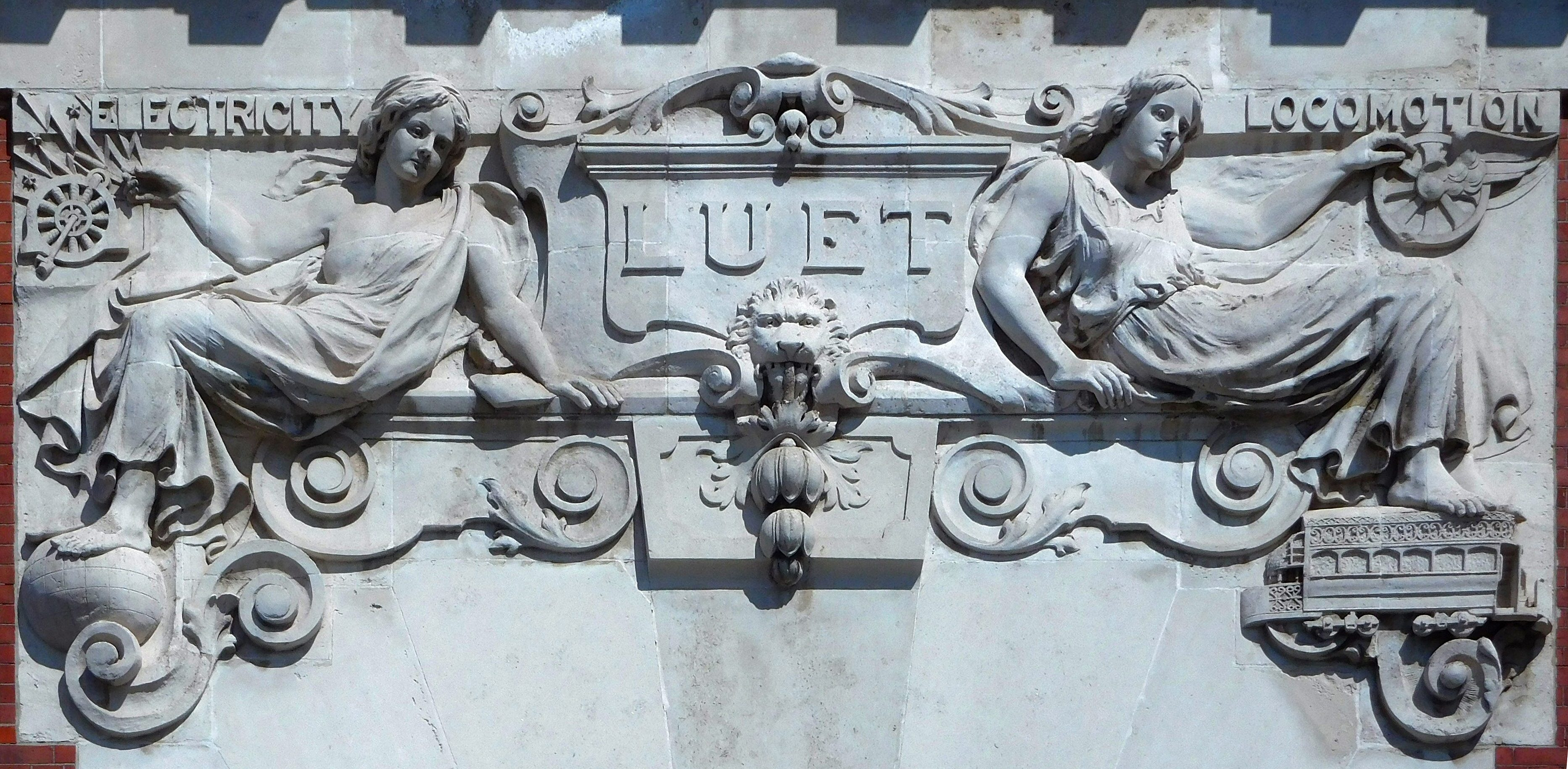
'Electricity' and 'Locomotion' above the London United Electrical Tramway Company's Power House doorway

Arthur Sanderson & Sons' Grade II* listed wallpaper printing works in Chiswick was designed by the modernist architect Charles Voysey in 1902, his only industrial building. It is faced in white glazed brick, with Staffordshire blue bricks forming horizontal bands; the plinth, door and window surrounds, and dressings are in Portland stone. It is considered an "important Arts and Crafts factory building". It faces Sandersons' more conventional 1893 red brick factory across a narrow street. Charles Holden's modernist station buildings for the London Underground freely combined cylinders with flat planes. An example is his "futuristic" 1933 Arnos Grove tube station, which has a brightly-lit circular ticket hall in brick with a flat concrete roof.

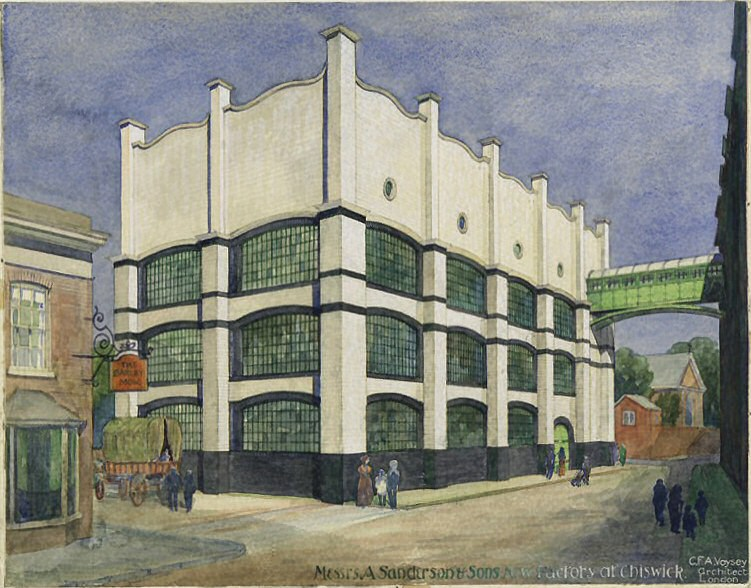
Modernist wallpaper printing works for Sandersons by Charles Voysey, Chiswick, 1902

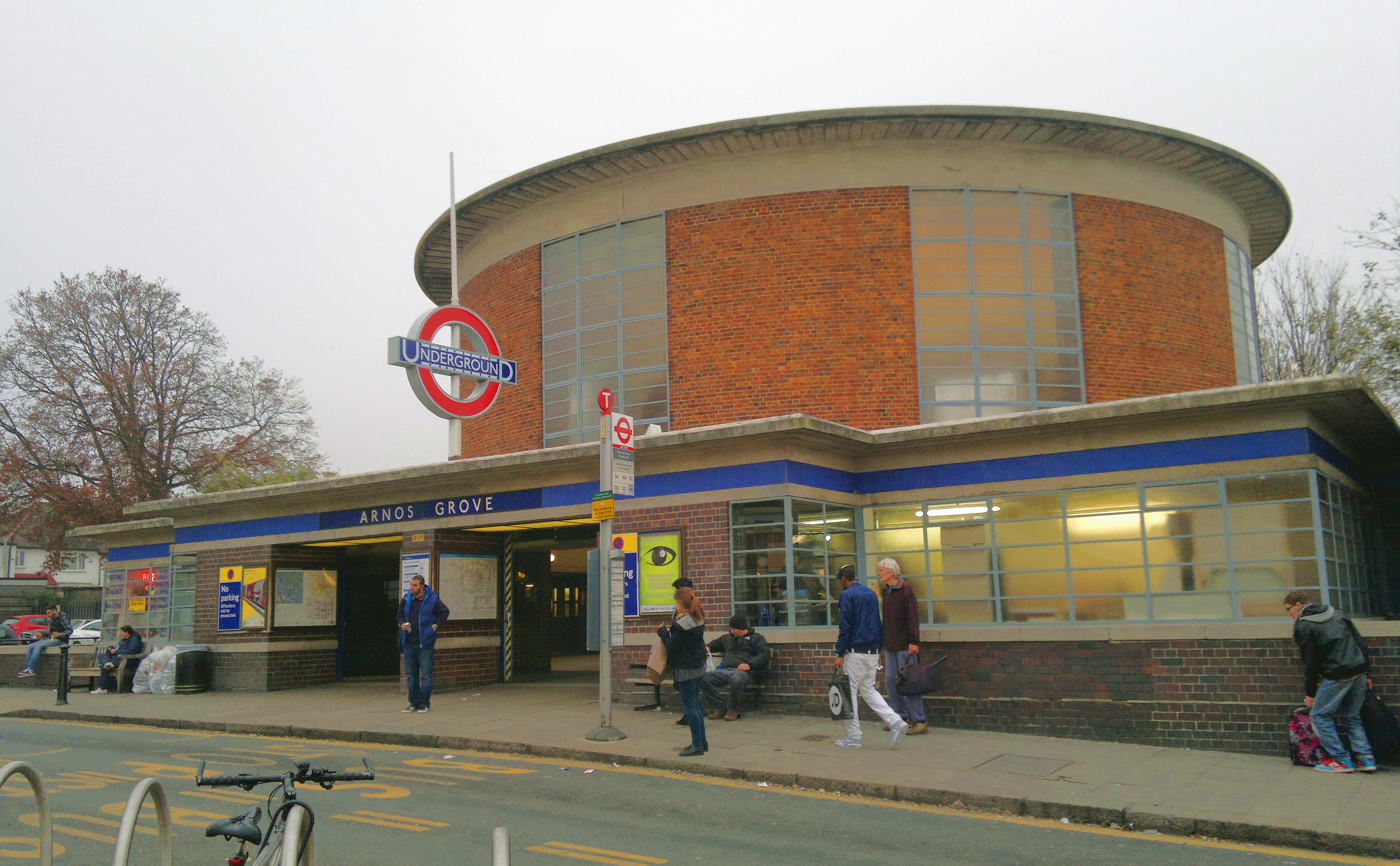
Charles Holden's "futuristic" Arnos Grove tube station, 1933

=== New types of construction ===
Alongside new styles of architecture came novel types of construction. William T. Walker's 1903–1904 Clément-Talbot car factory (Note: The office building is now the Sunbeam Studios; the name recalls the factory's 1938 takeover by Rootes, who renamed it Sunbeam-Talbot.) on Barlby Road, Ladbroke Grove, had a traditional-looking office entrance in William and Mary style, built of red brick with stone pilasters, cornice, the Talbot family crest, and Porte-cochère. The impressive frontage gave access to a vaulted marble-floored entrance hall that was used as a car showroom, while the main factory building behind it was an early reinforced concrete structure. The availability of new materials such as steel and concrete in industrial quantities enabled radically new designs, such as the Tees Transporter Bridge. It has concrete foundations, poured in shafts dug using caissons, down to bedrock far below the high tide mark; the bridge structure is of steel, with granite piers.

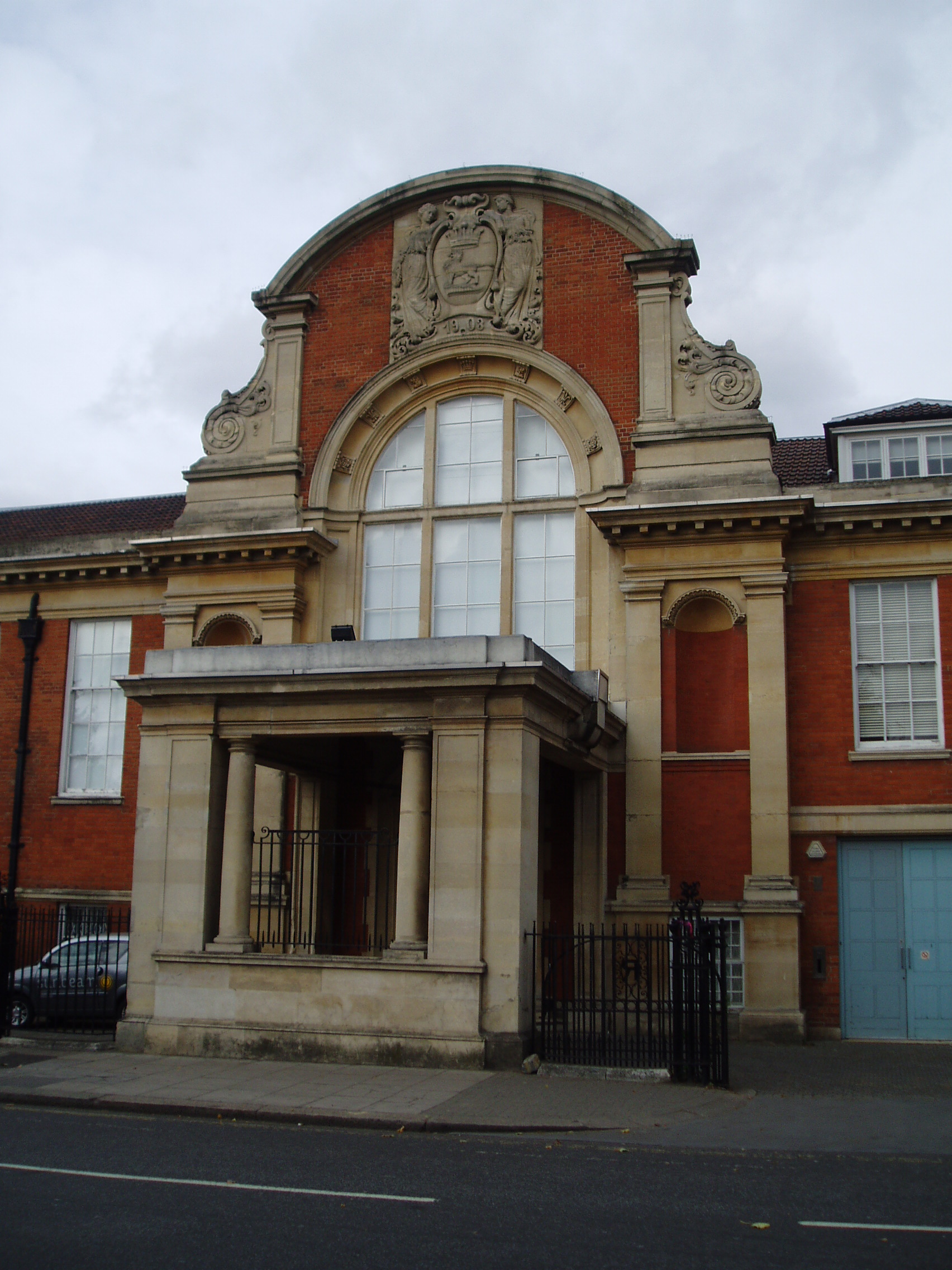
Clément-Talbot car factory by William T. Walker, Ladbroke Grove, 1903–1904

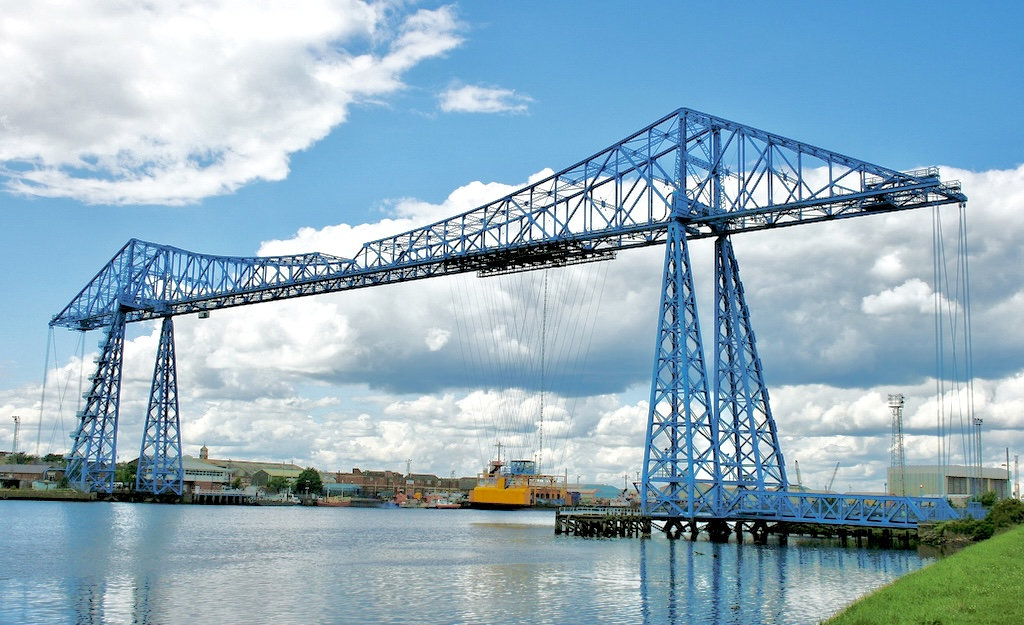
Tees Transporter Bridge, designed by Cleveland Bridge & Engineering Company and built by Sir William Arrol & Co., 1911

== Between the wars, 1914 to 1945 ==
=== "By-pass modern" ===
The "daylight factory" concept, with long sleek buildings and attractive grassed surroundings, was brought in from America, starting in Trafford Park. They often had large windows and were placed along major roads such as the Great West Road in Brentford, West London, earning them the name of "by-pass modern" factories. A well-known exemplar is Wallis, Gilbert and Partners' 1932–1935 Hoover Building in the Art Deco style; it was at the time derided for "its overtly commercial character", but is now Grade II-listed. The architectural historian Hubert Pragnell describes it as "the cathedral of modernism" and "an icon of 1930s design".

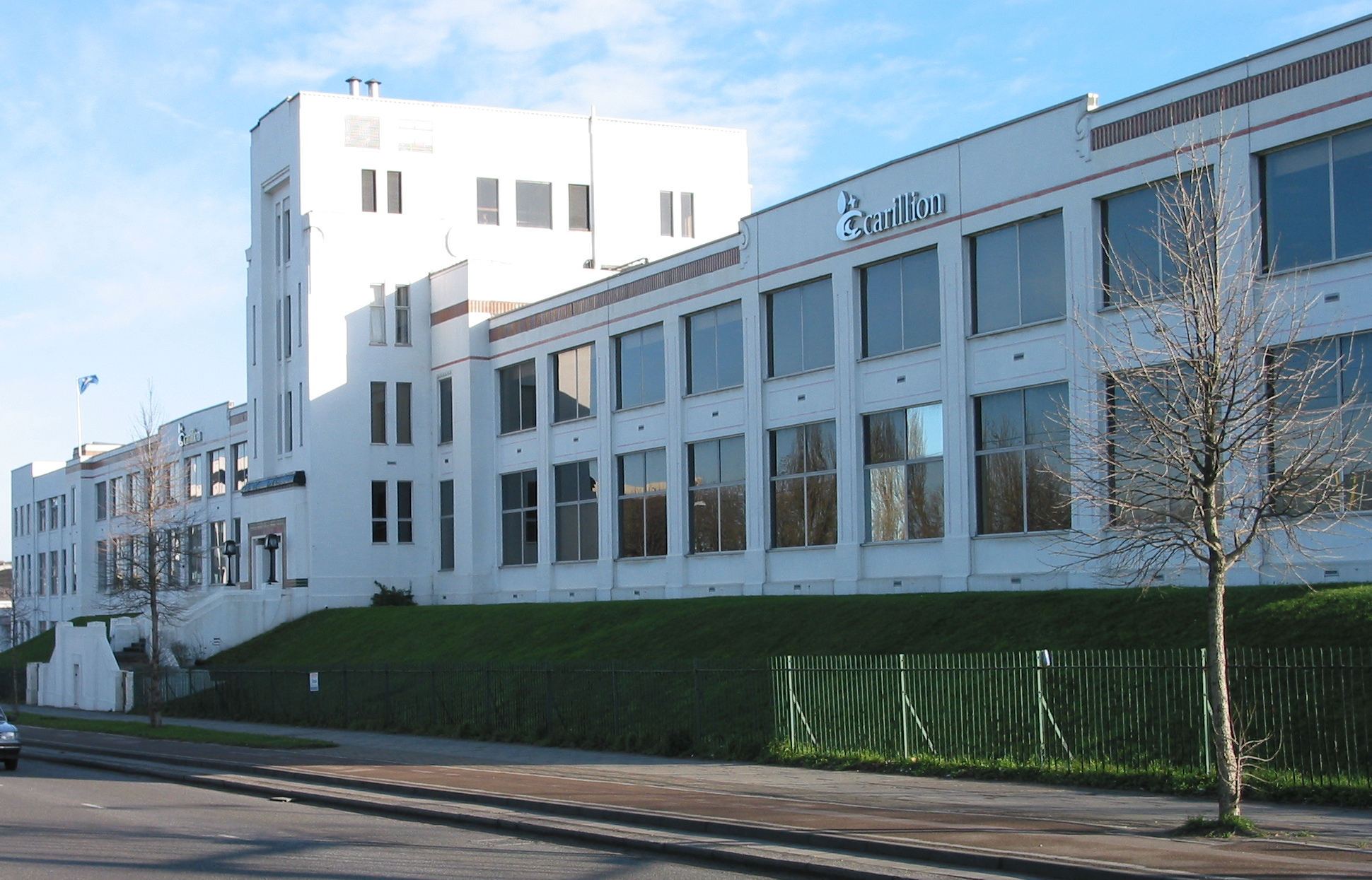
The Pyrene Building, Great West Road, Brentford, 1929–30

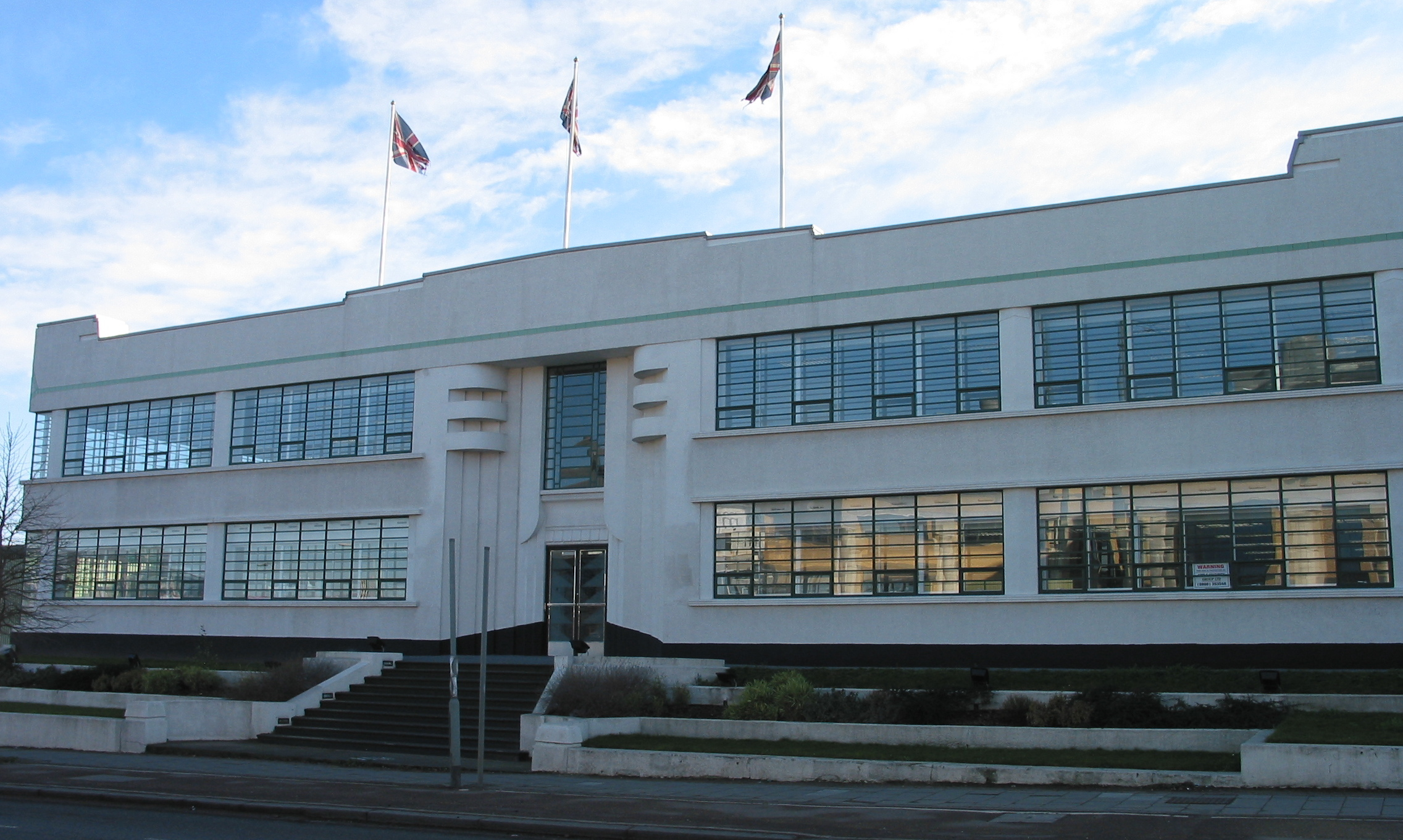
Coty Cosmetics Factory, Great West Road, Brentford, 1932

=== Art Deco Egyptian ===
A distinctively different inter-war building is the Carreras Cigarette Factory, built 1926–1928 on an inner-city site in Mornington Crescent, Camden. It was designed by the architects M. E. Collins, O. H. Collins, and A. G. Porri in a combination of Art Deco and Egyptian Revival styles. The factory has a frontage of 550 feet (170 m) under a continuous cornice with flute lines painted red and blue. Its construction is modern, a pioneer of pre-stressed concrete, but it is decorated to recall the glories of ancient Egypt, after the discovery of Tutankhamun's tomb in 1922. The company chose a black cat based on the Egyptian cat god Bastet to symbolise its brand, and placed a pair of large cat effigies beside the entrance stairs, as well as smaller cat roundels on the building.

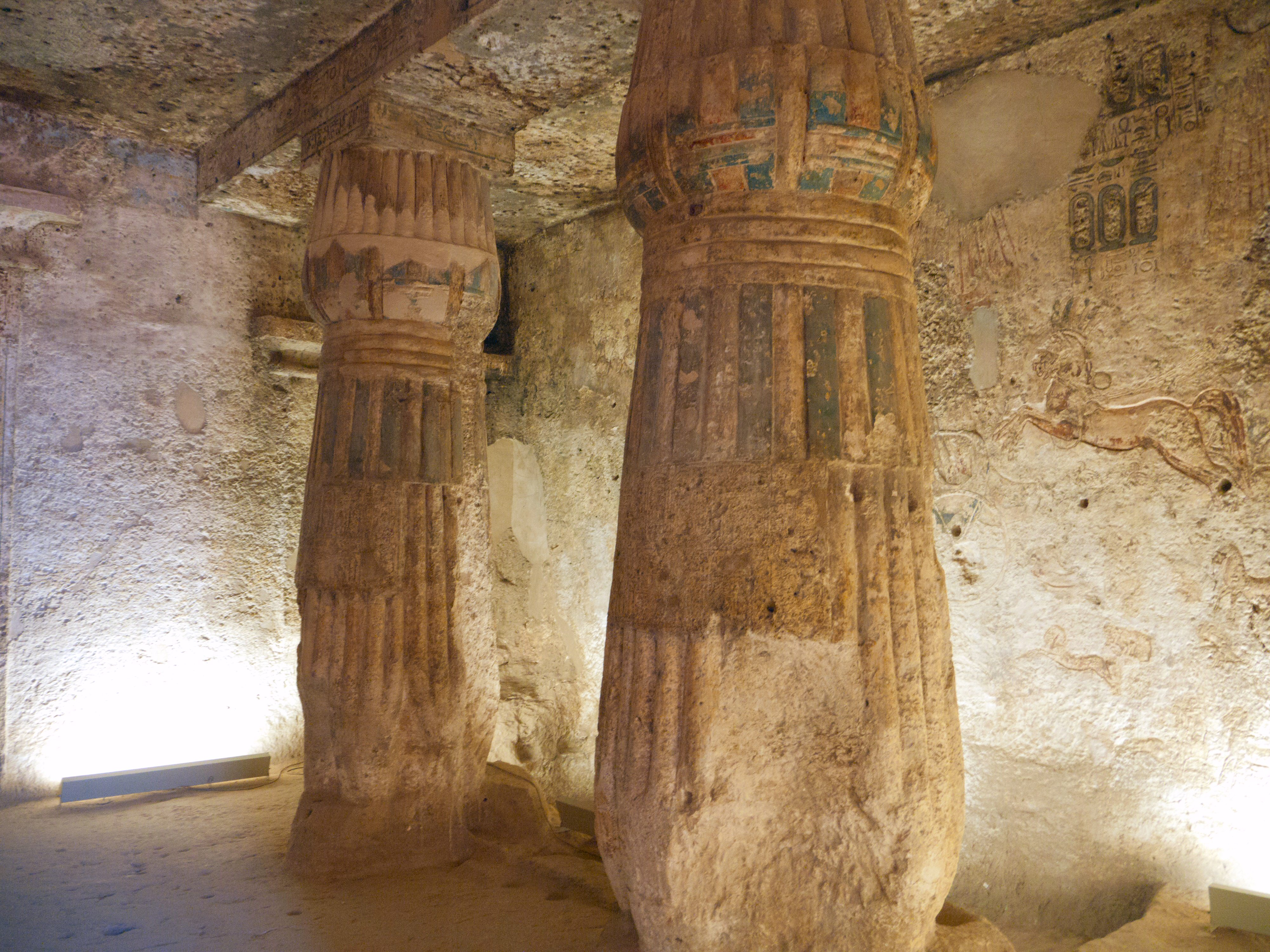
Columns at Panehesy's tomb, c. 1330 BC

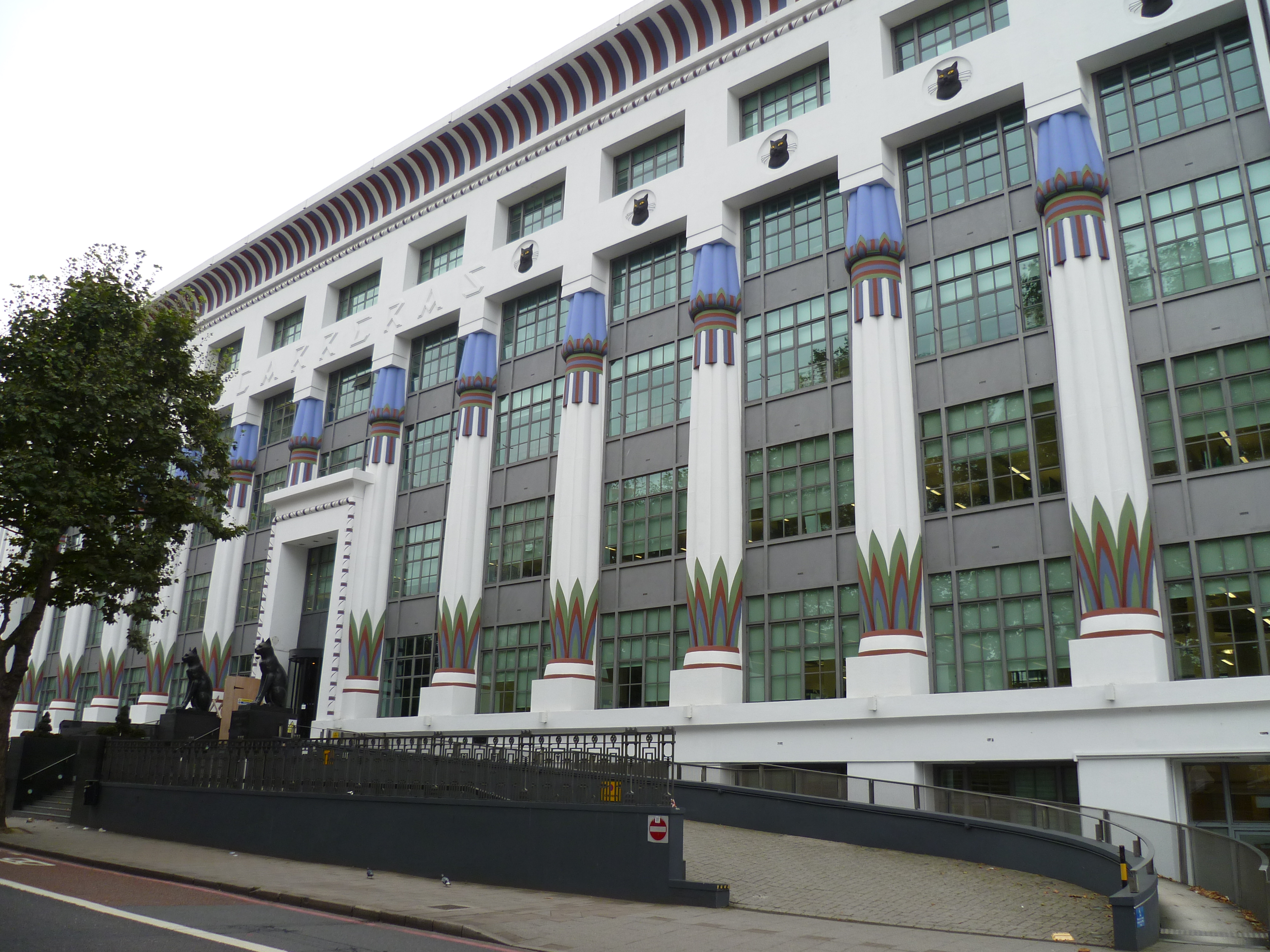
Carreras Cigarette Factory, Camden, 1926–1928

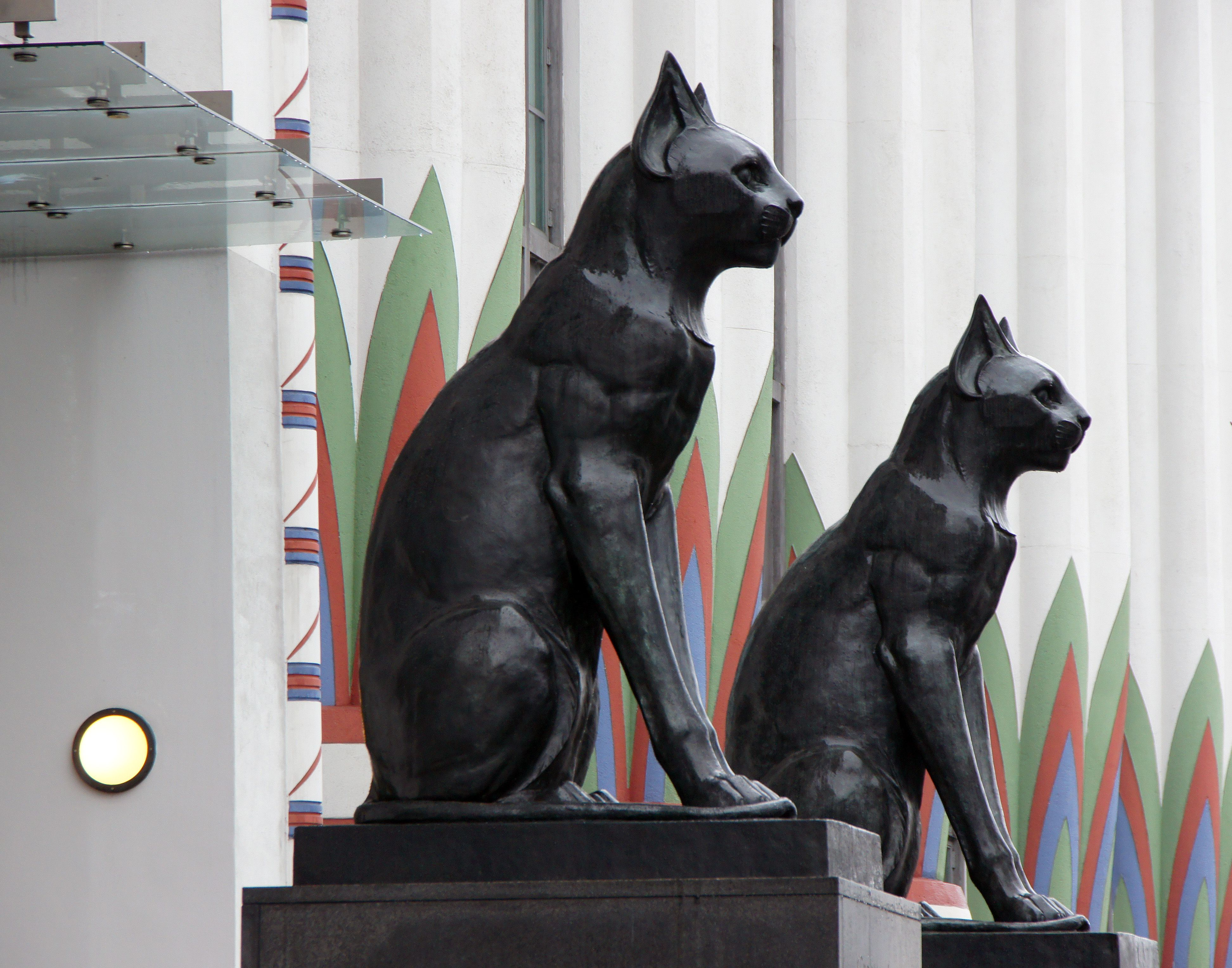
The pair of black cats, modelled on Bastet, guarding the factory entrance

== Contemporary ==
=== Post-war ===
Since the Second World War, architects have created impressive industrial buildings in a range of modern or post-modernist styles. One such is the Grade II* British Gas Engineering Research Station at Killingworth, which was built in 1967 to a design by Ryder and Yates. Historic England calls it a "tour de force of post-war architecture with deliberate references to continental examples in the transformation of service elements into sculptural forms". CZWG's Aztec West in the Bristol West Business Park uses horizontal stripes of brickwork interrupted by tall narrow windows and white concrete bevels to give a pilaster effect and, with its symmetrical concave-fronted buildings, an echo of Art Deco style.

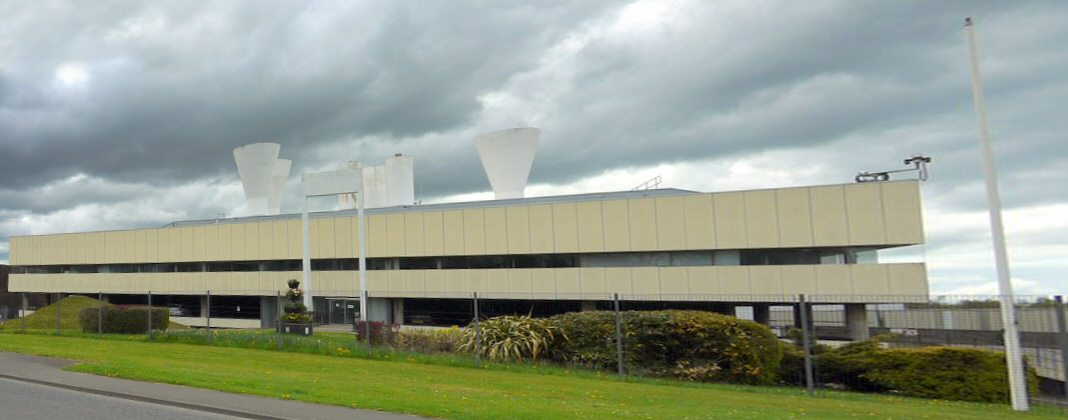
British Gas Engineering Research Station, Killingworth, 1967

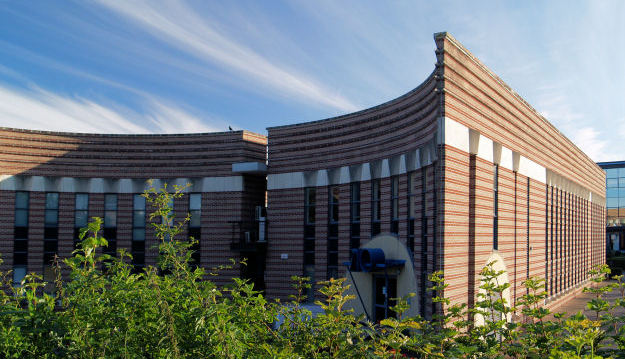
Aztec West, Bristol, by CZWG, 1987

=== 21st century ===
The partnership of architecture and engineering is seen in Heathrow Airport's Terminal 5 building, opened in 2008. It is 1,299 feet (396 m) long, 577 feet (176 m) wide and 130 feet (40 m) tall, making it the largest free-standing building in Britain. The roof is supported on exposed hinged trusses. The architects were Richard Rogers Partnership assisted by aviation architects Pascall+Watson, and the engineers were Arup for the above-ground works and Mott MacDonald for the substructures.

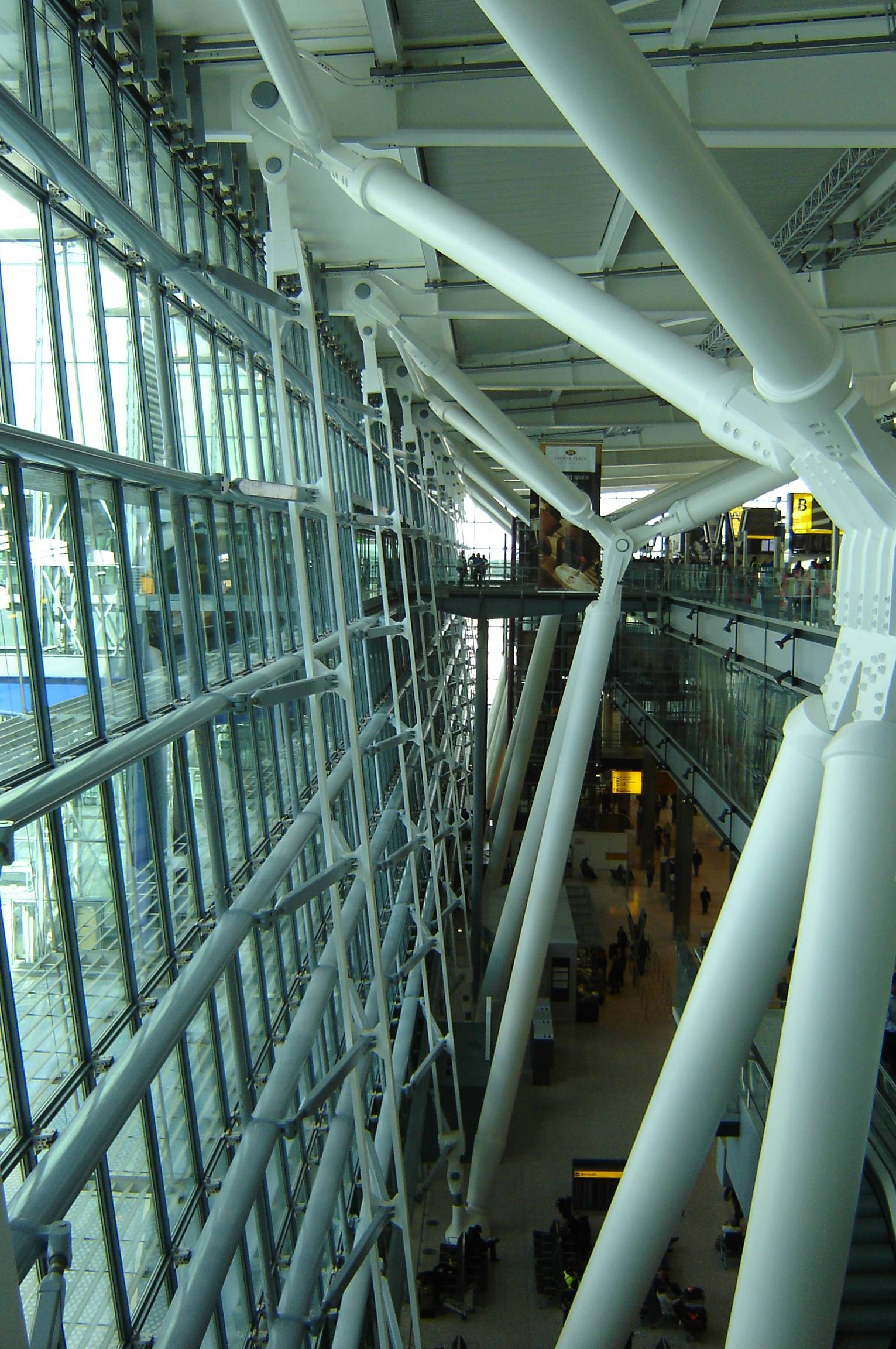
Exposed trusses inside Heathrow Airport's Terminal 5, 2008

== Sources ==
- Cherry, Bridget; Pevsner, Nikolaus (1991). The Buildings of England. London 3: North West. London: Penguin Books. ISBN 978-0-14-071048-9. OCLC 24722942.
- Historic England (April 2011). "Historical Summary". Industrial Buildings: Listing Selection Guide. Historic England. pp. 2–6.
- Jackson, Alan (1984) [1969]. London's Termini (Revised ed.). London: David & Charles. ISBN 0-330-02747-6.
- Jones, Edgar (1985). Industrial Architecture in Britain: 1750–1939. Oxford: Facts on File. ISBN 978-0-8160-1295-4. OCLC 12286054.
- Parissien, Steven (1997). Station to Station. London: Phaidon Press. ISBN 978-0-71483-467-2.
- Pearson, Lynn (2016). Victorian and Edwardian British Industrial Architecture. Crowood Press. ISBN 978-1-78500-189-5. OCLC 959428302.
- Pragnell, Hubert J. (2021) [2000]. Industrial Britain: an Architectural History. Batsford. ISBN 978-1-84994-733-6. OCLC 1259509747.
- Thomas, Bruce (1992). "Merthyr Tydfil and Early Ironworks in South Wales". In Garner, John (ed.). The Company Town: architecture and society in the early industrial age. New York: Oxford University Press. pp. 17–42. ISBN 978-1-4294-0727-4. OCLC 252590032.
- Winter, John (1970). Industrial Architecture: A Survey of Factory Building. London: Studio Vista. OCLC 473557982.
