= Dixon Hotel, Tooley Street =

Grade II listed hotel in Southwark, London, United Kingdom

Dixon Hotel
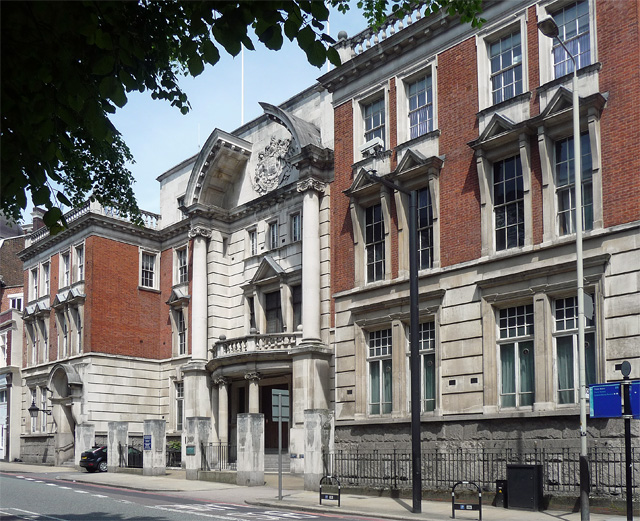
- "Quite spectacular of its date"

- Location within London Borough of Southwark
- 51.5023°N 0.0767°W
- Type: Hotel
- Location: Southwark, London

History
- Built: 1904-1906

Site notes
- Architect: John Dixon Butler
- Architectural style: Baroque Revival
- Owner: Marriott International

Listed Building – Grade II
- Official name: Tower Bridge Magistrates Court and Police Station and attached railings
- Designated: 17 September 1998
- Reference no.: 1385973

The Dixon Hotel, in Tooley Street in the London borough of Southwark, is a former magistrates' court and police station designed by John Dixon Butler. Opened in 1906, it operated as a court until closure in 2013. Subsequently sold, it re-opened as The Dixon, in honour of the building's architect, and became a hotel operating as part of the Marriott International group. It is a Grade II listed building.

== History and description ==
The architect John Dixon Butler (1860-1920) succeeded his father as Architect and Surveyor to the Metropolitan Police in 1895. Apprenticed to R. Norman Shaw, Dixon Butler worked under Shaw on the designs for New Scotland Yard (south building); the position being reversed at Canon Row Police Station where Butler was the lead architect and Shaw the assisting consultant. Dixon Butler went on to design over 200 public buildings, predominantly courts and police stations, across London. Historic England describes him as "one of the most accomplished Metropolitan Police architects". His architectural style was predominantly Baroque Revival and he was much influenced by Shaw. (Note: The architectural style employed by Shaw and Dixon Butler at New Scotland Yard was controversial. Shaw had been selected for the commission by the Home Secretary, Henry Matthews. His predecessor as Home Secretary, Sir William Harcourt repeatedly attacked the new building's design, "it is rather inferior in architectural beauty to the premises of Messrs. Crosse & Blackwell which face it on the other side of the river", going on to quote Byron, "the most recent was the least decent".)

The Dixon Hotel was designed as the Tower Bridge Police Court, latterly Tower Bridge Magistrates' Court and Police Station, in 1904 and opened in 1906. Built in stone and red brick laid in Flemish bond, the style is "Edwardian Baroque". The London: South Pevsner describes it as "quite spectacular of its date". It features doorcases with elaborate hoods, which became something of a Dixon Butler trademark. From the 1970s the Police Station at Tower Bridge was one of four bases for the Metropolitan Police’s Flying Squad, which specialised in responses to high-value armed robbery. The court closed in 2013 and was subsequently sold, re-opening as a hotel in 2019. The hotel's Courtroom Bar is located in the original magistrates' courtroom and a chandelier in the lobby is constructed from old handcuffs. The original wood panelling remains, and the judge’s bench has also been transformed into a bar, which sits beneath the judge's original oak canopy

== Sources ==
- Cherry, Bridget; Pevsner, Nikolaus (2002). London 2: South. The Buildings of England. Yale University Press. ISBN 978-0-300-09651-4. OCLC 844260066.
- Matthews, Roger (1996). Armed Robbery: Two Police Responses (PDF). Crime Prevention and Detection. Vol. 78. London: Home Office.
- Saint, Andrew (2010). Richard Norman Shaw. New Haven, US and London: Yale University Press. ISBN 9-780300-15526-6.
