= Canon Row Police Station =

Defunct annex to New Scotland Yard, Westminster, London

Coordinates: 51.5018°N 0.1253°W

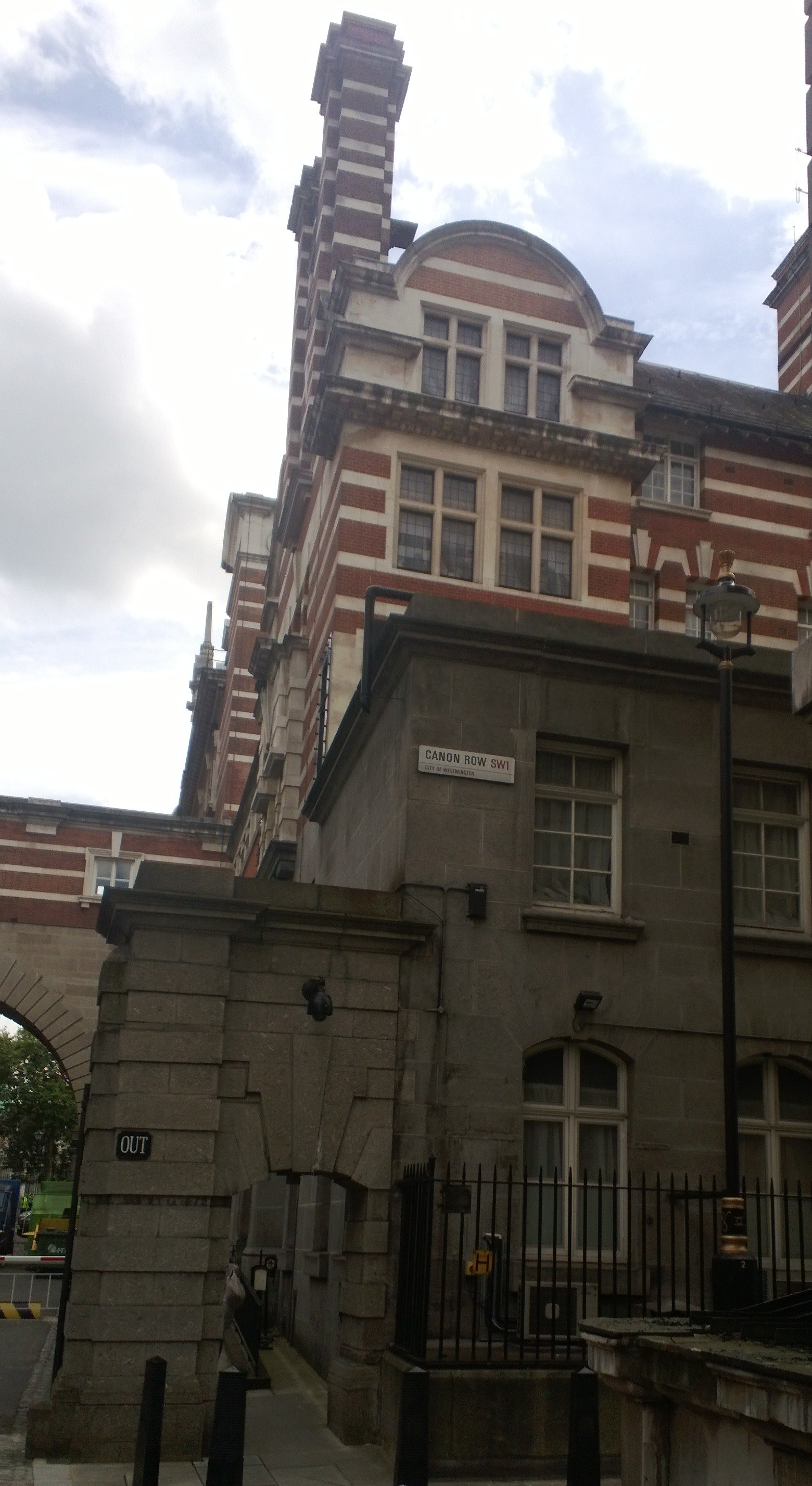
The Canon Row police station building in 2014

Canon Row Police Station in Canon Row, Westminster, was one of the Metropolitan Police's better known central London police stations. Replacing a leased station on King Street in St James's, it opened on 21 July 1902 in an extension to the Norman Shaw Buildings, then the home of New Scotland Yard. Canon Row Police Station was designed by the Metropolitan Police Surveyor, John Dixon Butler, with Richard Norman Shaw as consultant. The building is listed at Grade II*, and is no longer in use as a police station.

The code for the station was "AD", police phonetic code "Alpha Delta". The station was responsible for policing Buckingham Palace, Windsor Castle, the Palace of Westminster (Houses of Parliament), No 10 Downing Street, Clarence House, St James's Palace, and was responsible for all major events and demonstrations that took place in Central London. Officers from the station investigated many of the twentieth century’s most notable crimes; Dr Crippen was held in the cells at Canon Row after his arrest; and the cells were also used for the safe storage of the Jules Rimet Trophy following its recovery after the theft of the cup prior to the 1966 World Championship.

In 1985 the station moved to the Curtis Green Building, retaining the name 'Canon Row'. The new station was opened by Margaret Thatcher, the then Prime Minister. It closed in 1992 on its merger with Bow Street Police Station to form Charing Cross Police Station at the former Charing Cross Hospital site on Agar Street. The original Canon Row Police Station now forms part of the Parliamentary Estate.
