= John Dixon Butler =

English architect (1873–1958)

John Dixon Butler RA FRIBA
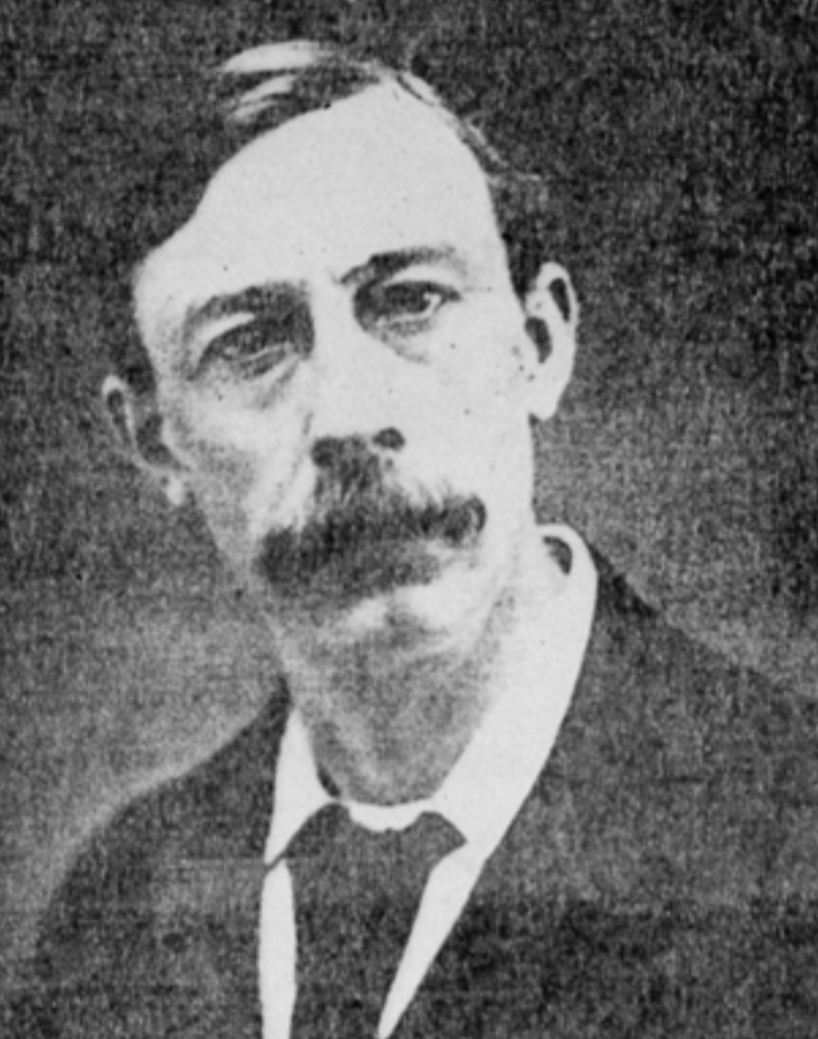
- Dixon Butler, pictured in a 1920 edition of The Builder
- Born: December 1860
- Died: 27 October 1920 (aged 59)
- Education: University College London; Architectural Association
- Occupation: Architect
- Parent: John Butler
- Practice: Chief Architect and Surveyor to the Metropolitan Police (1895–1920)

John Dixon Butler RA, FRIBA (December 1860 – 27 October 1920) was a British architect who for 25 years was the surveyor for the Metropolitan Police in London. He was the fifth architect to hold the post from its inception in 1842. He took over the role from his father in 1895.

Butler completed the designs and alterations to around 200 London police buildings, including ten courts; as of 2022, about 60 of his buildings survive. Historic England describe him as having been "one of the most accomplished Metropolitan Police architects" and have included around 25 of his buildings on the National Historic List of England and Wales.

Butler was born in London and studied architecture under Richard Norman Shaw, with whom he would assist on the designs for Canon Row Police Station (1898), and the Scotland Yard (south building) (1906) on London's Embankment. Butler's designs were usually in a domestic style sensitive to the context of the newly-developed suburban areas in which the stations were located. Each of his designs included strong municipal qualities such as iron railings, inscribed "Police" lintels, and other stone dressings.

Elected a fellow of the Royal Institute of British Architects (RIBA) in 1906, Butler worked up until his death in 1920. He was succeeded in the role of surveyor to the Metropolitan Police by Gilbert Mackenzie Trench.

== Early life ==
Dixon Butler was born in December 1860 at 11 Redcliffe Gardens, Chelsea, London. He was the only son and the second of two children to John Butler, an architect and the surveyor (later for the Metropolitan Police), and his wife, Hannah née Deavin. Dixon Butler studied at University College London and then the Architectural Association before being articled to his father from whom he learnt about the design and planning of police buildings.

== Surveyor to the Metropolitan Police ==
The Metropolitan Police Force Surveyorship was established in 1842; (Note: The post of Surveyor to the Metropolitan Police has been held by ten people since its establishment in 1842: Charles Reeves (1842–1866); Thomas Charles Sorby (1867–8); Frederick Caiger (1868–81); John Butler (1881–95); John Dixon Butler (1895–1920); Gilbert Mackenzie Trench (1921–47); John Innes Elliott (1947–74); M. Belchamber (1974–88); T. Lawrence (1988–2002); A. Croney (2002–?).) (Note: Mackenzie Trench was the designer of the Metropolitan Police box which was subsequently the inspiration for the TARDIS.) the force's first purpose-built station was built at Bow Street, erected two years after Sir Robert Peel's Metropolitan Police Act 1829.

In the 1880s there was a boom in the construction of police stations, following the political unrest and high-profile events such as the Whitechapel Murders. Under Dixon Butler, after 1895, police station interiors in London became more domesticated and an effort was made to make them more approachable to the public, including their relocation into more public areas. After a violent demonstration outside the station in Bow Street, the Metropolitan Police decided to have separate entrances at their stations for constables, away from the public, and to have officers live at the stations under the supervision of senior colleagues. Extra provisions were also made for the care of prisoners, including the introduction of ablution areas and exercise yards. Externally, Dixon Butler was careful to design them in a similar style to the surrounding, newly developed suburban areas in which they served.

Cherry, O'Brien and Pevsner, in their London: East volume of the Buildings of England series, record Dixon Butler's "unique" riverside police stations for the Thames River Police, founded in 1798 to combat piracy, including his station at Wapping which now houses the Thames River Police Museum. Dixon Butler's designs included features which give his buildings strong municipal accents, such as iron railings and lintels inscribed "Police" or "Police Station", set in stone dressings, and his frequent use of elaborate consoles to doors and windows. These elements give his designs their architectural quality creating a "characteristic type which can be recognised all over London". Historic England describes him as "one of the most accomplished Metropolitan Police architects".

Butler designed the police station on Bethnal Green Road, Tower Hamlets, in 1892 and his son refaced it in 1917, making it a rare example of both their work. Both father and son worked under Richard Norman Shaw on the designs for Scotland Yard; Butler on the North building, Dixon Butler on the South. The position was later reversed at Canon Row on London's Embankment, on which Dixon Butler was the lead architect and Norman Shaw acted as consultant.

== Buildings ==
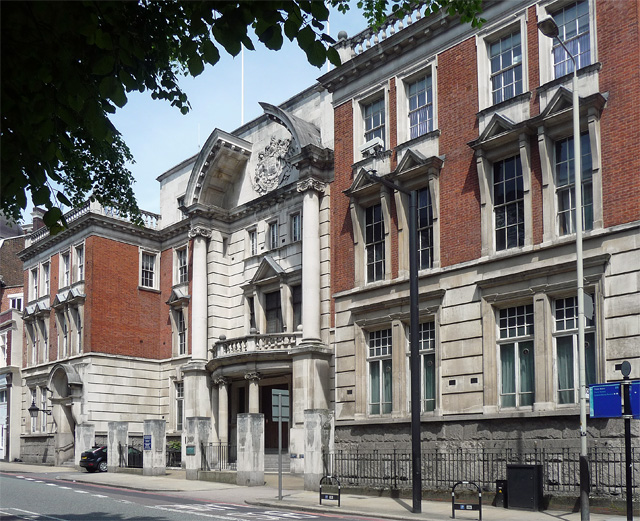
Tower Bridge Magistrates' Court and Police Station, now the Dixon Hotel. Named in honour of Dixon Butler, Cherry and Pevsner call it "quite spectacular of its date".

Dixon Butler completed about 200 buildings during his career, nearly all police stations, and around 10 courthouses; around 58 buildings survive. He designed Northwood Police Station in the Old English style, sensitive to the fact that at that time, Northwood was semi-rural, whilst acknowledging the proximity to London, through its station on the London Underground Metropolitan line. He designed similar police stations at Pinner and Kew, with the one at Pinner, designed in 1897, being the most domesticated of all his stations; it was equipped with living quarters for a married sergeant and his family, including two bedrooms, a living room, a scullery and a larder, a lobby, waiting room, inspector's office, charge room, parade room, three cells, a stable for two horses and an attached ambulance shed.

A number of Dixon Butler's existing buildings have been converted to other uses, including three, Tower Bridge Magistrates Court and Police Station now known as the Dixon Hotel, Marlborough Street Magistrates Court (now The Courthouse Hotel) and Shoreditch Magistrates Court and Police Station (now The Courthouse, Shoreditch), which have been converted to hotels. Historic England have included 25 of these buildings on the National Historic List of England and Wales. All are listed Grade II, with the exception of Canon Row Police Station which is given the higher grading of II*.

=== Known existing buildings ===
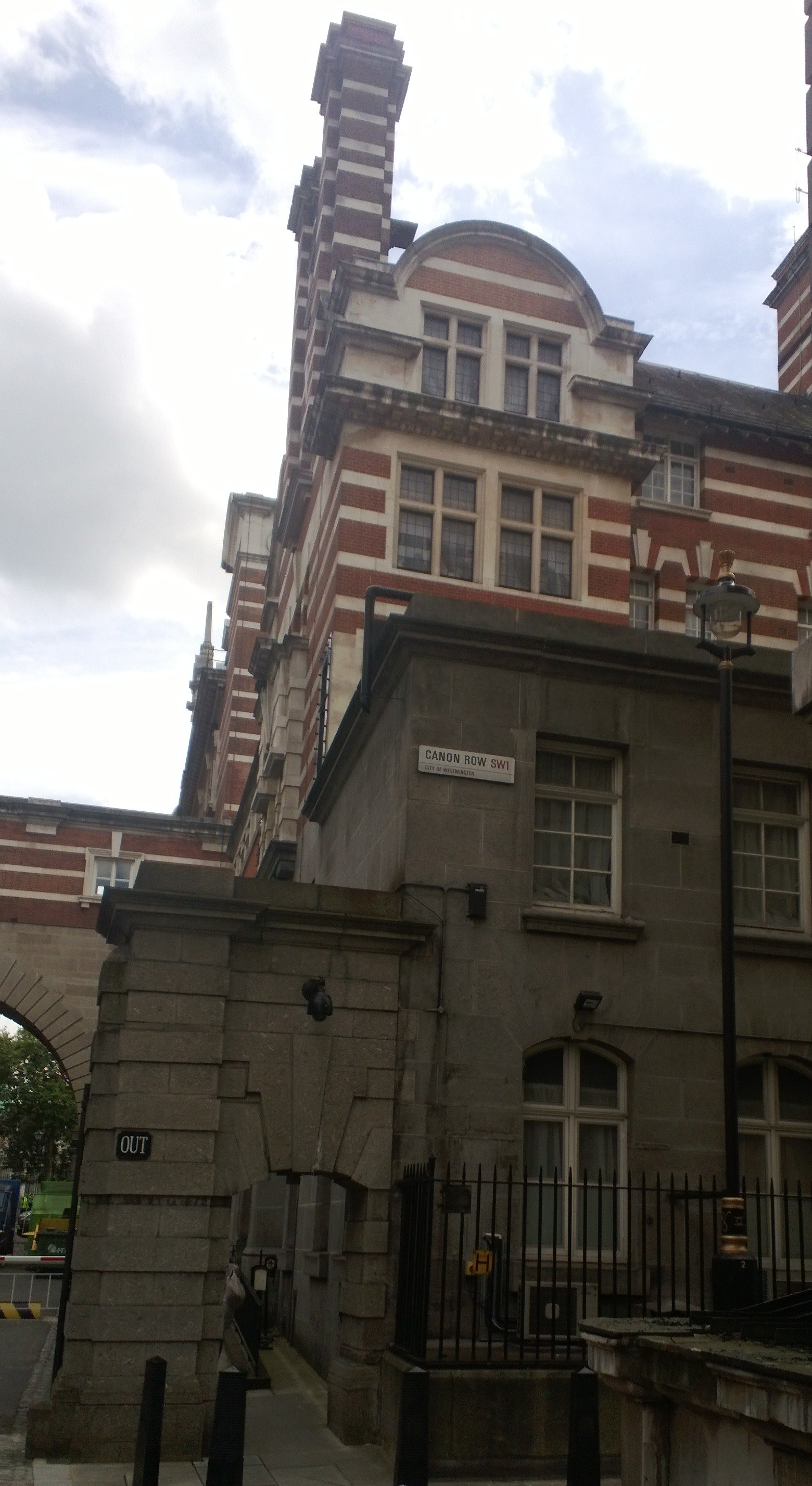
Former Canon Row Police Station, Victoria Embankment

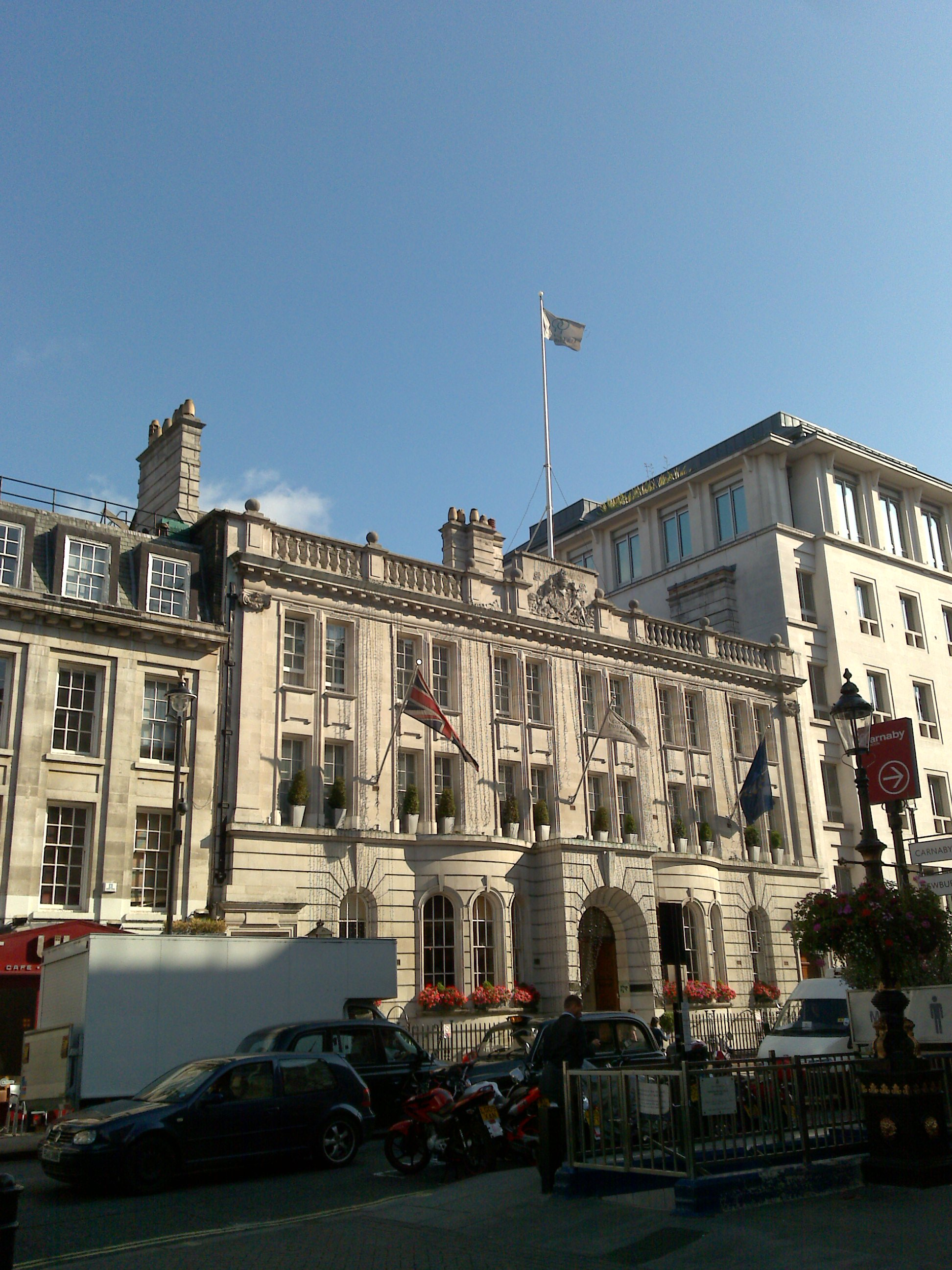
Former Marlborough Street Magistrates Court, now the Courthouse Hotel

- 1895–6 - Willesden Police Station, 96 High Road, Willesden, NW10 2PP. Closed as a police station and sold in 2013. The building still exists and is used as an art studio, as of 2025.
- 1896 - Kenley Police Station, Godstone Road, London Borough of Croydon. Sold in 2015. Now privately owned.
- 1896 - Greenford Police Station, 21 Oldfield Lane South, Greenford. Closed as a police station in 2013. Sold in 2021. As of 2025, the building remains.
- 1896 – Kentish Town Police Station, 10-12A Holmes Rd, Camden, NW5 3AE. The building was originally designed by Charles Reeves, the first surveyor of the Metropolitan Police, during his tenure (1842–1866), and underwent a restoration by Richard Norman Shaw in 1894-6. It is probable that Dixon Butler had some involvement in the Shaw restorations as it includes features that were characteristic in some of Dixon Butler's later buildings, including elongated door consoles and a date stamp on the door case at the main entrance, in this case "1896". As of 2025, the building is in operational use by the MPS.
- 1896 – Former Holborn Police Station, Theobalds Road, Holborn, London Borough of Camden, WC1. Located on the junction with Grays Inn Road. Closed in the mid 1960s to make way for a new building at 10 Lambs Conduit Street, Holborn, by John Innes Elliott. The original building is now used as office space.
- 1896-1906 – Former New Scotland Yard, Norman Shaw South Building (assisting Richard Norman Shaw). Designed 1896-98, built 1904-06. Originally known as Scotland House, it was built to provide office space for the Receiver for the Metropolitan Police District. Now part of the parliamentary estate.
- 1897 – Pinner Police Station, 1 Waxwell Lane, Pinner, London Borough of Harrow. Attempts were made to sell the building in 2013, but it was later retained. As of 2025 the station remains part of the MPS estate and is operational.
- 1898 – Camberwell Police Station, 22a Camberwell Church Street, Camberwell, London Borough of Southwark. Closed in 2019 and sold the following year. As of 2025, the building remains.
- 1898–1902 – Canon Row Police Station, Canon Row, Whitehall. Designed by Dixon Butler with Norman Shaw as consultant. In 1985 it was renamed 1 Canon Row and ceased to be a police station. Those who were based there moved to the neighbouring Curtis Green Building. The former Canon Row Police Station is now part of the Parliamentary Estate.
- 1899 – Lewisham Police Station, Ladywell Road, Lewisham.. Closed in 2003. Now in use as private dwellings.
- 1900 – Woodford Green Police Station, Manor Road, Woodford Green, London Borough of Redbridge. No longer a police station. As of 2025, the building exists as a veterinary clinic called "Claygate House".
- 1900 – Muswell Hill Police Station, 115 Fortis Green Road, Fortis Green, London Borough of Haringey. Closed in 2013 and converted to flats.
- 1900 - Wimbledon Police Station, 15-23 Queens Road, Wimbledon. As of 2025, the building is in operational use by the police.
- 1900–02 – The Old Police House, Hyde Park. Up until 2025 the building was used by the Royal Park's Police which was operated by the Metropolitan Police. The unit was scrapped in November 2025. Built by Butler for the Metropolitan Police, but on land owned by the Crown Estate, who now own the building. Use unknown.
- 1901 – Victoria Police Station, 63 Rochester Row, City of Westminster. Now occupied by private apartments.
- 1901 – Molesey Police Station, Walton Road, East Molesey (junction with Bridge Road and Esther Way). Closed by Surrey Police in 2010 and now in residential use.
- 1902 – Sidcup Police Station, 87 Main Road, Sidcup. Closed in 2014. As of 2026 it is a restaurant.
- 1902-10 – Gladstone House (now Gladstone Court) and Peel House (former police accommodation), 97-105 Regency Street, Pimlico, City of Westminster.
- 1903-08 – Old Street Magistrates Court and adjoining Police Station, 335 and 337 Old Street, London Borough of Hackney.
- 1903 - Lee Road Police Station, 418 Lee High Road, London Borough of Lewisham. Closed in 2003, now residential accommodation.
- 1903 – Bow Police Station, 111 Bow Road, Tower Hamlets. As of 2025, the building is still owned by the MPS and in operational use.
- 1903–04 – Victoria Magistrates Court, 69 Rochester Row, City of Westminster.
- 1904 – East Ham Police Station, 4 High Street South, East Ham, London Borough of Newham. Closed in 2014. Sold for development in 2018.
- 1904 – Gates and Piers to entrance to Derby Gate
- 1904 – Hackney Police Station, 2-4, Lower Clapton Road, London Borough of Hackney. Closed and sold in 2013. Now a school.
- 1904 – North Woolwich Police Station, Albert Road, London Borough of Newham.. Still in police ownership although non-operational.
- 1905 - Hampton Police Station, 60-68 Station Road, Hampton, London Borough of Richmond upon Thames. Closed in 2017 and converted to flats.
- 1906 – Ilford Police Station, 40 Ilford Hill, Ilford, London Borough of Redbridge. Sold in 2012. As of 2025, the building exists but use unknown.
- 1906 – Clerkenwell Magistrates Court, 76 King's Cross Road, Clerkenwell (junction with Gt. Percy Street). Now a hostel.
- 1906 – Tower Bridge Magistrates Court and adjoining Police Station, 211 Tooley Street, London Borough of Southwark.
- 1907 – Wapping Police Station, 94 Wapping High Street, Wapping.
- 1908 – Wood Green Police Station, 347 High Road, Wood Green. As of 2025, the building is still in operational use.
- 1908 – Sutton Police Station, 6 Carshalton Road, Sutton, SM1 4RF. As of 2025, the building is in operational use by the police.
- 1908 - Erith Police Station, 22 Erith High Street, Erith, London Borough of Bexley. Closed in 1979 and redeveloped into living accommodation.
- 1908 - Leytonstone Police Station, 470 High Road, Leytonstone, London Borough of Waltham Forest. Building exits as a school.
- 1908–09 – Wealdstone Police Station, 55 High Street, Harrow.
- 1909 – Wembley Park Police Station, 551 High Road, London Borough of Brent. Closed. As of 2025, the building was in use as restaurant.
- 1909 – Greenwich Magistrates Court, 7-9 Blackheath Road, London Borough of Greenwich.
- 1909–10 – Police Section House, 40 Beak Street, Soho,. Acquired by the artist Damien Hirst in 2018 and turned into office space. Original building no longer exists.
- 1910 – Highbury Vale Police Station, 209 Blackstock Rd, Islington. Sold in 2012. Now flats.
- 1910 – Woolwich Police Station, Market Street, Woolwich.
- 1910 – Barking Police Station, Ripple Road, Barking. As of 2025, the building exists as shops and living accommodation.
- 1910 - Harlesden Police Station, 76 Craven Park, Harlesden.
- 1910 - Northwood Police Station, 2 Murray Road, Northwood, Hillingdon. Closed and sold by the MPS in 2021. As of 2025 the building is vacant and is subject to planning discussions to be utilised as a children's nursery.
- 1911 – Harrow Road Police Station, Maida Vale. Sold in 2013 and redeveloped into flats (2016). As part of the redevelopment, two new residential blocks were built on the southern part of the site. To commemorate the architect, one of the blocks was named Butler House, and the eastern entrance was named Dixon Butler Mews.
- 1911-12 – Former Battersea Police Station, 112-118 Battersea Bridge Road, Battersea, London Borough of Wandsworth. Closed in 2014 and sold. Redeveloped into flats.
- 1912 - Deptford Police Station, 114-116 Amersham Vale, Deptford, SE14 6LG. Closed in 2017. Domestic housing proposed.
- 1912 – Streatham Police Station, Streatham High Road, Streatham Hill, Merton. Closed in 2014 and sold for redevelopment. Empty, as of 2022.
- 1912 – Plaistow Police Station, Barking Road, Plaistow. Still in operational use by the police, as of 2025.
- 1912 – Woolwich Magistrates Court, Calderwood Street, Woolwich. now flats.
- 1912–13 – Marlborough Street Magistrates Court, 19-21 Great Marlborough Street, Westminster (court and police station). The building closed as a court in 1998 and is now a luxury hotel called "The Courthouse Hotel, London".
- 1913 – Hampstead Police Station and Court House, 26 Rosslyn Hill, Hampstead.
- 1913 – Tottenham Police Station, Tottenham High Road,Tottenham. As of 2025, still operational.
- 1914 - Kew Police Station, 96 North Road, Kew, London Borough of Richmond-upon-Thames. Closed in 1933 as part of a reorganisation of the police estate by Hugh Trenchard, the then Commissioner of Police of the Metropolis.
- 1914 – West London Magistrates Court, Southcombe Street, Hammersmith Closed as a court and converted to offices in 2006. Closed completely and sold in 2017. Redeveloped into private flats.
- 1915 - Winchmore Hill Police Station, 687 Greens Lane, Winchmore Hill, Enfield. The station closed in 2013 and was sold in 2015 for £950,000. As of 2025 the building exists.
- 1915 - Bromley Police Station, Widmore Road, London Borough of Bromley. Located on the junction of Kentish Way. Closed in 2003 and converted into flats.
- 1915-16 - Edmonton Police Station, 314 Fore Street, Upper Edmonton, Enfield. Closed in the 1980s when new premises were built at 462 Fore Street. As of 2025 the old building exists.
- 1916 – Golders Green Police Station, 1069 Finchley Road, Golders Green, London Borough of Barnet. Closed in 2013 and sold the following year. The building exists and has been redeveloped into flats.
- 1917 – Bethnal Green Police Station, 458 Bethnal Green Road, Bethnal Green. In 1917 Dixon Butler re-designed the facade and made enlargements to an existing building that had been designed by his father, John Butler, in 1892. The station closed after 1991 and it now exists as office space for the Providence Row Housing Association. The replacement police station was built in 1997 and is located in nearby Victoria Park Square.
- 1920–25 – Former Police Station and Magistrates Court, Aylward Street and East Arbour Street, Mile End - now flats. Designed by Dixon Butler, who died early on into the project; finished by his successor, Gilbert Mackenzie Trench.

== Personal life and death ==
In his spare time Dixon Butler participated in amateur dramatics. In an April 1890 edition of the Croydon Guardian and Surrey County Gazette he is listed as a member of the Selwood Operatic Company and performed in a small concert in aid of St James's Church, Croydon. Five years later, according to The Stage, he, along with a group of other architects including George Baron Carvill, took part in a production of King Arthur (Note: King Arthur (also King Arthur: A Drama in a Prologue and Four Acts) was a play by Joseph Comyns Carr, produced by Henry Irving at the Lyceum Theatre, London, in 1895.) at the London Scottish Reserves HQ in Buckingham Gate. The play was advertised as being "a burlesque written for architects by architects" and featured an architectural-themed twist to its plot; the part of the King (played by Dixon Butler) was a district surveyor who had, under his care, three articled pupils, Sirs Lancelot (Albert L. Harris) Mordred (Herbert Phillips Fletcher, brother to Banister Fletcher) and Percival (C.V Cable).

Like his father, Dixon Butler was an active Freemason and became a member of the Baldwin Lodge in Dalton-in-Furness on 11 June 1890; five years later, he was initiated at the Mount Moriah Lodge, Tower Hill. He married Hannah Frazer (1854–1924) in March 1901; they had no children. He was elected a fellow of the Royal Institute of British Architects (RIBA) in 1906.

Up until his death Dixon Butler lived in Molesey, Surrey. He died at King's College Hospital on 27 October 1920 and was interred in the churchyard of St John's, Woking. He was succeeded in the role of surveyor to the Metropolitan Police by Gilbert Mackenzie Trench, the same year. Dixon Butler's Tower Bridge Police Station and Court, now a hotel, is named The Dixon in commemoration of him.

== Sources ==
- Bradley, Simon; Pevsner, Nikolaus (2003). London 6: Westminster. The Buildings of England. New Haven, US and London: Yale University Press. ISBN 978-0-300-09595-1. OCLC 844722686.
- Cherry, Bridget; O'Brien, Charles; Pevsner, Nikolaus (2005). London 5: East. The Buildings of England. New Haven, US and London: Yale University Press. ISBN 978-0-300-10701-2. OCLC 1159868585.
- Cherry, Bridget; Pevsner, Nikolaus (2002a). London 2: South. The Buildings of England. Newhaven, US and London: Yale University Press. ISBN 978-0-300-09651-4. OCLC 844260066.
- Cherry, Bridget; Pevsner, Nikolaus (2002b). London 3: North West. The Buildings of England. Newhaven, US and London: Yale University Press. ISBN 978-0-300-09652-1. OCLC 844442257.
- Cherry, Bridget; Pevsner, Nikolaus (2002c). London 4: North. The Buildings of England. Newhaven, US and London: Yale University Press. ISBN 978-0-300-09653-8. OCLC 719418475.
- O'Brien, Charles; Nairn, Ian; Cherry, Bridget (2022). Surrey. The Buildings of England. London: Yale University Press. ISBN 978-0-300-23478-7.
- Saint, Andrew (2010). Richard Norman Shaw. New Haven, US and London: Yale University Press. ISBN 9-780300-15526-6.
- Sanderson, Eileen (2021). London Police Stations. Stroud, Gloucestershire: Amberley Publishing. ISBN 9-781398-10016-9.
