= List of courts in England and Wales =

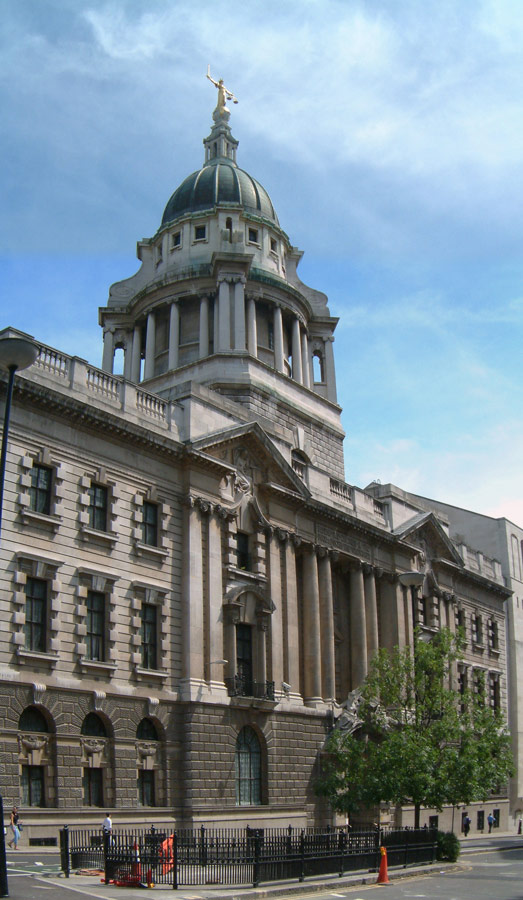
The Central Criminal Court, better known as the Old Bailey

This is a list of courts in England and Wales. For information about the different types of court see Courts of England and Wales.

== Civil courts ==
The highest appellate court is the Supreme Court of the United Kingdom, followed by the Court of Appeal. The highest court in which originating process may be issued is the High Court of England and Wales. The High Court is based at the Royal Courts of Justice and the Rolls Building in London and in district registries elsewhere.

=== District registries of the High Court ===
==== England ====
- Bedford
- Birkenhead
- Birmingham
- Bradford
- Bristol
- Canterbury
- Cambridge
- Chester
- Chichester
- Colchester
- Croydon
- Dewsbury
- Halifax
- Hove
- Leeds
- Leicester
- Lincoln
- Liverpool
- Lewes
- Manchester
- Newcastle upon Tyne
- Norwich
- Nottingham
- Oxford
- Scarborough
- Sheffield
- Southampton
- Teesside (in Middlesbrough)
- Warrington
- Weymouth and Dorchester
- Winchester
- Worksop

==== Wales ====
- Aberystwyth
- Blackwood
- Brecknock
- Bridgend
- Caernarfon
- Cardiff
- Carmarthen
- Haverfordwest
- Llangefni
- Merthyr Tydfil
- Mold
- Newport
- Pontypridd
- Rhyl
- Swansea
- Welshpool

=== County Court ===
When the county court system was created as a result of the County Courts Act 1846 (9 & 10 Vict. c. 95), there were 491 county courts in England and Wales. Since the Crime and Courts Act 2013 came into force, there has been one County Court in England and Wales, sitting simultaneously in many different locations.

== Criminal courts ==
=== Crown Court ===
The Crown Court deals with serious criminal charges and with less serious charges where the accused has elected trial at the Crown Court instead of trial at a magistrates' court. The Crown Court also hears appeals against conviction and sentence from magistrates. There are 91 locations in England and Wales at which the Crown Court regularly sits. Crown Court centres are designated in one of three tiers: first-tier centres are visited by High Court judges for criminal and also for civil cases (in the District Registry of the High Court); second-tier centres are visited by High Court judges for criminal work only; and third-tier centres are not normally visited by High Court judges. High Court judges hear 2% of cases at the Crown Court, but 27% of the most serious (Class 1) cases. Circuit judges and recorders sit at all three tiers, hearing 88% and 10% of the cases respectively. When the Crown Court is conducting a trial, the judge sits with a jury of twelve; when hearing appeals from magistrates, the judge sits with two (or sometimes four) magistrates.

The Crown Court was established by the Courts Act 1971, which came into force on 1 January 1972, following the recommendations of a royal commission chaired by Lord Beeching. Previously, criminal cases that were not dealt with by magistrates were heard by assizes and quarter sessions, in a system that had changed little in the preceding centuries. The Crown Court system is administered by His Majesty's Courts and Tribunals Service, an executive agency of the Ministry of Justice. England is divided into six regions by HMCS (London, Midlands, North East, North West, South East and Western), with the whole of Wales forming a seventh region.

Section 78 of the Supreme Court Act 1981 provides that the Crown Court can conduct business at any location in England and Wales, in accordance with directions given by the Lord Chancellor. This power is sometimes used to enable court sittings to take place away from one of the regular Crown Court venues. For example, in 2007, a sitting of the Crown Court was held at one of the oldest court buildings in England or Wales, the former courthouse in Beaumaris, Anglesey, which was built in 1614 and closed in 1997.

=== Magistrates' courts ===
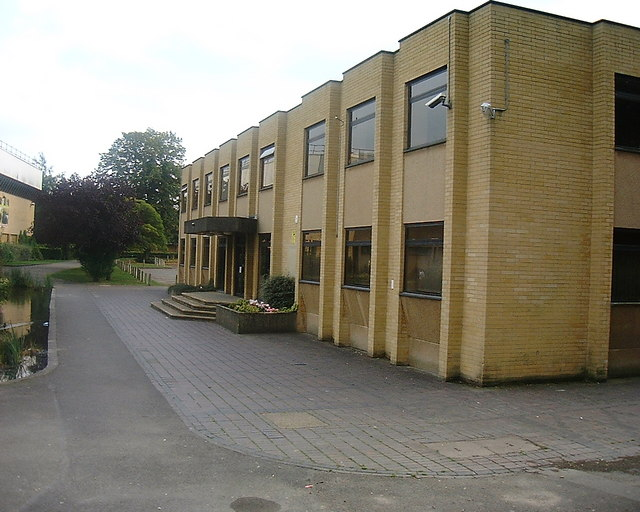
Andover Magistrates' Court

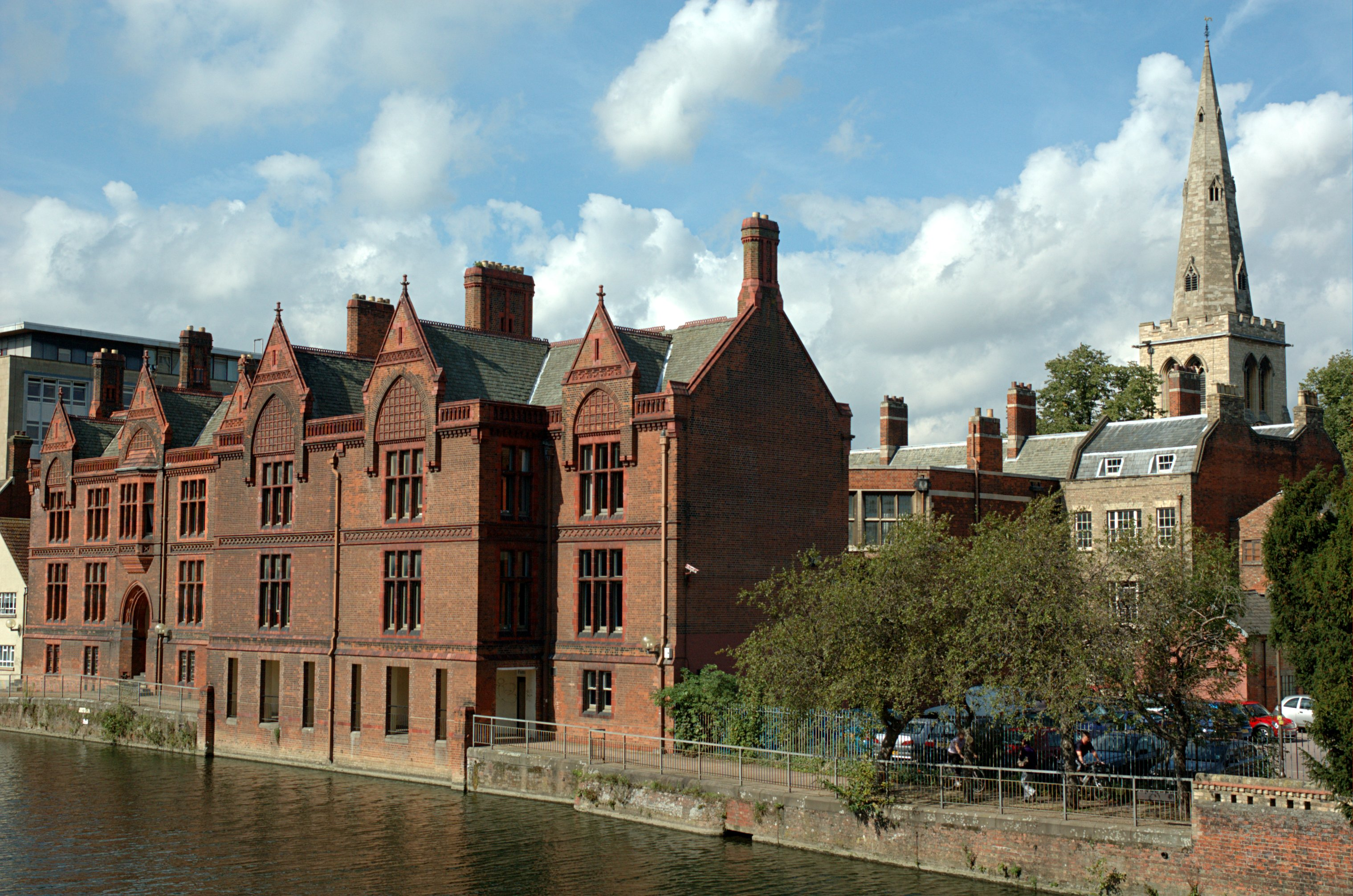
Bedford Magistrates' Court

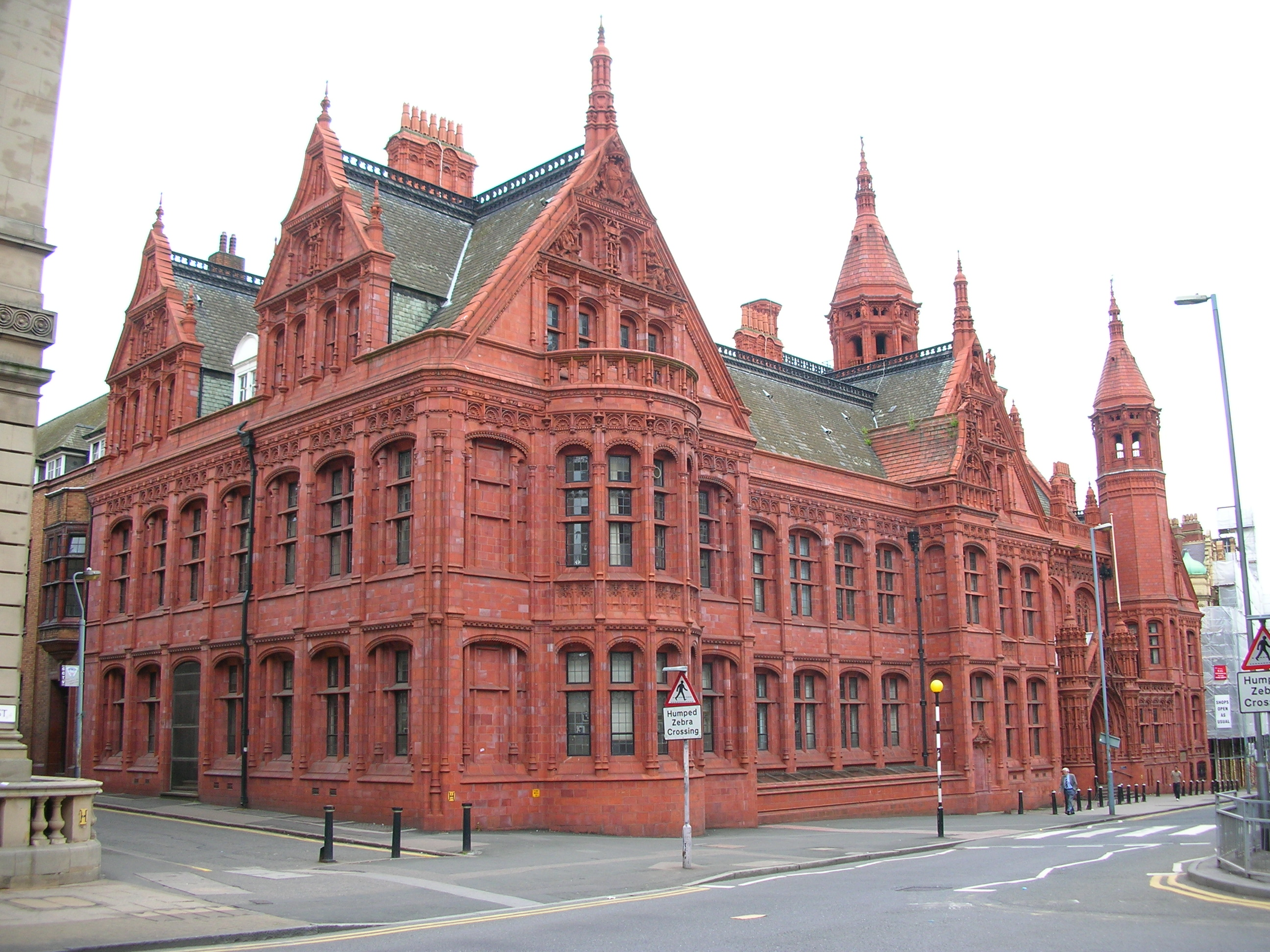
Birmingham Magistrates' Court

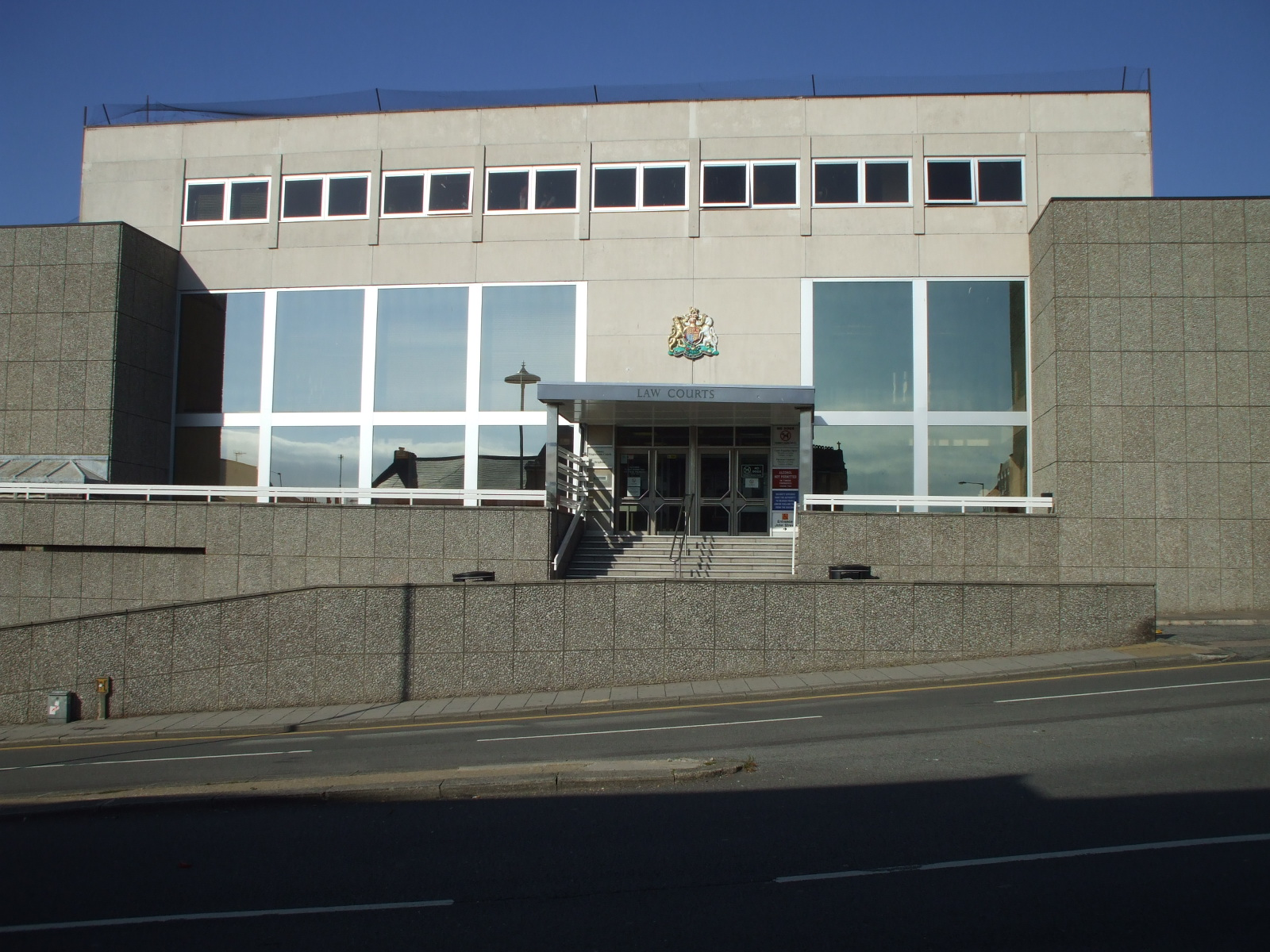
Brighton Magistrates' Court

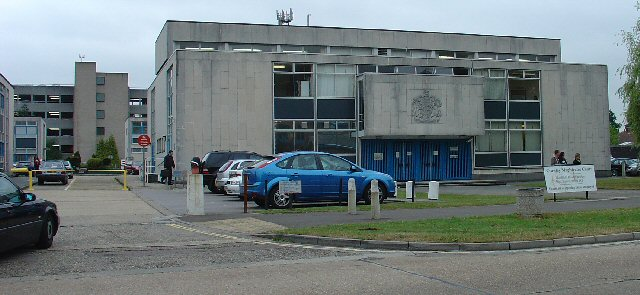
Crawley Magistrates' Court

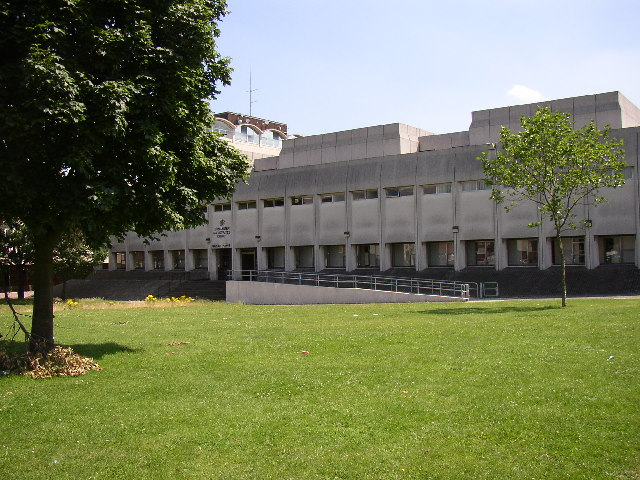
Doncaster Magistrates' Court

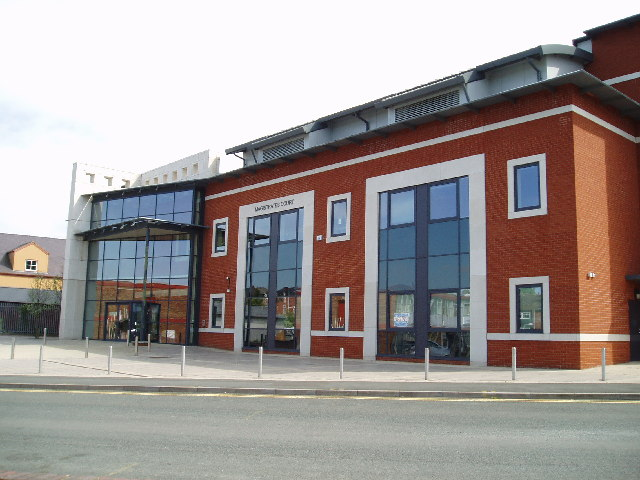
Kidderminster Magistrates' Court

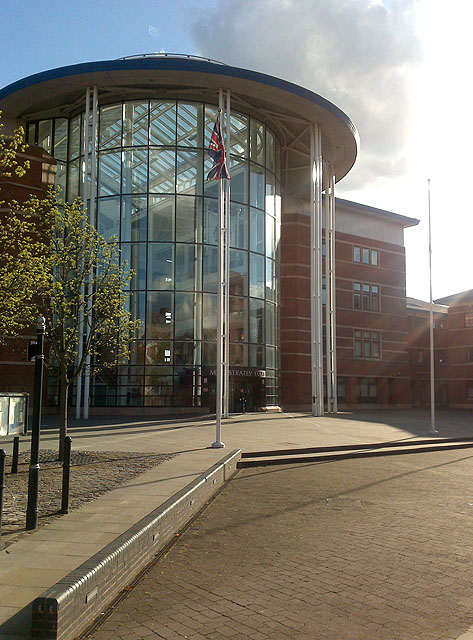
Nottingham Magistrates' Court

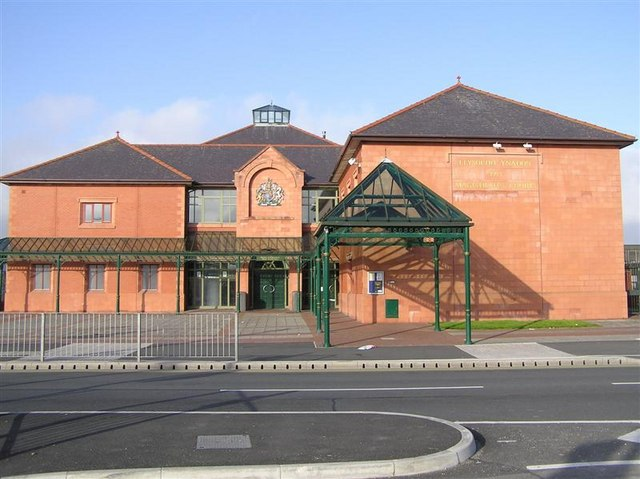
Llandudno Magistrates' Court

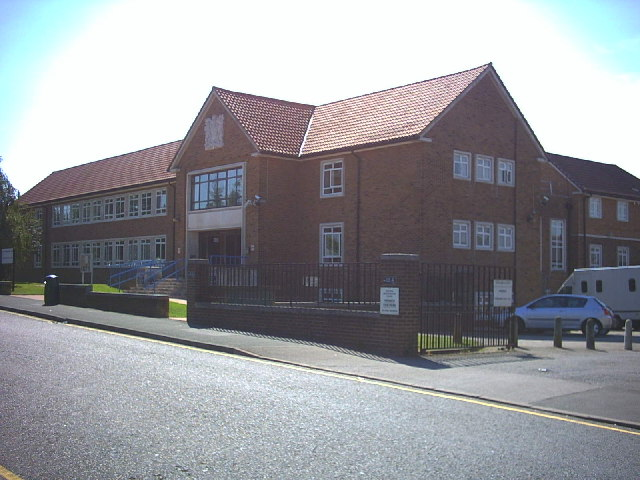
Sutton Magistrates' Court

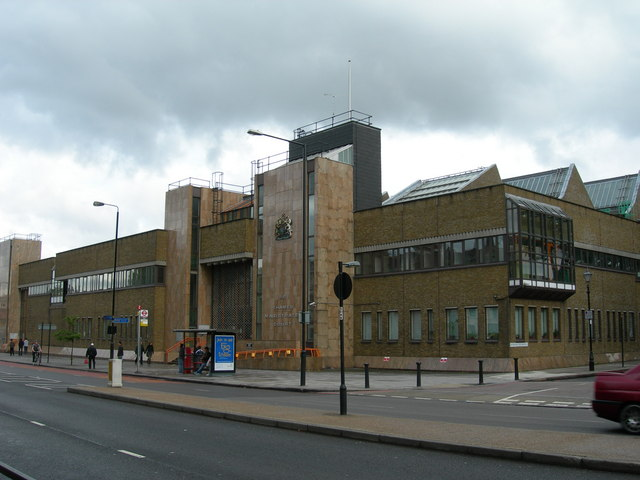
Thames Magistrates' Court

As of 2020:

- Aberystwyth Justice Centre
- Aldershot Justice Centre
- Barkingside Magistrates' Court
- Barnsley Law Courts
- Barnstaple Magistrates Court
- Barrow-in-Furness Magistrates Court
- Basildon Magistrates' Court
- Basingstoke Law Courts
- Bath Law Courts
- Berwick upon Tweed Magistrates' Court
- Beverley Magistrates' Court
- Bexley Magistrates' Court
- Birmingham Magistrates Court at the Victoria Law Courts
- Blackburn Magistrates' Court
- Blackpool Magistrates' Court
- Bodmin Law Courts
- Bolton Combined Court
- Boston Courthouse
- Bradford and Keighley Magistrates' Court
- Bridlington Magistrates' Court
- Brighton Magistrates' Court
- Bristol Magistrates' Court
- Bromley Magistrates' Court
- Burnley Magistrates' Court
- Caernarfon Justice Centre
- Cambridge Magistrates' Court
- Cannock Magistrates' Court
- Canterbury Magistrates' Court
- Cardiff Magistrates' Court
- Carlisle Magistrates' Court
- Chelmsford Magistrates' Court
- Cheltenham Magistrates' Court
- Chester Magistrates' Court
- Chesterfield Justice Centre
- City of London Magistrates' Court
- Colchester Magistrates' Court
- Coventry Magistrates' Court
- Crawley Magistrates' Court
- Crewe Magistrates and County Court
- Croydon Magistrates' Court
- Cwmbran Magistrates' Court
- Darlington Magistrates' Court
- Derby Justice Centre
- Doncaster Justice Centre North (Doncaster Magistrates' Court)
- Dudley Magistrates' Court
- Ealing Magistrates' Court
- East Berkshire (Slough) Magistrates' Court
- Exeter Combined Court Centre
- Folkestone Magistrates' Court
- Gateshead Law Courts
- Great Yarmouth Magistrates' Court
- Grimsby Magistrates' Court
- Guildford Law Courts
- Harrogate Justice Centre
- Hastings Law Courts
- Hatfield Magistrates' Court
- Haverfordwest Magistrates' Court
- Hendon Magistrates' Court
- Hereford Justice Centre
- High Wycombe Law Courts
- Highbury Corner Magistrates' Court
- Horsham Law Courts
- Hull and Holderness Magistrates' Court
- Huntingdon Law Courts
- Ipswich Magistrates' Court
- Isle of Wight Combined Court
- Isles of Scilly Magistrates' Court
- Kidderminster Magistrates' Court
- King's Lynn Magistrates' Court
- Kirklees (Huddersfield) Magistrates' Court
- Lancaster Courthouse
- Lavender Hill Magistrates' Court
- Leeds Magistrates' Court
- Leicester Magistrates' Court
- Lincoln Magistrates' Court
- Liverpool Magistrates' Court
- Llandrindod Wells Magistrates' Court
- Llandudno Magistrates' Court
- Llanelli Law Courts
- Loughborough Magistrates' Court
- Luton and South Bedfordshire Magistrates' Court
- Maidstone Magistrates' Court
- Manchester Magistrates' Court
- Mansfield Magistrates' Court
- Margate Magistrates' Court
- Medway (Chatham) Magistrates' Court
- Merthyr Tydfil Combined Court Centre
- Mid and South East Northumberland Law Courts (Bedlington)
- Milton Keynes Magistrates' Court
- Mold Justice Centre (Mold Law Courts)
- Newcastle upon Tyne Magistrates' Court
- Newport (South Wales) Magistrates' Court
- Newton Abbot Magistrates' Court
- Newton Aycliffe Magistrates' Court
- North Somerset Courthouse
- North Staffordshire Justice Centre / Newcastle-Under-Lyme Magistrates Court
- North Tyneside Magistrates' Court
- Northampton Magistrates' Court
- Norwich Magistrates' Court
- Nottingham Magistrates' Court
- Oxford and Southern Oxfordshire Magistrates' Court
- Peterborough Magistrates' Court
- Peterlee Magistrates' Court
- Plymouth Magistrates' Court
- Poole Magistrates' Court
- Portsmouth Magistrates' Court
- Preston Magistrates' Court
- Reading Magistrates' Court and Family Court
- Redditch Magistrates' Court
- Reedley Magistrates' Court
- Romford Magistrates' Court (formerly Havering Magistrates' Court)
- Salisbury Law Courts
- Scarborough Justice Centre
- Sefton Magistrates' Court
- Sevenoaks Magistrates' Court
- Sheffield Magistrates' Court
- Skipton Magistrates Court
- South Tyneside Magistrates Court
- South Worcestershire Magistrates' Court
- Southend Court House
- St Albans Magistrates' Court
- Staines Law Courts
- Stevenage Magistrates' Court
- Stockport Magistrates Court
- Stratford Magistrates Court
- Sunderland Magistrates’ Court
- Swansea Magistrates' Court
- Swindon Magistrates' Court
- Tameside Magistrates' Court
- Taunton Magistrates' Court
- Teesside Magistrates' Court
- Telford Justice Centre
- Thames Magistrates' Court
- Truro Magistrates' Court
- Uxbridge Magistrates' Court
- Walsall Magistrates' Court
- Warrington Crown and Magistrates' Court
- Warwickshire (North) Justice Centre
- Warwickshire (South) Justice Centre
- Wellingborough Magistrates' Court
- Welshpool Magistrates' Court
- West Cumbria Courthouse
- West Hampshire (Southampton) Magistrates' Court
- Westminster Magistrates' Court
- Weymouth Combined Court
- Wigan and Leigh Courthouse
- Willesden Magistrates' Court
- Wimbledon Magistrates' Court
- Wirral Magistrates' Court
- Wolverhampton Magistrates' Court (at Old Town Hall, Wolverhampton)
- Belmarsh Magistrates Court
- Worcester Justice Centre
- Worthing Law Courts
- Wrexham Law Courts
- Yeovil Law Courts
- York Magistrates' Court

=== Former Magistrates' courts ===
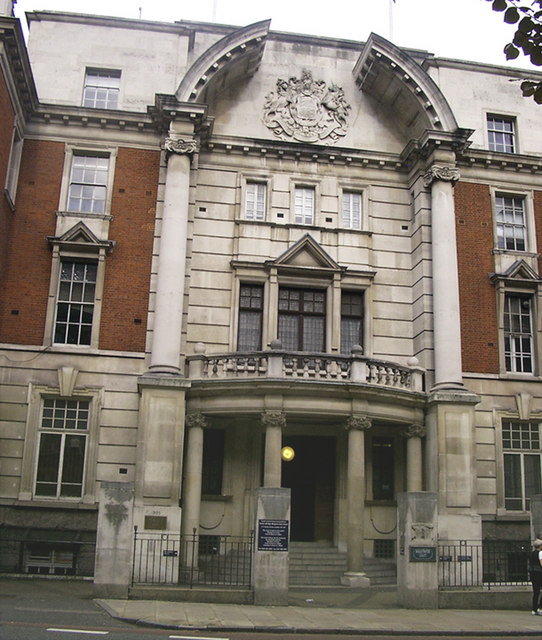
Tower Bridge Magistrates' Court – now the Dixon Hotel

==== Closed 2010-2020 ====
These courts were shut in the period 2010-2020:

- Aberdare Magistrates' Court
- Abergavenny Magistrates' Court
- Abertillery Magistrates Court
- Accrington Magistrates' Court
- Acton Magistrates' Court
- Alnwick Magistrates Court
- Alton Magistrates' Court
- Amersham Magistrates Court
- Ammanford Magistrates Court
- Andover Magistrates Court
- Ashford Magistrates Court
- Aylesbury Magistrates' Court
- Banbury Magistrates' Court
- Barking & Dagenham Magistrates Court
- Barry Magistrates Court
- Batley & Dewsbury Magistrates Court
- Bicester Magistrates' Court
- Bingley (Keighley) Magistrates Court
- Bishop Auckland Magistrates Court
- Blandford Forum Magistrates Court
- Blaydon Magistrates Court
- Bournemouth Magistrates' Court
- Bracknell Magistrates' Court
- Brecon Law Courts
- Brentford Magistrates Court
- Bridgend Law Courts
- Bridgwater Magistrates Court
- Burton upon Trent Magistrates' Court
- Bury Magistrates' Court
- Bury St Edmunds Magistrates' Court
- Buxton Magistrates' Court
- Caerphilly Magistrates' Court
- Camberwell Green Magistrates' Court
- Camborne Magistrates Court
- Cardigan Magistrates Court
- Carmarthen Law Courts (The Guildhall)
- Chepstow Magistrates Court
- Chichester Magistrates' Court
- Chippenham Magistrates' Court
- Chorley Magistrates' Court
- Cirencester Magistrates Court
- Coalville Magistrates Court
- Coleford Magistrates Court
- Consett Magistrates' Court
- Corby Magistrates' Court
- Cromer Magistrates Court
- Dartford Magistrates' Court
- Daventry Magistrates Court
- Denbigh Magistrates Court
- Didcot Magistrates Court
- Dolgellau Magistrates' Court
- Dover Magistrates' Court
- East Berkshire Magistrates' Court, Maidenhead
- Eastbourne Magistrates' Court
- Ely Magistrates Court
- Epping Magistrates Court
- Epsom Magistrates Court
- Fareham Magistrates' Court
- Feltham Magistrates' Court
- Fleetwood Magistrates' Court
- Flint Magistrates Court
- Frome Magistrates Court
- Gloucester Magistrates' Court
- Goole Magistrates Court
- Gosforth Magistrates Court
- Grantham Magistrates' Court
- Grays Magistrates Court
- Greenwich Magistrates' Court
- Guisborough (East Langbaurgh) Magistrates Court
- Halesowen Magistrates Court
- Halifax Magistrates' Court (Calderdale)
- Hammersmith Magistrates' Court
- Haringey Magistrates Court
- Harlow Magistrates' Court
- Harrow Magistrates Court
- Hartlepool Magistrates' Court
- Hemel Hempstead Magistrates Court
- Hinckley Magistrates' Court
- Holyhead Magistrates' Court
- Honiton Magistrates Court
- Houghton-Le-Spring Magistrates Court
- Ilkeston Magistrates Court
- Kendal Magistrates' Court
- Kettering Magistrates' Court
- Kingston-upon-Thames Magistrates Court
- Knowsley Magistrates Court
- Lewes Magistrates Court
- Liskeard Magistrates Court
- Llandovery Magistrates Court
- Llangefni Magistrates Court
- Llwynypia Magistrates Court
- Lowestoft Magistrates' Court
- Ludlow Magistrates Court
- Lyndhurst Magistrates Court
- Macclesfield Magistrates' Court
- Market Drayton Magistrates Court
- Market Harborough Magistrates Court
- Melton Mowbray Magistrates Court
- Mid-Sussex (Haywards Heath) Magistrates Court
- Neath Magistrates' Court
- Newark Magistrates Court
- North Liverpool Community Justice Centre
- Northallerton Magistrates' Court
- Northwich Magistrates Court
- Oldham Magistrates' Court
- Ormskirk Magistrates' Court
- Oswestry Magistrates Court
- Penrith Magistrates Court
- Penzance Magistrates Court
- Pontefract Magistrates Court
- Pontypridd Magistrates' Court
- Prestatyn Magistrates' Court
- Pwllheli Magistrates Court
- Rawtenstall Magistrates Court
- Redhill Magistrates' Court
- Retford Magistrates Court
- Richmond upon Thames Magistrates' Court
- Rochdale Magistrates Court
- Rotherham Magistrates' Court
- Rugby Magistrates Court
- Runcorn (Halton) Magistrates' Court
- Rutland Magistrates' Court
- Salford Magistrates Court
- Sandwell Magistrates' Court
- Scunthorpe Magistrates' Court
- Stoke on Trent Magistrates Court
- Shrewsbury Magistrates' Court
- Sittingbourne Magistrates Court
- Skegness Magistrates' Court
- Solihull Magistrates' Court
- Southport (North Sefton) Magistrates Court
- Spalding Magistrates' Court
- St Helens Magistrates' Court
- Stafford Magistrates Court
- Selby Magistrates Court
- Stroud Magistrates' Court
- Sudbury Magistrates Court
- Sutton Coldfield Magistrates Court
- Sutton Magistrates Court
- Swaffham Magistrates Court
- Tamworth Magistrates Court
- Thetford Magistrates Court
- Torquay Magistrates' Court
- Totnes Magistrates Court
- Tottenham Magistrates' Court
- Towcester Magistrates Court
- Tower Bridge Magistrates Court, now a hotel
- Trafford Magistrates' Court
- Tynedale (Hexham) Magistrates Court
- Wakefield & Pontefract Magistrates' Court
- Waltham Forest Magistrates' Court
- Wantage Magistrates Court
- Warrington Magistrates' Court
- Watford Magistrates Court
- West Berkshire Magistrates' Court (Newbury)
- West Bromwich Magistrates Court
- City of Westminster Magistrates' Court (former Horseferry Road Magistrates' Court)
- Whitehaven Magistrates Court
- Wimborne Magistrates Court
- Wisbech Magistrates Court
- Witney Magistrates Court
- Woking Magistrates Court
- Woolwich Magistrates Court
- Worksop Magistrates' Court
- Yate Magistrates' Court

==== Earlier Closures ====
- Bakewell Magistrates Court
- Eccles Magistrates Court
- Kingsbridge Magistrates Court
- Southwell Magistrates Court
- Teignmouth Magistrates Court
- Bow Street Magistrates' Court

== See also ==
- His Majesty's Courts and Tribunals Service
