= Single justice procedure =

English criminal law procedure

The single justice procedure (SJP; Welsh: gweithdrefn cyfiawnder sengl) was introduced by the Criminal Justice and Courts Act 2015 in England and Wales. Under this procedure, a single magistrate, with a legally qualified adviser, can try minor non-imprisonable offences without a court hearing, unless the defendant chooses to attend a hearing in court.

== Procedure ==
Under this procedure, a single magistrate, supported by a legally qualified adviser, tries summary non-imprisonable offences by adults or companies without a court hearing, if the defendant has either pleaded guilty or not responded to notification of prosecution. The defendant can instead choose to attend a hearing in court. The government states that the procedure is designed to be an accessible, speedy, effective and more efficient means of delivering justice when dealing with the most minor summary offences, but it has been criticised.

== Scope ==
Typical offences dealt with via this means include minor road traffic offences such as speeding and driving without insurance, TV licence evasion and similar matters. It was also used to prosecute breaches of lockdown rules during the COVID-19 pandemic. Defendants receive notice of the charge by post, including a statement setting out the facts of the offence, and guidance about what next steps to take, including their rights to legal representation. They have the option to plead guilty by post, online or to ask for a court hearing in person. If a defendant pleads "not guilty" their case will be transferred out of the single justice procedure process, and listed for a in-person court hearing in the usual manner. Those pleading guilty, or those who do not respond to the initial notice within 21 days, will have their cases dealt with by a single justice of the peace based on the submitted paperwork alone, without either the prosecutor or defendant being present in person.

Approximately 535000 cases were heard in magistrates' courts in England and Wales via this procedure in 2020. Typically, prosecutions are brought by the Crown Prosecution Service, but the process is also used to bring private prosecutions by, for example, train companies and the TV Licensing company.

According to HM Courts and Tribunals Service (HMCTS), "Between 1 April 2019 and 30 September 2023, 3,102,392 criminal cases were received into the Single Justice Service, which includes 609,164 receipts through the reformed digital service".

== Advantages and criticisms of the single justice procedure ==
HMCTS argue that the single justice procedure "is not a radical new innovation, but a modification of existing procedures dating from the Magistrates' Court Act 1957". The procedure frees up time for the Crown Prosecution Service and the magistrates' courts to focus on more serious and complex offences, and enables defendants to plead guilty and have their cases heard by a magistrate, without having to go to court. However, criticisms have been made that the process is not adequately transparent, with it happening largely behind "closed doors", and some concerns were raised during the coronavirus pandemic over the dilution of legal advice to magistrates after it had emerged that magistrates were being required to share access to a single legal adviser over the phone or via Microsoft Teams.

HMCTS has published a protocol on sharing court lists, registers and documents with the media, with a section dealing specifically with the SJP. It sets out an approach to circulating lists of pending SJP cases, verdicts (results/register) and sentences, and makes clear that accredited journalists should be provided with the prosecution statement of facts and exhibits, and any defence representations in mitigation, subject to judicial restrictions that may prohibit it, in the same way as for any magistrates' court hearing. Members of the general public must apply for judicial adjudication if they request this information.

The Magistrates' Association says that the SJP needs reform "if it is to be seen as fair and transparent", citing flaws in the way it operates that can "harm ... some of society's most vulnerable people". Proposed improvements to the system as implemented as of 2024 include requiring all defendants' pleas and mitigations to be heard by prosecutors before the hearing, and elimination of the effect of time pressure on decisions.

In 2024 Judge Goldspring, the Chief Magistrate of England and Wales, ruled the use of SJPNs by rail companies to be unlawful in certain cases, saying "parliament did not envisage" train fare offences being prosecuted using SJPs. Four UK railway companies were found accountable for using SJPs unlawfully. Both Northern Trains and Greater Anglia have acknowledged their involvement. Judge Goldspring estimated up to 75,000 convictions will be overturned and refunded by his ruling.

In September 2026, London Mayor Sadiq Khan was found guilty in his absence under the single justice procedure for an untaxed car registered in his name by a third party. The mayor had been subject to protests about the expansion of the Ultra Low Emission Zone, with some protesters claiming they planned to register cars in Khan's name to make him liable for charges. A Khan spokesperson said "It's not the first time the mayor has been the victim of a scam involving people falsely stating that Sadiq is the owner of a vehicle. Such behaviour is illegal, and the DVLA are aware." Nevertheless the prosecution by the DVLA went ahead, despite an inaccurate address having been registered, and consequently Khan did not receive any notices of prosecution. The mayor may have to appear in court to try to overturn his criminal conviction under the procedure.
