= Marlborough Street Magistrates Court =

Courthouse in Westminster, London, England

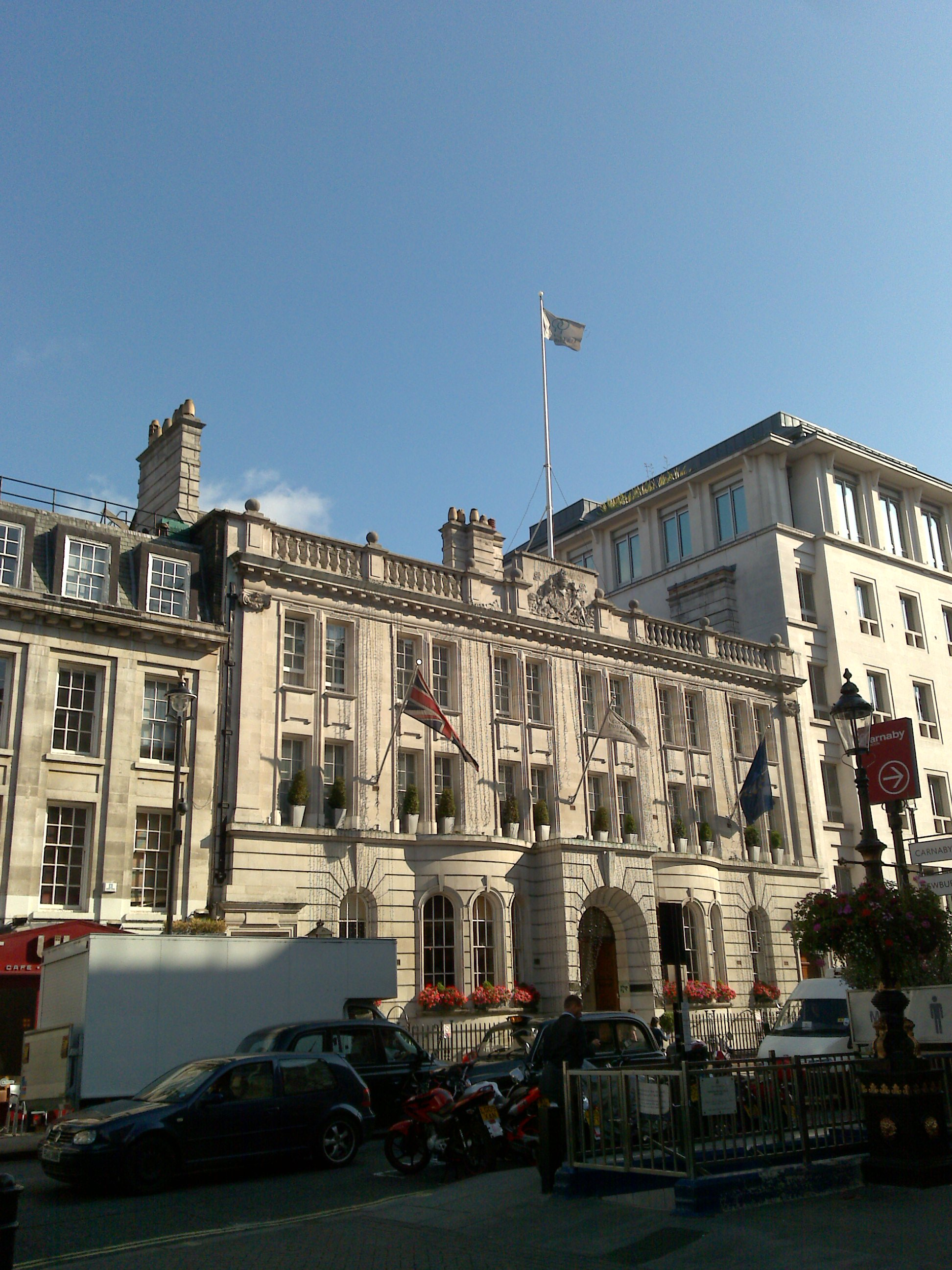
- The former court buildings, now a hotel

- Location within Central London

General information
- Location: 19–21 Great Marlborough Street, Soho, London, England, United Kingdom
- Coordinates: 51°30′51.62″N 0°8′22.13″W

Technical details
- Floor count: 6

Design and construction
- Architect: John Dixon Butler

Other information
- Number of rooms: 108 rooms and 9 suites, total 116
- Number of suites: 9
- Number of restaurants: 2 restaurants, 2 bars

Website
- http://www.courthouse-hotel.com/

Marlborough Street Magistrates Court was a court of law at 19–21 Great Marlborough Street, Soho London, between the late 18th and late 20th centuries. It was designed by the Surveyor to the Metropolitan Police, John Dixon Butler. The court saw many significant trials, including those of Oscar Wilde, Christine Keeler, Keith Richards and John Lennon. The court closed in 1998 and is now The Courthouse Hotel London, a 5-star hotel next to London Palladium Theatre, and opposite Carnaby Street and Liberty London.

== History ==
The Courthouse Hotel is located in the old Grade II listed Marlborough Street Magistrates Court building, which was the second-oldest magistrates court in the UK, dating back to the 1800s.

The building has a turbulent history from its time as the Marlborough Street Magistrates Court, which set the scene for many famous cases over the years, involving figures such as John Lennon, Oscar Wilde, Johnny Rotten, Mick Jagger and Keith Richards.

In 1835 Charles Dickens worked as a reporter in previous building which stood on the same site, for the Morning Chronicle, and Louis Napoleon appeared in court as witness in a fraud case between attempts to establish a second empire in France in 1847. In 1895 Oscar Wilde sued the Marquess of Queensberry for criminal libel. The current building was designed between 1912 and 1913 by the Surveyor to the Metropolitan Police, John Dixon Butler.

In 1963 Christine Keeler was taken to court over sex allegations which led to the Profumo scandal becoming public. In 1966 Bob Monkhouse faced a charge of conspiracy to defraud film distribution companies, and in 1967 former television presenter Katie Boyle gave evidence against a man facing careless driving charges after an accident. The building was centre to Mick Jagger's 1969 court case in which he was fined £200 for drugs charges. In 1973 fellow Rolling Stones member Keith Richards was fined £205 for possession of marijuana, heroin, mandrax, a revolver and an antique shotgun.

In 1970 John Lennon was taken to court for exhibiting pictures deemed too sexually explicit in the London Art Gallery at 22 New Bond Street, and artist Francis Bacon was accused of possessing cannabis. In 1971 songwriter Lionel Bart was taken to the courthouse charged with drug possession and in 1977 Sex Pistols singer Johnny Rotten was fined £40 for possessing amphetamine sulphate. The last notable case before it became a hotel was in 1981 when John Miller, who masterminded the kidnapping of Ronnie Biggs, appeared in court after being arrested on arrival back from Barbados.

In December 1982 David Martin escaped whilst attending a remand hearing at the Court. Using the roof he managed to get across to the Palladium Theatre, prompting a huge Police manhunt.

=== Hotel ===
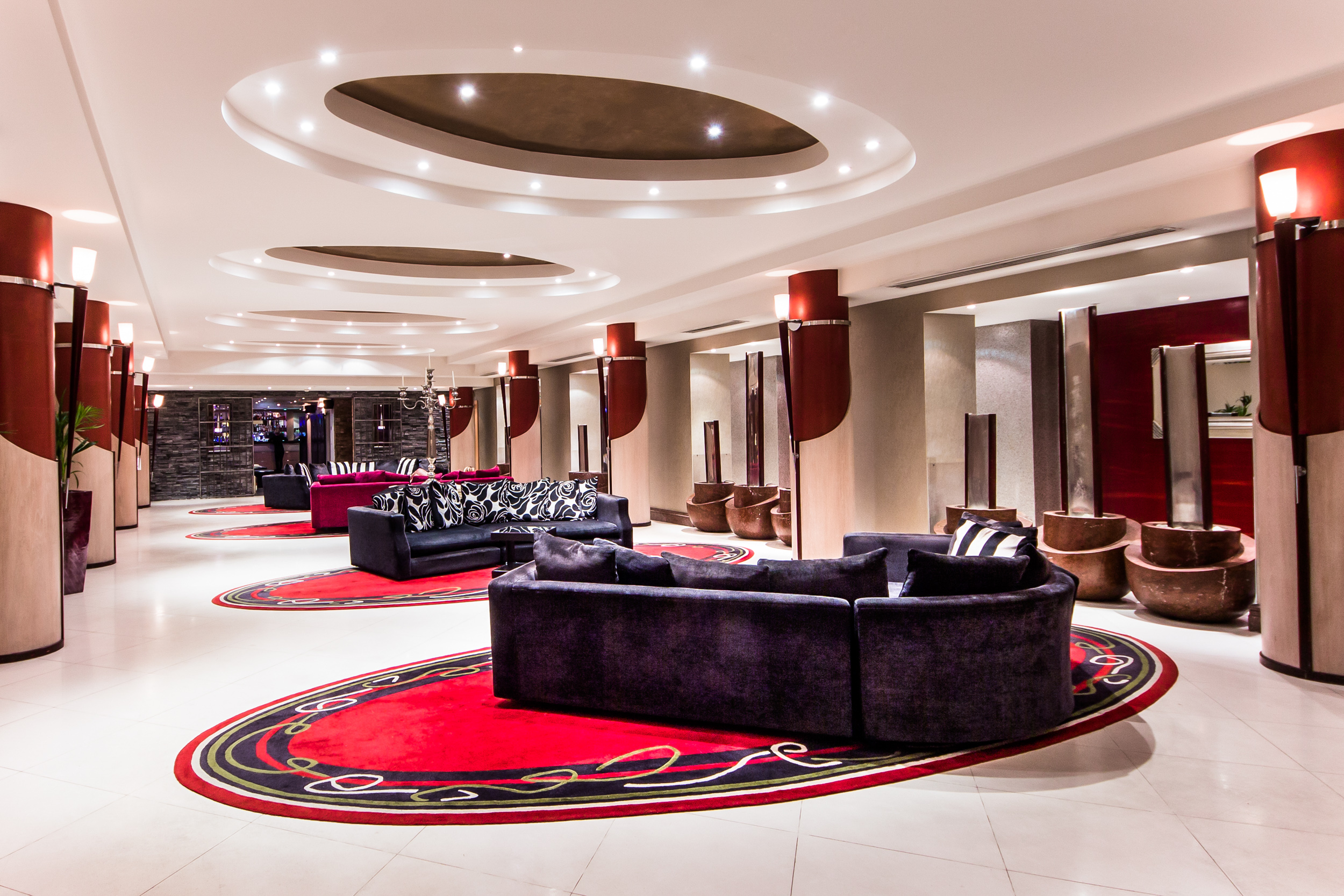
Courthouse Hotel London, Lobby

The Magistrates Suites are located in the high-ceiling Judges quarters on the first, second and third floor of the original building, and contain the original Robert Adams fireplaces and oak flooring.
