= New Scotland Yard (building) =

Building in City of Westminster, London

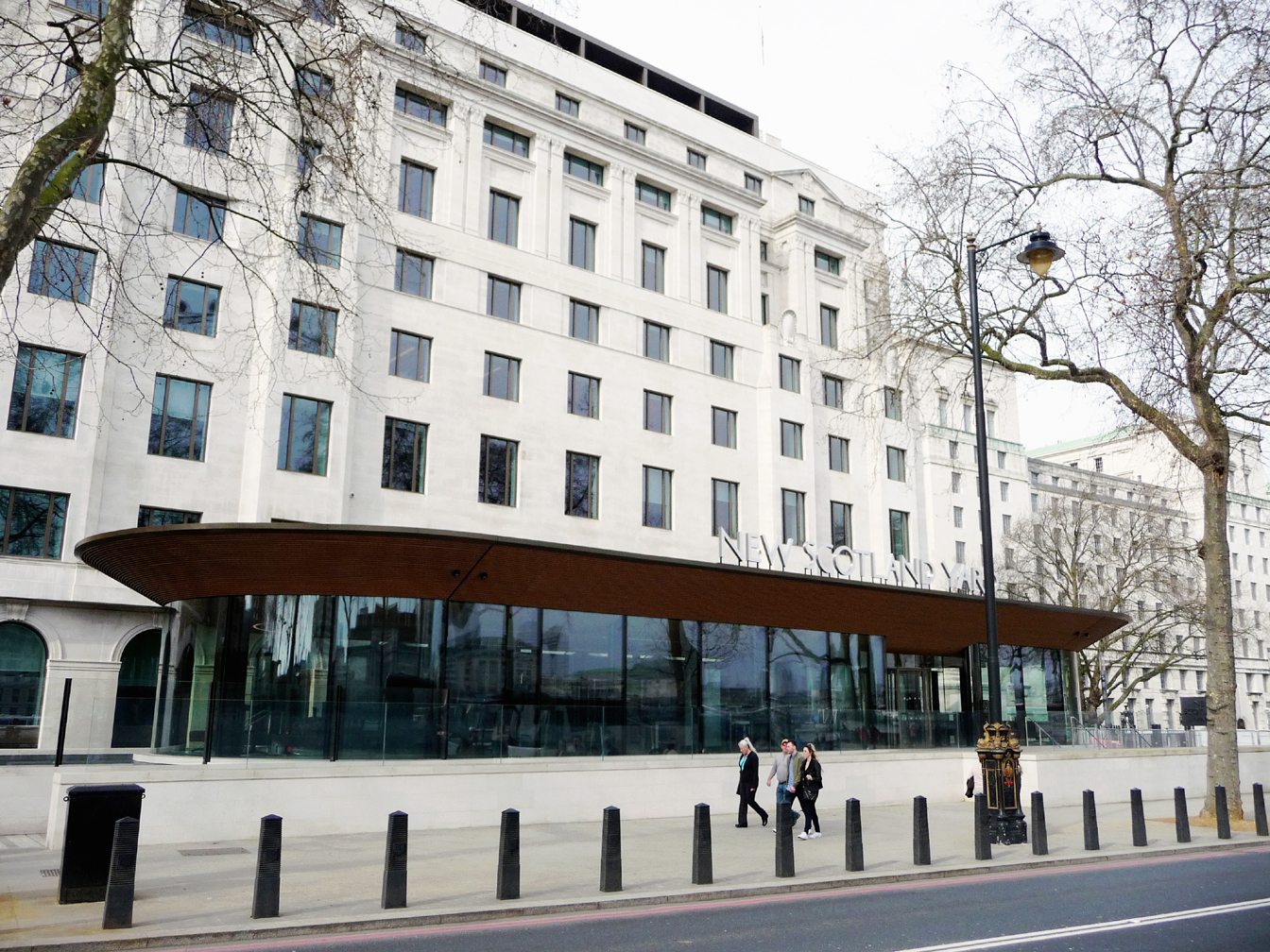
- Interactive map of the New Scotland Yard area

General information
- Architectural style: Stripped Classicism
- Location: Westminster, London, England
- Coordinates: 51°30′10″N 0°7′27″W
- Construction started: 1935
- Completed: 1940
- Owner: Metropolitan Police

Technical details
- Floor area: 8,691 m^{2} (93,550 ft^{2})

Design and construction
- Architect: William Curtis Green

New Scotland Yard, formerly known as the Curtis Green Building and before that, Whitehall Police Station, is a building in Westminster in Central London. Since November 2016, it has been the Scotland Yard headquarters of the Metropolitan Police (MPS), the fourth such premises since the force's foundation in 1829. It is located on Victoria Embankment and is situated within the Whitehall Conservation Area. It neighbours the Norman Shaw and Ministry of Defence buildings, together with Richmond House and Portcullis House.

The New Scotland Yard building was designed in 1935 by the English architect William Curtis Green, who was commissioned to build an annexe to the existing Norman Shaw North building, which had been the Metropolitan Police's headquarters since 1890. Together with the Norman Shaw South building, the three sites were split off in 1967, with the Norman Shaw buildings being taken over by the British Government and the Curtis Green annexe being retained by the police. The earlier annexe, built at the rear of the Norman Shaw South building in 1898 by the Met's surveyor and principal architect, John Dixon Butler, was retained as a police station and used operationally until 1992.

In 2013, as a result of an estate reorganisation, the former "New Scotland Yard" on Broadway was sold and the force headquarters was relocated to the Curtis Green Building after extensive renovations. It was renamed New Scotland Yard in 2016.

== History ==
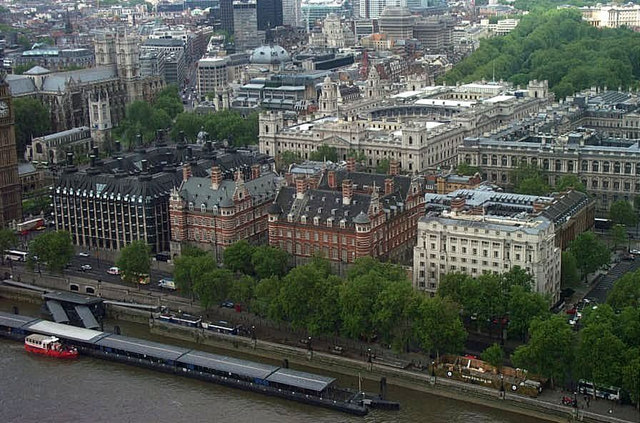
The four buildings at the front are: New Scotland Yard, to the right, the Norman Shaw Buildings (centre) and Portcullis House, to the left, on Victoria Embankment.

The stone-fronted, stripped classical building was designed by the English architect William Curtis Green. Construction started in 1935 and finished five years later. The building was constructed as a third building and an extension to the then–New Scotland Yard building, which consisted of two buildings that had been completed in 1890 and 1906, which were connected by a bridge. The two structures are now known as the Norman Shaw Buildings. The earlier annexe, built at the rear of the Norman Shaw South building in 1898 by the Met's surveyor and principal architect John Dixon Butler, was retained as a police station and used operationally until 1992.

The Curtis Green Building served as part of the Met's three-building headquarters during the Second World War and housed the forensics and technology departments. In 1967, the force relocated its main headquarters to 10 Broadway and sold the two Norman Shaw buildings to the British Government. The Curtis Green Building, however, remained a police building and became a sub-HQ for the force's territorial department until 2010. Before its 2015–2016 refurbishment, the building's dimensions were 8,691 m^{2} (93,550 ft^{2}), with a total capable capacity of 10,000 m^{2} (110,000 ft^{2}).

In 2013 it was announced by the Met that its headquarters would be relocated from 10 Broadway to the Curtis Green Building as part of the force's drive to reduce costs. The building was redesigned and extended in a multi-million pound redevelopment during 2015–2016. It was renamed "New Scotland Yard". The refurbishment contract was awarded to Allford Hall Monaghan Morris and the project was engineered by Arup and the project's costs were managed by Arcadis; construction responsibilities were undertaken by the Royal BAM Group. The MPS retained the "New Scotland Yard" revolving sign and moved it, along with the Crime Museum, to the new site.

== Sources ==
- Bradley, Simon; Pevsner, Nikolaus (2003). London 6: Westminster. The Buildings of England. London and New Haven: Yale University Press. ISBN 978-0-300-09595-1.
