= Winchmore Hill Police Station =

Police station in Enfield, London, England

Coordinates: 51°37′48.15″N 0°5′50.78″W

Winchmore Hill Police Station in 2026

Winchmore Hill Police Station is a former police station, designed by John Dixon Butler in 1915. It is located at 687 Green Lanes in Winchmore Hill, London. It is a grade II listed building with Historic England.

== History ==
The station closed in 2013 and was sold in 2015 for £950,000.
