= Norman Shaw Buildings =

Pair of buildings in Westminster, London

Coordinates: 51.5020°N 0.1246°W

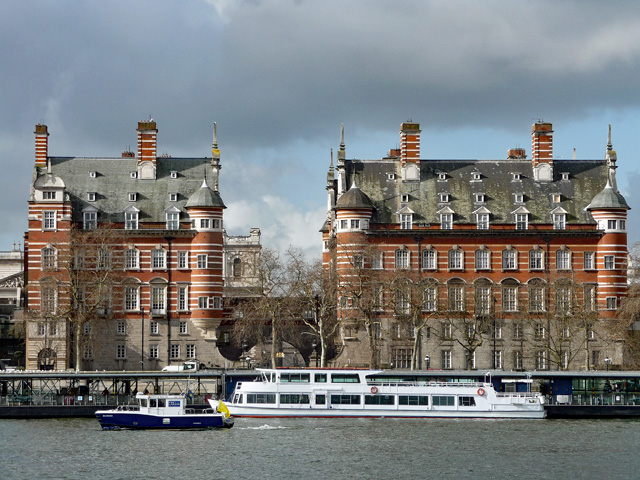
Norman Shaw North (right) and South (left) Buildings

The Norman Shaw Buildings (formerly known as New Scotland Yard) are a pair of buildings in Westminster, London, overlooking the River Thames. The buildings were designed by the architects Richard Norman Shaw and John Dixon Butler, between 1887 and 1906. They were originally the location of New Scotland Yard (the headquarters of the Metropolitan Police) between 1890 and 1967, but since 1979 have been used as parliamentary offices and have been named Norman Shaw North and South Buildings, augmenting limited space in the Palace of Westminster.

== Architecture ==
The buildings are in banded red brick and white portland stone on a granite base in the Victorian Romanesque style, and are located upon Victoria Embankment, between Portcullis House – to the south – and New Scotland Yard, to the north.

=== North Building ===
The North Building is Grade I listed. Shaw was assisted in the design by the Metropolitan Police Surveyor, John Butler. Shaw was the personal choice of the Home Secretary, Henry Matthews. It was built on land reclaimed from the River Thames by the building of the Victoria Embankment and which was previously allocated to a new opera house which was already partly built.

The cost was around £120,000. In 1888, during the construction of New Scotland Yard, workers discovered the dismembered torso of a female; the case, known as the "Whitehall Mystery", has never been solved. Opened in 1890, the building was soon found inadequate for the growing police force and an extension was required.

=== South Building ===
The South Building, now Grade II* listed, built from 1902 to 1906, was originally called Scotland House. Its elevations were designed by Shaw; Shaw was assisted by the Metropolitan Police's Architect and Surveyor, John Dixon Butler. It was linked to the original north building by a bridge over the then public road. Iron gates by Reginald Blomfield were erected. They are now Grade II* listed. In 1919, the Directorate of Intelligence was founded in this building.

== Refurbishment by the House of Commons ==
The north building was refurbished between 1973 and 1975, at a cost of £3.25 million, with the external walls being cleaned and the interior being refitted with offices for 128 MPs and their secretaries, dormitories (converted to offices in 2002), television studios, a library and the House of Commons Print Room. False ceilings were erected to conserve heat and improve lighting and carpets were laid.

In 2000, a walkway to the Palace of Westminster via Portcullis House was created, to reduce the time for members to reach the chamber for divisions (voting). The south building was refurbished between 1976 and 1979 with offices for 56 MPs, a gymnasium (later moved to another building) and a flat for the Clerk of the House. No false ceilings or carpeting were fitted, nor was any exterior cleaning carried out. A further refurbishment of the interior and exterior and roof was done between 2001 and 2003.

In December 2016, the firm WSP Parsons Brinckerhoff was awarded a contract to manage a major refurbishment project for various Parliamentary Estate buildings (both Norman Shaw buildings, 1 Derby Gate, and 1 Parliament Street). The project is expected to be complete in the early 2020s.

== Offices of the Leader of the Opposition ==
The offices of the Leader of the Opposition have been located in a suite in the Norman Shaw Buildings since the time of Michael Howard. In addition to Howard, David Cameron, Ed Miliband, Jeremy Corbyn, Keir Starmer and Kemi Badenoch have kept their offices in the building during their tenures as opposition leader.

== See also ==
- Albion House – former White Star Line headquarters in Liverpool, designed by Shaw in a similar style to the Norman Shaw Buildings.

== Sources ==
- Saint, Andrew (2010). Richard Norman Shaw. New Haven, US and London: Yale University Press. ISBN 9-780300-15526-6.
