= Magistrates' court (England and Wales) =

Lower court in England and Wales

In England and Wales, a magistrates' court (Welsh: llys ynadon) is a lower court which hears matters relating to summary offences and some triable either-way matters. Some civil law issues are also decided here; while family proceedings used to be dealt with in magistrates' courts, they are now dealt with in the Family Court (where magistrates still sit). In 2010 there were 320 magistrates' courts in England and Wales; by 2020, a decade later, 164 of those had closed. The jurisdiction of magistrates' courts and rules governing them are set out in the Magistrates' Courts Act 1980.

All criminal proceedings start at a magistrates' court. Summary offences are lesser crimes (for example, public order offences and most driving matters) that can be punished under the magistrates' courts maximum sentencing powers of 12 months' imprisonment, and/or an unlimited fine. Indictable only offences, on the other hand, are serious crimes (e.g. rape, murder); if it is found at the initial hearing of the magistrates' court that there is a case to answer, they are committed to the Crown Court, which has a much wider range of sentencing power. Either-way offences are matters that can be dealt with either in the magistrates' court or in the Crown Court. Defendants have the option to elect for their case to be heard in the Crown Court, but magistrates also have the right to send the case to the Crown Court if at any time they consider that their sentencing powers are likely to be insufficient.

In the magistrates' court, cases are usually heard by a bench of three (or occasionally two) justices of the peace, or by a district judge (magistrates' court). Criminal cases are usually, although not exclusively, investigated by the police and then prosecuted at the court by the Crown Prosecution Service. Some uncontested minor criminal matters (for example, road traffic offences, TV licensing matters etc.) can be dealt with by a single justice of the peace under the single justice procedure. In the criminal court, individual magistrates have equal sentencing powers to district judges and deliver verdicts on both "summary" and "either way" offences that carry up to twelve months in prison, or an unlimited fine.

Defendants may hire a solicitor or barrister to represent them, often paid for by legal aid.

There are magistrates in other common-law jurisdictions.

== History ==
The current magistrates' courts are a continuation of the system of courts of petty session. Magistrates also previously presided in quarter sessions, but the abolition of these in 1972 removed the need for the distinction.

In London the Middlesex Justices Act 1792 (32 Geo. 3. c. 53) created a separate system of courts presided over by magistrates, staffed with constables – based on the Bow Street Runners. These became known as police courts.

== Jurisdiction and sentencing powers ==
In criminal matters, magistrates' courts (formerly known as police courts in London, and petty sessions elsewhere) in England and Wales have been organised to deal with minor offences in a speedy manner. All criminal cases start in the magistrates' court and more than 95 per cent of them will end there – only the most serious offences go to Crown Court.

Summary offences are the least serious criminal offences. They include driving offences, vandalism, criminal damage of low value, low-level violent offences and being drunk and disorderly. This kind of "lesser" criminality will be dealt with in summary proceedings at a magistrates' court, where the defendant is tried, and if convicted is sentenced by, justices of the peace or a district judge (magistrates' court). No formal indictment is necessary.

The maximum sentencing powers of magistrates' courts are 12 months' imprisonment and/or an unlimited fine. Some driving offences are punished by endorsement (licence points) and/or disqualification from driving for a period of time.

There are four types of sentence available to the magistrates – a discharge (either conditional or absolute); a financial penalty; a community order, which must include at least one of twelve possible conditions (such as supervision, unpaid work, curfew, treatment programmes for issues such as domestic violence or sexual offending, drug and alcohol rehabilitation, etc.); or custody (either immediately or as a suspended sentence). The majority of sentences are non-custodial. For either-way offences, if the magistrates feel that their powers of sentencing are insufficient, they can send the case to the Crown Court, who can impose a more severe sentence.

Often the point is to achieve restorative justice (compensation of victims of crime) and reformation of the offenders. These alternative punishments are called community sentences. A community sentence usually includes "community payback", which is a requirement to carry out between 40 and 300 hours of unpaid community service. This is often complemented by some kind of programme or treatment, offering a helping hand to offenders, and engaging them at the same time – ending a drug habit, coping with a mental illness, skills and qualifications for work, and more. Also, the judge (or magistrate) may issue orders with rules such as curfew, restraining orders (cannot go near their victim, for example) and many others. During serving of community sentences, similarly to suspended sentence, offenders usually will be supervised by a probation officer.

Either way offences can be dealt with either by the magistrates' court or in the Crown Court. There will be a hearing to decide on venue, where there will be an outline of the case from both prosecution and defence. The guideline is whether, taking the prosecution case at its most serious, the court believes that a magistrates' court has sufficient powers of sentence. If so, the case will be accepted. The defendant then has the option of whether to consent to summary trial or elect for trial before a judge and jury. If both the court and the defendant agree, a date will be held for a subsequent hearing in a magistrates' court – otherwise the case will be sent to the Crown Court, as with Indictable offences below.

Indictable only offences are the most serious crimes, including murder, manslaughter, rape, robbery, or causing death by dangerous driving. These must be sent to the Crown Court. For all cases, excluding murder, the magistrates will decide whether the defendant is to be released on bail or remanded into custody. In law in England and Wales, unconditional bail is automatically granted unless the court believes there is a chance the defendant will either abscond, reoffend during the bail period, or interfere with witnesses or the case in general.

Juvenile justice deals with criminal offences by young people, who have reached the age of criminal liability (ten years old), but are not yet adults (have not reached 18). These cases are heard by specially trained magistrates sitting in a youth court. They have the power to impose a sentence of youth detention known as a detention and training order (DTO) for a period of up to two years.

Some civil matters, including non-payment of council tax, are heard by magistrates.

== Judges and other roles ==
Modern magistrates' courts are based on a centuries-old office of the justice of the peace, so named for their responsibility for guarding the Queen's or King's peace.

=== Magistrates ===
Justices of the peace (JPs), more commonly referred to as magistrates, are trained volunteers appointed from the local community; the nature of their role means that it is not necessary for them to be legally qualified, but they do have the assistance of a legally-qualified adviser in court. JPs require intelligence, common sense, integrity, and the capacity to act fairly. They are selected by a local advisory committee and recommended to the Lord Chancellor for appointment only if they are of good character and can demonstrate the five key qualities required of a judicial office holder, these are: (a) maturity and a sense of fairness, (b) commitment and reliability, (c) social awareness, (d) logical thinking, and (e) understanding and communication. Membership is widely spread throughout the area covered and drawn from all walks of life. Police officers, traffic wardens, as well as their close relatives will not be appointed, nor will those convicted of certain criminal offences including recent minor offences.

All new justices of the peace undergo comprehensive training before sitting. There is a mentoring program to help guide new appointees. Mentors are magistrates with at least three years' service. The training, delivered by the Judicial College, covers the necessary law and procedure required for their role. They continue to receive training throughout their judicial career, and are appraised every four years, every two years for a Presiding Justice, to check that they continue to remain competent in their role. Additional training is given to justices choosing to sit in the Youth Court or those dealing with family matters. New JPs sit with mentors on at least six occasions during their first eighteen months.

Justices of the peace are unpaid appointees, but they may receive allowances to cover traveling expenses, subsistence and loss of earnings for those not paid by their employer while sitting as a magistrate, up to £116.78 a day. A justice of the peace may sit at any magistrates' court in England and Wales, but in practice, they are appointed to their local bench, a colloquial and legal term for the local court. Justices of the peace will normally sit as a panel of three, with two as a minimum in most cases, except those cases dealt with under the single justice procedure. Many are members of the Magistrates' Association, which provides advice and training and represents magistrates.

The lead magistrate, known as the presiding justice (PJ), should be addressed in court as "Sir" or "Madam" or "Your worship", and the magistrates collectively as "Your worships". In writing, they are referred to as "John Smith, JP", for justice of the peace. The other magistrates are known as "wingers". All three magistrates contribute equally to the decision-making, and carry equal authority, but the presiding justice will speak on their behalf in open court.

The magistracy is an ancient institution, dating in England from at least 1327. The role is underpinned by the principles of "local justice" and "justice by one's peers".

=== District judge ===
District judges (magistrates' courts), formerly known as stipendiary magistrates, are paid judges, employed by the Ministry of Justice. They sit alone and have the same authority as a fully-constituted bench of magistrates. District judges will often hear cases where there is complex legal argument and where a ruling may be required regarding the law. A minimum of five years' legal experience is required for those seeking appointment. They are distinct from the County Court district judges.

District judges (MC) are referred to as "District Judge" or "DJ" in court, addressed customarily "Judge" and addressed in correspondence with, for example, "District Judge (Magistrates' Courts) Tuff".

The senior district judge is responsible for leadership of the 300 district judges sitting in magistrates' courts in England and Wales. The senior district judge holds the title chief magistrate, but has no responsibility for justices of the peace. The chief magistrate is also responsible for hearing the most sensitive or complex cases.

=== Legal adviser ===
Magistrates are assisted in court by a legal adviser who is a qualified solicitor or barrister who will ensure that the court is properly directed regarding the law. They will see that the court's business is dealt with efficiently, and will keep a full and accurate record of the proceedings.

=== Prosecutor ===
The Crown Prosecution Service (CPS) is an authority responsible for prosecuting cases (traditionally, in the name of the queen or the king), once the police have completed their investigation. A relative novelty in English criminal proceedings, the CPS was established by the Prosecution of Offences Act 1985. Since its creation in 1986, it is the principal, though not the only, body that can bring a case to a criminal court in England and Wales.

A minority of cases are prosecuted by other law enforcement agencies, such as English local authorities, Welsh local authorities, the Department for Work and Pensions or the Health and Safety Executive, or private prosecutors such as the RSPCA or the BBC in its capacity as the TV licensing authority. Private individuals are also entitled to bring a private prosecution – this happens most commonly where an individual is an alleged victim of common assault and the authorities have declined to prosecute. Private prosecutors can either represent themselves, or they may instruct a solicitor or barrister to represent them.

The CPS retains a power to take over a private prosecution, under section 6(2) of the Prosecution of Offences Act 1985, either to continue or discontinue it. It is, however, CPS policy to exercise this power only if the prosecution should be stopped because it does not meet the requirements of the Code for Crown Prosecutors, or there are important reasons why the prosecution should be pursued by the CPS.

=== Defence ===
Defendants may choose to represent themselves, and usually do so in minor cases such as road traffic offences. However, defendants may be represented by a solicitor or a barrister. In most magistrates' courts there will be a duty solicitor available to advise and possibly to represent any defendant who does not have their own solicitor.

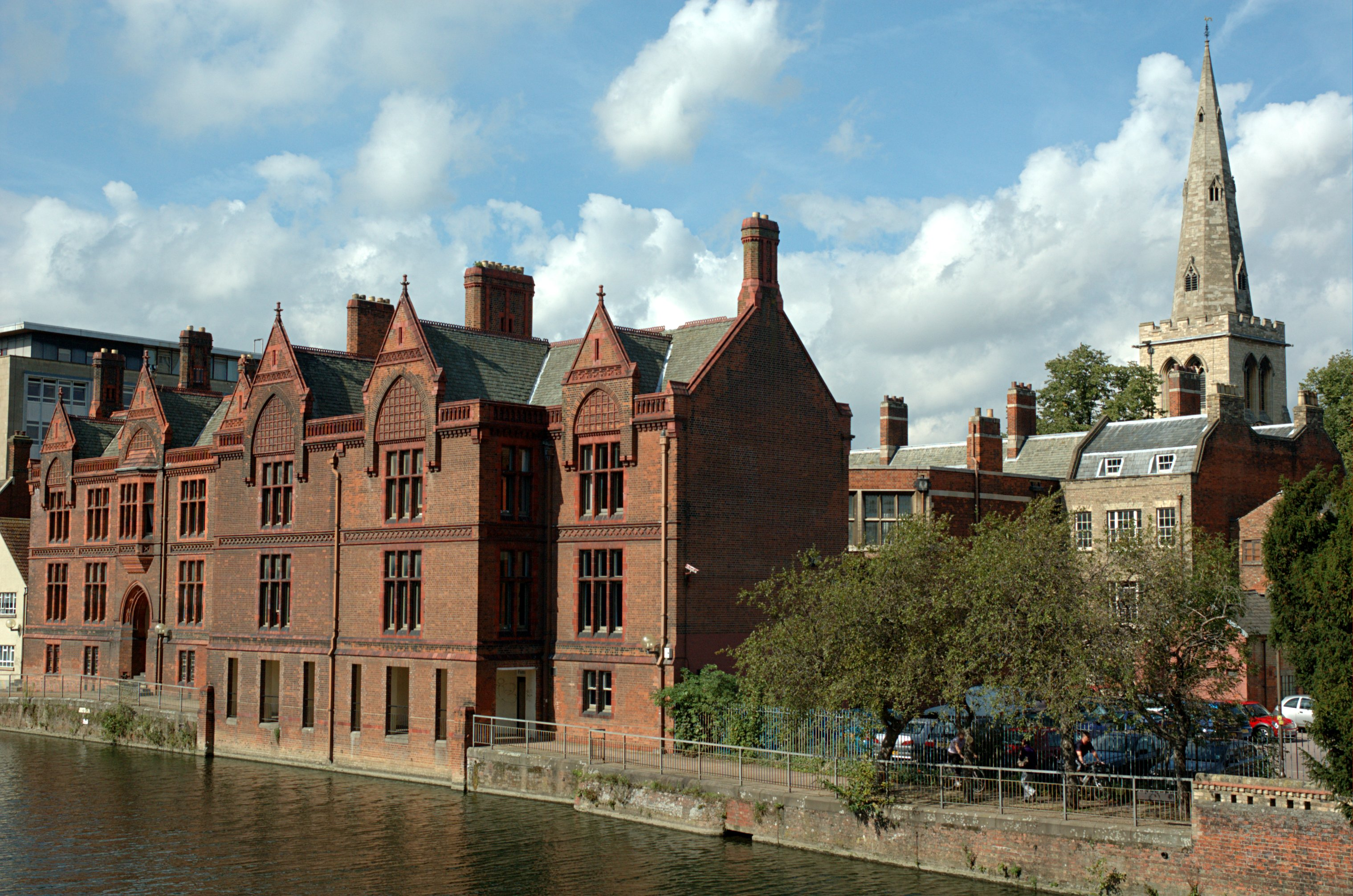
Bedford Magistrates' Court

== Proceedings ==
Proceedings in magistrates' courts are oral and open to the public – exceptions exist for the protection of victims (e.g. rape cases) and in youth courts.

=== Commencement of proceedings ===
When defendants first appear before a magistrates' court, they will do so in one of three circumstances. They will either appear on bail having been charged with an offence and compelled to attend court under penalty; in response to a summons or requisition, which requires attendance but does not, in the first instance, carry any penalty for non-attendance; or in custody, having been refused bail by the police. Defendants on bail must first surrender to the custody of the court, which they will normally do by entering the dock.

Whichever the circumstance, the first requirement is for defendants to identify themselves to the court. Once the court is satisfied as to the identity, it must consider the charges.

=== Summary proceedings ===
If the charge is a summary offence, the court will generally expect a plea to be taken. If the plea is one of "not guilty", the court will fix a date for trial, taking into account the number and availability of the witnesses.

In the event of a plea of guilty, the court will hear the facts of the case from the prosecution and mitigation from the defence, then consider sentence. For the most minor offences where the appropriate sentence is a fine or discharge, this will usually follow immediately after a plea of guilty. However, where the offence is more serious and may justify a community-based penalty or imprisonment, the case will usually be adjourned for the probation service to interview the defendant and prepare a pre-sentence report in which a recommendation as to the most appropriate sentence will be made. When the defendant returns to court for sentence, the bench will consider the report along with any mitigation put forward by the defendant before passing sentence.

On each occasion that a defendant appears before the court, the issue of bail must be addressed. Defendants may be released on bail, which is an order of the court compelling a defendant's future attendance, which may have conditions attached to it where such conditions are considered necessary either to ensure the defendant's future attendance, prevent the commission of further offences, or prevent the obstruction of justice. If the court decides that no conditions exist which could achieve these objectives, the court may remand the defendant in custody until the next hearing.

=== Either-way offences ===
When an either-way offence is charged at the Magistrates' court, magistrates are responsible for deciding whether to send it to the Crown Court.

If the charge is an either-way offence, the "allocation" procedure is carried out. In this procedure, defendants must indicate what plea to the charge would be. If the defendant indicates a plea of "not guilty", or declines to indicate a plea, the court hears an outline of the facts from the prosecution and representations from the defendant or their representative, and then determines whether the case is suitable for summary trial or not. The court will decline jurisdiction to try the case if it decides that the sentencing powers of the magistrates' court are likely to be inadequate to deal with the case, or if the case is particularly complex. If the court accepts jurisdiction, the defendant will then be offered the option to have the case dealt with at Crown Court.

If the defendant indicates a plea of guilty, the magistrates may proceed to sentence the defendant, either immediately or after receipt of a pre-sentence report from HMPPS, or commit them to the Crown Court for sentence there.

==== Special cases ====
On charges of shoplifting where the value of the case does not exceed £200, the magistrates do not have the right to refuse jurisdiction, but the defendant has the right to elect for Crown Court trial.

On charges of certain offences including domestic burglary and drug trafficking where the defendant has two or more previous convictions for the same offence, domestic burglary with threats of violence, as well as certain firearms charges, the case must be sent to the Crown Court.

=== Committal and indictment ===
The grand jury system, which still exists in the United States, has been abolished in England and Wales. Instead, magistrates now perform the grand jury's functions of indicting those accused of offences which need to be tried by a jury and sending them to the Crown Court for trial.

In the case of offences which are indictable only, no plea is taken and the case is sent forthwith to the Crown Court.

== Challenges to decisions of magistrates' courts ==
There are four mechanisms under which a decision of a magistrates' court may be challenged:

- reconsideration by the same magistrates' court;
- appeal to the Crown Court;
- appeal to the High Court (King's Bench Division) by way of case stated; and
- judicial review in the High Court (Administrative Division).

=== Reconsideration by the same magistrates' court ===
If the defendant thinks that the decision was wrong they can ask the court to reconsider the sentence or conviction. This may be because the defendant thinks that there was a serious error in law, or that the court did not follow the right steps. If a defendant did not know about their case before a decision was made then they can make a statutory declaration before the magistrates' court. If accepted, the magistrates may agree to start the proceedings again and set aside the original judgement. If a defendant disagrees with the decision made by the Magistrates' court then they would need to appeal to the Crown Court.

=== Appeal to the Crown Court ===
The procedure for appeals to the Crown Court is governed by the Criminal Procedure Rules (CrimPR) Part 34. A defendant can appeal to the Crown Court against conviction or sentence. If the appeal is against conviction then the hearing is de novo, that is, it is a complete rehearing of the original trial. The Crown Court panel will normally consist of a judge (either a judge of the High Court, a circuit judge, a Recorder, or a qualifying judge advocate), and a minimum of two justices of the peace (magistrates), of whom all must have been previously uninvolved in the decision under appeal. The judge will preside over the proceedings and direct the Court as to the relevant law, but all panel members have an equal say regarding the final decision or verdict. If the panel cannot all agree on the verdict and/or sentence, then a majority decision prevails.

=== Appeal to the High Court by way of case stated ===
If the defendant or the prosecution believe that the magistrates or district judge, or the Crown Court on appeal, made an error in law, then they can appeal to the High Court by case stated. This is governed by the Criminal Procedure Rules (CrimPR) Part 35. The magistrates' court or the Crown Court will be asked to state a case to the High Court, i.e. they will be asked to provide a written summary of the case which can then be challenged by the aggrieved party. Upon considering the matter, the High Court may reverse, affirm, or amend the determination in respect of the case that has been stated. It may also remit the matter back to the magistrates' court or the Crown Court with advice to be considered.

=== Judicial review in the High Court (Administrative division) ===
Judicial review may be considered if a party believes that a court has acted in excess of its jurisdiction, that there has been a breach of natural justice, or if a decision or reasoning is Wednesbury unreasonable, i.e. it is irrational. Other circumstances may also apply, but typically in a judicial review a challenge is being made to the lawfulness of a decision or action made by a public body.

== See also ==
- List of courts in England and Wales
- Local justice area
- Petty session
  - Petty sessional division
- Family proceedings court
- Bench trial, a trial where a judge or a bench of magistrates makes decisions based on evidence presented to the court.
- Justice of the peace court (Scottish equivalent of a Magistrates' Court)
