= Scotland Yard =

Headquarters of the Metropolitan Police Service, Westminster, Greater London

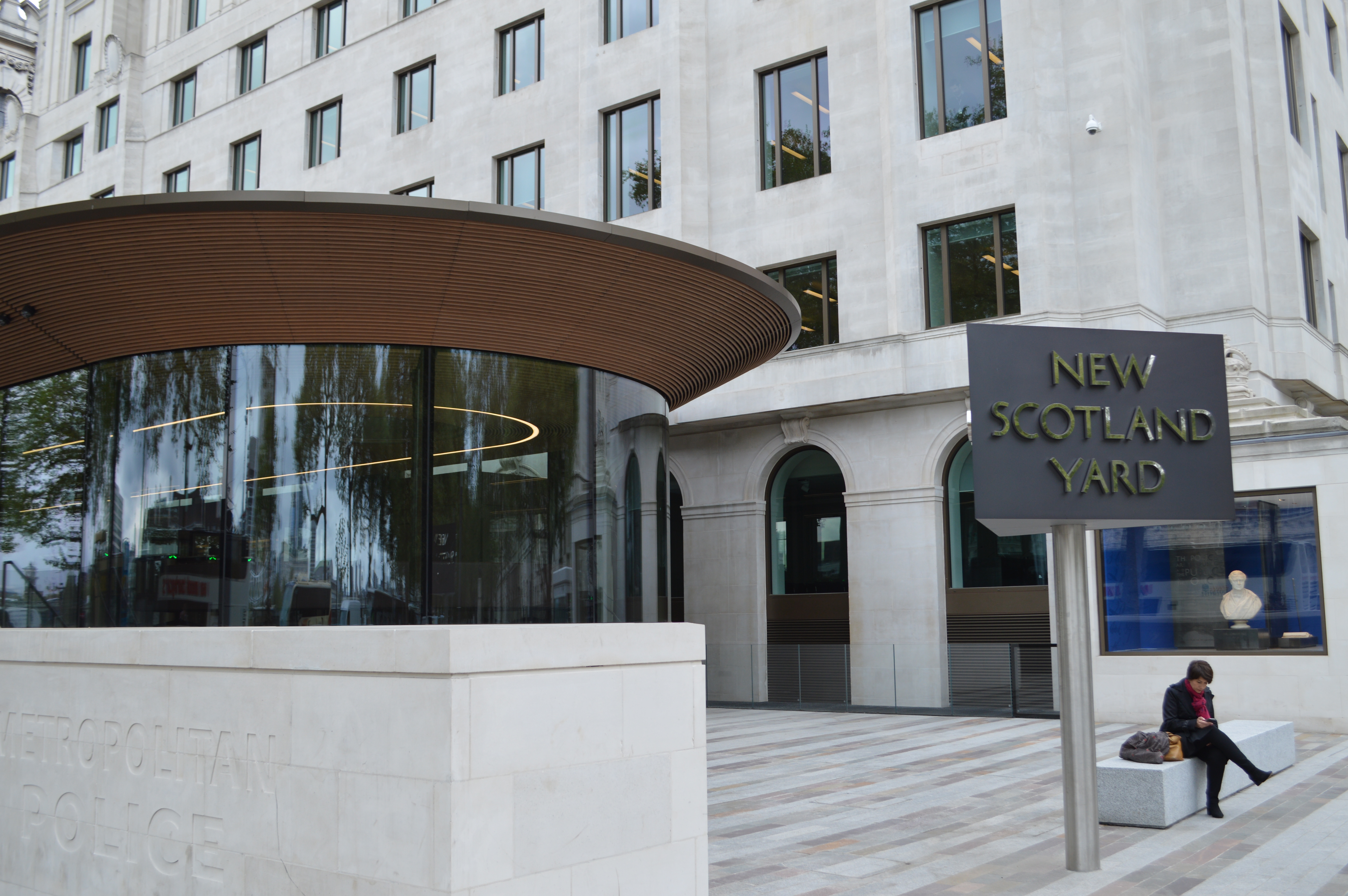
- The iconic sign outside New Scotland Yard came to prominence when it was first located outside an earlier New Scotland Yard.
- Alternative names: New Scotland Yard

General information
- Location: 1829–1890: 4 Whitehall Place, St James's, City of Westminster (with a public entrance in Great Scotland Yard); 1890–1967: Norman Shaw Buildings, Victoria Embankment, City of Westminster; 1967–2016: 8–10 Broadway, City of Westminster; 2016–present: New Scotland Yard, Victoria Embankment, City of Westminster, Greater London, United Kingdom
- Coordinates: 51°30′10″N 0°7′27″W

Scotland Yard (officially New Scotland Yard) is the headquarters of the Metropolitan Police, the territorial police force responsible for policing Greater London's 32 boroughs, and several additional authorities throughout the United Kingdom. Its name derives from the location of the original Metropolitan Police headquarters at 4 Whitehall Place, which had its main public entrance on the Westminster street called Great Scotland Yard. The Scotland Yard entrance became the public entrance, and over time "Scotland Yard" came to be used not only as the common name of the headquarters building, but also as a metonym for the Metropolitan Police Service (MPS) itself and police officers, especially detectives, who serve in it. The New York Times wrote in 1964 that, just as Wall Street gave its name to New York's financial district, Scotland Yard became the name for police activity in London.

The force moved from Great Scotland Yard in 1890 to a newly completed building on the Victoria Embankment, and the name "New Scotland Yard" was adopted for the new headquarters. An adjacent building was completed in 1906, and a third building (the Curtis Green Building) was added in 1940. In 1967 the MPS consolidated its headquarters from the three-building complex to a tall, newly constructed "New Scotland Yard" building on Broadway in nearby Victoria. In 2013, it was announced that the force would move again, back to the Curtis Green Building on Westminster's Victoria Embankment. The move was completed in 2016, and following tradition the building was renamed "New Scotland Yard".

== History ==
The Metropolitan Police Service is responsible for law enforcement within Greater London, excluding the square mile of the City of London, which is covered by the City of London Police, and also excluding the London Underground and National Rail networks, which are the responsibility of the British Transport Police.

=== 4 Whitehall Place ===
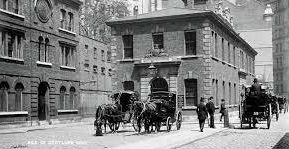
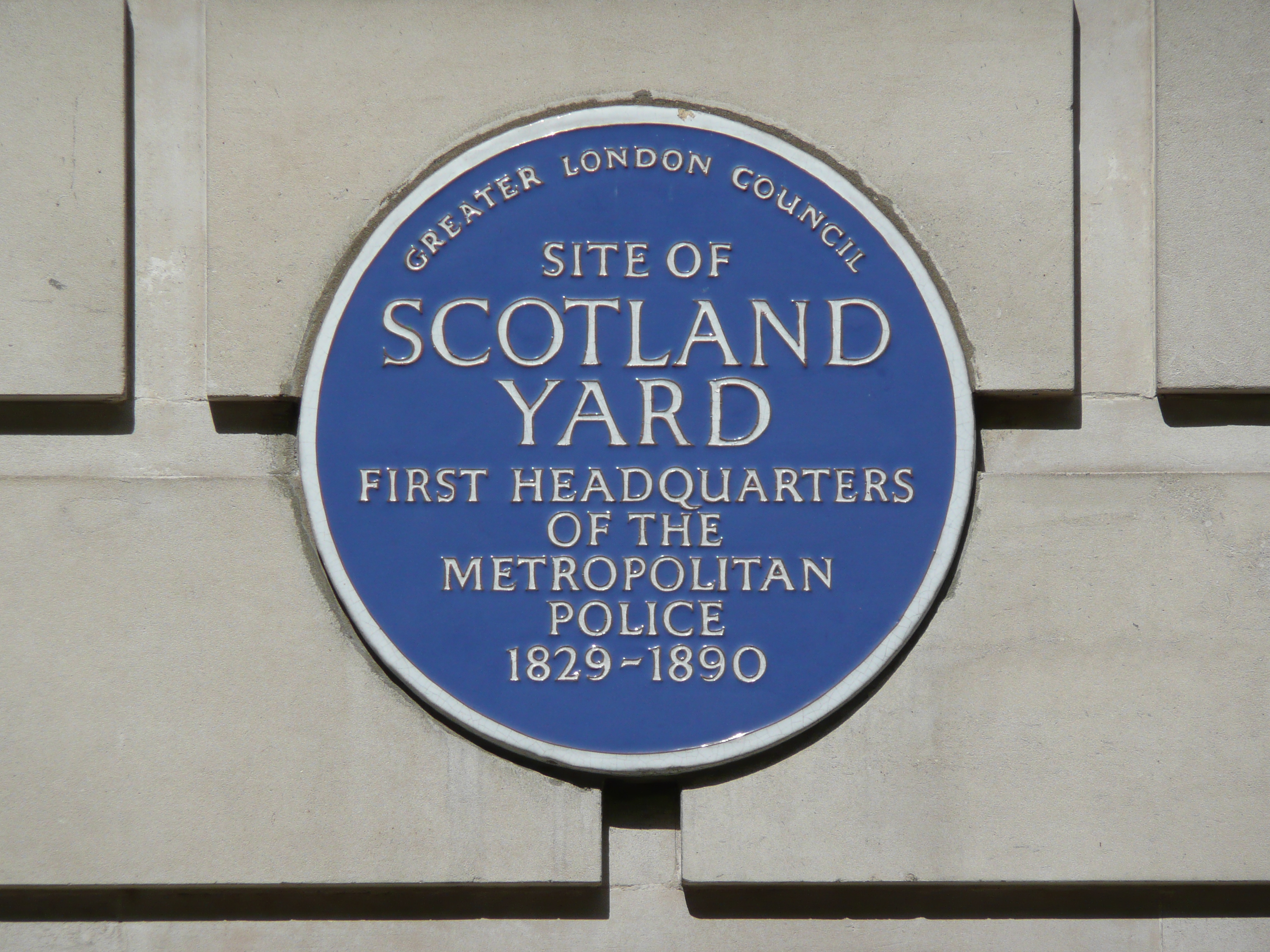
8 and 9 Great Scotland Yard (far left, with clock), next to the Public Carriage Office (right) at 4 Whitehall Place, Westminster, London, and right, a commemorative blue plaque on the building now on the site of 4 Whitehall Place

The Metropolitan Police was formed by Robert Peel with the implementation of the Metropolitan Police Act, passed by Parliament in 1829. Peel, with the help of Eugène-François Vidocq, selected the original site on Whitehall Place for the new police headquarters. The first two commissioners, Charles Rowan and Richard Mayne, along with various police officers and staff, occupied the building. Previously a private house, 4 Whitehall Place (51.50598°N 0.12609°W) backed onto a street called Great Scotland Yard. The building now on the site of 4 Whitehall Place (the 1950s rear extension to the Ministry of Agriculture, Fisheries and Food) still has a rear entrance on Great Scotland Yard.

By 1887, the Metropolitan Police headquarters had expanded from 4 Whitehall Place into several neighbouring addresses, including 3, 5, 21 and 22 Whitehall Place and several stables, including one at 7 Great Scotland Yard still in use by the mounted branch. These also included buildings which fronted onto the north side of Great Scotland Yard, with the address of 8 and 9 Great Scotland Yard, sometimes shown on maps as a station or "police office" on A Division but actually used from 1842 as the central headquarters of the new Detective Branch. Those buildings were damaged in an 1884 Fenian bomb attack and are now lost under the former Central London Recruiting Office, which was acquired by hypermarkets operator Lulu Group International in 2015 and reopened as a Hyatt luxury hotel four years later.

=== Victoria Embankment ===
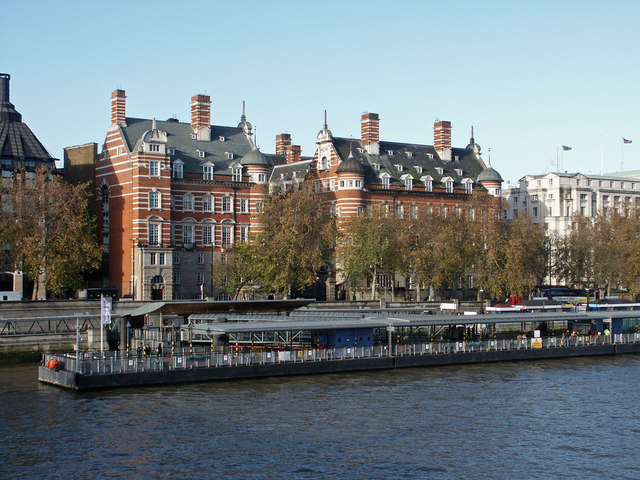
The "New" Scotland Yard (built 1890 and 1906), now called the Norman Shaw Buildings; at the far right is the Curtis Green Building (white), which became New Scotland Yard in November 2016

In the 1880s the force decided that it had outgrown its original site, and moved to a new headquarters designed by architect Richard Norman Shaw (51.50222°N 0.12463°W) on the Victoria Embankment, overlooking the River Thames, south of what is now the Ministry of Defence's headquarters. In 1888, during the construction of the new building, workers discovered the dismembered torso of a female; the case, known as the 'Whitehall Mystery', was never solved. In 1890, police headquarters moved to the new location, which was named New Scotland Yard. By this time, the Metropolitan Police had grown from its initial 1,000 officers to about 13,000 and needed more administrative staff and a bigger headquarters. Further increases in the size and responsibilities of the force required even more administrators and space. Therefore, new buildings were constructed and completed in 1906 and 1940, so that New Scotland Yard became a three-building complex. (51.50183°N 0.12446°W). The first two buildings are now a Grade I listed structure known as the Norman Shaw Buildings.

=== 10 Broadway ===
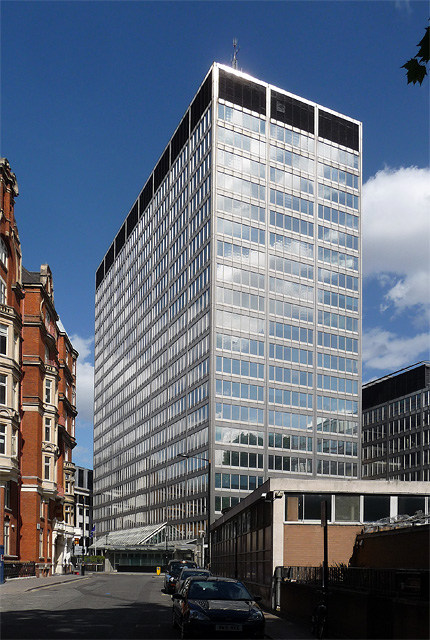
The former New Scotland Yard building in Victoria Street

The headquarters of the Metropolitan Police were moved to 8–10 Broadway in 1967, in a new building constructed on a site that also bordered onto Victoria Street.

In 2008, the Metropolitan Police Authority (MPA) bought the freehold of 10 Broadway for around £120 million.

10 Broadway was sold to the Abu Dhabi Financial Group in December 2014 for £370 million, and redevelopment plans for a six-building, mixed-use development were approved in February 2016. Ownership was officially passed from the MPA to the Abu Dhabi Financial Group when the relocation was completed on 31 October 2016; the building began demolition later that year.

=== Current location ===
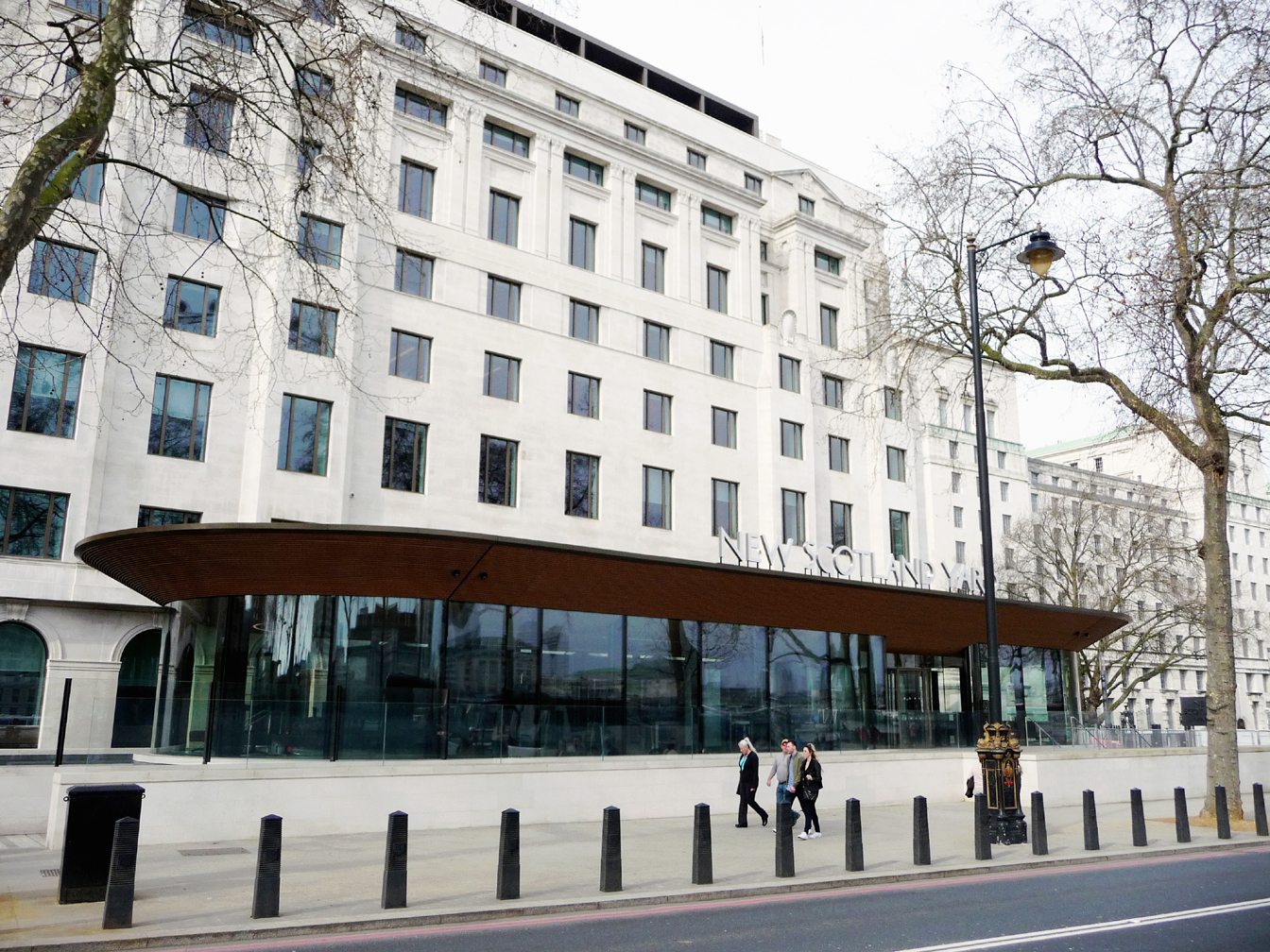
The current site of New Scotland Yard, formerly the Curtis Green Building

In May 2013, the Metropolitan Police confirmed that the New Scotland Yard building on Broadway would be sold and the force's headquarters would be moved back to the Curtis Green Building on the Victoria Embankment. A competition was announced for architects to redesign the building prior to the Metropolitan Police moving to it in 2015. This building previously housed the Territorial Policing headquarters and is adjacent to the original New Scotland Yard (Norman Shaw North Building).

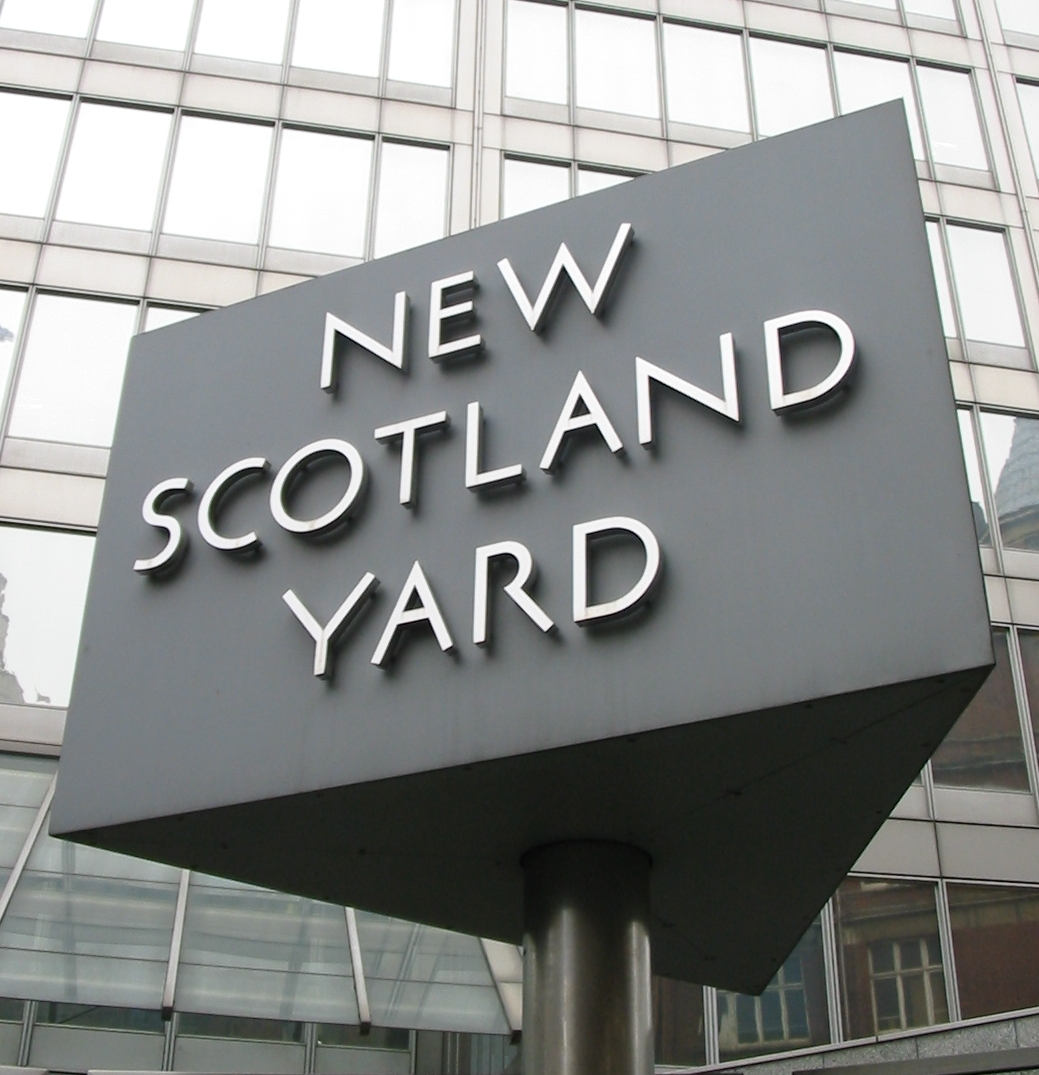
Rotating sign

In December 2015, construction work on the exterior of the Curtis Green building was completed. On 31 October 2016, the Metropolitan Police staff left the building at 10 Broadway and moved to their new headquarters. The new New Scotland Yard building was to have been opened by Queen Elizabeth II on 23 March 2017, but that same day it was announced that the Royal opening would be postponed, due to the preceding day's terrorist attack at Westminster. The opening was re-arranged for 13 July 2017. Like all three of its predecessors it houses the Met's Crime Museum (formerly known as the Black Museum), founded in 1874, a collection of criminal memorabilia not open to the public.

== In popular culture ==
Scotland Yard has appeared in books, films, and television since the Victorian era when it featured in the Jack the Ripper cases and the stories of Sherlock Holmes. Wilkie Collins's novel The Moonstone (1868), a tale of a Scotland Yard Detective investigating the theft of a valuable diamond, has been described as perhaps the earliest clear example of the police procedural genre. In Robert Louis Stevenson's gothic novella Strange Case of Dr Jekyll and Mr Hyde (1886), Inspector Newcomen, a Scotland Yard Detective, explores Hyde's loft in Soho and discovers evidence of his depraved life.

Alfred Hitchcock's 1929 thriller film Blackmail (widely considered the first British "talkie") features a Scotland Yard Detective Frank Webber (played by John Longden).

Scotland Yard appears in the 1972 episode of Columbo, "Dagger of the Mind". Columbo visits Scotland Yard to study the investigative techniques they use in London before becoming involved as a consultant for a murder case.

In Monty Python's 1969 comedy sketch "The Funniest Joke in the World", Graham Chapman plays a Scotland Yard Inspector who leaves the house with the joke in hand before dying from laughter.

Scotland Yard has also appeared in the Professor Layton series as supporting characters, which Layton helped them in solving many cases. Inspector Chelmey and Constable Barton are the most appearing of Scotland Yard's members.

A fictional version of New Scotland Yard appears in the film V for Vendetta and in the video game Watch Dogs: Legion, where it is depicted as an Albion-controlled site.

Jeffrey Archer's William Warwick series, starting with Nothing Ventured in 2019, follows William Warwick, the protagonist's rise from a detective constable to senior ranks within Scotland Yard.

== See also ==
- Whitehall 1212 – for many years, the main public telephone number of Scotland Yard
- List of law enforcement agencies in the United Kingdom, Crown Dependencies and British Overseas Territories
