= Andrew Saint =

English architectural historian (1946–2025)

insert a caption here

Andrew John Saint (30 November 1946 – 16 July 2025) was an English architectural historian.

Saint worked as the architectural editor of the Survey of London (1974–86) and as a historian for Historic England (then known as English Heritage) 1986–95, before being appointed Professor in the Department of Architecture, University of Cambridge from 1995 to 2006.

While General Editor of the Survey of London (2006–15), Saint co-authored volumes on Battersea, Woolwich, South East Marylebone, and Oxford Street. He was a prolific author of journal articles and books in his own right, including the edited volume ‘Politics and the People of London: London County Council, 1889–1965’.

Saint died on 16 July 2025, at the age of 78. His funeral was held, at his request, at St Michael's, Bedford Park, London, designed by Richard Norman Shaw.

== Selected publications ==
- Richard Norman Shaw. Yale University Press, New Haven, 1976. ISBN 0-300-01955-6
- The Image of the Architect. Yale University Press, New Haven, 1983. ISBN 0-300-03013-4
- Towards a Social Architecture: the role of school-building in post-war England. New Haven, London, 1987. ISBN 0-300-03830-5
- A Farewell to Fleet Street. English Heritage, 1988. (With Susie Barson) ISBN 0850319714
- Not Buildings but a Method of Building: the achievement of the post-war Hertfordshire school building programme. Hertfordshire Publications, Hertford, 1990. ISBN 0-901354-57-0
- London. Stationery Office Books, 1991. (With Elain Harwood) (Exploring England's Heritage series) ISBN 0-11-300032-4
- The Chronicles of London. Weidenfeld & Nicolson, London, 1994. (With Gillian Darley) ISBN 0-297-83234-4
- Architect and Engineer: a study in sibling rivalry. Yale University Press, New Haven, 2008. ISBN 978-0-300-12443-9
- Cragside. National Trust Guidebook, Swindon, multiple editions.
- Politics and the People of London: London County Council, 1889–1965 (editor) Bloomsbury, London, ISBN 978-1-85285-029-6
- Woolwich for The Survey of London, vol.48 (with Peter Guillery), London ISBN 978-0-300-18722-9
- Battersea for The Survey of London, Vol 49, Part 1 (with Colin Thom) London ISBN 978-0-300-19616-0
- Battersea for The Survey of London, Vol 50, Part 2 (with Colin Thom) London ISBN 978-0-300-19616-0
- Oxford Street for The Survey of London, vol. 53 Paul Mellon Centre, London, 2020
- St Giles in the Fields - History of a London Parish (with Rebecca Preston), London 2020
- London Suburbs (editor) London 2003 ISBN 1-85894-077-X
- St Paul's: The Cathedral Church of London, 604–2004 (joint editor) London, 2014 ISBN 0-300-09276-8
