= Power House, Chiswick =

Building in Hounslow, London, England

Coordinates: 51.4939°N 0.2495°W

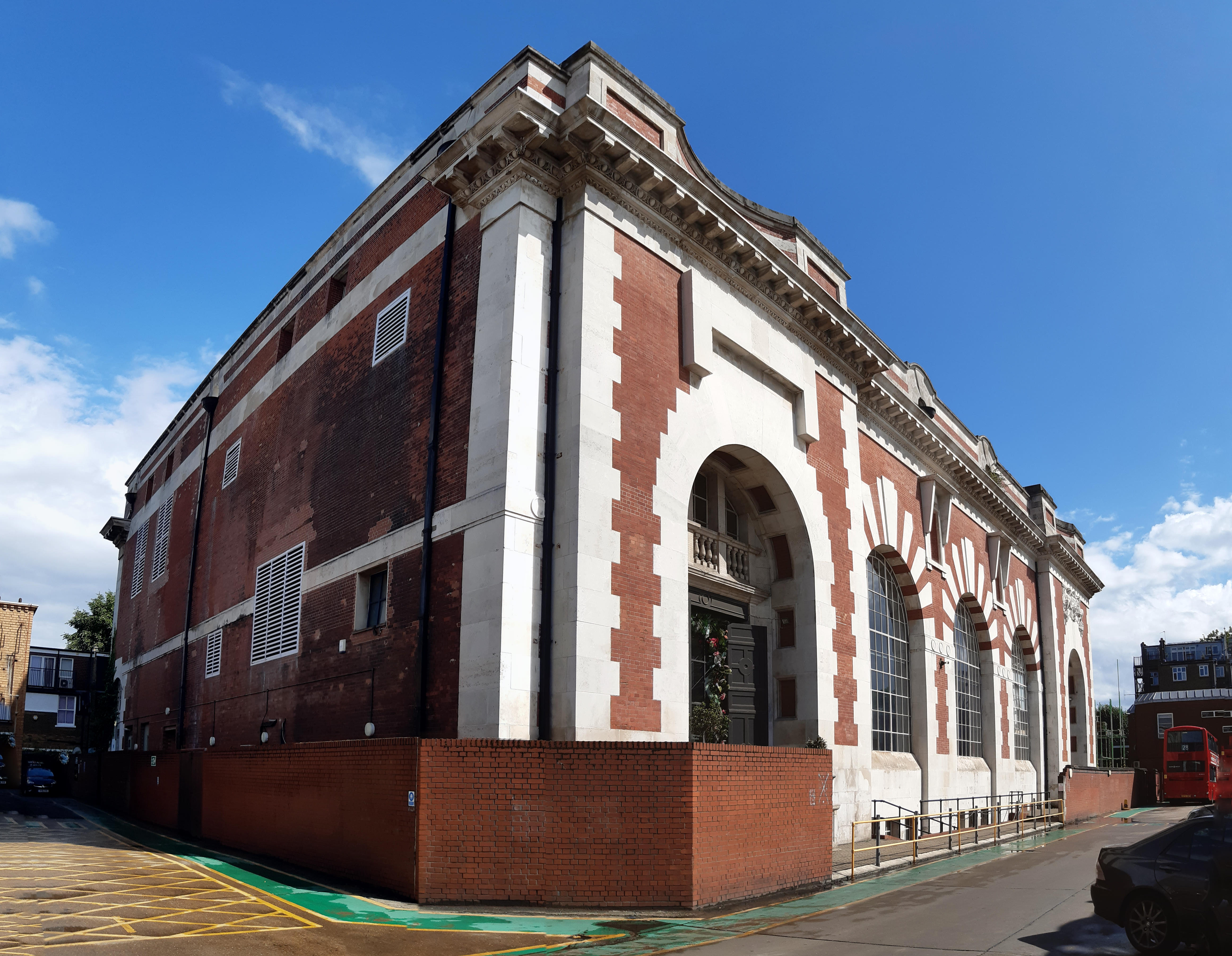
The Power House, Chiswick High Road from southwest corner

The Power House, Chiswick is a former electricity generating station on Chiswick High Road and a Grade II listed building, completed in 1901. It provided power for the London United Electrical Tramway Company until 1917. The upper part of the building was converted for residential use in 1985, and the lower part for use as a recording studio in 1989.

== Architecture ==
The Power House was built as an electricity generating station for the London United Electrical Tramway Company between 1899 and 1901.

The Power House was designed by the architects William Curtis Green and J. Clifton Robinson; the building engineer was a Mr. Parshall. It is described in Bridget Cherry and Nikolaus Pevsner's The Buildings of England as a "monumental free Baroque brick and stone composition". The building is rectangular, with five bays on one pair of faces, and three bays on the other pair. There is a large cornice with brackets above enormous arches which have long voussoirs in stone. The façade above the front entrance is adorned with two large carved female figures that represent 'Electricity' and 'Locomotion'. As built, it had a 260-foot high steel smoke-stack.

Cherry and Pevsner call the Power House "by far the most exciting building" of Chiswick High Road and Turnham Green, and "the best surviving example in London from the early, heroic era of generating stations whose bulky intrusion in residential areas was tempered by thoughtful architectural treatment".

== Usage ==
The building had a short working life as a generating station; in 1917 power generation was taken over by the generating station at Lots Road, Chelsea. The Power House however continued to be used as a substation until 1962, when the trolley bus service was closed. In 1966 the building's chimney was demolished. The building was Grade II listing in 1975.

In 1985, the upper part of the building was converted into residential accommodation, including flats "ingeniously tucked into the roof". The architects were David Clarke Associates. In 1989, the four lower floors of the building were converted by Powell-Tuck Connor & Orefelt into recording studios, including "an elaborate original iron staircase." The studios are used by Metropolis Group.

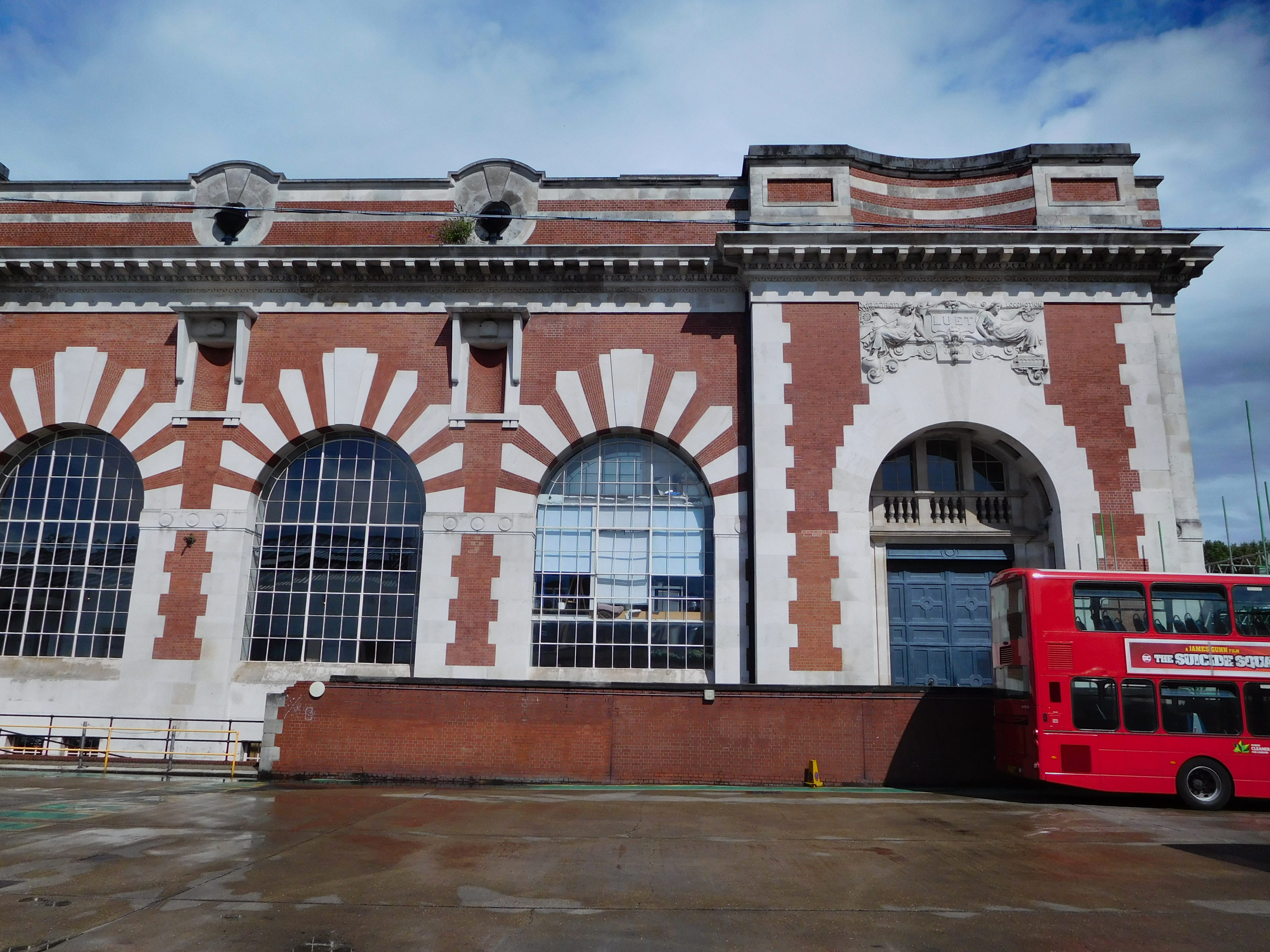
West side

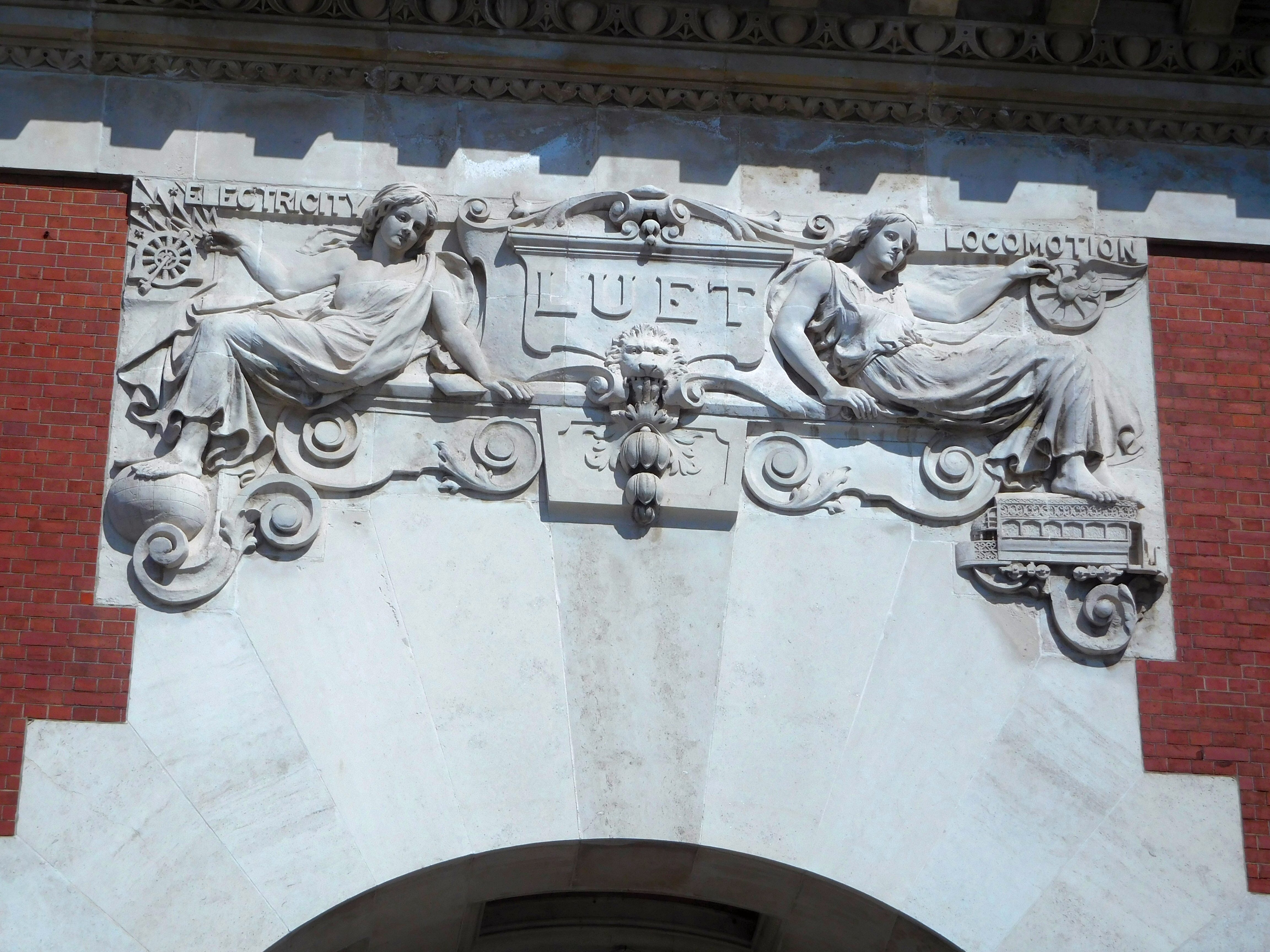
'Electricity' and 'Locomotion' above south doorway

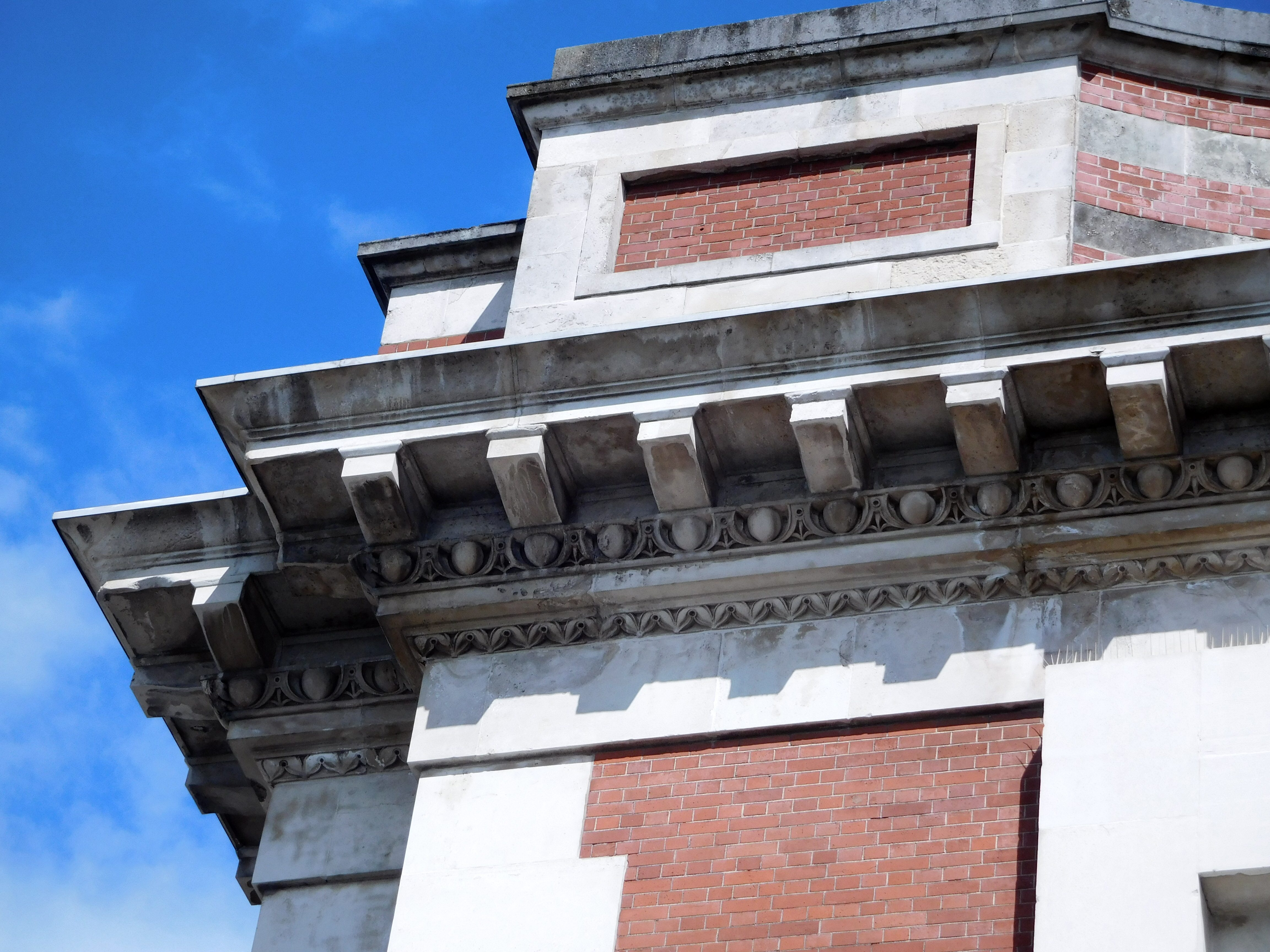
Northwest corner cornice detail
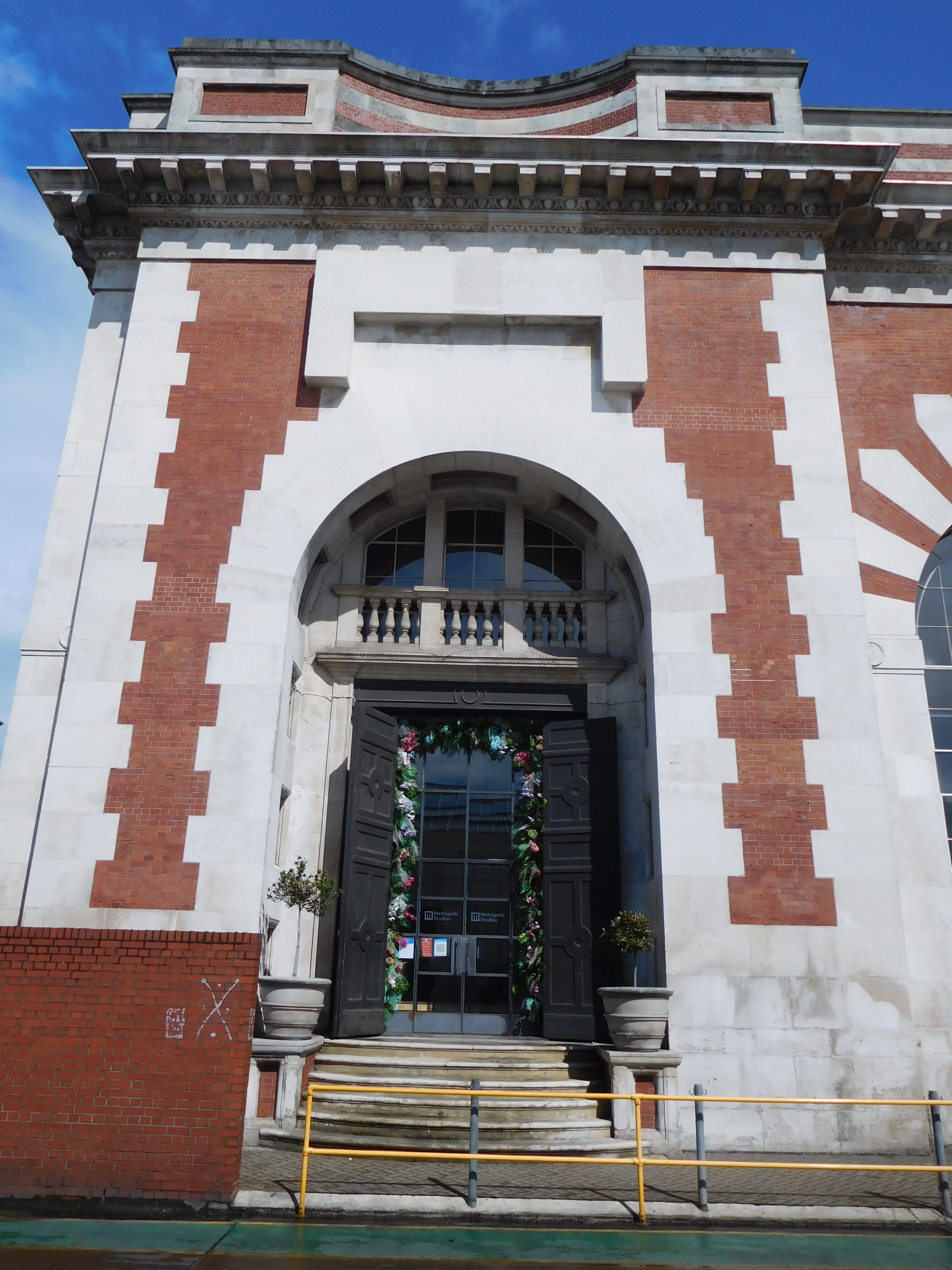
North entrance

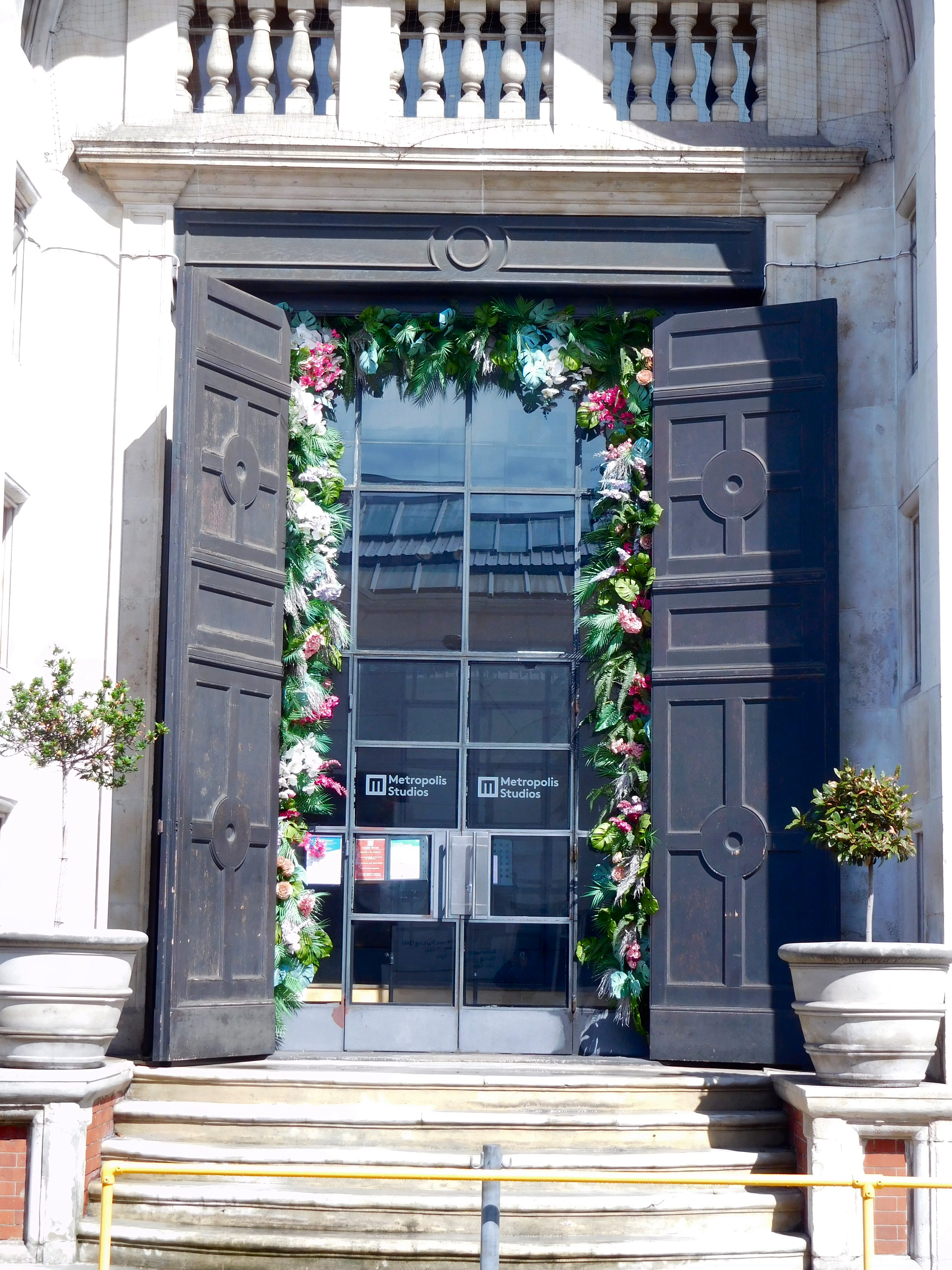
North doorway

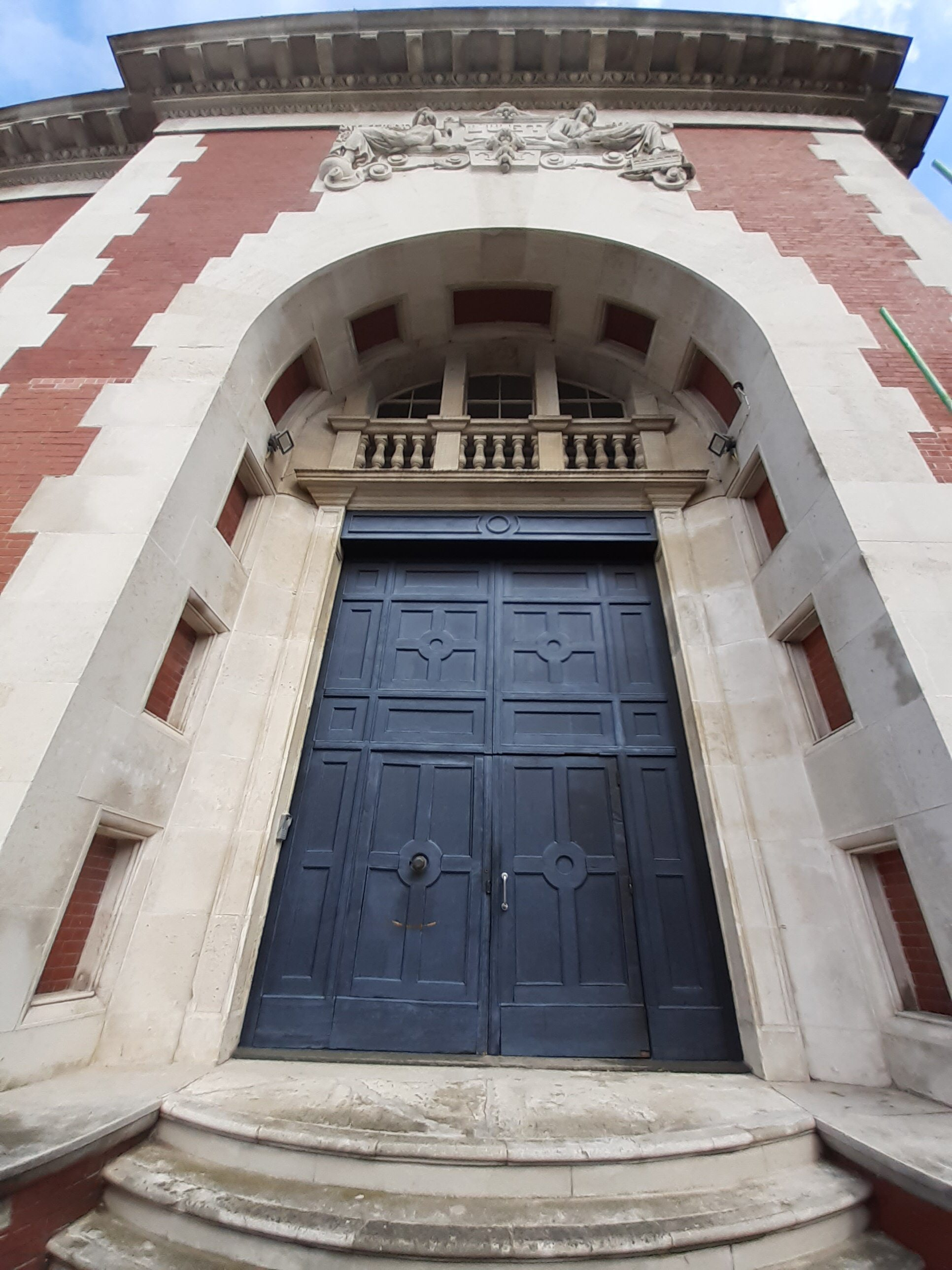
South doorway

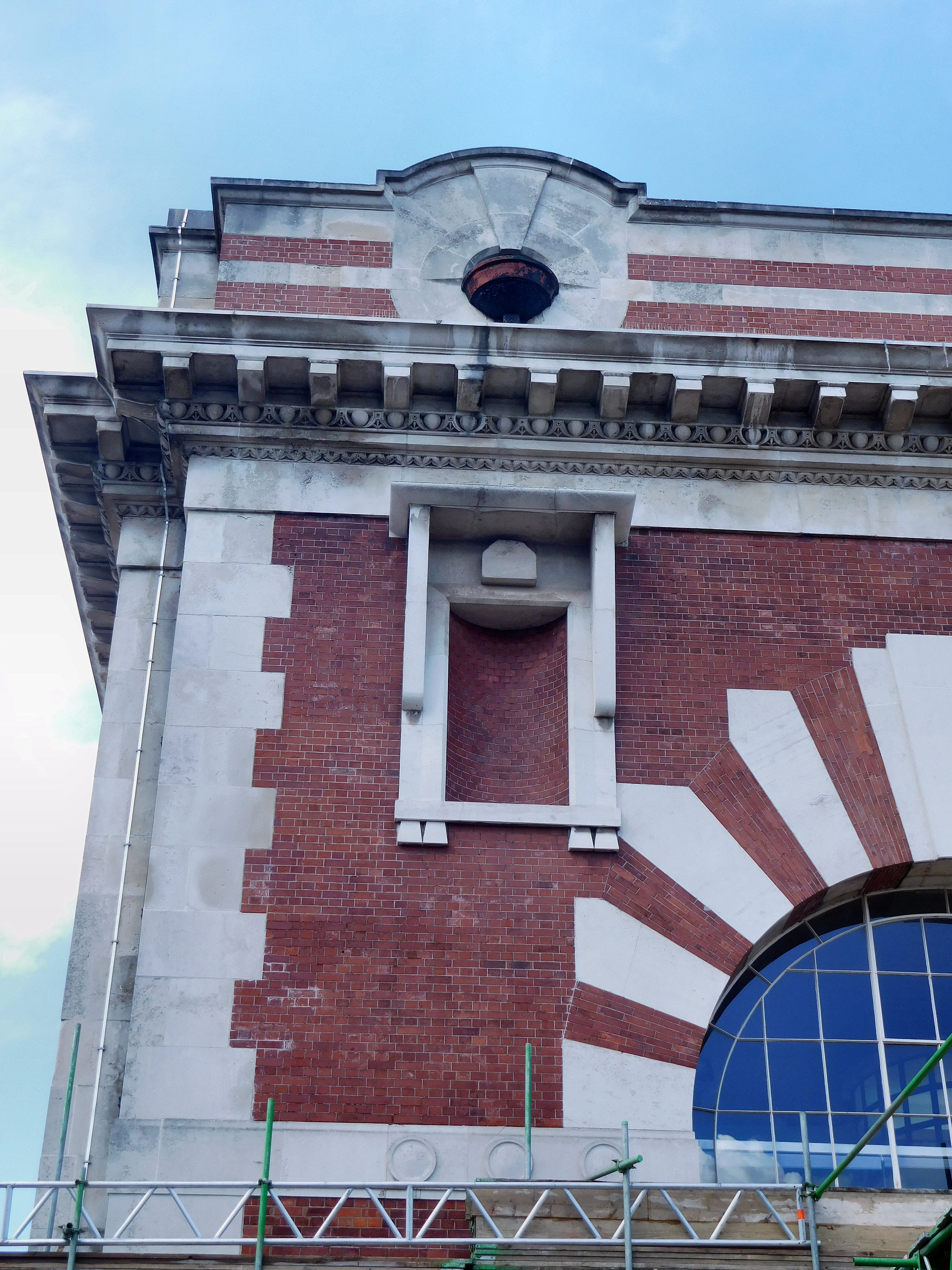
Southwest corner detail

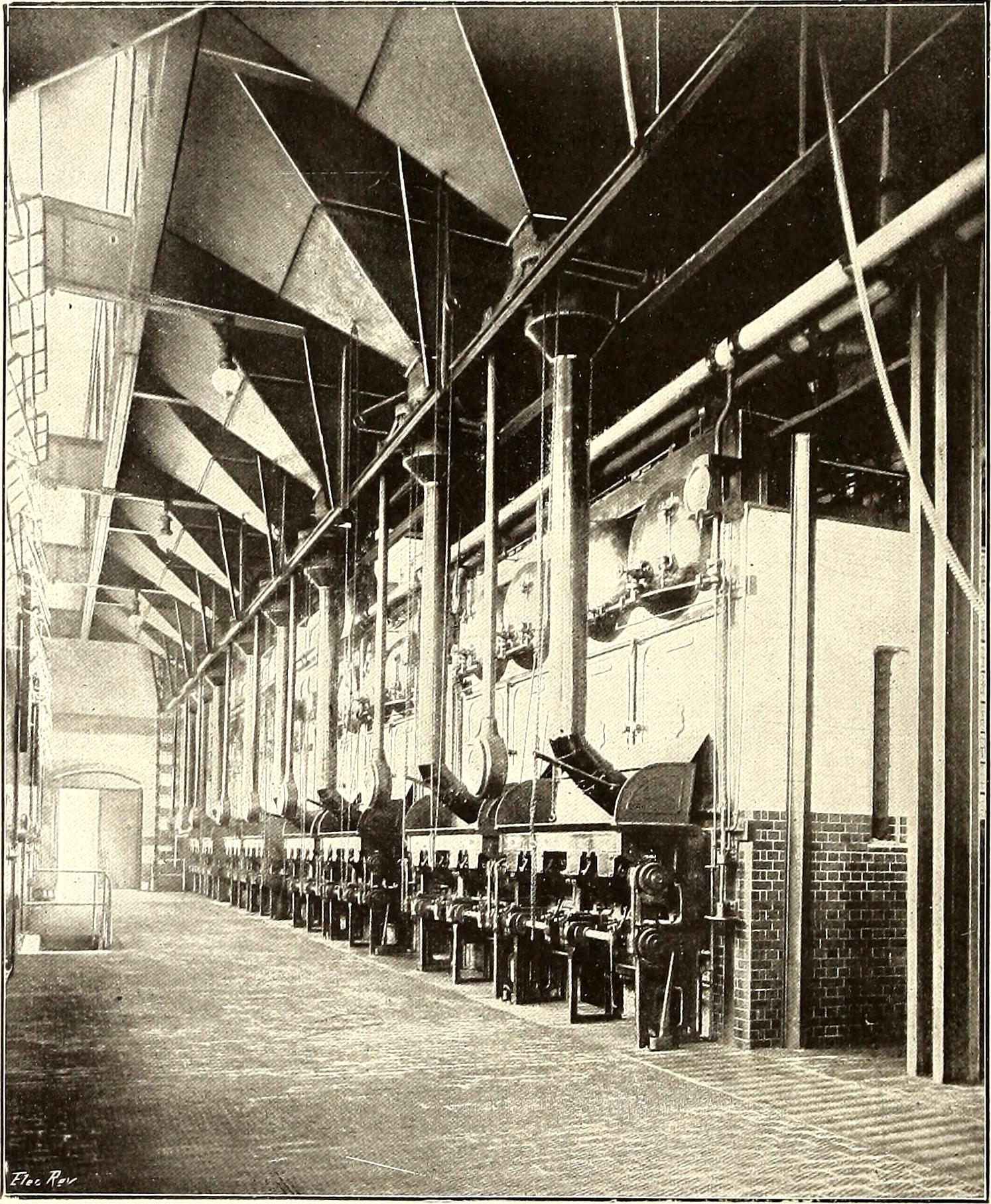
Babcock & Wilcox boilers inside, 1902
