= Devonshire House =

Former London residence of the Dukes of Devonshire

Coordinates: 51.507270°N 0.142756°W

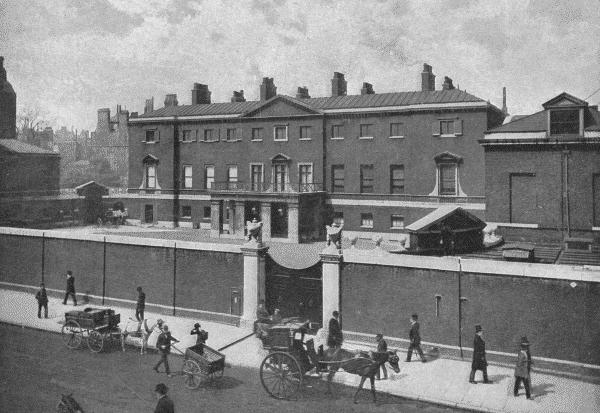
Devonshire House in 1896

Bird's eye recreation of Devonshire House as it was c. 1896

Devonshire House in Piccadilly, was the London townhouse of the Dukes of Devonshire during the 18th and 19th centuries. Following a fire in 1733 it was rebuilt by William Cavendish, 3rd Duke of Devonshire, in the Palladian style, to designs by William Kent. Completed circa 1740, it stood empty after the First World War and was demolished in 1924.

Many of Britain's great noblemen maintained large London houses that bore their names. As a ducal house (only in mainland Europe were such houses referred to as palaces), Devonshire House was one of the largest and grandest, ranking alongside Burlington House, Montague House, Lansdowne House, Londonderry House, Northumberland House, and Norfolk House. All of these have long been demolished, except Burlington and Lansdowne, both of which have been substantially altered.

Today the site is occupied by a namesake modern office building.

== Site ==
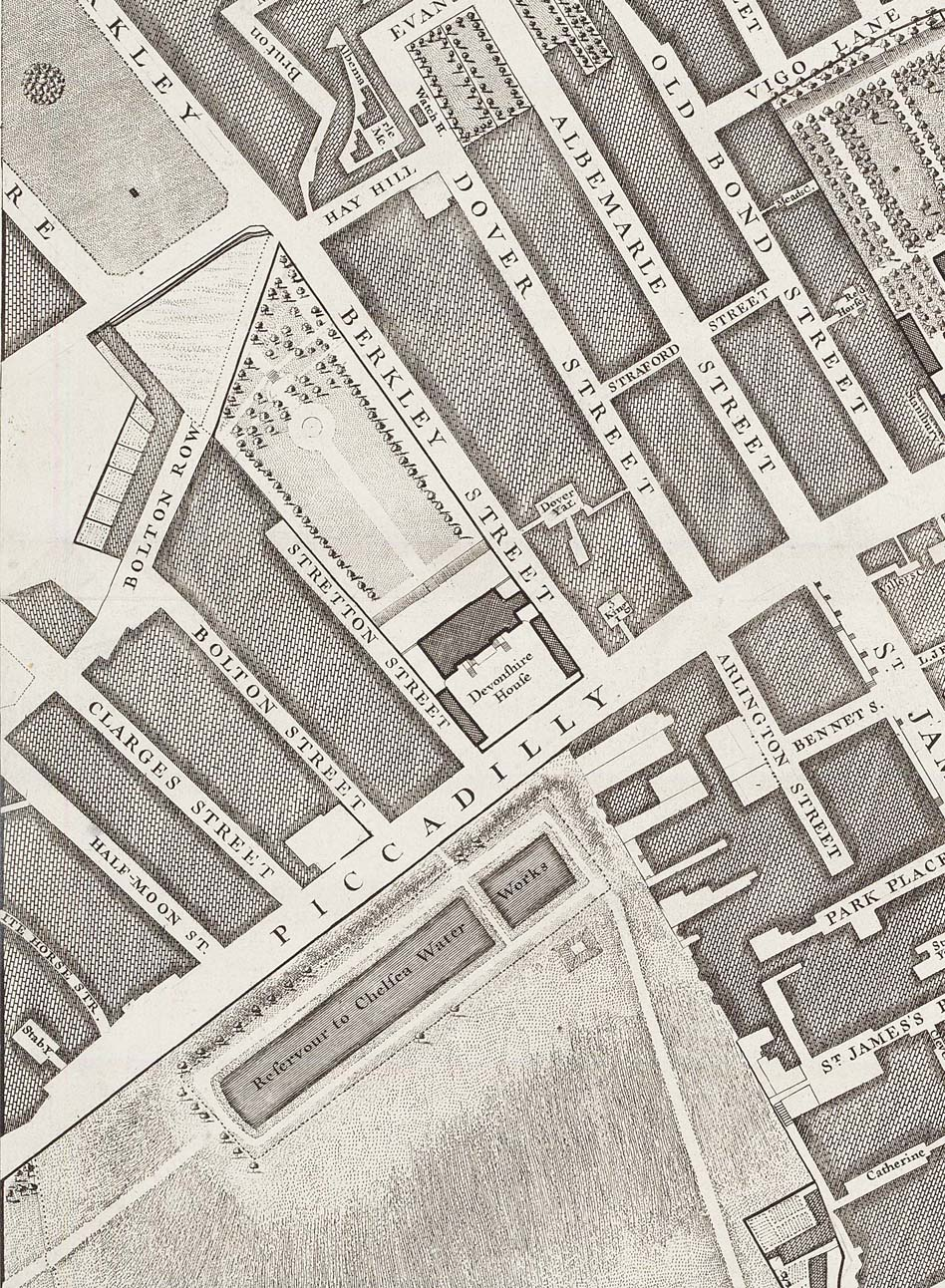
The recently completed Devonshire House on John Rocque's 1746 map of London

Devonshire House occupied the site of Berkeley House, which was built between 1665 and 1673 and at a cost of over £30,000, by John Berkeley, 1st Baron Berkeley of Stratton, of Bruton Priory in Somerset, following his return from service as Viceroy of Ireland. The site is memorialised today by Berkeley Square, Berkeley Street, Stratton Street and Bruton Street. The house was later occupied by Barbara Villiers, Duchess of Cleveland, one of the celebrated mistresses of King Charles II.

Berkeley House, a classical mansion built by Hugh May, having been purchased in 1696 by William Cavendish, 1st Duke of Devonshire, was renamed "Devonshire House". As part of the agreement, John Berkeley, 3rd Baron Berkeley of Stratton (c. 1663–1697) undertook not to build on that part of the land he retained which lay directly behind the house to the north, so preserving the Duke's view. This covenant was still in force when the Berkeley land was developed after 1730, and the gardens of Berkeley Square represent the northern termination of that undeveloped strip, combined in the south with the gardens of Lansdowne House.

On 16 October 1733, whilst undergoing refurbishment, the former Berkeley House was completely destroyed by fire, despite firefighting efforts by the Regiment of Guards, whose barracks were nearby, led by Willem van Keppel, 2nd Earl of Albemarle, and by other local troops led by Frederick, Prince of Wales. The cause was attributed to careless labourers. Ironically, the Duke's former London residence, Old Devonshire House, at 48 Boswell Street, Bloomsbury, survived both its successors until The Blitz during World War II.

== Ethos ==
During the 18th century forms of entertainment began to change and large receptions came into fashion, often taking the form of concerts and balls. Initially, hosts hired one of the many new assembly rooms built to indulge the fashion. It was not long before the more dedicated and wealthy hosts began to add a ballroom to their town houses; the more wealthy still forsook their old-fashionedly proportioned town houses in favour of new and vast palaces designed purely for entertaining. The Duke of Devonshire, an owner of vast estates in Derbyshire and elsewhere, belonged to the latter category. Thus the fire at Devonshire House in 1733 provided the unforeseen opportunity to build one such palace during the height of the fashion.

The 3rd Duke chose the fashionable architect William Kent, for whom this was a first commission for a London house. It was built between 1734 and about 1740. Kent was the protégé of the immensely cultivated 3rd Earl of Burlington and had worked on his Chiswick House, built in 1729, and also at Holkham Hall, completed circa 1741, both in the Palladian style and considered the epitome of fashion and sophistication. Chiswick House later came, with other estates, into the possession of the Dukes of Devonshire through the marriage of the 4th Duke to Lady Charlotte Boyle, daughter and heiress of Lord Burlington.

== Architecture ==
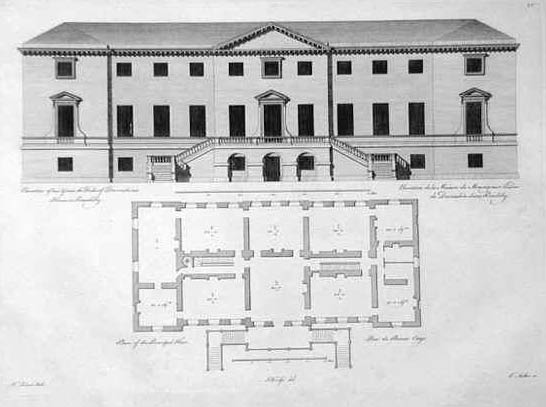
Devonshire House, elevation and plan from Vitruvius Britannicus, Vol.IV, 1767

In typical Palladian style, Devonshire House consisted of a corps de logis flanked by service wings. The severity of the design - three storeys in eleven bays - caused one contemporary critic to liken the mansion to a warehouse, and a modern biographer of Kent to remark on its "plain severity". However, the curiously flat exterior concealed Kent's sumptuous interiors which housed a large part of the Devonshire art collection, considered one of the finest in the United Kingdom, and a renowned library, housed in a room 40 ft long and including amongst its treasures Claude Lorrain's Liber Veritatis, his record in sketches of a lifetime of painting. In the Duke's sitting room a glass case over the chimneypiece contained the best of his collection of engraved gems and Renaissance and Baroque medallions. Such a prominent commission could hardly fail to be included in Vitruvius Britannicus.

The plan of Devonshire House defines it as one of the earliest of the great 18th-century town houses, then designed identically to grand country houses. Its purpose, too, was identical, to display wealth and consequently power. Thus a great town house, by its large size and design, accentuated its owner's power by its contrast with the monotony of the smaller terraced houses surrounding it.

At Devonshire House, Kent's exterior stairs led up to a piano nobile, where the entrance hall was the only room that rose through two storeys. Inconspicuous pairs of staircases are tucked into modest sites at either side, for the upstairs was strictly private.enfilades of interconnecting rooms, of which the largest space is devoted to the library, flank central halls, adjusting the traditions of the symmetrical Baroque state apartments, a design which did not lend itself to large gatherings. A few years later architects such as Matthew Brettingham pioneered a more compact design, with a suite of connecting reception rooms circling a central top-lit stair hall, which allowed guests to "circulate". Greeted at the head of the stairs, they then flowed in a convenient circuit, rather than retracing their steps. This design was first exemplified by the now-demolished Norfolk House completed in 1756. Therefore, it seems that Devonshire House was old-fashioned and unsuited to its intended use almost from the moment of its completion. Thus from the late 18th century its interiors were vastly altered.

== Usage ==
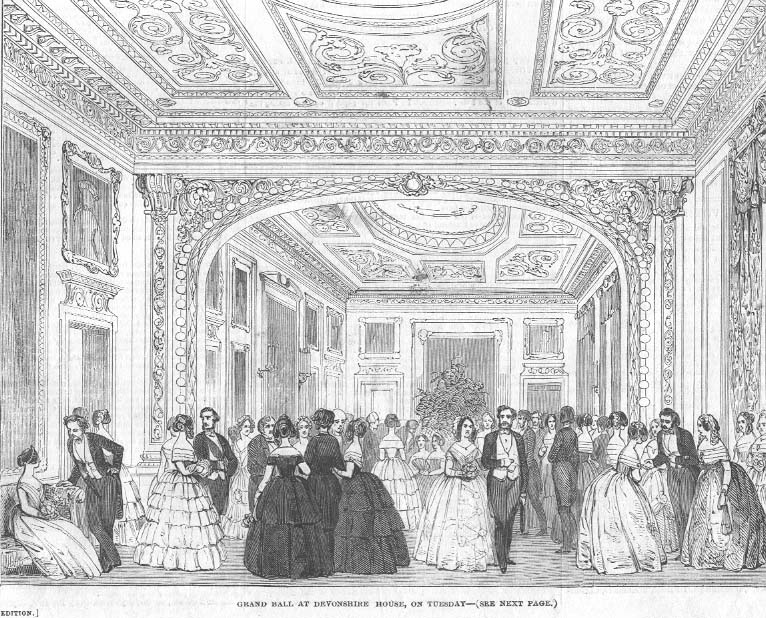
A ball at Devonshire House in 1850, from the Illustrated London News

Alterations were made to Devonshire House by the architect James Wyatt, over the long period 1776–90, and later by Decimus Burton, who in 1843 constructed a new portico, entrance hall and grand staircase for the 6th Duke. At that time the external double staircase was swept away, allowing for formal entrance to be made into the ground floor through the new portico. Hitherto the ground floor had contained only secondary rooms and in 18th century fashion had been the domain of servants.

The new staircase conveyed guests directly to the piano nobile, from a low entrance hall, in a newly created recess formed by creating a convex bow at the centre of the rear garden facade. Known as the "Crystal Staircase", it had a glass handrail and newel posts. Burton amalgamated several of the principal rooms; he created a vast heavily gilded ballroom from two former drawing rooms and often created double height rooms at the expense of the bedrooms above, causing the house to become even more of a place for display and entertaining rather than for living.

Devonshire House was the setting for the social and political life of the circle around William Cavendish, 5th Duke of Devonshire and his duchess, Lady Georgiana Spencer, Whig supporters of Charles James Fox. The house was also the site for Queen Victoria's Diamond Jubilee with a fancy dress ball, known as the Devonshire House Ball of 1897. The guests, including Albert Edward, Prince of Wales and the Princess of Wales, were dressed as historical portraits come to life. The many portrait photographs taken at the ball have illustrated countless books on the social history of the late Victorian era.

== Demolition ==
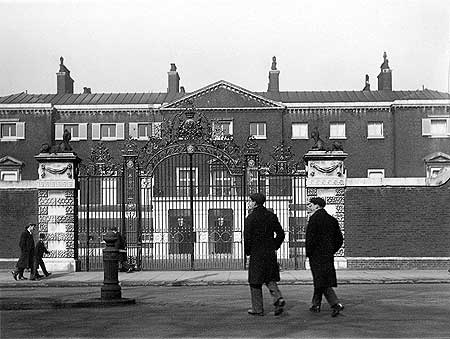
Devonshire House, entrance front on Piccadilly, in 1906.

During World War I Devonshire House was used by the Red Cross, including for dealing with post. Gertrude Bacon was later in charge of this operation, and Rotha Lintorn-Orman served as its commandant, which put her in charge of training all ambulance drivers for the British Red Cross.

After the war, many aristocratic families gave up their London houses and Devonshire House was deserted in 1919. The demolition was mentioned nostalgically several times in literature and caused Virginia Woolf's Clarissa Dalloway to think, as she passed down Piccadilly, of "Devonshire House without its gilt leopards", a reference to the house's gilded gates. It also inspired Siegfried Sassoon's Monody on the Demolition of Devonshire House.

The reason for the abandonment was that the 9th Duke was the first of his family to suffer death duties, which amounted to over £500,000 (£18 million). Additionally, he inherited the debts of the 7th Duke. This double burden prompted the sale of many of the family's valuables, including books printed by William Caxton, many 1st editions of Shakespeare, and Devonshire House itself with its even more valuable three acres of gardens.

The sale was finalised in 1920 at a price of £750,000 (equivalent to £27,038,808 in 2023) and the house was demolished. The two purchasers were Shurmer Sibthorpe and Lawrence Harrison, wealthy industrialists, who built on the site a hotel and block of flats. When told that the proposed demolition was an act of vandalism, Sibthorpe, echoing the building's 18th-century critics, replied: "Archaeologists have gathered round me and say I am a vandal, but personally I think the place is an eyesore."

Following the sale of Devonshire House, the 9th Duke of Devonshire's London home was No. 2 Carlton Gardens. This remainded the London base for the family until it was damaged during the Second World War; in 1950 a new London residence was purchased at No. 19 Hill Street, Mayfair. This house was subsequently sold by Andrew Cavendish, 11th Duke of Devonshire in 1952 due to the substantial death duties levied on the estate after the death of his father Edward Cavendish, 10th Duke of Devonshire in 1950. The 11th Duke purchased a smaller house at No. 4 Chesterfield Street, Mayfair from the-then Foreign Secretary Anthony Eden in January 1952.

== Legacy ==
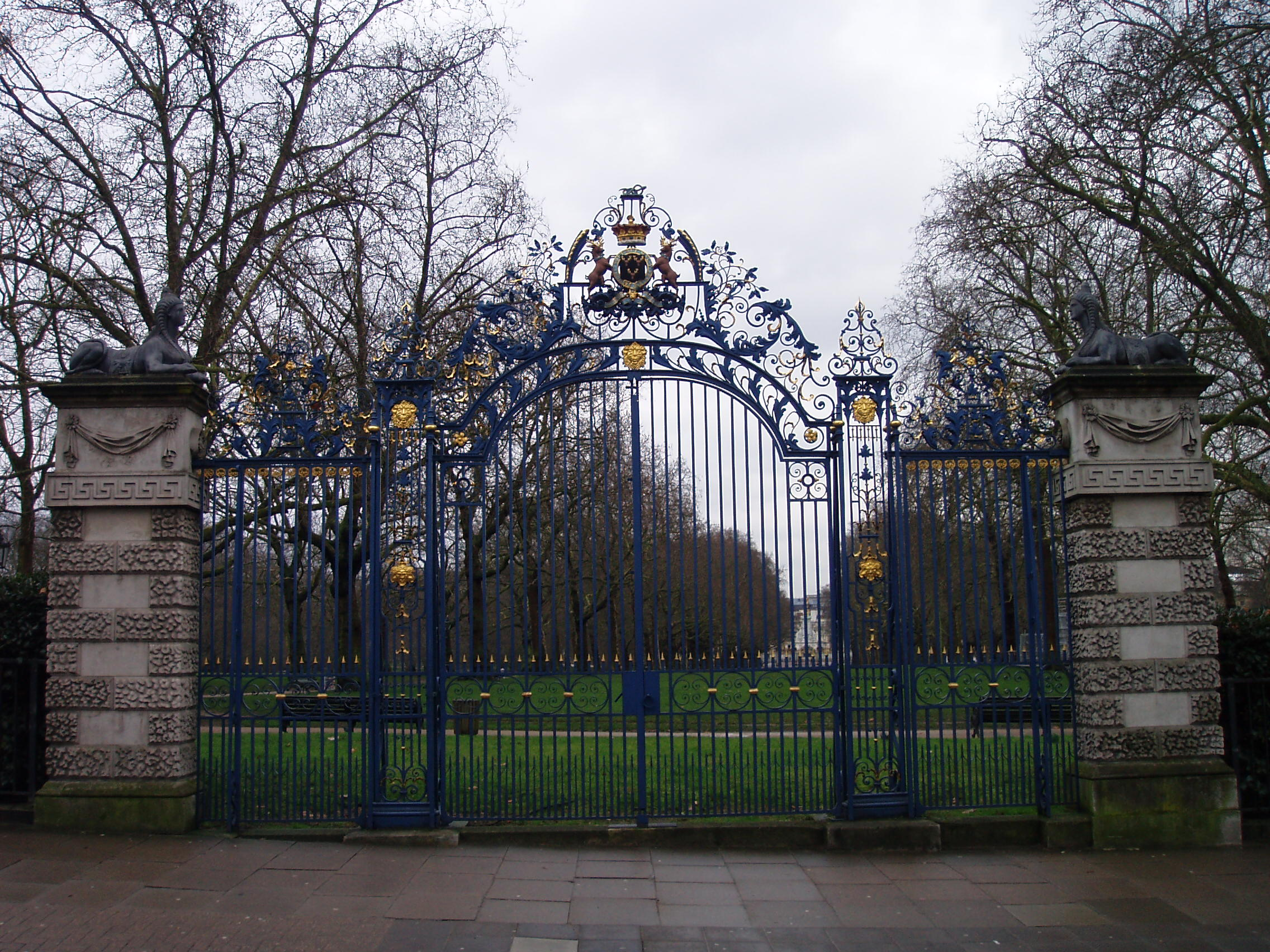
Gates from Devonshire House reused for the entrance to Green Park on the south side of Piccadilly, a few yards away from their original position

The new Devonshire House, designed by Thomas Hastings and Charles Herbert Reilly

In 1924–26 Holland, Hannen & Cubitts built a new office building on the site, fronting directly onto Piccadilly, also known as "Devonshire House". The building became the UK headquarters of the automobile manufacturer Citroën, with showrooms occupying the lower three floors. Citroën remained the chief occupant of the building until 1936. It was also the headquarters of The Rootes Group until the 1960s. During World War II it was occupied by the headquarters of the War Damage Commission.

Some of the paintings and furniture from Devonshire House survive at the Duke's principal seat, Chatsworth House in Derbyshire. The wrought-iron entrance gates, between piers with rusticated quoins and topped with seated sphinxes, have been re-erected on the south side of Piccadilly, to form an entrance to Green Park. The wine cellar is now the ticket office of Green Park Underground station. Other architectural salvage included furniture, doorways and mantelpieces which were relocated to Chatsworth. Some of these stored items were auctioned by Sotheby's on 5–7 October 2010, including five William Kent chimneypieces from Devonshire House described by the auctioneer Lord Dalmeny as being of special interest and value: "You can't buy them because they are all in listed buildings now. It's like being able to commission Rubens to paint your ceiling."

Most of the great detached houses of noblemen which existed in the West End of London, where even the grandest persons often lived in terraced houses, including Devonshire House, Norfolk House and Chesterfield House, are today numbered amongst England's thousands of lost houses; Lansdowne House lost its front to a street-widening scheme. Just a few survive, but in corporate or state ownership. Marlborough House passed to the crown in the 19th century. Apsley House remains a functioning possession of the Dukes of Wellington, but is mostly now a public museum on the edge of a busy roundabout, its gardens long gone (but not built over), with the family occupying the uppermost floor only. Spencer House is an event venue. Manchester House houses the Wallace Collection, a museum open to the public. Bridgewater House, Westminster by Charles Barry is now used as offices. Currently, Dudley House is the only one of London's surviving private palaces to be occupied and used as its design intended.

== See also ==
- List of demolished buildings and structures in London
- Destruction of country houses in 20th-century Britain

== Bibliography ==
- Trease, George (1975). London. London: Thames & Hudson. p. 161.
