= Metropolis Group =

UK music production and entertainment industry company

Coordinates: 51.49322°N 0.24951°W

Metropolis Studios
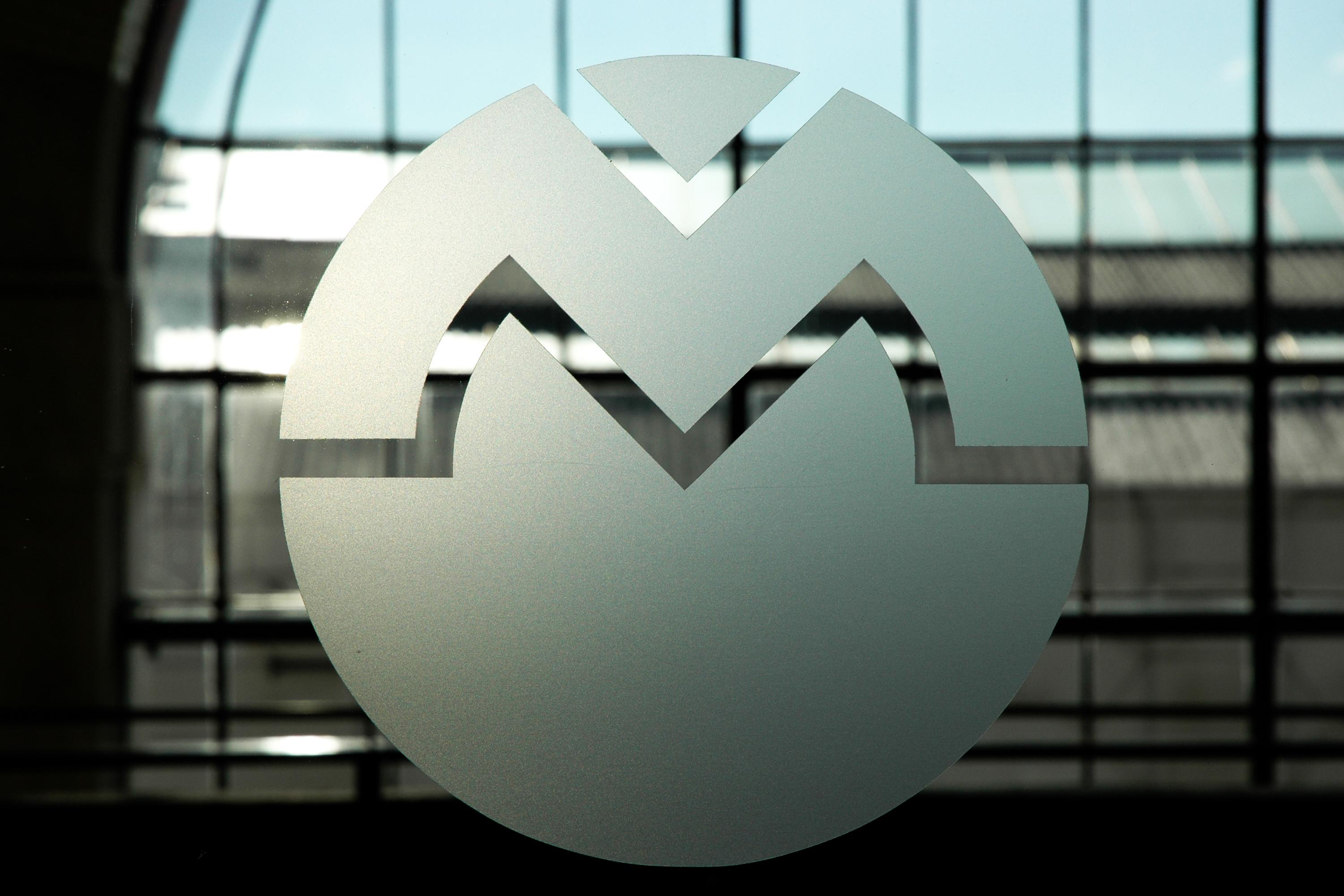

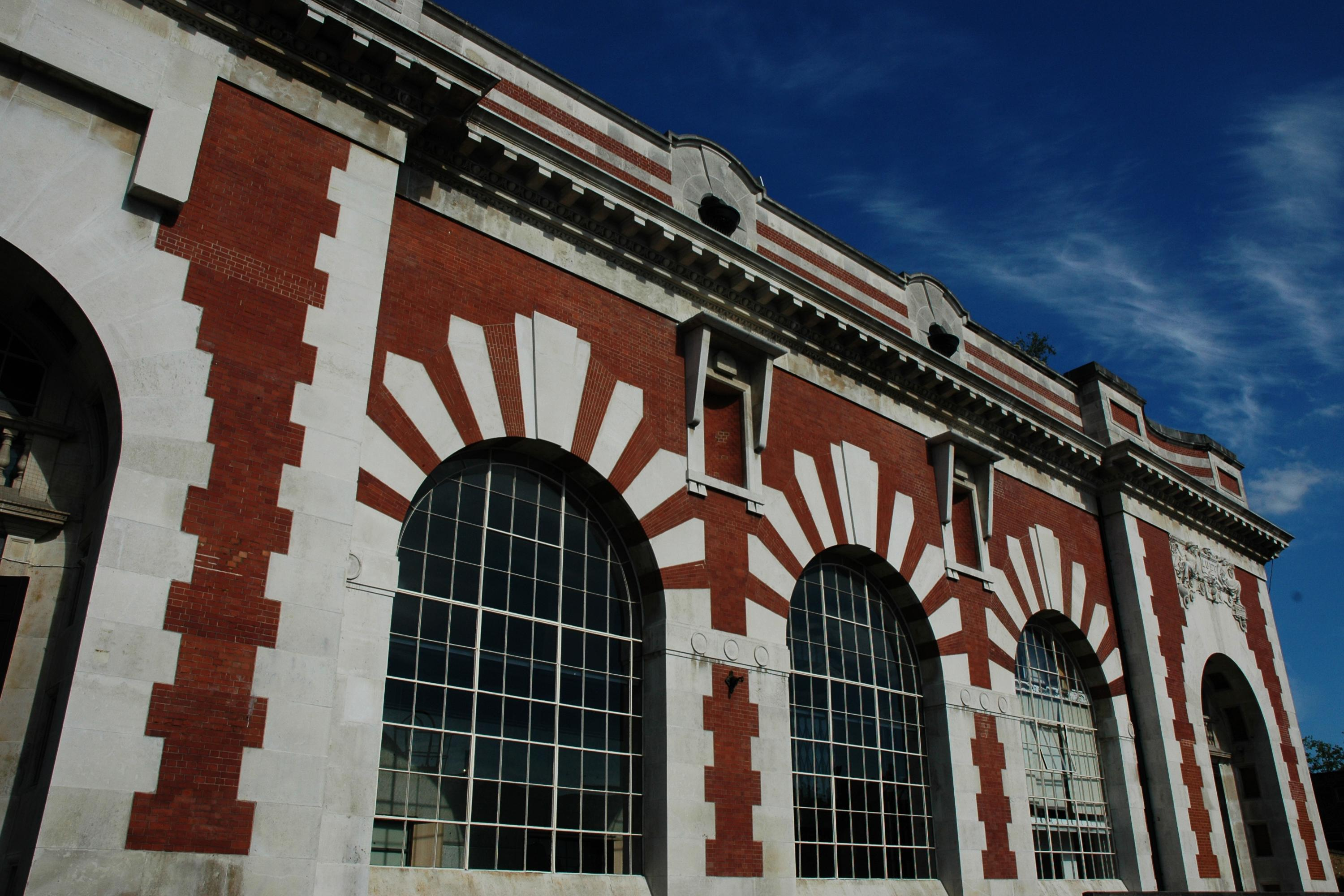
- The Power House
- Type: Recording studio
- Industry: Music
- Founded: 1901
- Area served: City of Westminster, London, England
- Website: thisismetropolis.com

Metropolis Studios is a music production and entertainment company established in 1989 by Gary Langan, Carey Taylor, Karin Clayton and Alexander Skeaping. It is located in the Power House, a Grade II listed building, at 70 Chiswick High Road in Chiswick, London, England. Over the last twenty years the group has expanded and now consists of three divisions: Metropolis Studios, Metropolis Mastering, and Digital Media/Productions.

Metropolis Studios was bought out on 31 May 2013 by MLML (Metropolis London Music Limited), placing it in group with the Academy of Contemporary Music. The Group in 2017 gained a new CEO Richard Connell, a former Sony Music executive.

== History of the Power House ==
The Power House was built in 1901 by a young architect William Curtis Green to power the trams of West London. It originally had a 260-ft. high steel smoke-stack. On the façade, are two large female figures that represent 'electricity' and 'locomotion'. This substantial building was conceived to be so large as to prevent any of the houses in the neighbourhood (which still tended to be large properties with influential owners) suffering from the vibration and dust caused by the steam powered generators. Due to competition from Lots Road Power Station in Chelsea, power was only generated until 1920 when the building was decommissioned and stripped of its equipment. Being mainly used as a storage facility, the Power House gradually fell into disrepair.

Then in 1962 the trolley bus service was closed, the chimney was then demolished in 1966. London Transport (by then the owners) decided to redevelop the site. This led to an outcry and the Victorian Society campaigned for the protection of the building from the developers, which in turn led to the building being listed in 1975, one of the first Victorian buildings to be so nominated, and the first that was built in the 20th century. In 1985, the upper part of the building was converted into flats, including a penthouse which is split over three levels. In 1989, after a large scale redevelopment, the lower part of the building was converted into a recording studios, and the home of Metropolis Studios.

== Studios ==
Metropolis Studios consists of four floors, five recording and mixing studios, and four production rooms. It has a concrete and metal atrium, with steel, plywood and render in other rooms. In the studios, the design engineers have placed obtuse angle to refract sound.

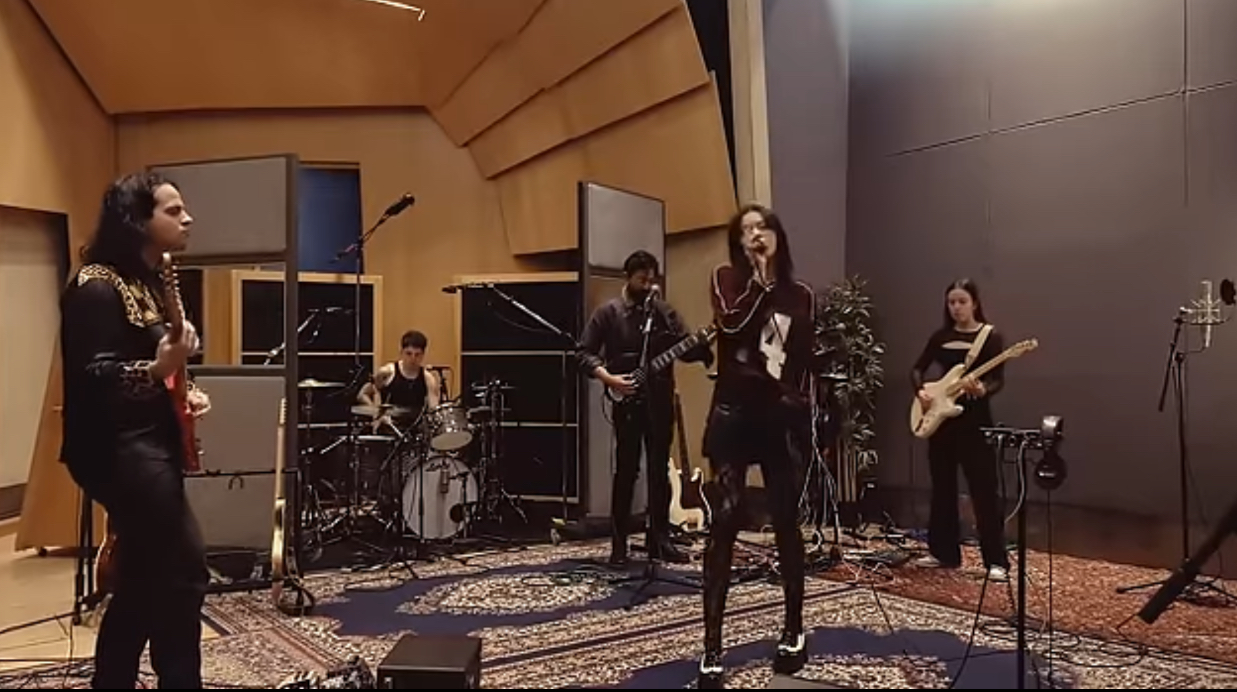
Courtney Hadwin performing at Metropolis Studios

Studio B was used as the London mixing studio for Mark Ronson, when he produced the Back to Black album for Amy Winehouse. Studio A was used by Courtney Hadwin to record all her songs live, The studios has also been used in the past by Queen, George Michael, U2, Lady Gaga, Courtney Hadwin, Little Mix, Adele, Rihanna and Lauryn Hill.

== Mastering ==
Established in 1993, Metropolis Mastering was founded by Tony Cousins, Ian Cooper, Tim Young and Crispin Murray, with the aim to “to master audio to a standard never previously achieved”. Metropolis houses five mastering rooms that were designed to a high specification utilising equipment from brands such as PMC Ltd., Bryston and Prism. Two of the rooms were designed with stereo and 5.1 surround sound in mind, while the others are set up for cutting vinyl with a Neumann VMS-80 disc cutting lathe. In more recent years, Metropolis Mastering began offering an online mastering service which enabled clients to receive these services remotely.

Additions to the original founding team of engineers include: Stuart Hawkes, John Davis, Matt Colton, Andy 'Hippy' Baldwin, Felix Davis, Mike Hillier and Natalie Bibby.

== 3D Audio ==
In summer 2021, Metropolis Studios launched their 3D Audio studio for mixing in all spatial formats. It is currently the highest resolution Dolby Atmos studio in the UK. The studio is designed to be as versatile as possible in order to accommodate as many different workflows as possible including realtime immersive mixing of livestreams. The room provides a 22.2 Georg Neumann monitoring system, with loudspeakers in an 11.1.8 configuration. All the loudspeakers are arrayed at 30° of separation to each other. The studio can accommodate all possible formats, incoming mixing consoles and caters for several interface formats including MADI, Dante (networking), AES3 and Ravenna (networking).

When the studio launched, Amazon Music agreed a content deal with Metropolis to become their UK-based headquarters for immersive mixing which in turn, has led to many record labels following suit to utilise the facility. The first three months post-launch saw spatial mixes delivered for the likes of Jack Savoretti, The Amazons, Major Lazer, Rag'n'Bone Man, Disclosure (band), St. Vincent (musician), Bonobo (musician), The Vaccines, Cautious Clay and Anne-Marie.
