= 1–6 Lombard Street =

Office building in London, England

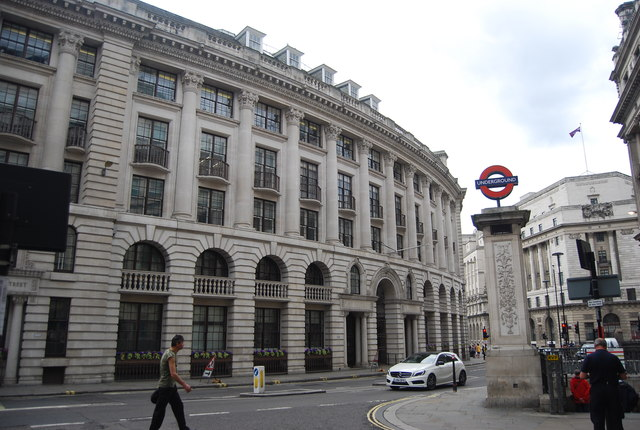
- 1–6 Lombard Street

General information
- Type: Office
- Architectural style: Edwardian
- Location: London, England
- Coordinates: 51°30′47″N 0°05′20″W
- Completed: 1915

Design and construction
- Architects: William Curtis Green with Dunn & Watson

Listed Building – Grade II
- Official name: 1-6, LOMBARD STREET EC3
- Designated: 10 November 1977
- Reference no.: 1286139

1–6 Lombard Street or the Scottish Provident Institution Building is an office building that stands on Lombard Street, next to Mansion House overlooking Bank Junction in the City of London. It is a Grade II listed by English Heritage.

== History and description ==
The building was constructed between 1908 and 1915 for the Scottish Provident Institution. It was designed by Curtis Green in partnership with Dunn & Watson, providing him with an opportunity to work on the firm's largest London building.

The building has a long convex facade with giant Corinthian order columns spanning the upper floors. Decorative carving work on the building was undertaken by Laurence Arthur Turner with Byzantine inspiration. Refurbishment on the building was carried out between 1985 and 1987 as well as 2006 and 2024. Both times the original facade was maintained.

== See also ==
- Mansion House
