= Arthur Romney Green =

English furniture designer

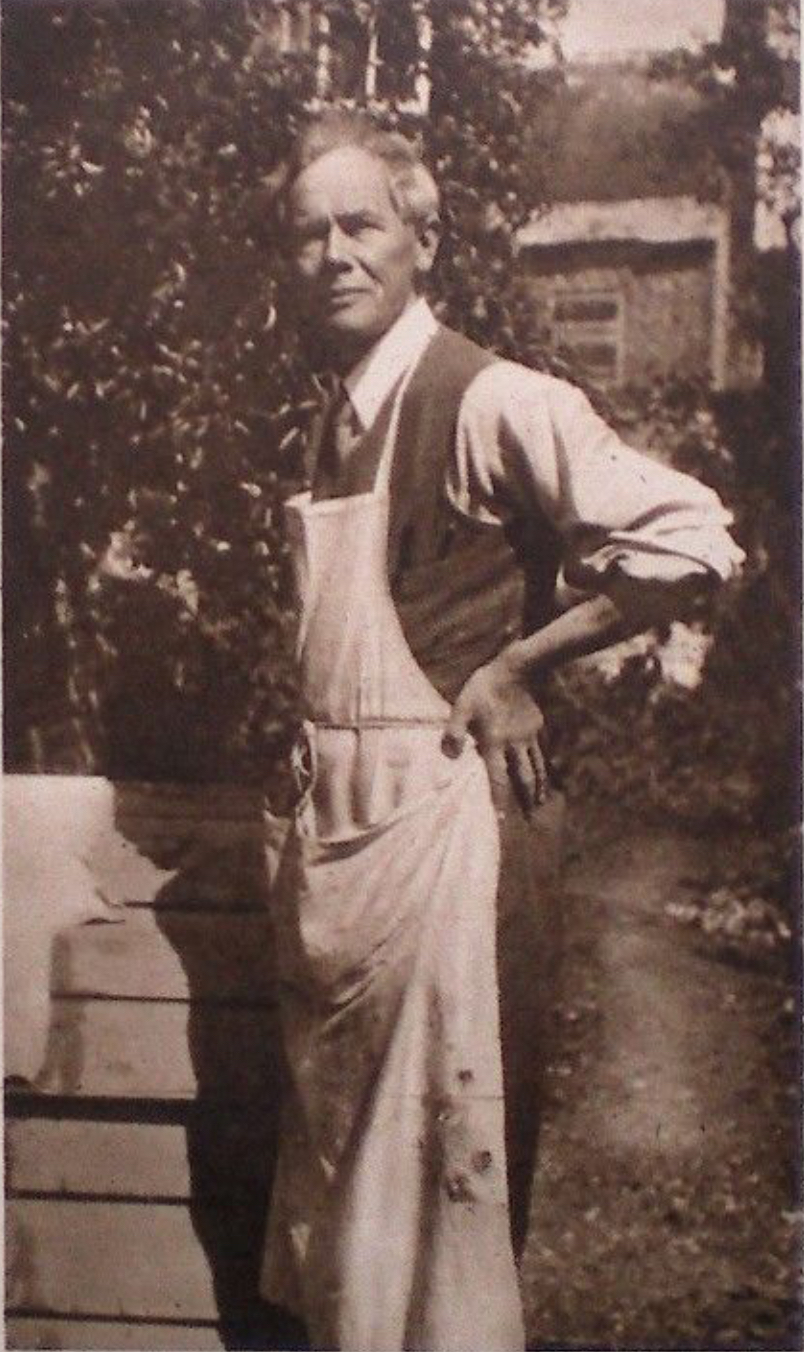
Romney Green, later in life

Arthur Romney Green (16 February 1872 – 21 February 1945) was an English craftsman and furniture designer, based in Christchurch, Hampshire. His furniture carries influence of the Arts and Crafts style, popularized by William Morris in the 1880s. Some examples of Romney Green's furniture are exhibited in Christchurch Priory, All Saints Church in Catherington, Hampshire, and the Victoria and Albert Museum in Brompton, London. He was the elder brother of the English architect William Curtis Green.

== Early life ==
Green was born in Alton, Hampshire. He was the eldest son to Frederick Green, a barrister, and his wife Maria née Heath Curtis. His younger brother was the English architect William Curtis Green.

== Career ==
Green initially taught mathematics at Cambridge but left to concentrate on furniture design and woodwork and set up business in Christchurch, Dorset. His work, according to the architect Hubert Worthington, "combines underlying geometric principles with the traditional practices associated with the work of Ernest Gimson and the Barnsley brothers, but he was also indebted to Georgian prototypes." Romney Green was the author of Woodwork in Principle and Practice in 1918. He used locally sourced timber which he sold direct to the customer, rather than through retailers.

Green believed that small scale workshops would help solve the problems of unemployment. During the 1930s he supervised workshops for the unemployed under the auspices of the Rural Industries Bureau, and during the war years, employed invalided ex-soldiers and taught them woodworking skills. He offered apprenticeships, many of whom went on to set up as master craftsmen in their own right. He offered placements to boys who were experiencing educational difficulties which allowed them to learn a trade and increase their self-esteem and literacy skills.

Green held essay readings and discussions at his home, which were sometimes attended by Eric Gill and Bertrand Russell. Green also lectured at Christchurch Adult School on such topics as the poetry of William Morris.

== Personal life ==
Green was married twice; he left his first wife, Florence, and started a relationship with Bertha Ann Murray née Morris whom he married in 1928. He died of a cerebral haemorrhage aged 73 on 5 February 1945, having been involved in cycling accident in Christchurch, Dorset. He was buried in Christchurch Cemetery on 24 February 1945, along with his wife, Bertha, who had predeceased him by three years.

== Legacy ==
Green's furniture designs carry influence of the Arts and Crafts style. Some examples of his furniture are exhibited in Christchurch Priory, All Saints Church in Catherington, Hampshire, and the Victoria & Albert Museum, London.
