= Paul Reilly, Baron Reilly =

British designer (1912–1990)

Paul Reilly, Baron Reilly (29 May 1912 – 11 October 1990) was a British designer.

Reilly was born in Liverpool, the son of Sir Charles Herbert Reilly, Roscoe Professor of Architecture at the University of Liverpool. He was educated at Winchester College, Hertford College, Oxford, where he read Philosophy, Politics and Economics, and the London School of Economics. He was the Director of the Design Council (formerly the Council of Industrial Design) between 1960 and 1977.

Reilly was knighted in 1967. On 20 July 1978, he was made a life peer, as Baron Reilly, of Brompton in the Royal Borough of Kensington and Chelsea. He sat as a crossbencher in the House of Lords.
