= Stratton House, London =

Office building in London, England

Stratton House
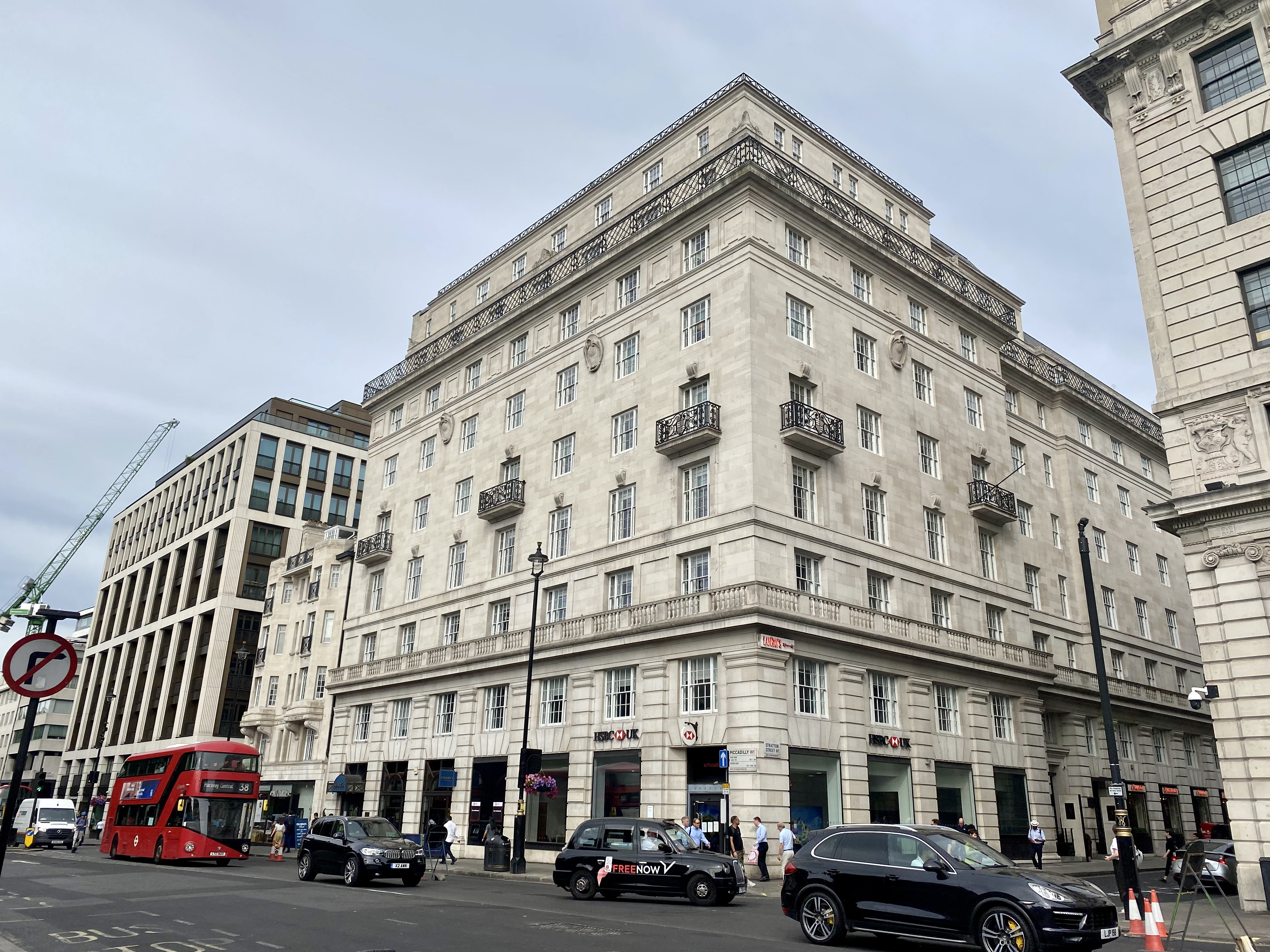

General information
- Type: Office
- Location: London, England
- Coordinates: 51°30′24″N 0°08′36″W
- Completed: 1928

Design and construction
- Architect: William Curtis Green

Listed Building – Grade II
- Official name: Stratton House
- Designated: 30 May 1972
- Reference no.: 1265713

Stratton House is a Grade II listed office block that stands on Piccadilly in the Mayfair area of London.

== History and description ==
The building was built between 1926 and 1928 to the designs of William Curtis Green. Considered a less accomplished work than his earlier National Westminster Bank branch at 63 Piccadilly, it takes architectural cues from the neighbouring Devonshire House.

The building hosted the Dutch government-in-exile during the Second World War.

== See also ==
- Devonshire House
