= Devonshire House (1926) =

Office building in London, England

General information
- Type: Office, originally residential
- Location: London, England
- Coordinates: 51°30′26″N 0°08′34″W
- Completed: 1926

Design and construction
- Architects: Thomas Hastings and Charles Herbert Reilly

Listed Building – Grade II
- Official name: Devonshire House
- Designated: 30 May 1972
- Reference no.: 1226746

Devonshire House is a Grade II listed office block that stands on Piccadilly in the Mayfair area of London.

== History and description ==
The building was built on the site of Devonshire House, a grand townhouse which was home to the Dukes of Devonshire and had been built on the site of an older house which had burnt down in 1733.

The house was sold in 1918 by Victor Cavendish and demolished to make way for new development. The southern section of the plot, which had been occupied by the house itself, was built by Holland, Hannen & Cubitts as a speculative venture, originally intending it as a residential development. Charles Herbert Reilly, associate architect for the project, was instrumental in bringing in the American firm Carrère and Hastings for the design of the building. The building is of Portland stone and was the first in London to have plumbing services installed before partitions. The American architectural influence is visible in the building's design.

Instead of residences, the building has for most of its history been used as offices, including for Citroën who, accommodated by the initial plans for extensive retail space, used the building as their west end showroom.

== See also ==
- Stratton House
