= Dutch government-in-exile =

WWII government of the Netherlands during Nazi occupation

Dutch government-in-exile Nederlandse regering in ballingschap
- 1940–1945
- Flag Coat of arms
- Status: Government in exile
- Capital: Amsterdam
- Capital-in-exile: London
- Queen
  - 1940–1945: Wilhelmina
- Prime Minister
  - 1940: Dirk Jan de Geer
  - 1940–1945: Pieter Sjoerds Gerbrandy
- Historical era: World War II
  - Surrender of the Dutch Army in the Battle of the Netherlands: 15 May 1940
  - Liberation from Nazi Germany: 5 May 1945
Preceded by	Succeeded by
Netherlands	Netherlands

The Dutch government-in-exile (Dutch: Nederlandse regering in ballingschap), also known as the London Cabinet (Dutch: Londens kabinet), was the government in exile of the Netherlands, supervised by Queen Wilhelmina, that fled to London after the German invasion of the country during World War II on 4 May 1940. The government had control over the Free Dutch Forces.

== Invasion and exile ==
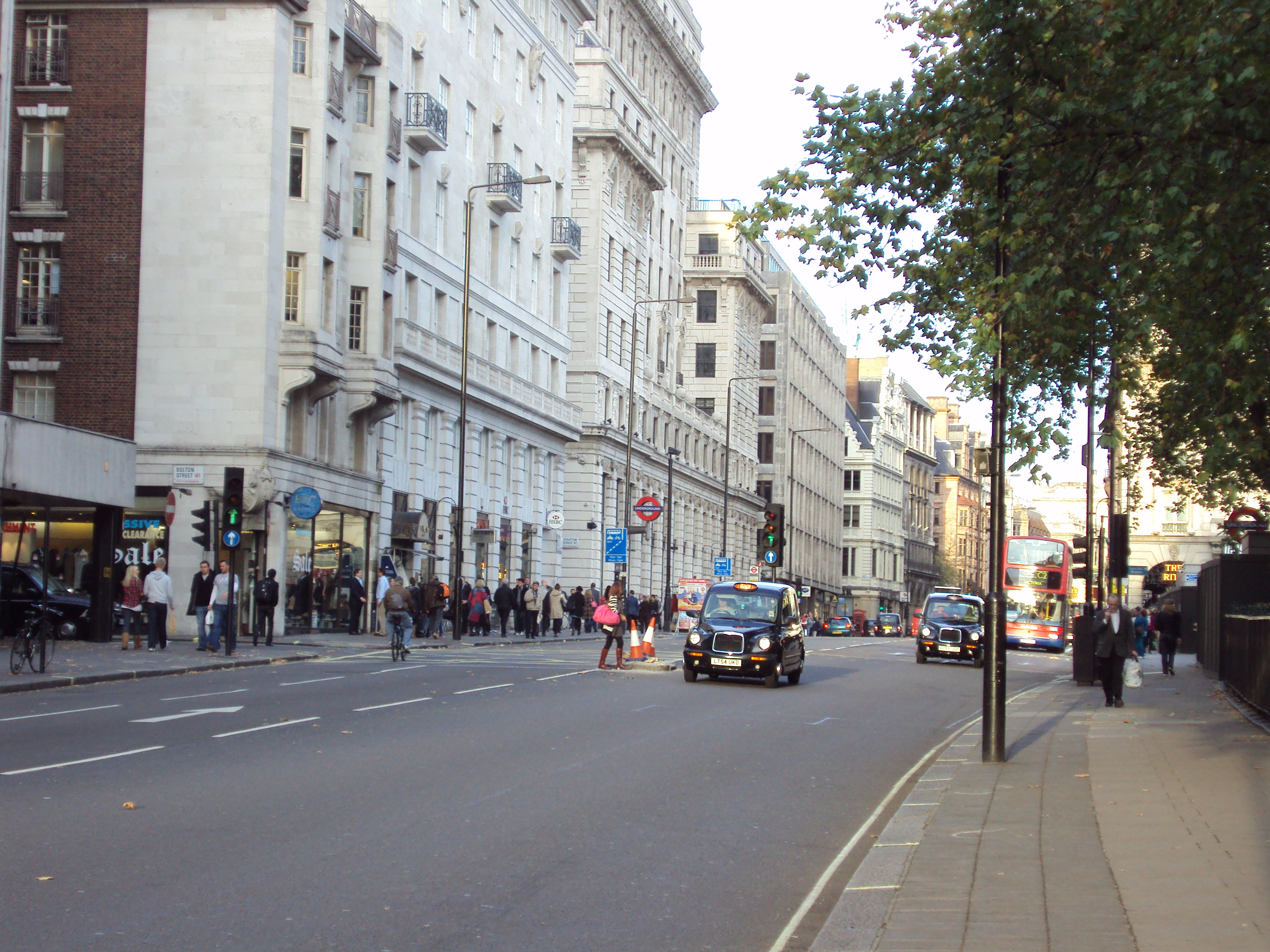
Stratton House on Piccadilly by Green Park, where the Dutch government-in-exile was based.

Until 1940, the Netherlands was a neutral country that was generally on good terms with Germany. On 10 May 1940 Germany invaded the Netherlands. Queen Wilhelmina fled the country aboard the British destroyer HMS Hereward, arriving in London on 13 May. The Dutch armed forces surrendered two days later as they had been unable to withstand the speed of Germany's Blitzkrieg style attack. To safeguard the succession, the heir to the throne, Princess Juliana, along with her family, was sent farther away to Canada, where they stayed the rest of the war in-exile.

== Exile in London ==
In London, the queen took charge of the Dutch government-in-exile, which was established at Stratton House in the Piccadilly area of London, opposite Green Park.

Initially, their hope was that France would regroup and liberate the country. Although there was such an attempt, it soon failed, and the Allied forces were surrounded and forced to evacuate at Dunkirk. The Dutch armed forces in the Netherlands except for those occupying Zeeland surrendered on 15 May 1940.

The government-in-exile was soon faced with a dilemma. After France had been defeated, the Vichy French government came to power and proposed to Adolf Hitler a policy of collaboration. That led to a conflict between Prime Minister Dirk Jan de Geer and the Queen. De Geer wanted to return to the Netherlands and collaborate as well. The government-in-exile was still in control of the Dutch East Indies with all its resources and was the third-largest oil producer in the world, after the United States and the Soviet Union. Wilhelmina realised that if the Dutch collaborated with Germany, the Dutch East Indies would be surrendered to Japan, as French Indochina was surrendered later by orders of the Vichy government.

The Queen dismissed De Geer as prime minister and replaced him with Pieter Sjoerds Gerbrandy, who worked with the Allied forces towards a liberation plan for the Netherlands instead of collaboration with the Nazi-occupier.

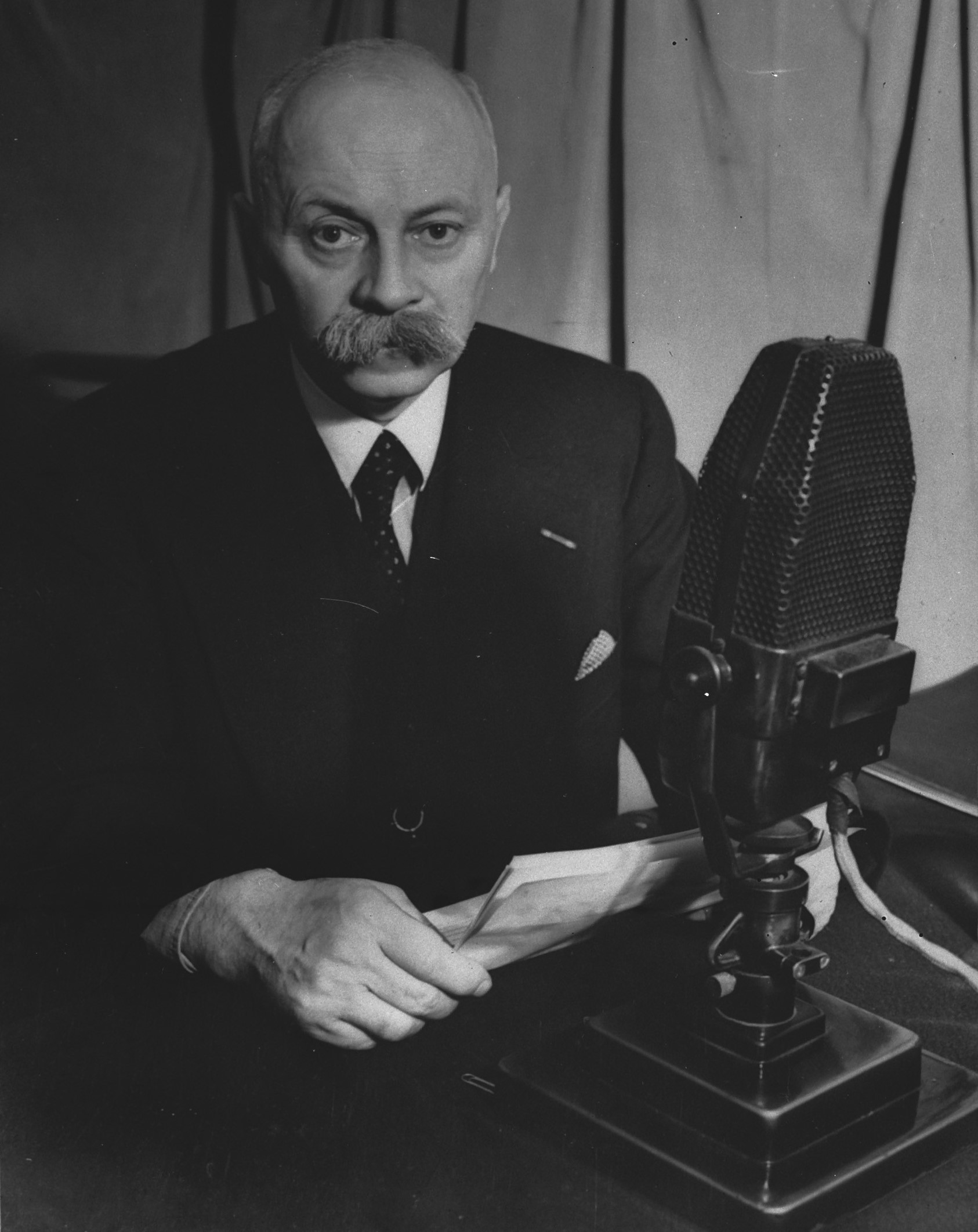
Pieter Sjoerds Gerbrandy, Prime Minister of the exiled government at a BBC microphone, 23 September 1941

During the annexation of the Netherlands, the Dutch colonies of the Dutch West Indies included Surinam ('Dutch Guiana') and the Dutch Caribbean; (Note: Still part of the Kingdom of the Netherlands today.) Aruba, Bonaire, Curaçao, Saba, Sint Eustatius, and Sint Maarten. Aruba and Curaçao, with world-class exporting oil refineries, were important suppliers of refined products to the Allies. Surinam was one of the most important bauxite (for aluminium) suppliers, which was vital to the war airplane industry. The Dutch government-in-exile also had a large merchant fleet at its disposal, which could be used to help the alliance. Aruba became a British protectorate from 1940 to 1942, and a US protectorate from 1942 to 1945. On 23 November 1941, under an agreement with the Dutch government-in-exile, the US occupied Surinam to protect the bauxite mines.

In September 1944, the Dutch, Belgian, and the Luxembourgish governments in exile began formulating an agreement over the creation of a Benelux Customs Union. The agreement was signed in the London Customs Convention on 5 September 1944.

The Queen's unusual action was later ratified by the States General of the Netherlands in 1946. Churchill called her "the only man in the Dutch government". After World War II ended, Wilhelmina and her government returned from exile to re-establish a regime more democratic than ever before.

== Militair Gezag ==
In 1943, Dutch military officer Hendrik Johan Kruls was tasked with preparing a Dutch-led military administration in the Netherlands in the event that the allies would enter the country, known as the Militair Gezag (Military Authority). In June 1944, the allies landed in Normandy and re-opened the western front, and in the ensuing months gradually advanced to the Siegfried Line. On 12 September 1944, the allies crossed the Belgium–Netherlands border and Mesch became the first Dutch village to be liberated. Soon after on the 14th, the allies liberated Maastricht, marking the first Dutch urban city to fall in the hands of the allies. That same day the Militair Gezag was established in the Netherlands, with Maastricht as its capital and Kruls at its head, marking the return of the Dutch government to its own country, albeit under a military administration rather than an elected one. On 5 May 1945, the Netherlands was liberated. Eventually, the Militair Gezag was dissolved on 4 March 1946.

== See also ==
- Binnenlandse Strijdkrachten
- Dutch resistance
- Netherlands in World War II
- Netherlands Indies Civil Administration, established in 1944
- Operation Neuland
- Radio Oranje
- Reichskommissariat Niederlande
