= Charles Herbert Reilly =

British architect (1874–1948)

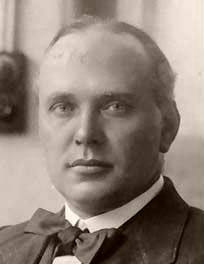
Charles Herbert Reilly, before 1914

Sir Charles Herbert Reilly (4 March 1874 – 2 February 1948) was an English architect and teacher. After training in two architectural practices in London he took up a part-time lectureship at the University of London in 1900, and from 1904 to 1933 he headed the University of Liverpool School of Architecture, which became world-famous under his leadership. He was largely responsible for establishing university training of architects as an alternative to the old system of apprenticeship.

Reilly was a strong and effective opponent of the Victorian Neo-Gothic style, which had dominated British architecture for decades. His dominance also ended the briefer popularity of the Arts and Crafts and Jugendstil movements in Britain, earning him the enmity of Charles Rennie Mackintosh, an exponent of the latter. For many years Reilly favoured a form of Neo-Classicism strongly influenced by developments in American architecture. Later in his career, he embraced the principles of the modernist movement, and of town planning for social and aesthetic improvement.

As a practising architect, Reilly was responsible for few well-known buildings. His influence on British architecture came through the work of his pupils, who included Herbert Rowse, Lionel Budden, William Holford and Maxwell Fry. Among his students were future professors of architecture and heads of architectural colleges in Britain, Canada and Australia; buildings were commissioned from Reilly pupils throughout the British Empire and beyond.

== Life and career ==
=== Early years ===
Reilly was born on the Seven Sisters Road in Manor House, London, the son of the architect and surveyor Charles Reilly (1844–1928) and his wife Annie, née, Mee. Whilst Reilly was still very young, the family moved to a large Regency period house, just nearby on Woodberry Down. His family remained in the same house for the next two decades He was educated at a preparatory school in Hove between the ages of nine and 13, and then at Merchant Taylors' School, London, and Queens' College, Cambridge. As an undergraduate he helped to found the Cambridge branch of the Fabian Society; he retained his left-leaning views all his life. After graduating with a first class degree in mechanical science, he worked for two years as an unpaid draughtsman at his father's office, and then joined the office of John Belcher as an "improver". (Note: The Oxford English Dictionary defines an improver as "A person who works at a trade under an employer for the purpose of improving his or her knowledge or skill, and accepts the opportunity of such improvement wholly or in part instead of wages")

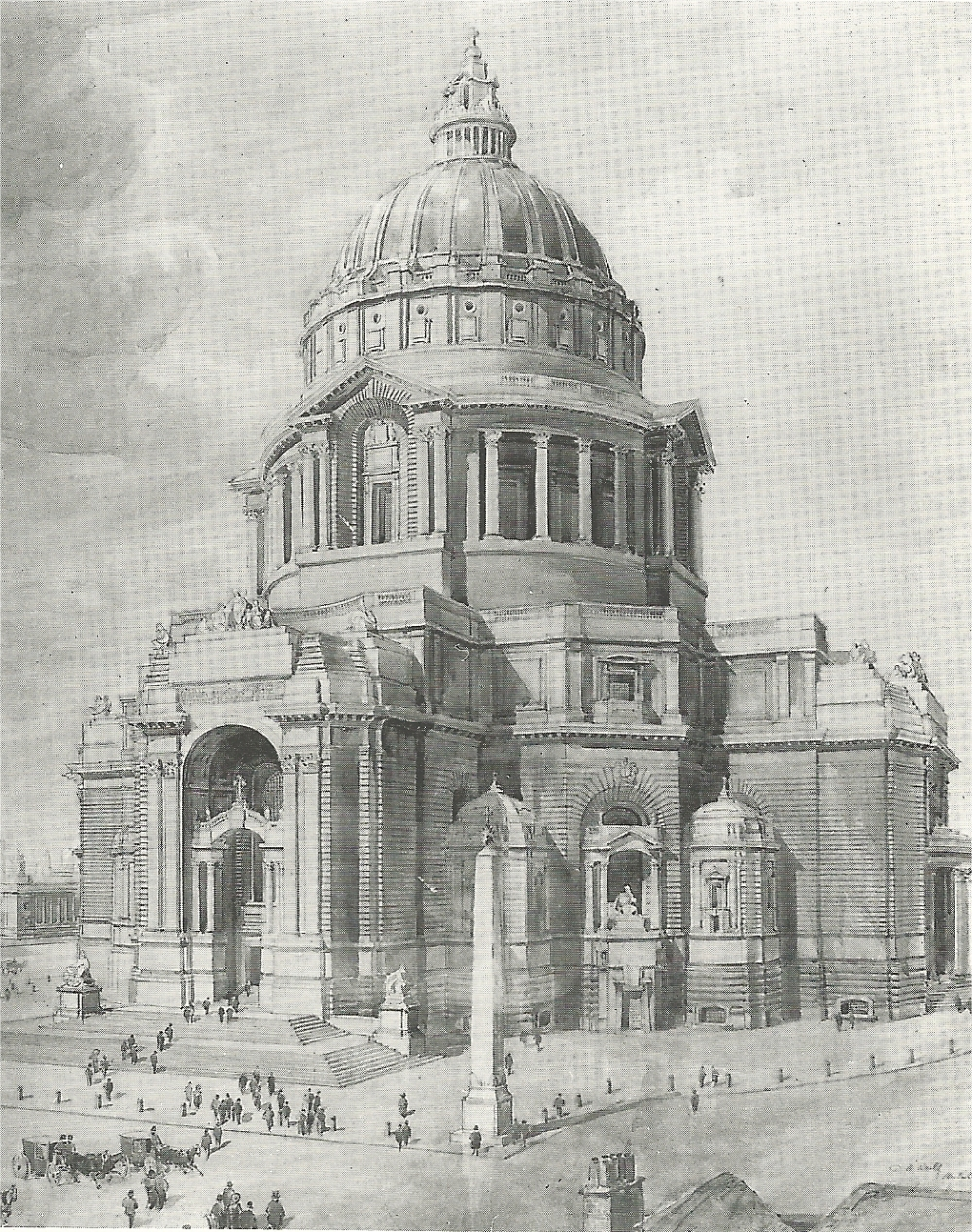
Reilly's 1902 design for Liverpool Cathedral

In 1898, Reilly became an Associate of the Royal Institute of British Architects (RIBA). In 1900 he applied for the chair of architecture at King's College, London; he had not seriously expected to be successful and was surprised and pleased to reach the final shortlist of three. The successful candidate, Ravenscroft Elsey Smith, appointed him to a part-time lectureship and introduced him to Stanley Peach, who specialised in designing power stations. Peach and Reilly entered into a joint practice. According to Reilly, Peach was "a good constructor, but diffident about his own powers of design. The result was that he tried far too hard to dress up his engineering buildings, with their fine roofs and great chimneys, with 'architecture' when they would have been much better left alone." Reilly, on the other hand, was more interested in design than in the mechanics of construction.

In 1902, Reilly applied unsuccessfully for the chair of architecture at University College, London. In the same year he entered the open competition for the design of the proposed new Liverpool Cathedral. He detested the Victorian Neo-Gothic style, describing the work of a leading proponent, Alfred Waterhouse, as having the "colours of mud and blood". His proposed design was in the English Neo-Classical style, with a large central dome in the tradition of Wren's St Paul's. The assessors of the competition were G F Bodley, a leading exponent of the Gothic style, and Norman Shaw. Reilly's design was one of eight highly commended entries that failed to gain inclusion in the final shortlist of five; it was the only classical design among them. Giles Gilbert Scott's Gothic design was the eventual winner, but Reilly had made influential contacts in Liverpool, where much of his career came to be centred. (Note: Although generally averse to neo-Gothic architecture, Reilly regarded Scott's Liverpool Cathedral as "a really great building".)

=== Liverpool University ===
In the years before and after the turn of the century, architecture in Britain was dominated by an exclusive set of affluent partnerships. Aspiring architects who could afford to buy an articled pupillage in one of the leading firms had an enormous advantage. In an attempt to offer an alternative route into the profession, the University College of Liverpool, the forerunner of Liverpool University, set up a degree course in architecture in 1894. The first professor was Frederick Moore Simpson, a proponent of the Arts and Crafts style of building, which Reilly regarded as "a partial but insufficient remedy for Victorian failure."

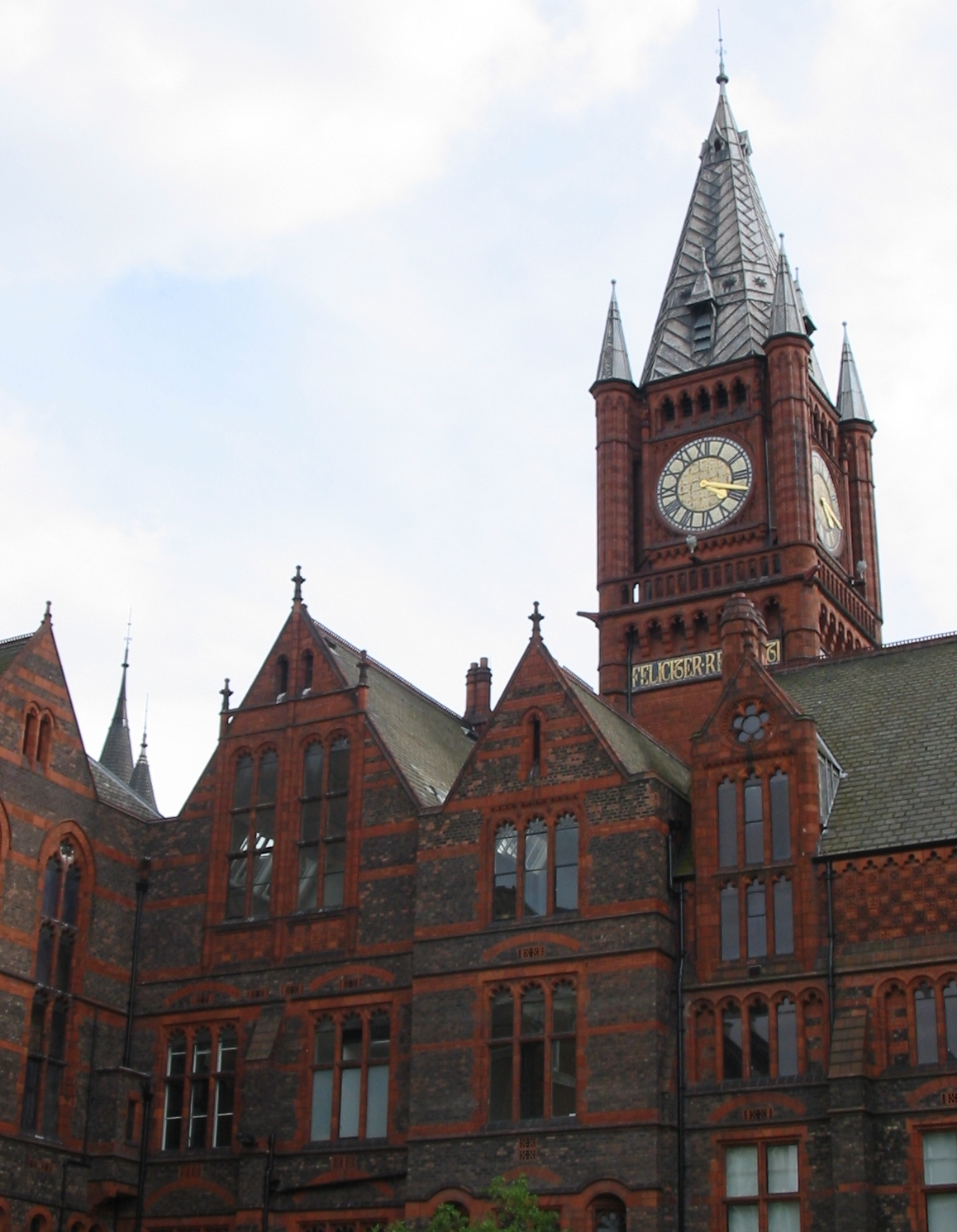
"The colours of mud and blood" Liverpool's Waterhouse building

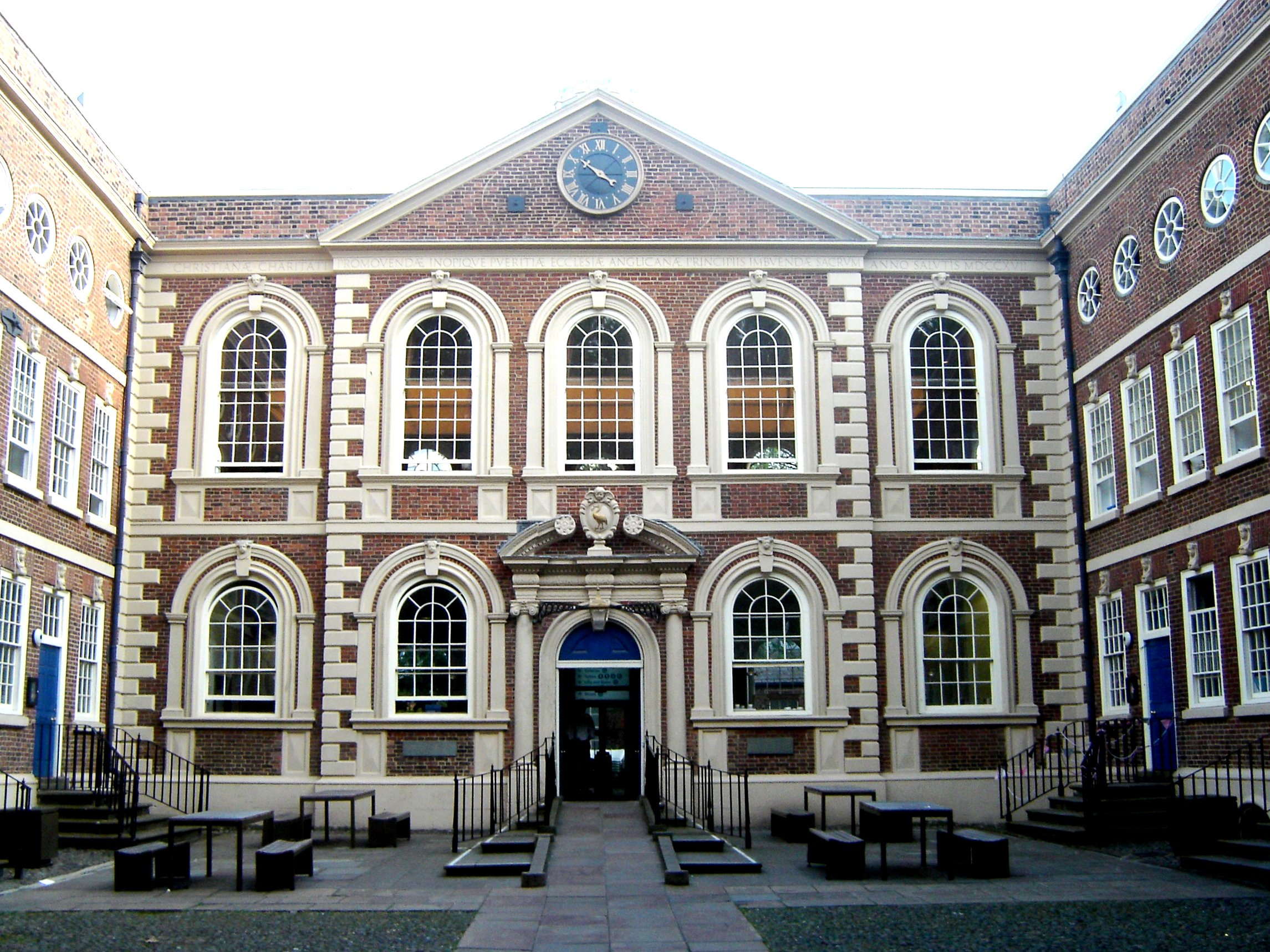
Reilly's department relocated to the Bluecoat Chambers

In 1904, Reilly was invited to succeed Simpson as Roscoe Professor of Architecture at Liverpool. He held the post for 29 years, retiring in 1933. In 1904 he was lecturing to classes of 11 students, mostly drawn from Liverpool and its environs. He built up the annual intake over the years of his tenure; The Times obituarist wrote "In the ten years up to the 1914–18 war he made the Liverpool School of Architecture a thriving and influential institution to which students would come from the ends of the earth". Reilly lengthened the course to five years, and secured for his students exemption from the RIBA's intermediate examination, and later (1920) from its final examination also. He founded the degrees of Bachelor and Master of Architecture. He was supportive of women studying architecture, and Norah Dunphy, the first woman in the UK to graduate in architecture did so while he was head of school.

The main building of the university, in which Reilly was at first based, was designed by his bête noir, Waterhouse. Reilly described it as having "glazed tiles the colour of curry powder". He successfully manoeuvred to have his department moved to the spacious Bluecoat Chambers, an outstanding Queen Anne building in the heart of Liverpool. (Note: During the School of Architecture's occupancy, the building was officially known as "Liberty Buildings") The building had been in danger of demolition, and in working to save it Reilly found an ally in the philanthropic industrialist William Lever.

Lever sponsored a fact-finding trip to the US that Reilly made in 1909. New American neo-classic architecture at that time derived in large measure from the École des Beaux-Arts in Paris; Stamp characterises it as "rooted in the classical tradition [but] essentially modern." The restrained American style of Beaux-Arts classicism made a deep impression on Reilly, as did the methods of teaching he encountered in American architectural colleges.

=== Town planning and civic design ===
Part of Reilly's brief from Lever in his US trip was to study the American approach to the practice and teaching of town planning. Hitherto, little systematic town planning had taken place in English cities; new developments were haphazard and uncoordinated with one another. Lever's view, which Reilly shared, was that planning was simply "architecture on a big scale".

With Lever's encouragement and generous financial backing, Reilly persuaded the University to establish a Department of Civic Design within the School of Architecture. The University authorities accepted Reilly's recommendation that the first Professor of Civic Design should be Stanley Adshead, a fellow-classicist and friend from his days in Belcher's practice. The importance of the work of the Liverpool School was quickly recognised within the architectural profession. Reilly was invited to join the RIBA's Board of Architectural Education in 1906, and he was elected to the Council of the RIBA in 1909.

In 1911, Reilly and Adshead led the opposition to a plan by Norman Shaw and the sculptor W Goscombe John to remodel the south front of St George's Hall in Liverpool. Shaw and John proposed to install a grandiose flight of entrance steps, flanked by equestrian statues in tribute to the recently dead King Edward VII. Reilly regarded the plan as an Edwardian Baroque subversion of the hall's "pure and sublime neo-classical concept". He remarked sarcastically, "What was the use of a great monumental building if it could not be used as a background to a man on a horse?" Shaw enlisted the support of Aston Webb, John Belcher, Hamo Thornycroft and Reginald Blomfield, but Reilly and Adshead won, and the scheme was abandoned.

=== Neo-classicism ===
Although Reilly objected to the more baroque aspects of the Beaux-Arts school, many of his precepts were based on what he believed to be Beaux-Arts principles. Stamp argues that Reilly's concept of Beaux-Arts was filtered through its American practitioners, and put too much emphasis on classical design. The architectural historian Alan Powers writes:

Reilly and other British admirers of the Ecole des Beaux Arts in Paris misinterpreted what they saw as being a system based on classicism, rather than a rationalist system whose principal manifestations were classical. The difference may seem subtle, but is nonetheless crucial, for as the Liverpool School developed under Reilly the specific style he liked to call "Monumental Classic" became an end in itself rather than the means to the abstract end that it had been at the outset.

Fashion in British architecture changed rapidly in the first quarter of the 20th century. Victorian Gothic was rejected, and Charles Rennie Mackintosh found his Scottish version of Art Nouveau outmoded. The architectural historian Gavin Stamp writes:

[A] taste for American classicism, for grand, steel-framed palazzi by McKim, Mead & White or Carrere & Hastings, brought the fashion for Mackintosh's own Scottish brand of the Jugendstil to an end, resulting in personal collapse, the termination of his partnership with Honeyman and Keppie, and exile from his native city. By the 1920s, former students of the Glasgow School of Architecture were designing large banks and insurance buildings which would have been suitable for the streets of Montreal or Detroit."

Mackintosh blamed Reilly for this: "Nor will there be any daylight until it is impossible for pompous bounders like a well-known (at least well advertised) professor at Liverpool to have any say in architectural education. He is teaching efficiency, but even there he is only a 23rd rater because they do it already better in America." Mackintosh complained of Reilly's buildings with "cows' skulls, ill-formed babies with vegetable tails" and dismissed Reilly as "crushed with official recognition and journalistic approval."

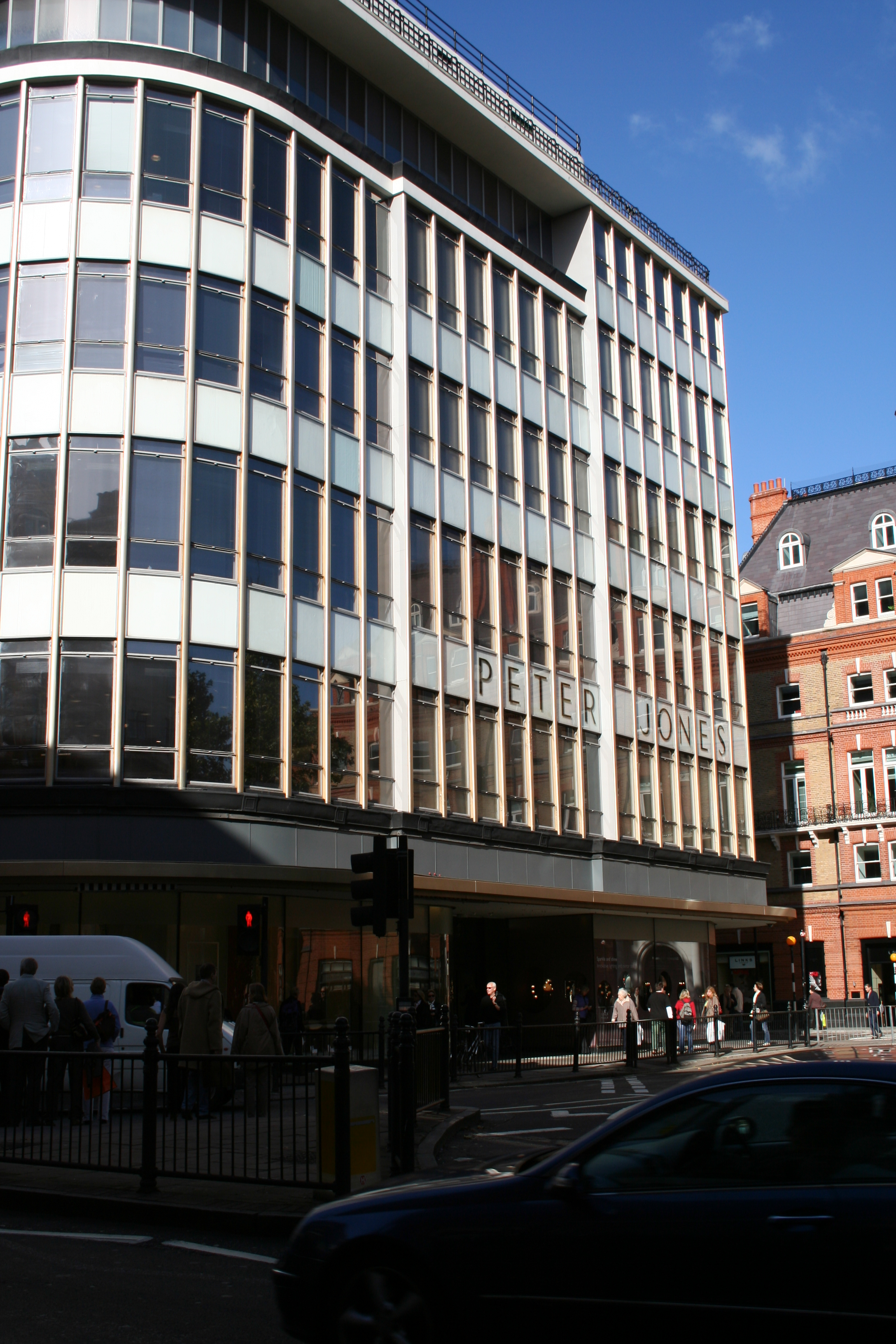
Reilly was consultant architect for the modernist Peter Jones store, 1934.

Despite Mackintosh's animadversions, Reilly was willing to find merit in architectural work of other styles than his own. In a 1931 volume, Representative British Architects of the Present Day, he devoted chapters not only to kindred spirits such as Adshead, but to a Gothic revivalist, Walter Tapper, and an Arts and Crafts advocate, Guy Dawber; others included were Herbert Baker, Blomfield, Clough Williams-Ellis, Edwin Lutyens, and Scott. The Times Literary Supplement observed, "No praise can be too high for the way in which the special aptitudes of the particular architects are brought forward and illustrated from their works."

=== Later years ===
By 1938, in the view of The Times Literary Supplement, the Liverpool School of Architecture was "possibly … the most important centre of architectural education in the world." Later in his career, Reilly moved away from an exclusive classicism. Advances in building techniques and materials and the construction of taller and wider buildings in cities made neo-classicism unsustainable. Reilly's pupil Maxwell Fry recalled being dismayed in 1928 at seeing classical stone facings being hung on the steel frame of a huge block in London, to which Reilly was consultant architect. Fry embraced modernism, and his former teacher later followed him.

In 1934, another Reilly pupil, William Crabtree, designed the modernist Peter Jones building in Sloane Square, with Reilly as consultant architect. Stamp suggests that Reilly may have come to regret his exclusive promotion of classicism at Liverpool; he quotes a letter from Reilly to Giles Gilbert Scott in 1942: "The Liverpool fellows in my time did all go through the discipline of classical architecture. Except for the precision of its rules, I wish now it had been Gothic, for Gothic with its constructional basis is much nearer to modern stuff with its steel and ferroconcrete."

Reilly died in London at the age of 73. His wife predeceased him. He was survived by a daughter and a son, Paul Reilly, a leading designer.

== Honours and legacy ==
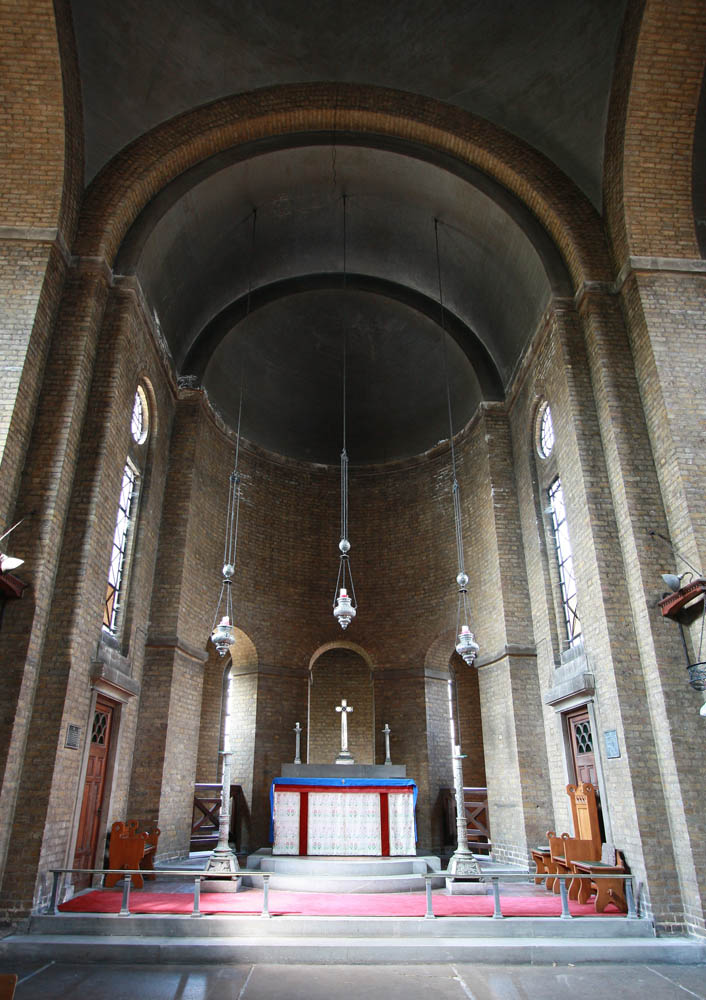
St Barnabas, Shacklewell, Reilly's favourite of his own buildings

Reilly was appointed Member of the Faculty of Architecture at the British School in Rome in 1911, and the following year was made Fellow of the RIBA. In 1925, he was appointed Corresponding Member of the American Institute of Architects. He was appointed Vice-President of the RIBA in 1931. In 1934, after his retirement, he was appointed Emeritus Professor at the University of Liverpool. He was awarded the Royal Gold Medal for Architecture in 1943 and in 1944 was knighted.

As a practising architect, Reilly was responsible for only a handful of buildings. They include cottages at Lower Road, Port Sunlight, for Lever (1905); Liverpool Students' Union (1909); the Church of St Barnabas, Shacklewell, London (1909); and war memorials at Accrington (1920) and Durham (1928). Of these, Reilly's professional colleagues regarded the Students' Union building as his most characteristic work, but he himself preferred St Barnabas, and said that it was "the building I should like to be remembered by, if any."

Reilly was joint architect, with Thomas Hastings, of Devonshire House, Piccadilly, London (1923). He collaborated with his former pupils Lionel Budden and J. E. Marshall on the Leverhulme Building for the Liverpool School of Architecture (1933) and an extension to the Liverpool Students' Union (1935). He was consultant architect for the new buildings for the Peter Jones and John Lewis department stores in London, for which the principal architect was Crabtree, another former pupil.

== Bibliography ==
- Some Liverpool Streets and Buildings in 1921. Liverpool: Liverpool Daily Post & Mercury. 1921. OCLC 504795181.
- McKim, Mead & White. New York: C. Scribner's Sons. 1924. OCLC 187404820.
- Some Manchester Streets and their Buildings. Liverpool: Liverpool University Press. 1924. OCLC 35299280.
- Some Architectural Problems of To-day. Liverpool: Liverpool University Press. 1924. OCLC 5023618.
- Representative British Architects of the Present Day. London: B.T. Batsford. 1931. OCLC 717894687.
- The Theory and Practice of Architecture. London: Victor Gollancz. 1932. OCLC 21131952.
- The Body of the Town – Roscoe Lecture for 1934. Liverpool: E. A. Bryant. 1934. OCLC 504795157.
- Scaffolding in the Sky – A Semi-Architectural Autobiography. London: G. Routledge & Sons. 1938. OCLC 5290945.
- Architecture as a Communal Art. London: B.T. Batsford for the Council for Education in Appreciation of Physical Environment. 1944. OCLC 70727148.
- Outline Plan for the County Borough of Birkenhead. Birkenhead: County Borough of Birkenhead. 1947. OCLC 25422878.

== Notes and references ==
Notes

Sources

- Reilly, Charles (1931). Representative British architects of the present day. London: B.T. Batsford. OCLC 717894687.
- Reilly, Charles (1938). Scaffolding in the Sky – A Semi-Architectural Autobiography. London: G. Routledge & Sons. OCLC 5290945.
- Sharples, Joseph, ed. (1996). Charles Reilly & the Liverpool School of Architecture 1904–1933. Liverpool: Liverpool University Press. ISBN 0-85323-901-0.
- Powers, Alan. Sharples, Joseph (ed.). Liverpool and Architectural Education in the Early Twentieth Century. pp. 1–23.
- Sharples, Joseph. Sharples, Joseph (ed.). Charles Herbert Reilly. pp. ix–x.
- Sharples, Joseph. Sharples, Joseph (ed.). Reilly and his Students, on Merseyside and Beyond. pp. 25–42.
- Sharples, Joseph. Sharples, Joseph (ed.). Catalogue of Exhibits and Biographies of Architects. pp. 63–180.
- Shippobottom, Michael. Sharples, Joseph (ed.). C.H. Reilly and the First Lord Leverhulme. pp. 43–62.
