= William Curtis Green =

English architect (1875–1960)

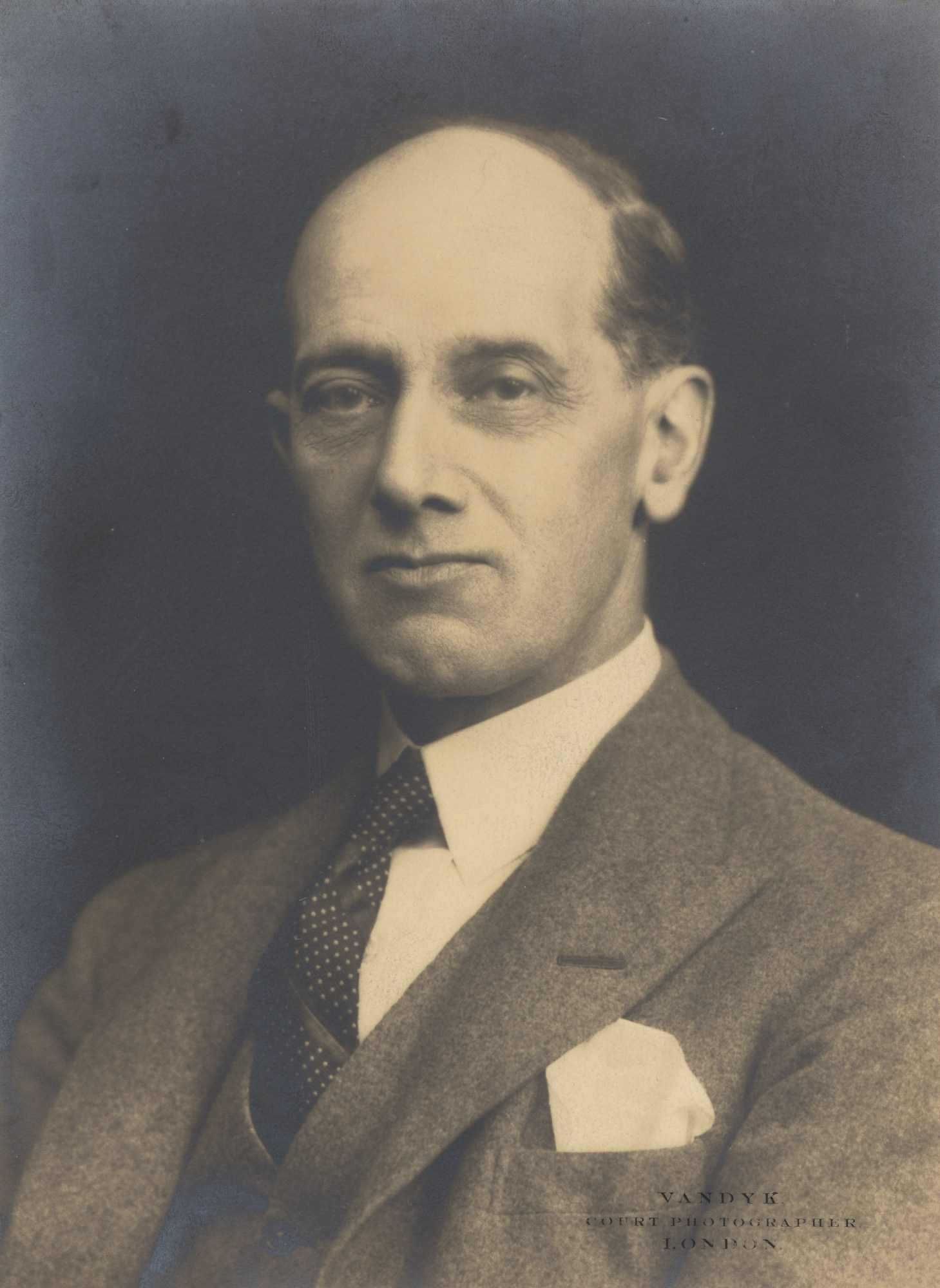
Green (unknown date)

William Curtis Green RA, FRIBA (16 July 1875 – 26 March 1960) was an English architect, designer and barrister who was based in London for much of his career. His works include the Dorchester Hotel, Wolseley House, New Scotland Yard, and the buildings, including the former Manor House, in Stockgrove Country Park. He was awarded the Royal Gold Medal in 1942. Around 20 of his designs are listed buildings. He was the younger brother of the craftsman and furniture designer Arthur Romney Green.

Born in Hampshire, Curtis Green studied architecture in West Bromwich and Birmingham. He became articled to John Belcher and trained at the Royal Academy Schools. Curtis Green took up his own practice in 1898 and was soon in demand. His first commissions included several power stations and small houses. He became an Associate Member of the Royal Academy of Arts in 1903 and won a first prize in the Romford Garden Suburb exhibition in 1910.

In 1921 he designed 160 Piccadilly for the Wolseley Motor Company, for which he was awarded a RIBA bronze medal. Several years later, he was commissioned by Barclays Bank to build several offices. He was elected as an associate of the Royal Academy in 1923, and became a full academician ten years later. He died in London in 1960 aged 84.

== Early life ==
Curtis Green was born in Alton, Hampshire, and was the second son to Fredric Green, a barrister, and his wife Maria Heath Curtis. His elder brother, Arthur, was a craftsman and furniture designer who had his own workshop in Christchurch, Hampshire. William was educated at Newton College, Devon, and studied mechanical engineering, an industry in which he intended to work, at West Bromwich Technical School. On advice of his principle at West Bromwich, he took up architectural studies at the Birmingham School of Art. From there, he became articled to John Belcher and trained at the Royal Academy School under R. Phené Spiers. Green joined the staff of The Builder in 1897, briefly, and visited many countries in order to develop his skills in architecture. He became an Associate Member of the Royal Academy of Arts in 1903.

== Career ==
=== Early years ===
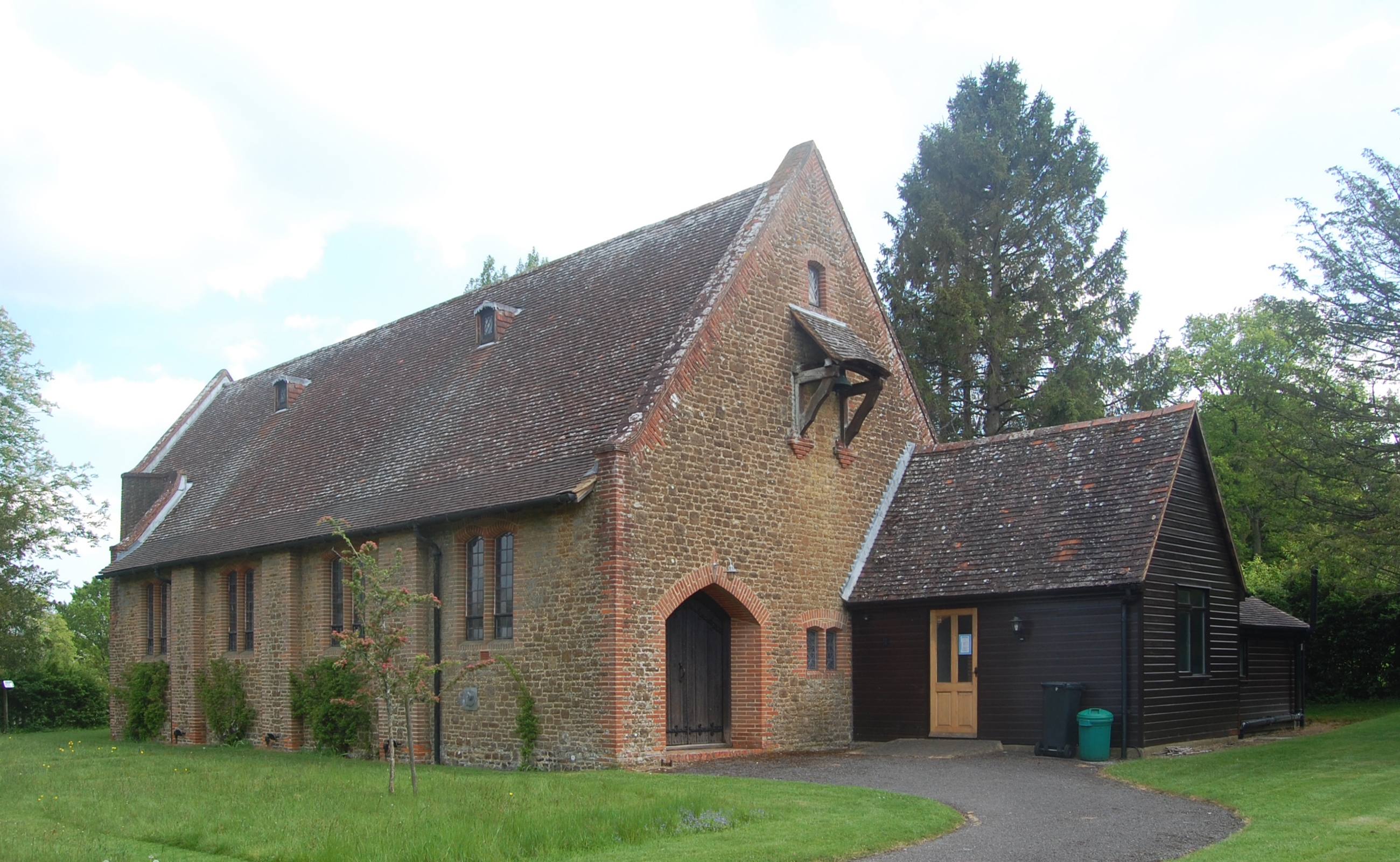
Church of the Good Shepherd, Dockenfield (1910)

Curtis Green took up his own practice in 1898; his first projects included the exteriors of several power stations, including the Tramway Generating Station in Bristol (1899), which Historic England described as being the finest out of these commissions. He also designed the building used for the Painswick Institute in 1907. He was elected fellow of the Royal Institute of British Architects (RIBA) two years later.

In 1910, the same year in which he designed the Church of the Good Shepherd in Dockenfield on the Surrey/Hampshire border, Curtis Green went into partnership with London-based architects Dunn & Watson who frequently left him in charge of the practice. The same year, a request was made by the House and Cottage Exhibition Committee at Gidea Park, headed by the Liberal Member of parliament John Burns, for architects to take part in a new house-building competition. The object was "to provide families with a well-built, modern home, regardless of class or status", and "to bring the towns into the country, and the country into the towns", but it was also a chance for competing architects to showcase their talents. Curtis Green designed two properties for the competition; one, a Class II cottage, and a Class I house, 43 Heath Drive, for which he received £25 for the garden design. When his friend Edwin Lutyens went to New Delhi to build the Rashtrapati Bhavan in 1912, he asked Curtis Green to take charge of his office while he was away. The opportunity allowed Curtis Green to build upon his understanding of how to conduct large works in a grand manner.

In 1927 Barclays Bank commissioned Curtis Green to design a series of buildings for them, starting with the conversion of 160 Piccadilly, which he had designed seven years previously for the Wolseley Motor Company, and for which, in 1922, he was awarded a RIBA bronze medal. At around the same time as the construction of 160 Piccadilly, Curtis Green was asked by the National Westminster to build them a new Piccadilly branch, which was to be located directly opposite. Situated on a corner plot, like his neighbouring project, it too was built of Portland stone. (Note: Although admiring of Curtis' Wolseley showroom, Pevsner suggests that "the palm must go to his more original National Westminster Bank across the way".) Other structures in Piccadilly followed, including the Westminster Bank in 1926, Stratton House (1929), 6 King Street, and the London Life Association building in King William Street.

In 1919 he established a partnership with his son, Christopher, and his son-in-law Antony Lloyd. Among their many buildings include the Church of All Saints in Shirley, Croydon, Their offices were based at 5 Pickering Place, St. James's Street, London.

Curtis Green was elected as an associate of the Royal Academy in 1923, and became a full academician ten years later.

=== Later years ===
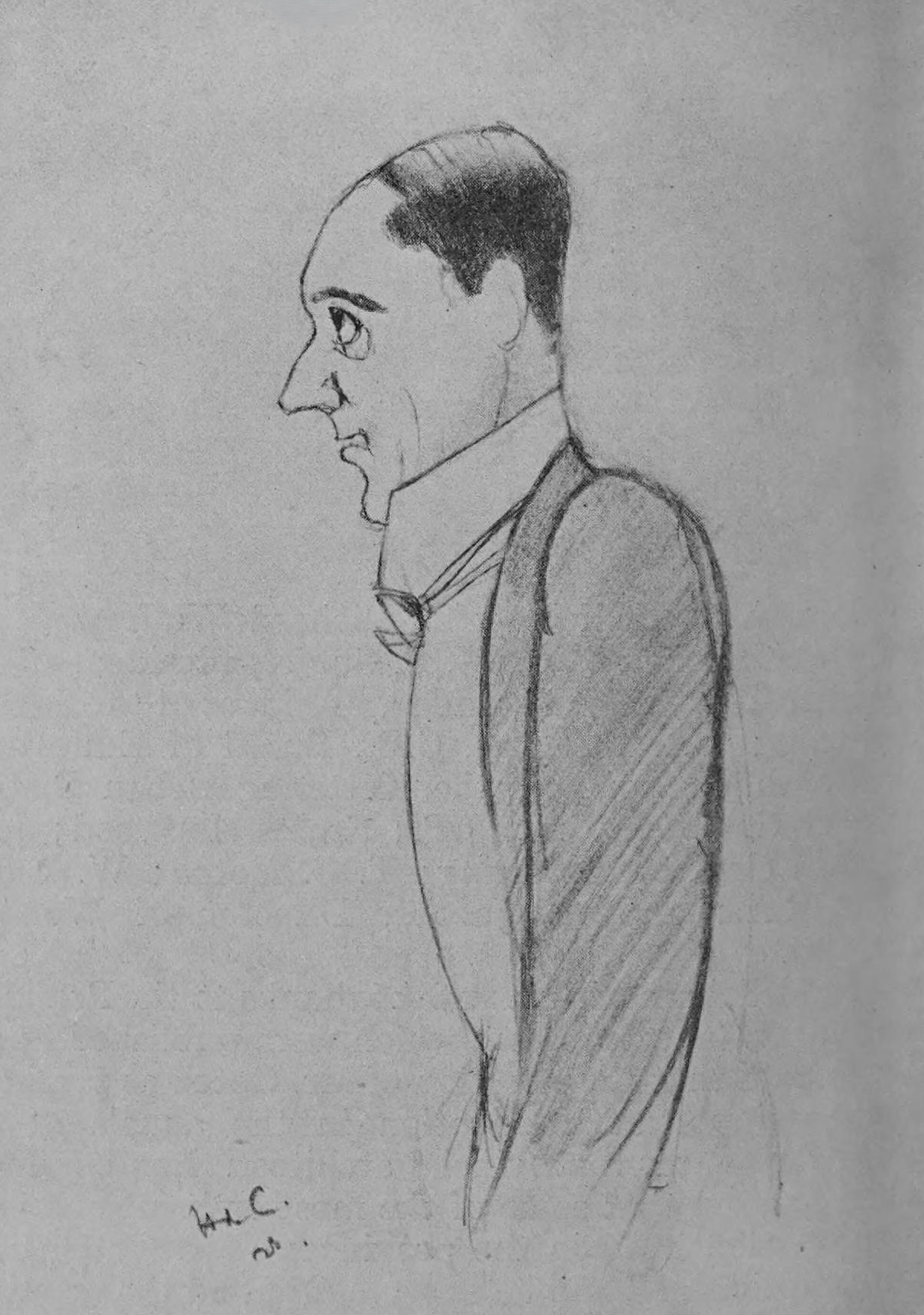
Cartoon of Green drawn by H. de C. Hastings

During the last years of his career, Curtis Green allowed his son-in-law and son to conduct most of the work which he would oversee. He was instructed to build a new annex for Scotland Yard in 1935, which finished five years later. The building was constructed as a third building and an extension to the existing New Scotland Yard building, At around this time, Curtis Green also designed the Equity and Law Life Assurance Society building in Lincoln's Inn Fields (1936–7).

But it was his design of the Dorchester Hotel in Park Lane that, according to his biographer, Hubert Worthington, was his best-known building. The Dorchester came about under unusual and difficult circumstances for Curtis Green: the building was initially started by Owen Williams, and had three different architects shortly after, before Curtis Green was asked to take it on. Restricted by the already established foundations, and with just 14 months to complete the design and build, he adapted to the awkward layout and made a success of the project.

The success of the Dorchester led to a further hotel commission for Curtis Green, the Queen's Hotel, Leeds.

In 1942 Green was awarded the Royal Gold Medal of the Royal Institute of British Architects and was chairman of RIBA's board of architectural education. He was appointed as the president of the Architectural Association, a member of the Royal Fine Arts Commission, and an officer of the Académie Française. He served the Artists' General Benevolent Institution for 38 years.

== Retirement and death ==
Curtis Green died at his address, 16-17 Pall Mall, London, on 26 March 1960. The building, the former Scottish Provident Institution, is one that he had helped design in 1913, alongside William Newton Dunn (1859—1934) and Robert Watson (1865–1916).

A memorial to Curtis Green lies within St James's Church, Piccadilly. His estate was worth £93,921. (Note: £93,921 in 1960 equates to (£1,881,980 in 2025 adjusted for inflation).) His son, Christopher, and son-in-law, Antony Lloyd, continued the family practice, Green, Lloyd and Adams, after Curtis Green's death.

== Personal life ==
Curtis Green married twice; the first being to Cicely Dillworth née Lloyd (c.1872–1934) at Lichfield Cathedral on 19 October 1899. They had a son, Christopher (b. 1900), and four daughters, Cicely Alice (b. 1902); Margaret Elizabeth (b. 1904); Joan Priscilla (b. 1907); and Agnes Mary (b. 1910). Cicely was a member of the Crossfield family who were prominent Quakers headed by Theodore Crossfield and for whom Curtis Green designed the Society of Friends Hall (now Adult School Hall) in Croydon in 1908.

Soon after Cicely's death in 1934, Curtis Green met Laura Gwenllian James née Rice (c.1874–1952), whom he married on 2 August 1935 at Lambeth Palace. James was the widow of the third Lord Northbourne and daughter of Admiral Sir Ernest Rice.

Among Curtis Green's grandchildren were the architect Jeremy Sampson (Sam) Lloyd (1930–2009) and the artist and designer Elizabeth Jane Lloyd (1928–1995). Sam Lloyd carried on the Lloyd Green and Adams business after the retirement of his father, Antony, in 1970. Curtis Green's great-grandson, Michael, is a furniture restorer, currently based in Battersea, South West London.

== Notes, references and sources ==
Notes

Sources

- Bradley, Simon; Pevsner, Nikolaus (2003). London 6: Westminster. The Buildings of England. Newhaven, US and London: Yale University Press. ISBN 0-300-09595-3.
- Nairn, Ian; Pevsner, Nikolaus (1971) [1962]. The Buildings of England: Surrey (2nd ed.). Harmondsworth: Penguin Books. ISBN 0-300-09675-5.
