= John Butler (architect) =

English architect

John Butler (1828 – 1900) was a British architect who was the Chief Architect and Surveyor to the Metropolitan Police in London between 1881 and 1895.

In the 1880s the number of police stations being built surged following political unrest and high-profile events such as the Whitechapel Murders.

Upon his appointment he undertook a survey of the police estate and replaced a lot of the buildings he found to be inadequate. His designs were influenced by the Queen Anne architectural style used by Richard Norman Shaw with whom he worked on the design of Scotland Yard between 1887 and 1890.

Butler was the fourth architect to hold the role of chief surveyor to the Metropolitan Police from its inception in 1842. (Note: The post of Surveyor to the Metropolitan Police has been held by ten people since its establishment in 1842: Charles Reeves (1842–1866); Thomas Charles Sorby (1867–8); Frederick Caiger (1868–81); John Butler (1881–95); John Dixon Butler (1895–1920); Gilbert Mackenzie Trench (1921–47); John Innes Elliott (1947–74); M. Belchamber (1974–88); T. Lawrence (1988–2002); A. Croney (2002–?).) He took over from Frederick Caiger, who'd held the role since 1868, and was succeeded by his son, John Dixon Butler, upon his retirement in 1895.

== Known buildings ==
Station	Image	Date	Notes
Wandsworth Police Station		1883	Located at 146 High Street, Wandsworth. It is the second oldest operational building in the Metropolitan Police's estate, after Kentish Town Police Station.
Bushey Police Station		1883	Located at 43 Sparrows Herne, Bushey. Internally the building had a charging office, a Court, three cells and two married quarters. The building was designated as a Grade II listed building in 1985. The Metropolitan Police transferred control of Bushey to Hertfordshire Constabulary in 2000. The station closed in 2011 and was converted into flats.
Chiswick Police Station		1884	Located at 210, High Road, Chiswick. It was closed in 1963 and a new station was built opposite, designed by John Innes Elliott. The old station became a public house in 1974 and is now (2026) called "The Hound".
Beckenham Police Station		1885	Located at 45 High Street, Beckenham. Closed in 2010; as of 2025, the building is being used as a spa and a restaurant.
Tottenham Police Station		1885	Located at St Ann's Road, Tottenham, junction with Hermitage Way. Closed in 2001 and developed into flats. The original facade remains.
Wanstead Police Station		1886	Located in Spratt Hall Road, Wanstead. Closed in 2013 and sold the following year. Developed into flats. The building remains and includes original features, including cells and Hayloft.
New Scotland Yard (North building)		1887	Butler assisted Richard Norman Shaw with the design of the north building between 1887 and 1890. An extension was added to the south in 1902, under the supervision of his son, John Dixon Butler, with Shaw as consultant. The police occupied both buildings before moving out in 1967 and into a building in nearby Broadway. The north and south buildings now form part of the parliamentary estate.
Forest Gate Police Station		1888	Funded by donations from residents of the Woodgrange Estate to combat the throwing of bricks at windows. Sold by the MPS in the 1990s when the new police station opened further down Romford Road on the junction of Green Street in 1992. Derelict in 2005 and demolished thereafter.
New Southgate Police Station		1889	Located at 138 High Road, Arnos Grove, New Southgate. In December 1960, for a period of six months, the station was one of a few London police stations to be equipped with a public telephone, direct to the police, to see if it could operate without the need for it to be open 24 hours a day. The experiment proved to be effective and by 1968 it was only used as office space. The station closed in 1990 and was redeveloped into flats. The building still exists, as of 2025.
Norwood Green Police Station		1890	Closed in 2008, sold in 2014 and redeveloped. The building no longer survives.
Wandsworth Common Police Station		1890	Located in Trinity Road, Wandsworth Common. It closed as a police station in 1973 and was merged with Earlsfield Police Station in 1974. It was used by police civil staff until October 1985. It closed in 2011 and was sold by the Met in 2012.
Leman Street Police Station		1890	Built in response to the Jack the Ripper murders in 1888, on a site previously occupied by the Garrick Theatre. The new station was built of red brick and had chromatically matching stone dressings. Inside there were offices, examination rooms, living quarters for married officers, and an adjoining cellblock. The station closed in December 1967 and was demolished to make way for the current, much larger police building (1970).
Chadwell Heath Police Station		1892	Closed as a police station in 1969. As of 2025 the building is now a Wetherspoons pub called "The Eva Hart", named after a survivor from the Sinking of the RMS Titanic.
Walthamstow Police Station		1892	Located at 360 Forest Road, Waltham Forest. Closed in 2011 and sold the following year. As of 2025 the building still exists. Its use is unknown.
New Malden Police Station		1892	Located at 184 High Street, New Malden. Closed as a police station in 1998, but remained in police ownership until at least 2004. Now a public house called "The Watchman", operated by Wetherspoons.
Chislehurst Police Station		1893	27 High Street, Chislehurst, London Borough of Bromley. Closed in 1999, now a Ukrainian bar and restaurant.
Peckham Police Station		1893	The station is still operational, making it one of the oldest buildings within the Metropolitan Police estate.
Blackwall River Police Station		1894	Located at Coldharbour, Tower Hamlets.
Bethnal Green Police Station		1894	Located at 458 Bethnal Green Road, Bethnal Green. The building includes work by Butler and his son, who undertook modifications and renovations in 1917. The station closed in 1995 when a new, much larger station was opened in nearby Victoria Park Square the previous year.
Croydon Police Station		1895	Demolished in 1980 to make way for a public park called Queen's Gardens.

== Sources ==
- Bradley, Simon; Pevsner, Nikolaus (2003). London 6: Westminster. The Buildings of England. New Haven, US and London: Yale University Press. ISBN 978-0-300-09595-1. OCLC 844722686.
- Cherry, Bridget; O'Brien, Charles; Pevsner, Nikolaus (2005). London 5: East. The Buildings of England. New Haven, US and London: Yale University Press. ISBN 978-0-300-10701-2. OCLC 1159868585.
- Cherry, Bridget; Pevsner, Nikolaus (2002a). London 2: South. The Buildings of England. Newhaven, US and London: Yale University Press. ISBN 978-0-300-09651-4. OCLC 844260066.
- Cherry, Bridget; Pevsner, Nikolaus (2002b). London 3: North West. The Buildings of England. Newhaven, US and London: Yale University Press. ISBN 978-0-300-09652-1. OCLC 844442257.
- Cherry, Bridget; Pevsner, Nikolaus (2002c). London 4: North. The Buildings of England. Newhaven, US and London: Yale University Press. ISBN 978-0-300-09653-8. OCLC 719418475.
- O'Brien, Charles; Nairn, Ian; Cherry, Bridget (2022). Surrey. The Buildings of England. London: Yale University Press. ISBN 978-0-300-23478-7.
- Moss, Alan; Swinden, David; Kennison, Peter (2021). London 5: East. Behind The Blue Lamp. London: Mango Publishing. ISBN 978-1-914-27724-5.
- Saint, Andrew (2010). Richard Norman Shaw. New Haven, US and London: Yale University Press. ISBN 9-780300-15526-6.
- Sanderson, Eileen (2021). London Police Stations. Stroud, Gloucestershire: Amberley Publishing. ISBN 9-781398-10016-9.
