= Police supervision (disambiguation) =

Police supervision is a form of additional punishment.

Police supervision may also refer to:

- Supervision of police personnel
- Police custody (disambiguation)
- Police surveillance

== See also ==
- Judicial supervision (disambiguation)
