= John Innes Elliott =

British architect

John Innes Elliott (13 November 1912 – 3 December 1989) was a British architect who, for twenty-seven years, was the Chief Architect and Surveyor to the Metropolitan Police in London. He held the post from 1947 until his retirement in 1974. He was the seventh architect to hold the post since its inception in 1842. He took over the role from Gilbert Mackenzie Trench, who retired in 1945. Elliott's designs were carried out in the brutalist style.

== Life and career ==
Born in Liverpool, Elliott trained at the Liverpool School of Architecture between 1930 and 1935, where he was tutored by Lionel Bailey Budden and Charles Herbert Reilly. Elliott gained employment as an architectural assistant to a travel company in Wallasey, which he coincided with his studies. In the late 1930s he worked for the Office of Works in the branch for Ancient Monuments and Historic Buildings. During the war he assisted in the design of post-war housing. In the 1940s he moved to London where he was appointed the surveyor to the Metropolitan Police in 1947, after the retirement of Gilbert Mackenzie Trench two years previously.

Elliott was made a Commander of the Most Excellent Order of the British Empire (CBE) in the 1974 New Year Honours list and retired later that year, having completed his designs for the buildings within Hendon Police College, Colindale.

== Partial list of buildings ==
Name	Photograph	Opened	Notes
Brixton Police Station		1953	Open and operational.
Acton Police Station			Open and operational
Albany Street Police Station		1960	Closed to the public in 2013.
Whetstone Police Station		1960	Closed to the public in 2013. Now a school.
Shoreditch Police Station		1961	4-6 Shepherdess Walk, London Borough of Hackney. Built on the site of a former police station, designed by John Dixon Butler in 1901. As of 2026 the building is still in use by tbe police.
Holborn Police Station		1962	Still in use.
Greenwich Police Station, 31 Royal Hill, Greenwich.		1962	Closed to the public in 2018. Remains operational.
Chadwell Heath Police Station		1962	Closed and sold. Made a religious building in 2014.
Lavender Hill Police Station and Magistrates Court,176 Lavender Hill, Battersea.		1963	Operational
Holloway Police Station, 284 Hornsey Road, Islington.		1965	Closed and sold in 2017.
Enfield Police Station, London Road, Enfield		1965	Remains in operation, as of 2024.
Croydon Police Station		1967	Operational
Brentford Police Station		1967	Closed to the public in 2013.
Finchley Police Station, 193 Ballards Lane, Finchley, London Borough of Barnet		1967	Sold in 2014 for redevelopment. Now flats.
Woodford Police Station		1968	Closed to the public in 2013.
West Ham Police Station		1969	Closed to the public in 2019.
Ponders End Police Station		1969	Sold in 2012, demolished and developed into housing.
Stratford Police Station, West Ham Lane		1969	
Southgate Police Station, 59 Crown Lane, Southgate		1970	Closed in 2014. Redevelopment into flats considered in 2024.
Paddington Green Police Station		1971	
Leman Street Police Station		1971	Closed to the public in 2017, although still operational.
Chiswick Police Station		1972	Closed to the public in 2017.
Hendon Police College		1974	Buildings on the site include the Peel buildings, tower blocks, and traffic garage and driving school. Demolished 2013-14.
Southall Police Station, 1 North Road, Southall.		1975	Designed in 1974/5 by Brewer Smith Brewer Group (BSBG), in association with Innes Elliott. Built by Miller Buckley Construction. Work commenced in 1973. Completed in 1975. Opened by Sir Robert Mark in December 1976. Closed to the public in 2017, but remains operational.

== Sources ==
- Cherry, Bridget; Pevsner, Nikolaus (1998). London 4: North. The Buildings of England. Newhaven, US and London: Yale University Press. ISBN 978-0-300-09653-8. OCLC 719418475.
- Cherry, Bridget; Pevsner, Nikolaus (2002). London 3: North West. The Buildings of England. Newhaven, US and London: Yale University Press. ISBN 978-0-300-09653-8. OCLC 719418475.
- Moss, Alan; Swinden, David; Kennison, Peter (2021). Behind the Blue Lamp. London, England: Blue Lamp Books, Bloomington. ISBN 978-1-914-27724-5. OCLC 1349544326.
- Sanderson, Eileen (2021). London Police Stations. Stroud, Gloucestershire: Amberley Publishing. ISBN 9-781398-10016-9.
