= Paddington Green Police Station =

Metropolitan Police Service station

Coordinates: 51°31′13.5″N 0°10′17.25″W

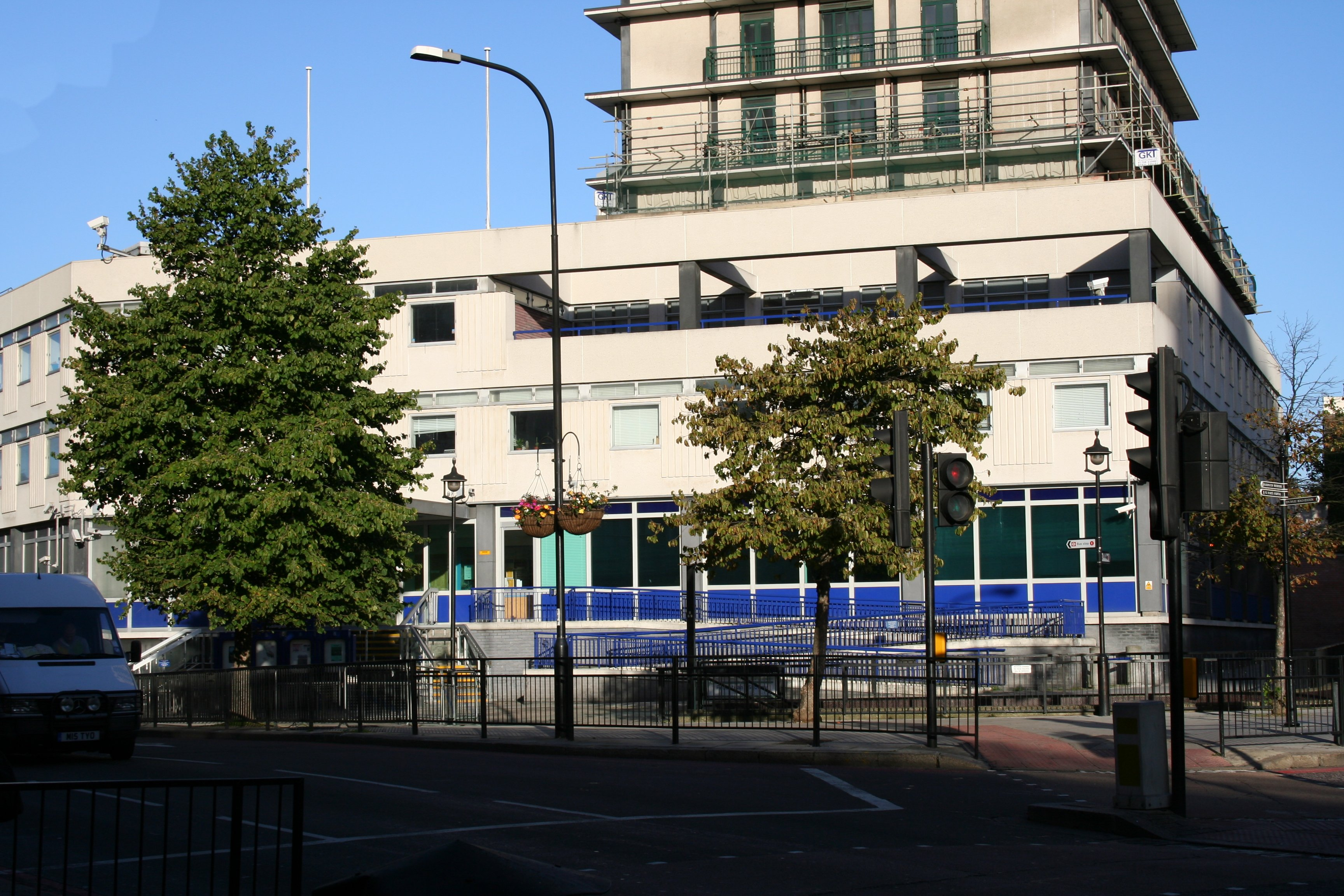

Paddington Green Police Station was a Metropolitan Police Service station located in Paddington, Central London, England, active from 1971 to 2018.

== History ==
The building was designed by John Innes Elliott and was completed in 1971. As well as providing local services, the station was used as an interrogation centre for prisoners suspected of terrorism. Underneath the station were sixteen cells located below ground level, which had a separate custody suite from the building's other cells.

High-profile terrorist suspects arrested across the UK were often taken to Paddington Green Police Station for interrogation, and holding until escorted to a court of law. Suspects who have been held there include members of the IRA, the British nationals released from Guantanamo Bay, and the 21 July 2005 London bombers.

On 10 October 1992, an IRA bomb exploded in a phone box outside the police station, injuring one person.

== Refurbishment ==
In 2007, a joint parliamentary human rights committee stated that the old and decrepit police station was "plainly inadequate" to hold such high-risk prisoners. Lord Carlile, the official reviewer of the government's terrorism laws, said the Metropolitan Police needed a new custody suite suitable for up to 30 terrorism suspects. The old cells were 12-foot square, contained no windows and were reportedly too hot in the summer and too cold in winter.

Refurbishments were made in 2009 at a cost of £490,000. In later years, suspects had access to an audio-visual system on which they could watch films and listen to music whilst incarcerated. This system was added because it was deemed inhumane to keep people locked up for up to 28 days without any stimulation. The cells were lined with brown paper before suspects arrive so that any traces of explosives found on their bodies can be proven not to have been picked up from the cells.

== Closure ==
The station closed in late 2018.

In February 2020, the closed station was occupied by anarchist group the Green Anti-Capitalist Front, who said they intended to turn the space into a community centre. They discovered that the police station was being used for police firearms training, which had to be rescheduled.

In September 2024 the demolition of the former Police Station was completed.
