= Architect and Surveyor to the Metropolitan Police =

The post of Architect and Surveyor to the Metropolitan Police was created in London, England in 1842 and renamed Chief Architect and Surveyor to the Metropolitan Police in 1949. It was held by only nine people, five of whom served for over twenty years each. The force's first purpose-built station had been built at Bow Street in 1831, only two years after Sir Robert Peel's Metropolitan Police Act of 1829.

== List ==
- 1842 - Richard Fletcher
- 1843–1866 - Charles Reeves
- 1867–1868 - Thomas Charles Sorby
- 1868–1881 - Frederick Henry Caiger
- 1881–1895 – John Butler
- 1895–1920 - John Dixon Butler
- 1920–1947 - Gilbert Mackenzie Trench (Note: Also the designer of the Metropolitan Police box which was subsequently the inspiration for the TARDIS.)
- 1947–1974 - John Innes Elliott
- 1974–1988 - Michael Louis Belchamber
- 1988–? - T. Lawrence
