= Royal Mile police box =

Architectural structure in City of Edinburgh, Scotland

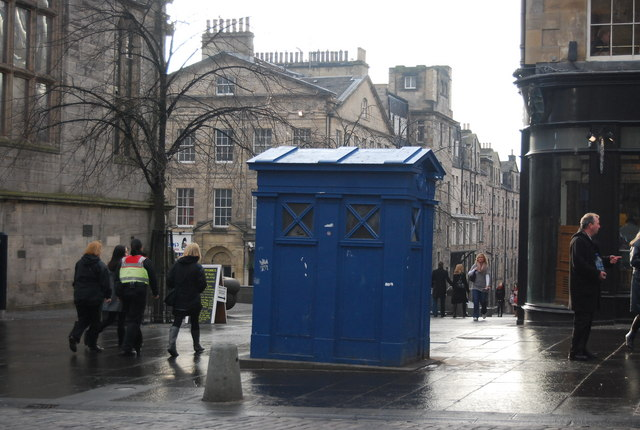
Royal Mile Police Box before it was purchased in 2012

The Royal Mile Police Box, located on the Royal Mile in the City of Edinburgh, is the most valuable police box in the United Kingdom, and one of the most expensive pieces of real estate in Europe per square foot.

== Design ==
The police box (along with others in Edinburgh) was designed by City Architect Ebenezer MacRae, and manufactured by Carron Ironworks in Falkirk. The new network of police boxes was formally commissioned by the Chief Constable and other dignitaries in 1933. All of the MacRae police boxes featured klaxons and blue flashing lights to alert constables to an incoming message, but the Royal Mile box uniquely featured a "sky lantern", a remote blue lamp mounted at high level on the street corner of North Bridge and Royal Mile, so as to attract attention across a wider area.

== Disposal ==
Following a general sale of all police boxes (with just one exception) by Police Scotland, the Royal Mile box was purchased in 2012 by entrepreneur Kit Fraser for £102,000, and has since been converted into a ticket booth operated by City of Edinburgh Tours.
