= Judicial supervision =

Judicial supervision may refer to:

- Judicial supervision (France), a form of punishment in French criminal law
- Judicial supervision (Soviet Union), a form of judicial review in Soviet law

== See also ==
- Judicial review, the power of the judiciary to review executive and legislative decisions
- Police supervision (disambiguation)
