= Independent custody visitor =

An independent custody visitor is someone who visits people who are detained in police stations in the United Kingdom to ensure that they are being treated properly. Prisoner escort and custody lay observers carry out a similar function in relation to the escort of prisoners from one place to another, or their custody at court.

Custody visiting originated from recommendations of the Scarman Report into the 1981 Brixton riots. Initially, the provision of custody visiting was voluntary on the part of the police authorities, but it was placed on a statutory basis in 2002.

== Custody visitors ==
=== Statutory basis ===
In England and Wales, custody visitors are appointed by police authorities who are required, now by the Police Reform Act 2002, to make arrangements for custody visiting to take place. However the Act makes it clear that custody visitors are independent of both the police authority and the Chief Constable of the police force. The Act is supplemented by a code of practice made by the Home Secretary, which sets out in more detail how custody visiting should work. In Northern Ireland, a similar arrangement is in place under the Police (Northern Ireland) Act 2000. There is no statutory scheme in Scotland, however all the police boards in Scotland operate a non-statutory scheme under guidance issued by the Scottish Government.

=== Visits to police stations ===
Visits to police stations by custody visitors are unannounced and can be made at any time. The custody visitors must be admitted to the custody suite immediately, unless there is a dangerous situation occurring. They are allowed to speak to anyone being detained at the police station, unless a police Inspector (or higher rank) believes that access would place the custody visitors in danger or would "interfere with the process of justice". The visitors ask the detained person whether they have been informed of their rights under the Police and Criminal Evidence Act codes of practice (for example, to speak to a solicitor or to make a telephone call) and whether they are being treated properly. Visitors also check that the cells and other facilities within the custody suite, such as the toilets and food-preparation area, are clean. The custody record, which records everything that happens to someone whilst they are in police custody, may also be examined.

If the custody visitors find any issues, or a detained person raises an issue about their treatment, the visitors raise these with the officer in charge of the custody suite, or of the police station. The visitors complete a report of each visit, which will record their finding including any issues identified during the course of the visit. Copies of the report are sent to the police authority.

=== Independent Custody Visiting Association ===
Custody visitors are represented nationally by the Independent Custody Visiting Association (ICVA), which provides training, publicity and support to custody visitors, and also to police authorities in carrying out their statutory duty to have in place custody visiting arrangements.

Independent custody visiting, through the ICVA, has been nominated by the United Kingdom Government as one of the means by which the UK fulfills its responsibilities under the Optional Protocol to the Convention against Torture and other Cruel, Inhuman or Degrading Treatment or Punishment.

== Prisoner escort and custody lay observers ==
Lay observers carry out a similar function to that of custody visitors, but in relation to the escort of prisoners from one place to another, or their custody at court.

The Criminal Justice Act 1991 provided for the contracting out of prisoner escort services, including the custody of prisoners on court premises. The Act also required the establishment of a panel of lay observers to inspect the conditions in which prisoners are transported or held. The Act is supplemented by Prison Service Orders and police policies where court prisoner custody is co-located with a police custody suite.

In a report produced in 2005, HM Inspectorate of Court Administration and HM Inspectorate of Prisons commented that the training and reporting arrangements for lay observers were unsatisfactory. National training standards, regular re-appointment protocols and a national reporting platform to ensure speedy dissemination of reportable issues to various stakeholders within the Ministry of Justice were introduced in 2012. (Also in 2012, HM Inspectorate of Prisons drew up a programme for its own inspection of court custody facilities.)
