= Frederick Henry Caiger =

British architect (1825–1904)

Frederick Henry Caiger (1825 (Note: Baptised at St Thomas Church, Winchester on 23 October 1825.) – 14 May 1904) was a British architect who, for 13 years, was the surveyor and chief architect for the Metropolitan Police in London. He held the post from 1868 to 1881. He was the third architect to hold the post since its inception in 1842. He took over the role from Thomas Charles Sorby, who had held the role for two years.

== Career ==
Caiger was born in Winchester, the only son of Frederick Caiger, a solicitor. Caiger Jr., studied architecture under Thomas Hellyer. His notable police designs include the former police stations on Commercial Road (1874-1875) and in Islington and Isleworth (1873) and probably that in Waltham Abbey.

He died at 87 St Mark's Road, North Kensington, London. His son Frederick Foord Caiger became a medical doctor.
