= Police custody =

Police custody may refer to:

- Arrest
- Pre-trial detention
- Detention (imprisonment)

== See also ==
- Powers of the police in England and Wales#Detention after arrest
  - Custody suite (temporary detention facility for suspects being questioned)
