= Police box =

Type of public telephone

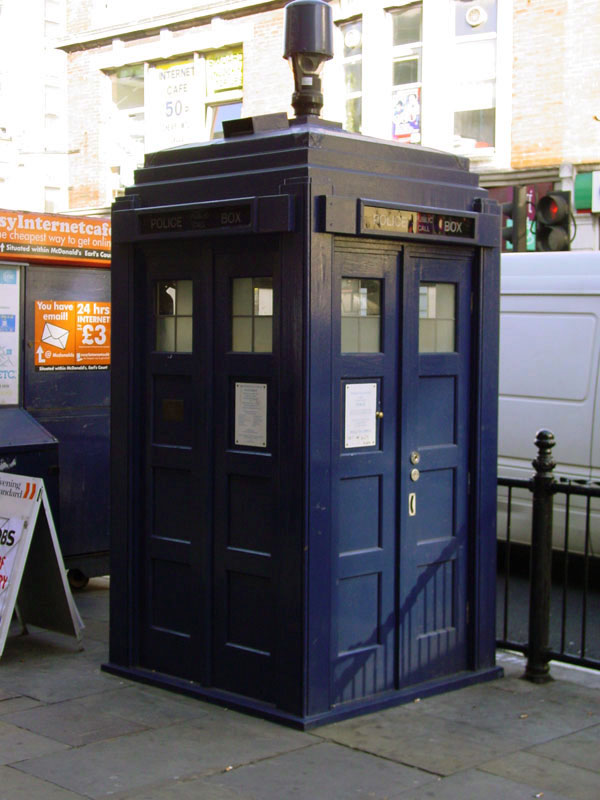
A police box outside Earl's Court tube station in London, built in 1996 and based on the 1929 Gilbert Mackenzie Trench design

A police box is a public telephone kiosk or callbox for the use of members of the police, or for members of the public to contact the police. It was used in some countries, most widely in the United Kingdom throughout the 20th century from the early 1920s. Unlike an ordinary callbox, its telephone was located behind a hinged door on the exterior, allowing anyone to use it without needing to enter. The interior could only be opened with a key, and served as a miniature police station in which officers could read or fill out paperwork, take meal breaks, and temporarily hold detainees until the arrival of transport.

A typical British police box contained a telephone linked directly to the local police station, allowing patrolling officers to keep in contact with the station, reporting anything unusual or requesting help if necessary. A light on top of the box would flash to alert an officer that they were requested to contact the station. Police boxes were usually blue, with the most notable exception being Glasgow, where they were red until the late 1960s. In addition to a telephone, they contained equipment such as an incident book, a fire extinguisher and a first aid kit. Labelled a "British icon" by the Plymouth Herald, the blue Metropolitan Police boxes, designed by Gilbert Mackenzie Trench in 1929, became Britain's most recognisable police boxes. The blue police box is associated with the science fiction television programme Doctor Who, in which the Doctor's time machine, a TARDIS, is disguised as a British police box.

== United Kingdom ==
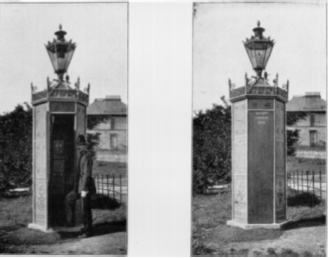
An 1894 advertisement for the "Glasgow Style Police Signal Box System", sold by the National Telephone Company

The first public police telephones in Britain appeared in Glasgow in 1891. These tall, hexagonal, cast-iron boxes were painted red and had large gas lanterns fixed to the roof, as well as a mechanism which enabled the central police station to light the lanterns as signals to police officers in the vicinity to call the station for instructions. As with Chicago's boxes, the original intent was that trusted members of the public would be allowed access to the telephone in case of emergency using a special key that was registered to them, which would remain trapped in the lock until released by a master key carried by a policeman. A newer, rectangular type of cast-iron police box was introduced in Glasgow in 1912, but with the signal light now powered by electricity rather than gas, and access to the telephone now restricted solely to the police.

Rectangular, wooden, garden shed style police boxes were introduced in Sunderland in 1923 by Chief Constable Frederick J. Crawley, and then in Newcastle in 1925 when he took over as Chief Constable there. Crawley was arguably the first proponent (at least in Britain) of the concept of the police box as a miniature police station rather than just a communications point, including unrestricted access to the telephone by the general public for contacting police, ambulance, and fire services. His well-publicised success with these boxes, and the revised policing methods they allowed, soon led to the adoption of similar police box systems in many of the larger cities in the north of England, including Manchester and Sheffield.

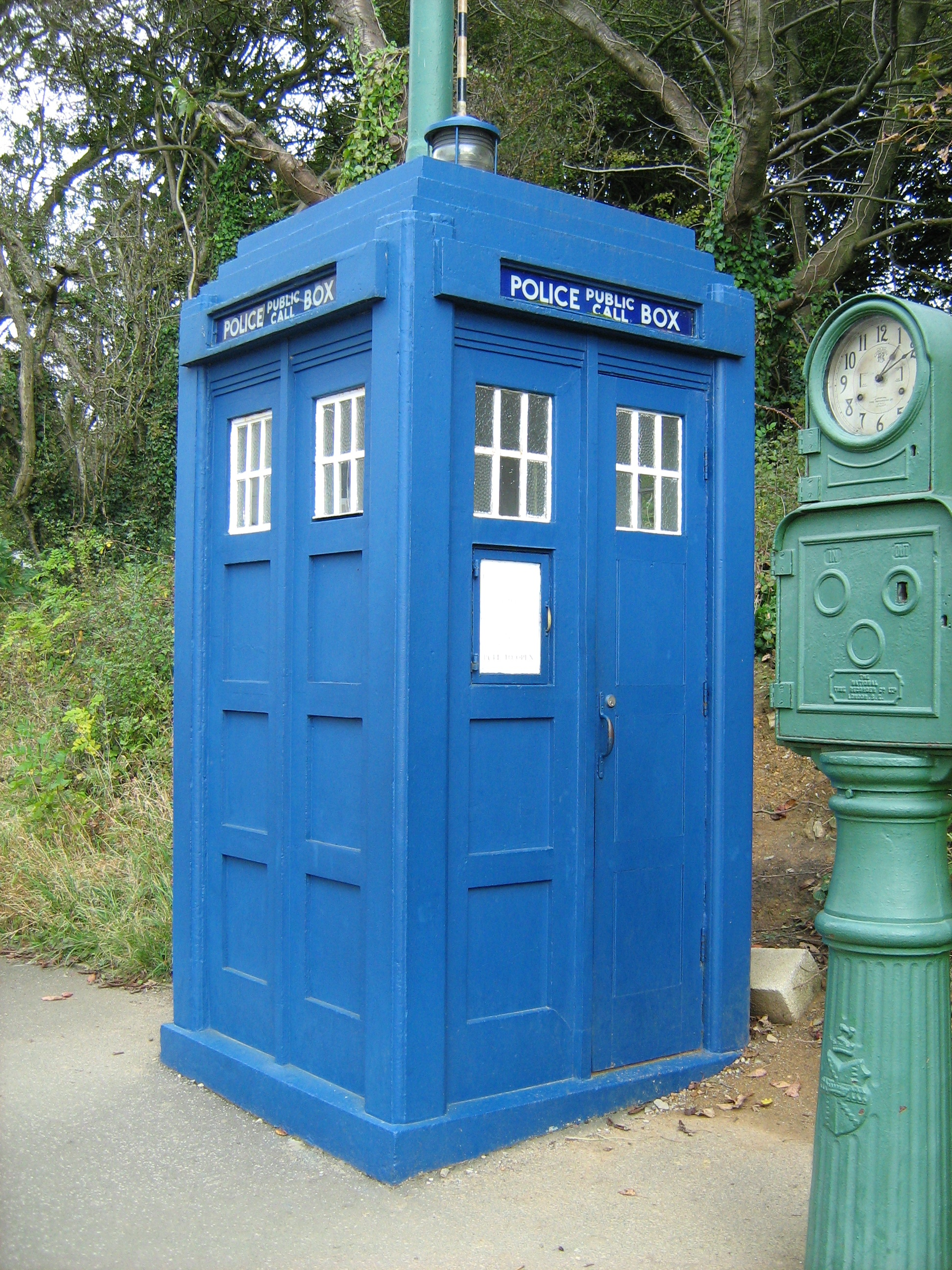
A 1929 Mackenzie Trench design police box preserved at the National Tramway Museum in Crich, Derbyshire. Between 1929 and 1938 approximately 1,000 of these were built, with 685 installed in London.

The Metropolitan Police (Met) introduced police boxes throughout London between 1928 and 1937, and the design that later became the most well-known was created by the Met's own surveyor and architect, Gilbert Mackenzie Trench, in 1929. Between 1929 and 1938 around 1,000 examples of the Mackenzie Trench police box were installed. They measured 9 ft 4 in (2.84 m) tall, and 4 ft 6 in (1.37 m) wide.

=== History ===
Initially, two competing prototype designs were installed on the newly built Becontree Estate in December 1928, with the winning builder being contracted to erect 43 boxes made of wood with concrete roofs in the final Trench pattern as part of experimental installations in the Richmond and Wood Green sub-divisions, which were completed in December 1929 and January 1930 respectively. Their success resulted in the widespread adoption of the system throughout Greater London over the next eight years using newer models of the Mackenzie Trench design now made completely of concrete for increased durability, save the doors, which were still made of teak. Constables complained that the concrete boxes were extremely cold and damp compared to their wooden predecessors, so provisions were made for more powerful heaters. For use by officers, the interiors of the boxes normally contained a stool, a table with drawer, a brush and duster, a fire extinguisher, a first aid kit, and a small electric heater. Like the 19th and early 20th century Glaswegian boxes, the London police boxes had a light at the top of each box, which would flash as a signal to police officers indicating that they should contact the station.

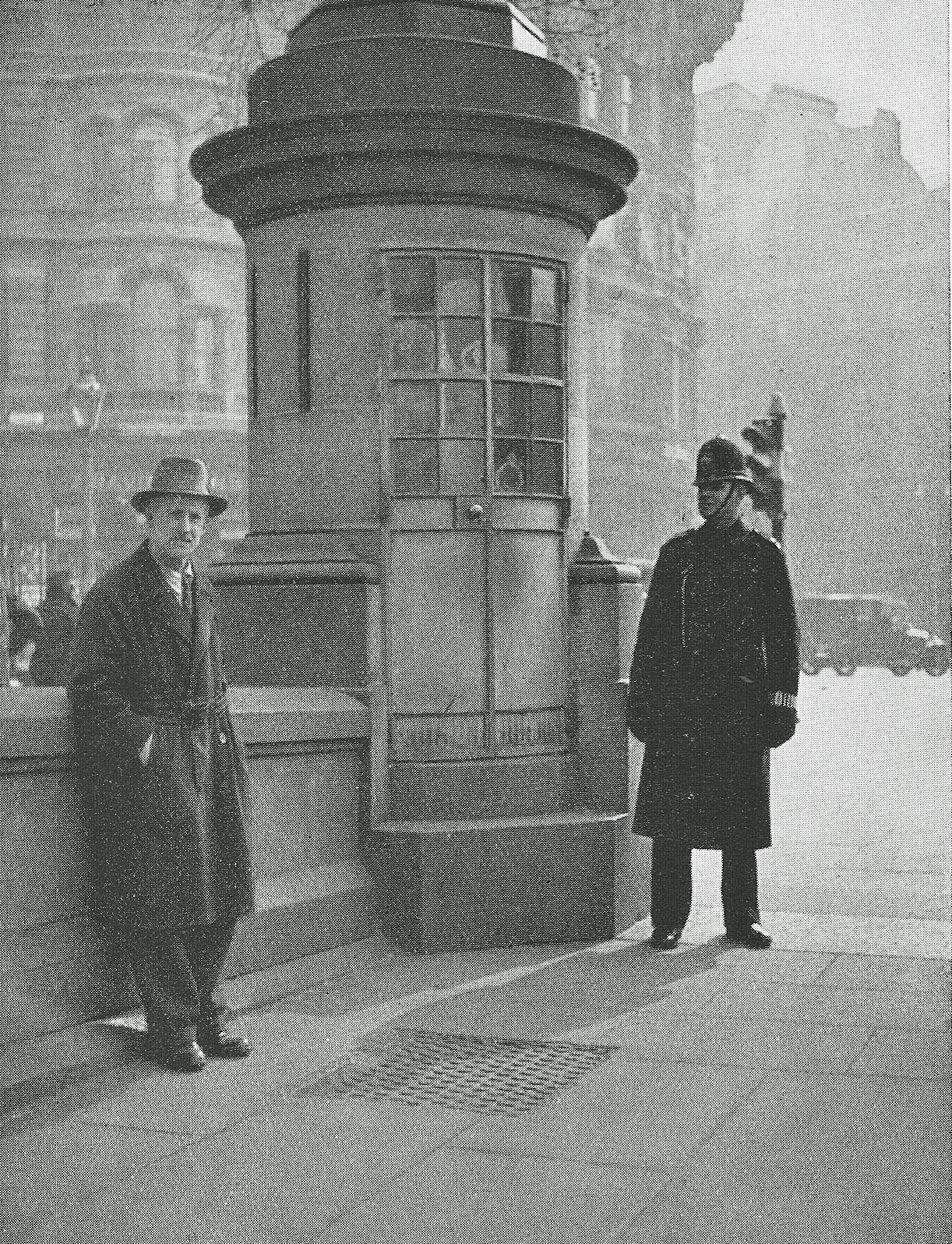
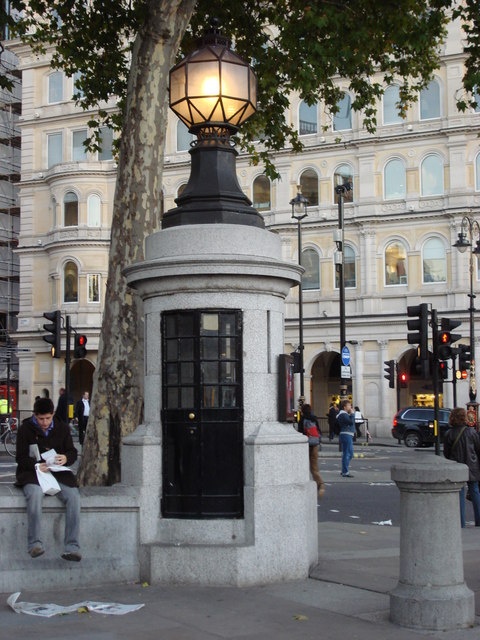
This police box (left, pictured in the late 1920s) at the south east corner of Trafalgar Square in London was constructed in the base of the lamp plinth. Today it is used for storage.

By 1953, there were 685 police boxes on the streets of Greater London, with an additional 72 smaller police posts, also designed by Trench, used in the inner divisions where there was no space for the larger kiosks. Between 1923 and 1960 the police box and/or post system had been adopted by most of the provincial police forces throughout Great Britain. The design and construction of the police boxes used in each system were at the discretion of each individual force, and consequently varied a great deal from location to location, but the police pillars/posts were usually one of three successive models provided by the General Post Office (GPO).

Police boxes continued to play an important role in police work until the late 1960s to early 1970s, when they were phased out following the introduction of personal radios. As the main functions of the boxes were superseded by the rise of portable telecommunications devices like the walkie-talkie and the near universal access by the public to telephones and the 999 emergency number, very few police boxes remain in Britain today. Some have been converted into High Street coffee bars. These are common in Edinburgh, though the city also has dozens that remain untouched — most in various states of disrepair. Edinburgh's boxes are relatively large, and are of a rectangular plan, with a design by Ebenezer James MacRae, who was inspired by the city's abundance of neoclassical architecture. At their peak there were 86 scattered around the city. In 2012, Lothian and Borders Police sold a further 22, leaving them owning 20.

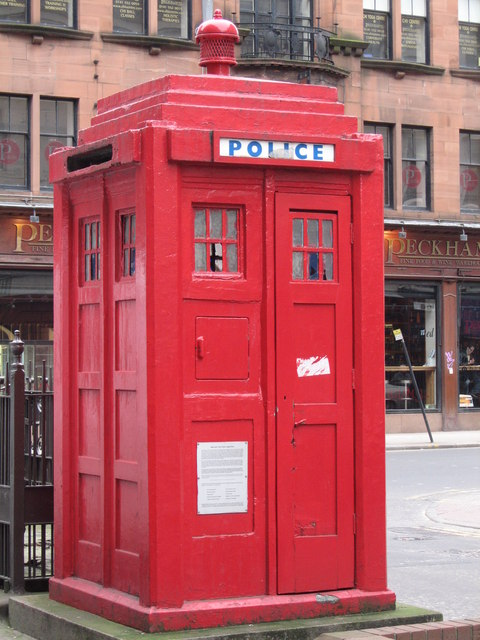
A slightly modified Mackenzie Trench police box, coloured red, as seen in Glasgow

Beginning in 1933, a slightly simplified version of the Met's police box design was also used by the City of Glasgow Police when its old cast-iron police boxes were replaced by an expanded Crawley type of integrated police box system. This was done as part of the restructuring of the force brought about by Percy Sillitoe after he was appointed Chief Constable at the end of 1931. Like the cast-iron boxes before them, the new concrete boxes continued to be painted red until the popularity of Doctor Who prompted a change to blue in the late 1960s.

In 1994, Strathclyde Police decided to scrap the remaining Glasgow police boxes. However, owing to the intervention of the Civil Defence & Emergency Service Preservation Trust and the Glasgow Building Preservation Trust, some police boxes were retained and remain today as part of Glasgow's architectural heritage. At least five remain—on Great Western Road (at the junction with Queen Margaret Drive and Byres Road); Buchanan Street (at the corner of Royal Bank Place); Wilson Street (at the intersection of Glassford Street, completely restored); one on Sauchiehall street at the junction with West Nile Street and one near the corner of Cathedral Square (at the corner of Castle Street, also restored). There was also a red police box preserved in the Glasgow Museum of Transport but this was returned to the Civil Defence Trust after Glasgow City Council decided it did not fit in with the new Transport Museum. The police boxes in Glasgow on Great Western Road, Cathedral Square, and Buchanan Street are currently under licence to a Glasgow-based coffee outlet. As of 2009, only the Great Western Road and Buchanan Street boxes have been transformed to dispense beverages, and restrictions are enforced by the Civil Defence & Emergency Service Preservation Trust to prevent the exterior of the boxes from being modified beyond the trademarked design.

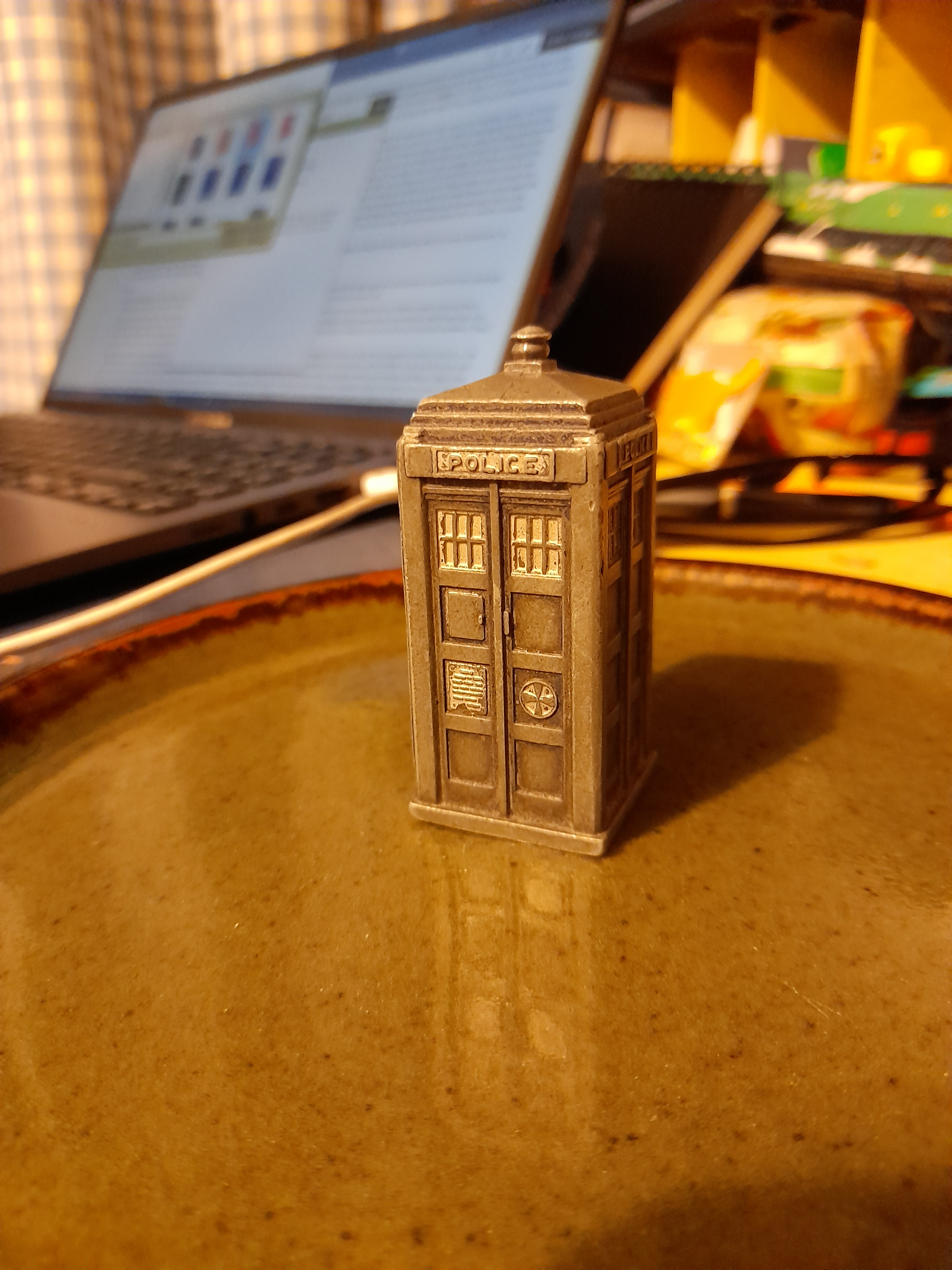
Dinky Toy police box manufactured in the 1940s by British toy company Meccano Ltd, based on the mk1 design

The Civil Defence & Emergency Service Preservation Trust now manages 11 of the UK's last Gilbert Mackenzie Trench police boxes on behalf of a private collector. Another blue police box of this style is preserved at the National Tramway Museum, Crich, Derbyshire. One of the trust's boxes stands outside the Kent Police Museum in Chatham, Kent, and another at Grampian Transport Museum. An original MacKenzie Trench box exists outside of the Metropolitan Police College (Peel Centre) at Hendon.

In the City of London, there are eight non-functioning police "call posts" still in place which are Grade II listed buildings. The City of London Police versions were cast iron rectangular posts, as the streets are too narrow for full sized boxes. One compartment contained the telephone and another locked compartment held a first aid kit. Fifty posts were installed in the "Square Mile" from 1907; they were in use until 1988.

On Thursday 18 April 1996, a new police box based on the Mackenzie Trench design was unveiled outside the Earl's Court tube station in London, equipped with CCTV cameras and a telephone to contact police. The telephone ceased to function in April 2000 when London's telephone numbers were changed, but the box remained, despite the fact that funding for its upkeep and maintenance had long since been exhausted. In March 2005, the Metropolitan Police resumed funding the refurbishment and maintenance of the box.

Glasgow introduced a new design of police boxes in 2005. The new boxes are not booths but rather computerized kiosks that connect the caller to a police CCTV control room operator. They stand 10 feet in height with a chrome finish and act as 24-hour information points, with three screens providing information on crime prevention, police force recruitment and tourist information.

Manchester also has Help Points similar to those in Glasgow, which contain a siren that is activated upon the emergency button being pressed; this also causes CCTV cameras nearby to focus on the Help Point.

Liverpool has structures similar to police boxes, known as police Help Points, which are essentially an intercom box with a push button mounted below a CCTV camera on a post with a direct line to the police.

Boscombe in Bournemouth opened its own old-style police box in April 2014 in a bid to tackle crime in the area. The box contains a yellow phone for when it is not staffed by police, along with security cameras and a defibrillator.

In February 2021, the City of London launched a competition to bring a back a new and updated police box to its streets, with the winning entry unveiled in June that year.

=== In Doctor Who ===
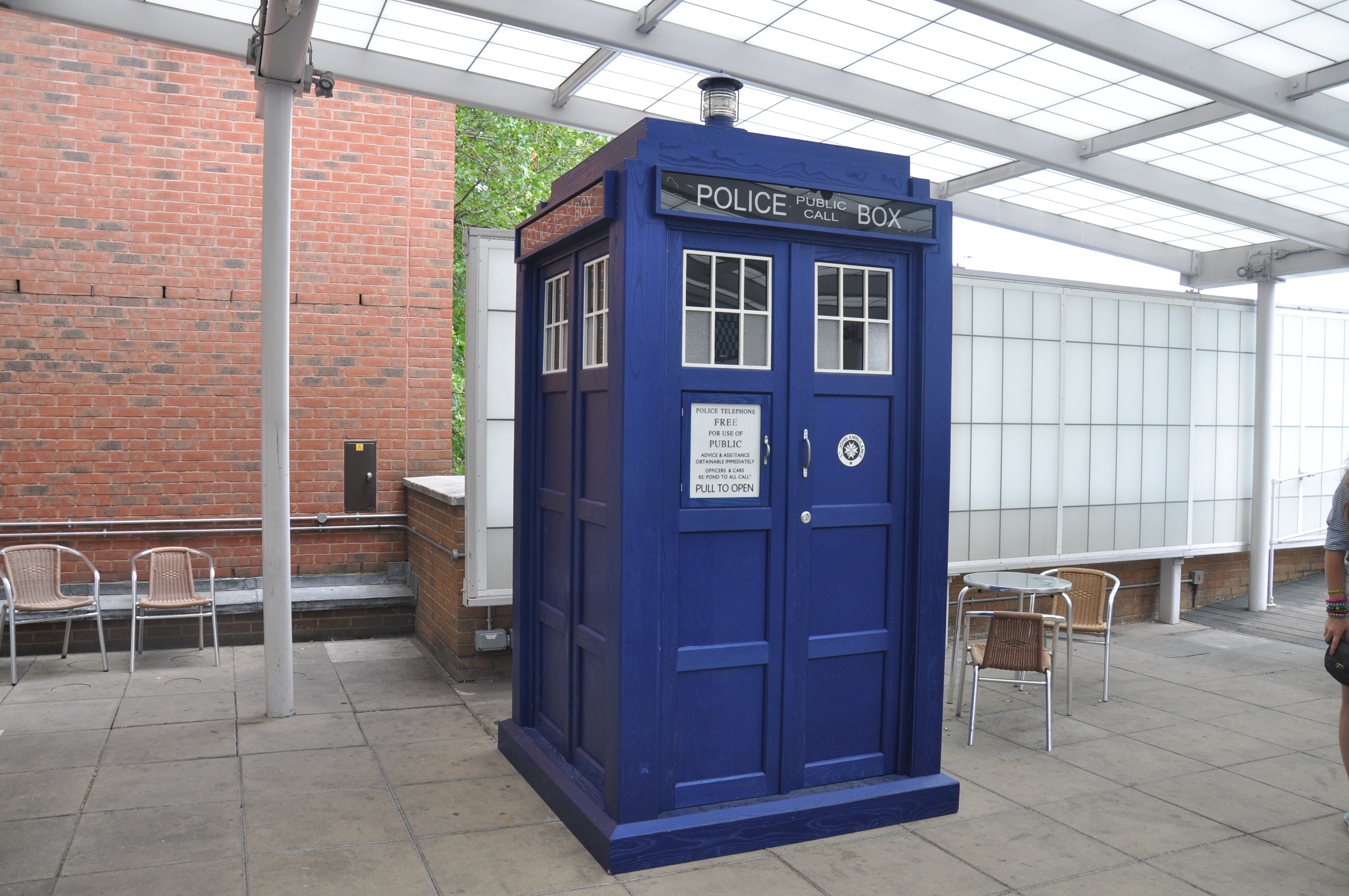
The TARDIS prop used from 2010 to 2017 seen at BBC Television Centre

The BBC science-fiction television series Doctor Who features a time machine, the TARDIS, disguised as a Mackenzie Trench-style police box. As police boxes were phased out in the 1960s and 1970s, over time the image of the blue police box became associated as much with Doctor Who as with the police force. In 1996, the BBC applied for a trademark to use the blue police box design in merchandising associated with Doctor Who. In 1998, relating to the recent (1996) construction of a new Police Box outside of Earl's Court tube station (London) the Metropolitan Police filed an objection to the trademark claim, maintaining that they owned the rights to the police box image.

In 2002, the Patent Office ruled in favour of the BBC, arguing that there was no evidence that the Metropolitan Police—or any other police force—had ever registered the design as a trademark. In addition, the BBC had been selling merchandise based on the image for over three decades without complaint by the police. The series was revived in 2005, and the police box (with occasional minor re-designs and variations from historic examples) continues to feature prominently in almost every episode.

== United States ==
The first police telephone was installed in Albany, New York in 1877, one year after Alexander Graham Bell patented the telephone. Call boxes for use by both police and trusted members of the public were first installed in Chicago in 1880, initially housed in kiosks to protect the inner signal boxes from the weather and to limit access to them so as to discourage false alarms. In 1883, Washington, D.C. installed its own system; Detroit installed police call boxes in 1884, and in 1885, Boston followed suit. These were direct line telephones usually placed inside a metal box on a post which could often be accessed by a key or breaking a glass panel. In Chicago, the telephones were restricted to police use, but the boxes also contained a dial mechanism which members of the public could use to signal different types of alarms via telegraph: there were 11 signals, including "Police Wagon Required", "Thieves", "Forgers", "Murder", "Accident", "Fire" and "Drunkard".

== Gallery ==
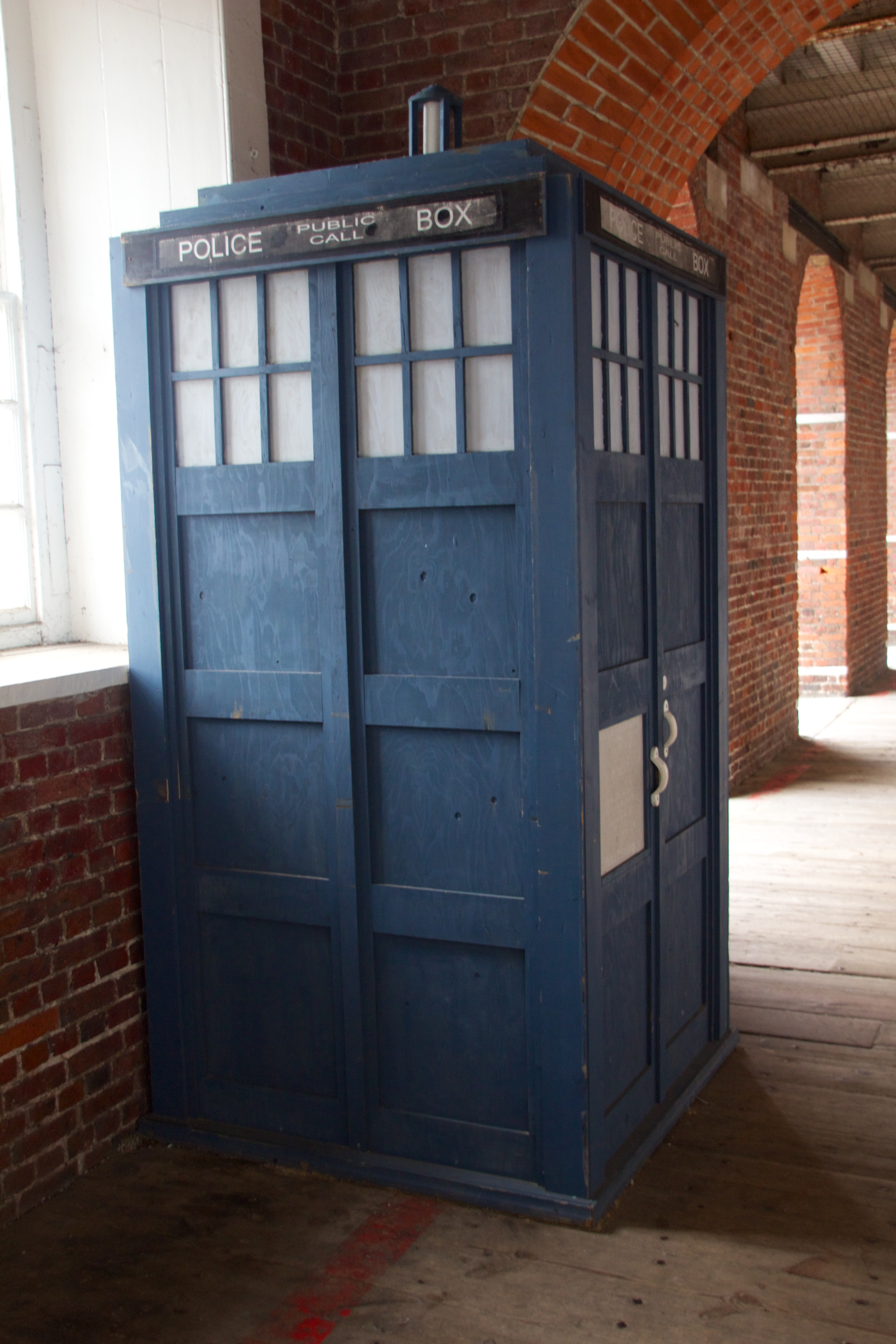
A fan-made imitation of the (2005 and onwards) version of the TARDIS - seen at Portsmouth Historic Dockyard, Hampshire

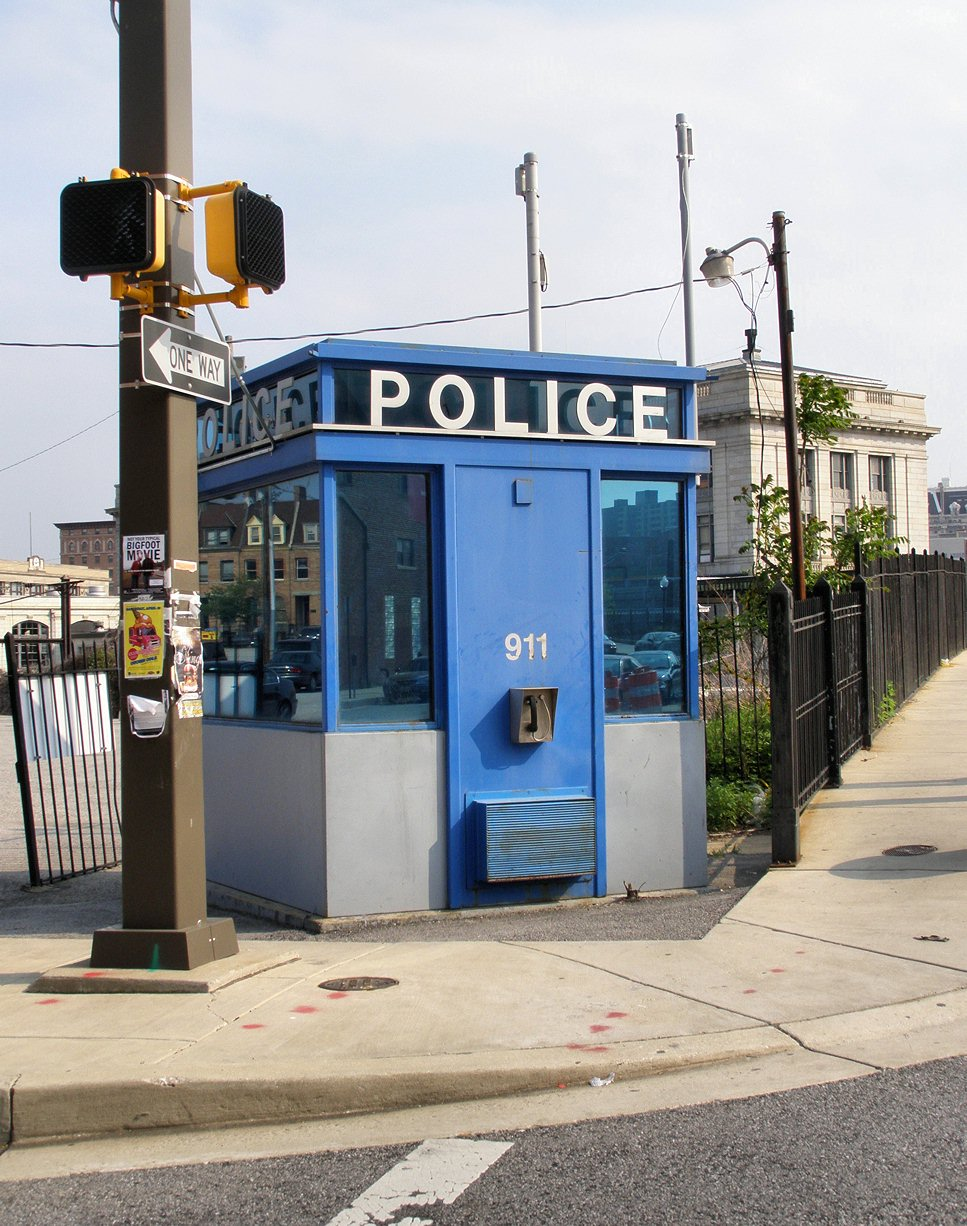
A modern police box in Baltimore, Maryland; based on the British concept and operated by the Baltimore Police Department

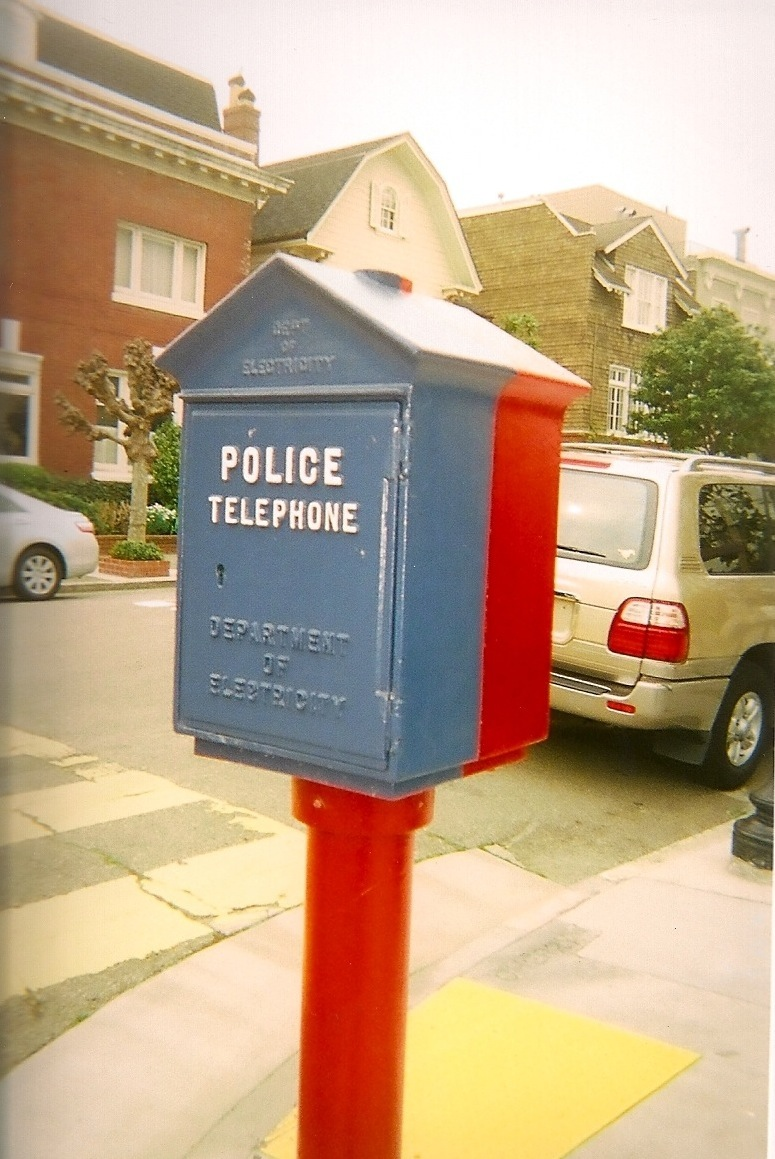
Fire alarm and police call box in San Francisco, California; one of 2,040 and 460 in the city

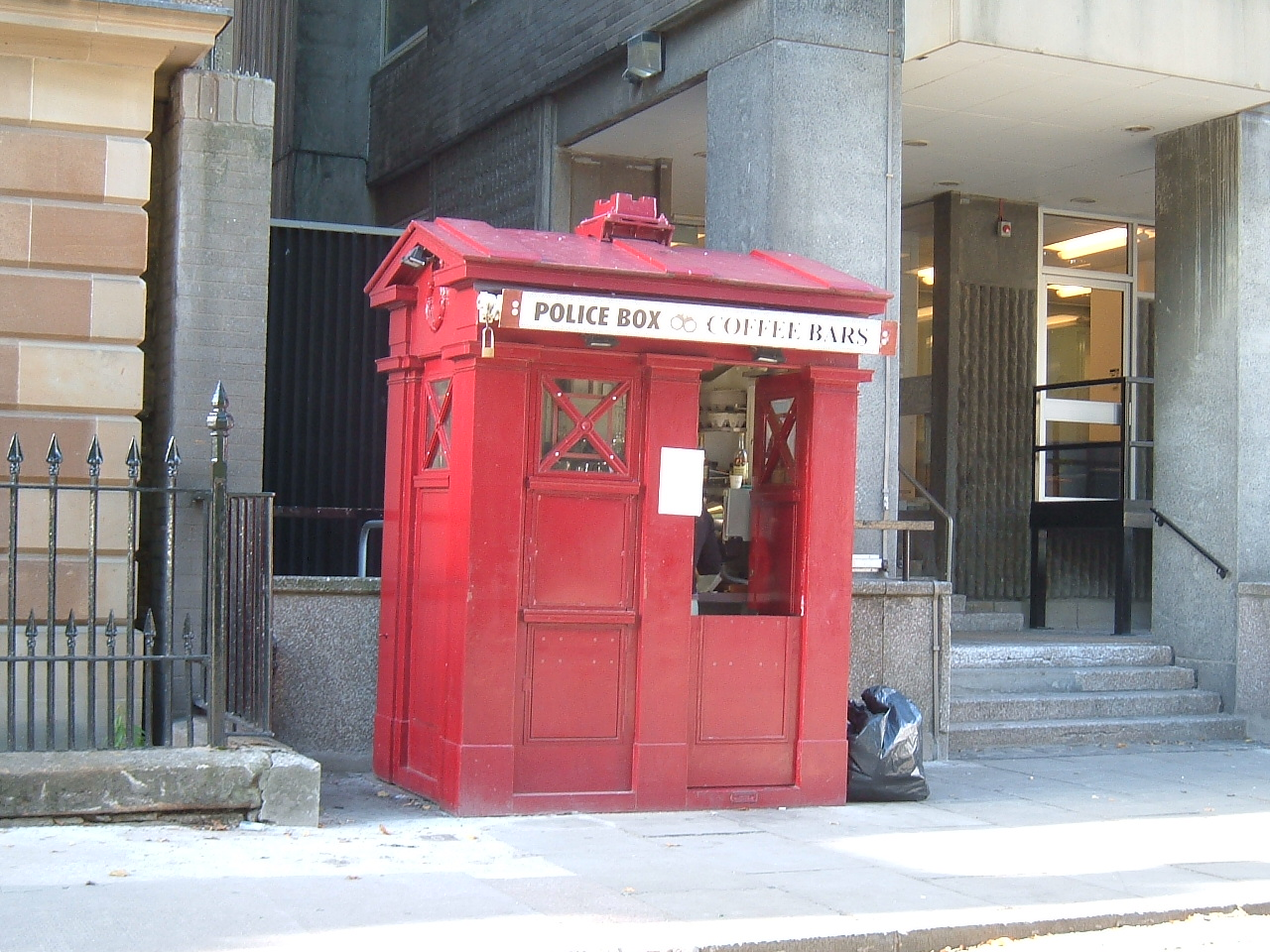
This police box in Edinburgh now serves as a coffee shop.

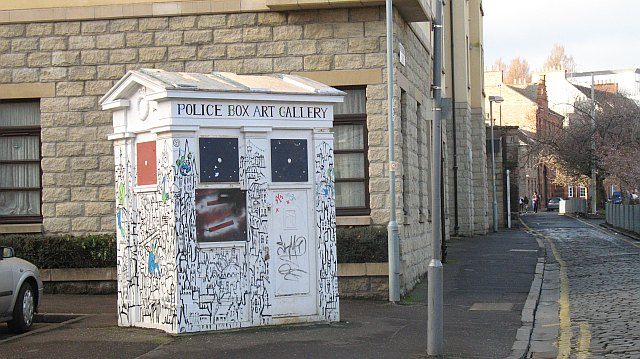
This police box in Edinburgh now serves as an art gallery.

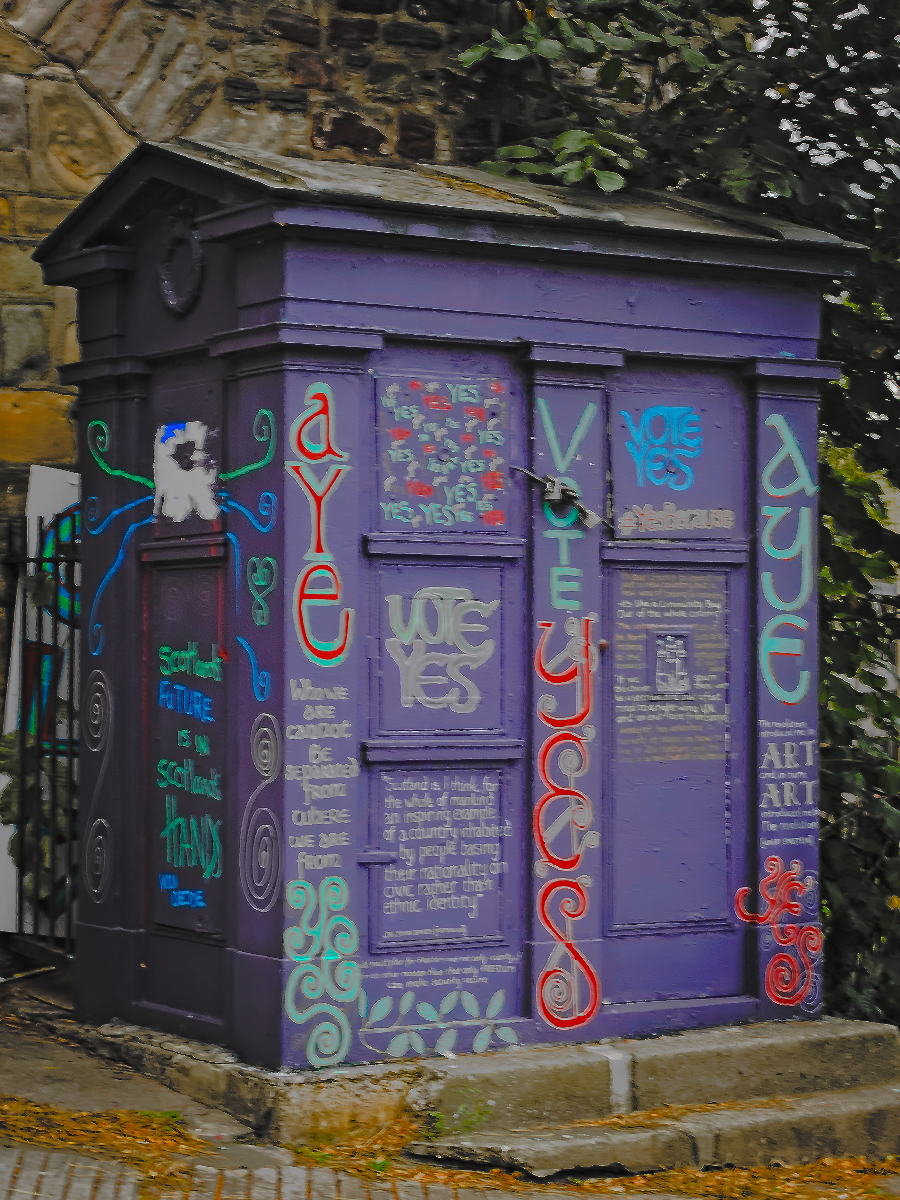
An Edinburgh police box with graffiti from the 2014 Scottish independence referendum

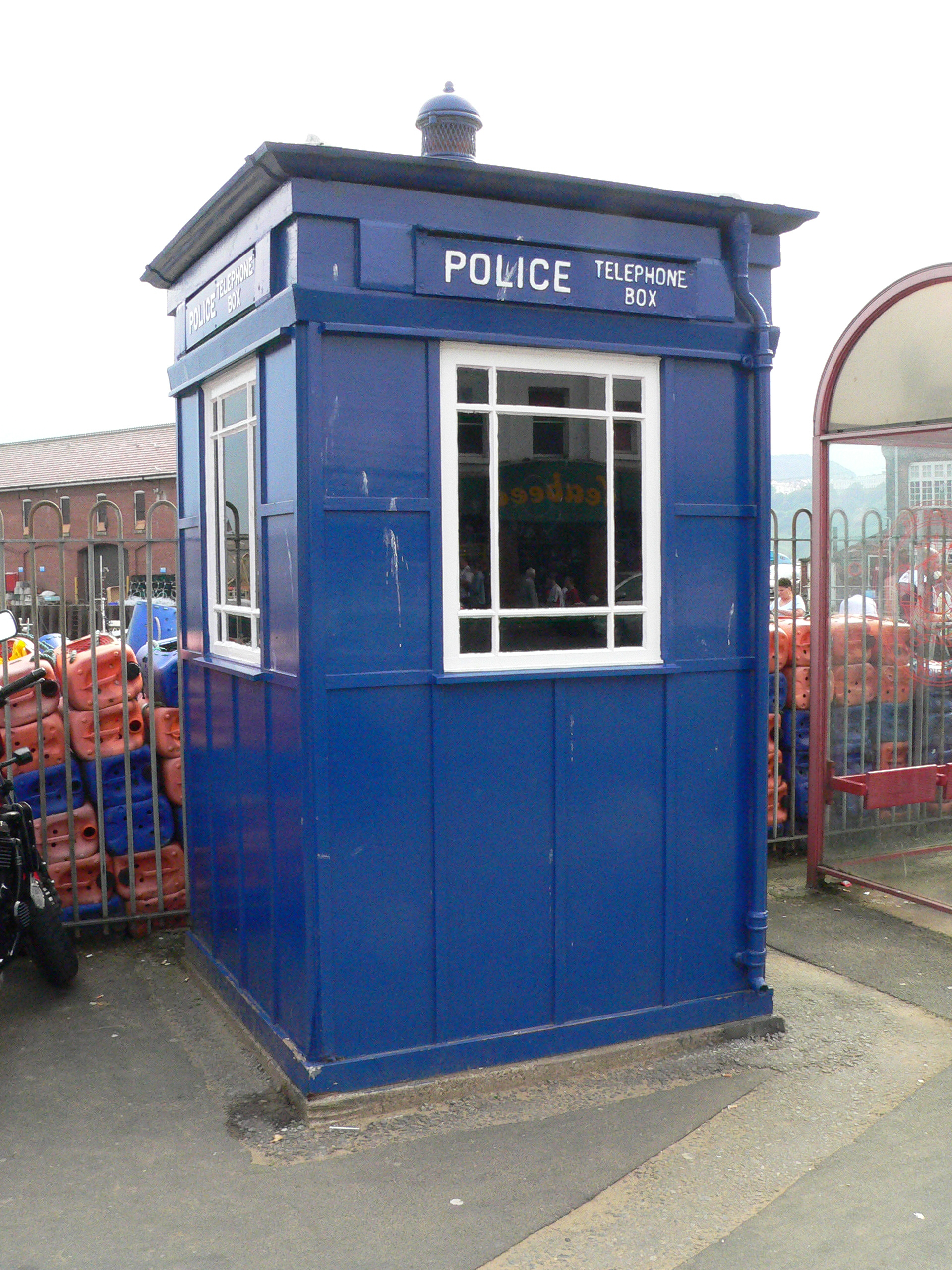
A police box on the seafront at Scarborough

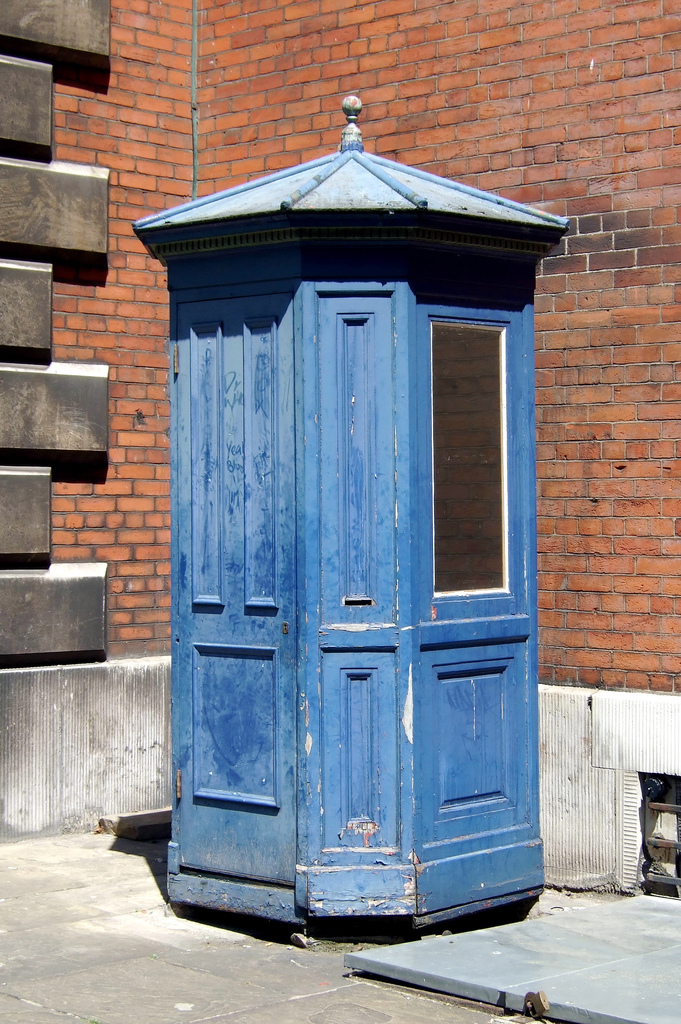
An old police box (no telephone) in Covent Garden, London

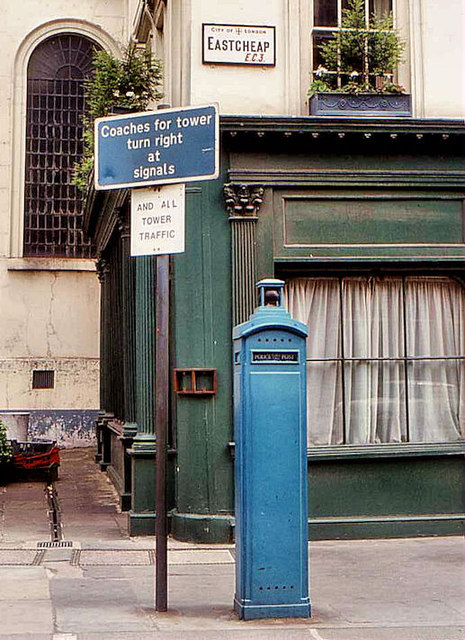
A City of London Police telephone pillar on Eastcheap, 1981

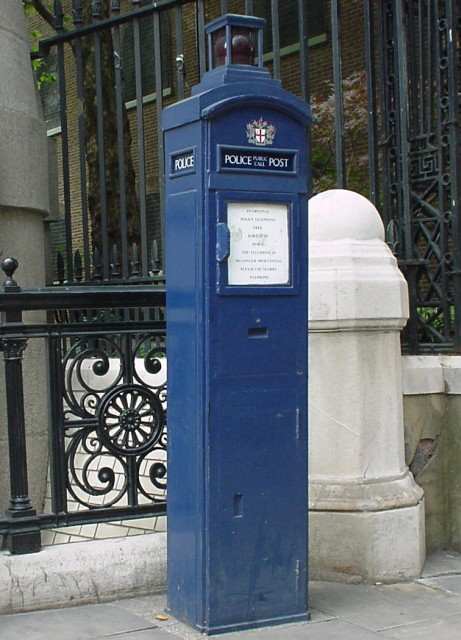
Police telephone post (not functional) at St. Martin's Le Grand, London — painted (incorrectly) in 'Met' dark blue. 'City' boxes were painted in a light blue.

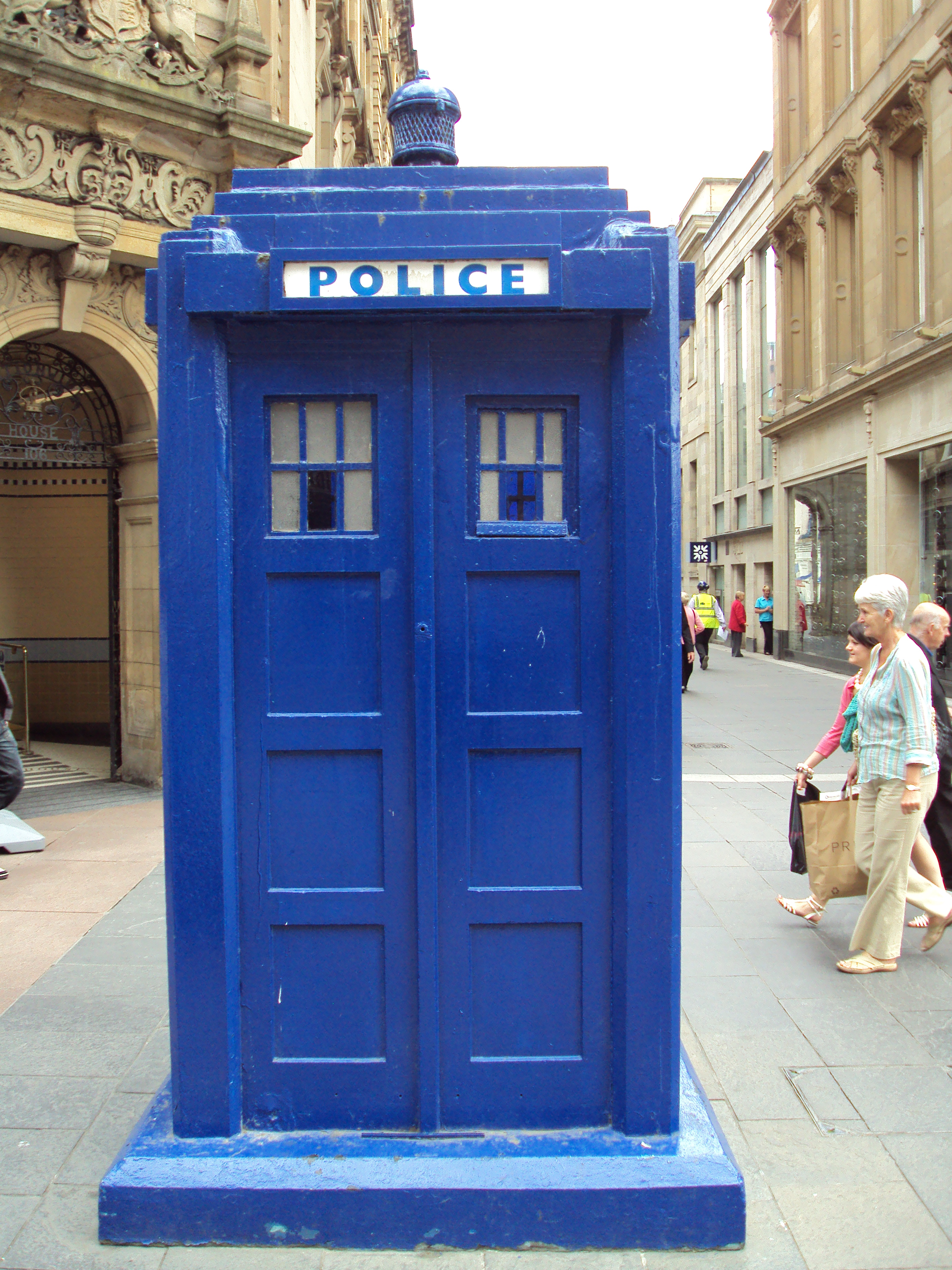
A Mackenzie Trench design police box in Glasgow

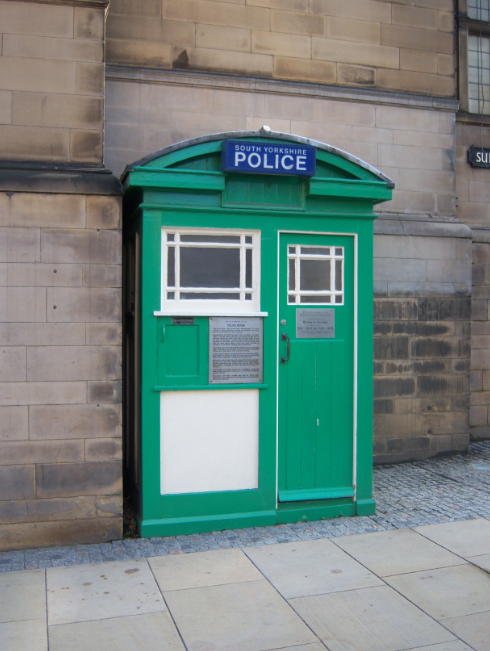
A 1929 police box that stands on Surrey Street, outside Sheffield Town Hall. It is still used as a post for city ambassadors, providing tourist information.

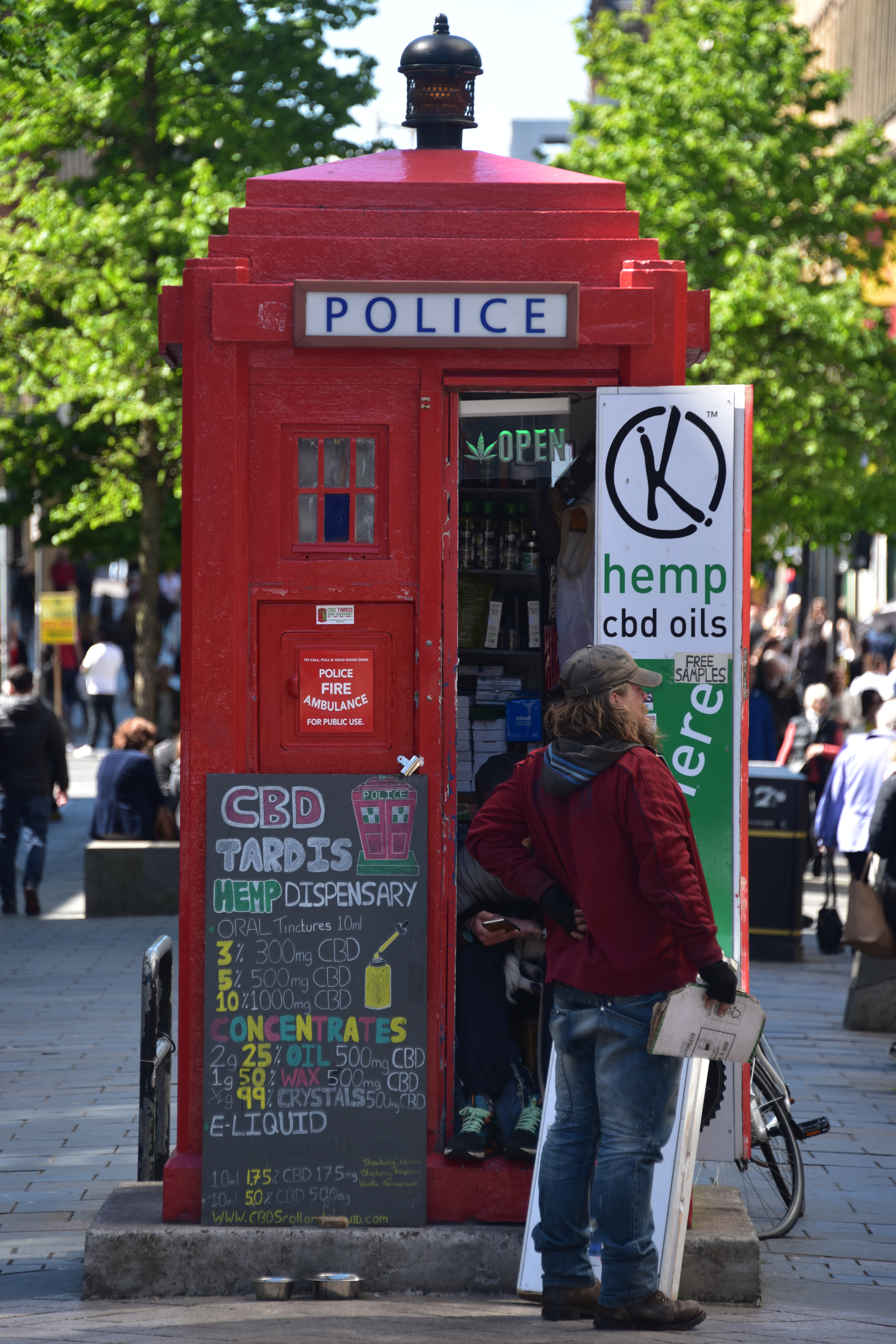
A Glasgow police box (red variation of a Mackenzie Trench) near the Glasgow Royal Concert Hall serving as a hemp dispensary

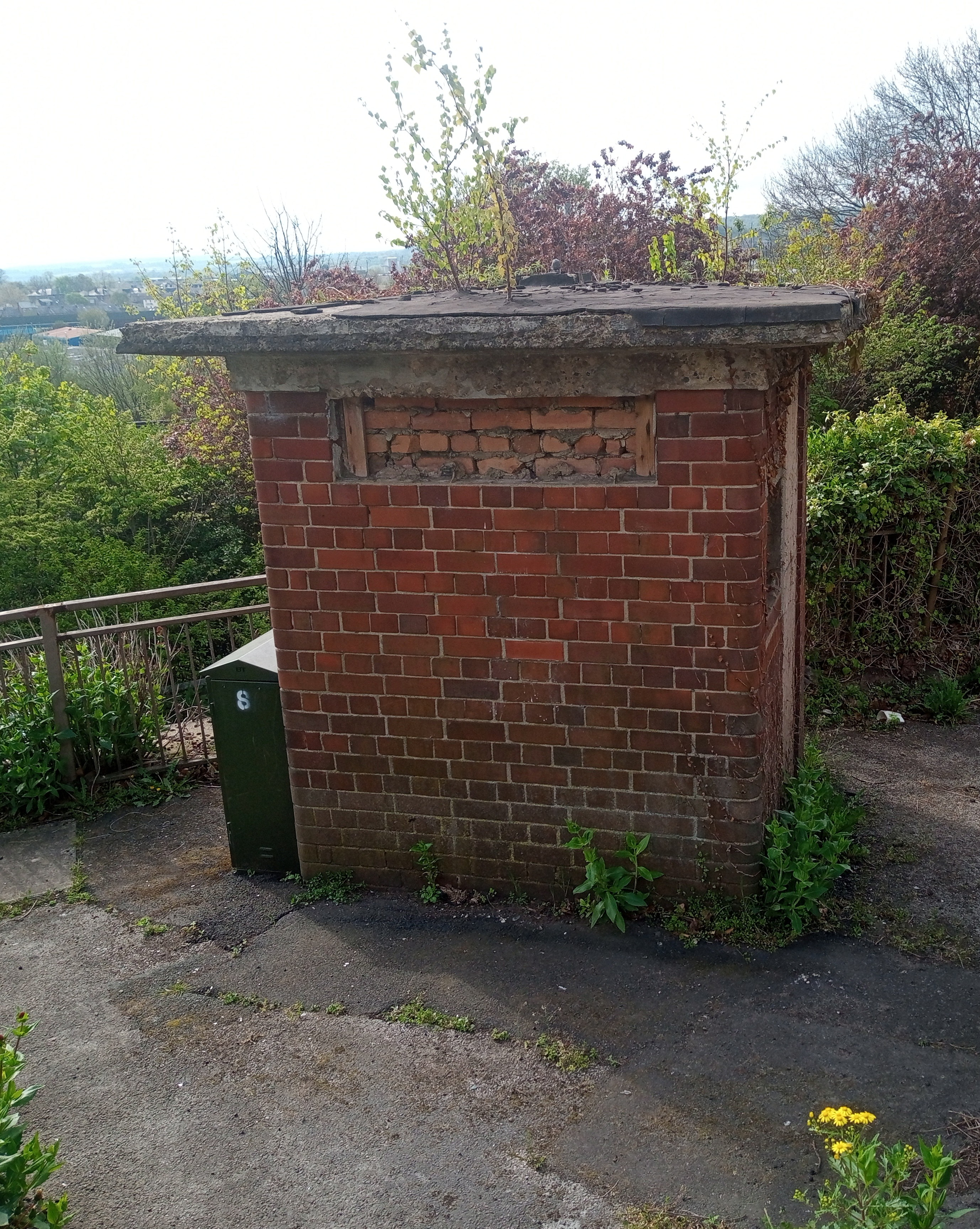
A rare brick-built police box in Dewsbury

== See also ==
- Kōban
- Somerton TARDIS
- Red telephone box
- Sentry box
- Fire alarm call box
- Royal Mile police box
