= Gilbert Mackenzie Trench =

Scottish architect (1885–1979)

- Born: 4 April 1885; East Dulwich, London, England
- Died: 1979 (aged 93–94); Wanganui, New Zealand
- Known for: Police box

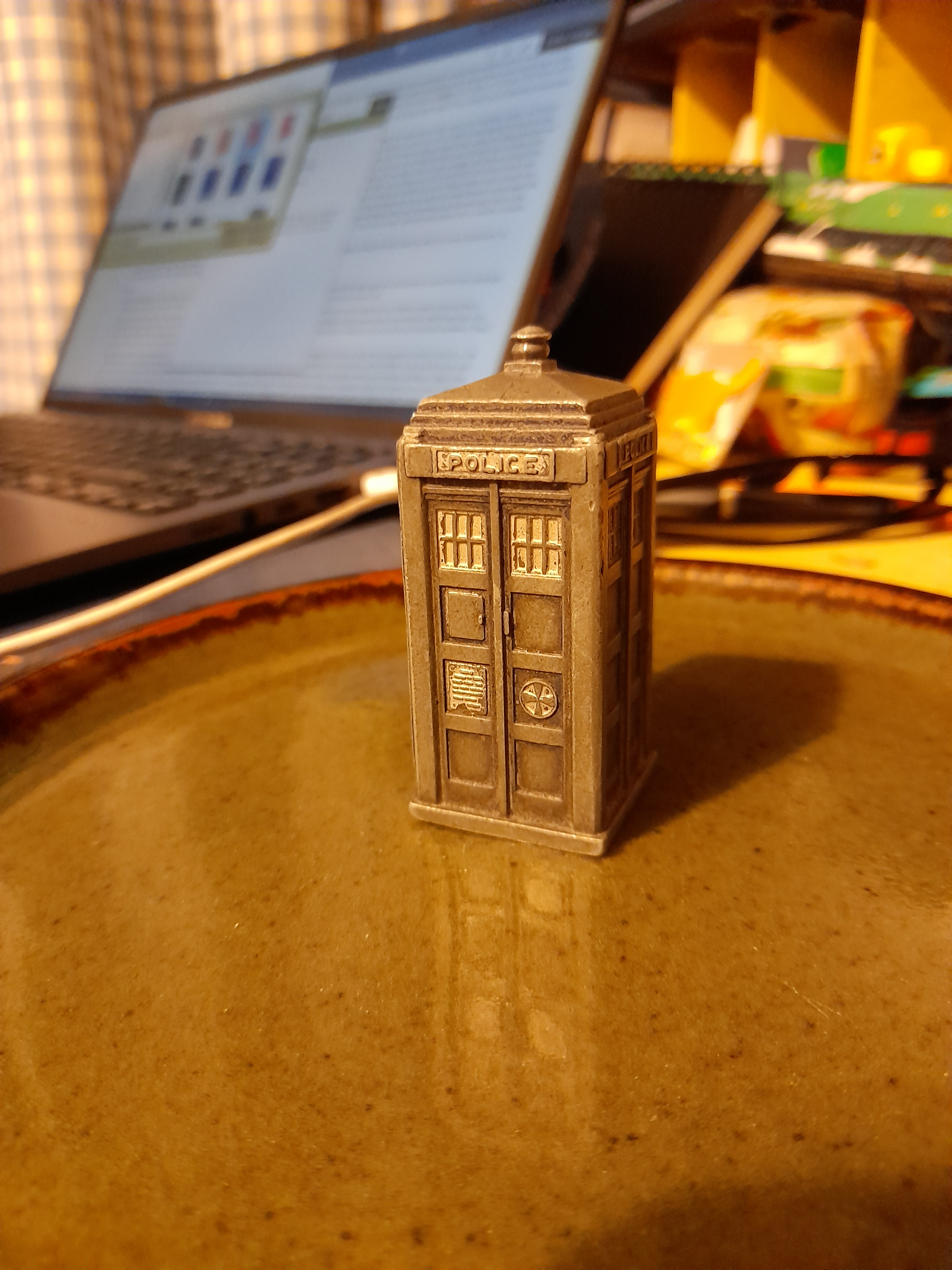
A police box Dinky toy, c. 1936–1960, based on the Mark 1 design as evidenced by the lower signs.

Gilbert Mackenzie Trench (1885–1979) was a Scottish architect who was the Chief Architect and Surveyor to the Metropolitan Police between 1920 and 1945. He was the sixth such architect to hold the post since its inception in 1842. He took over the role from John Dixon Butler, who died in post in 1920.

He is credited as the designer of the police telephone box, which has since become a pop culture icon owing to its immortalisation as the space-time machine of Doctor Who.

Other buildings he is known to have designed include the police station and associated accommodation in Tooting in South London. Trench also designed Charles Rowan House on Margery Street, Clerkenwell, which was built in the 1920s as married quarters for Metropolitan policemen.

Mackenzie Trench retired in 1945 and was succeeded in the role by John Innes Elliott in 1947.

== Early life ==
Mackenzie Trench was born on 4 April 1885 in East Dulwich. He was one of five children and the eldest of two sons to the Scottish civil engineer, Gilbert Kennedy Campbell Trench (1855–1937), and his wife Clementina née Flett (1857–1938). Mackenzie Trench's younger brother, Alexander, later became an engineer, associated with the office of Babcock & Wilcox.

== Police Box ==
In 1928, Trench was commissioned by the Metropolitan Police to design a new police box, able to not only take calls from public notifying the police force of a crime, but to also allow a "Bobby on the Beat" to sit inside and make himself a cup of tea whilst he waited for a call-out. It began its installation in 1929, with demonstrations at the 1936 Radio Show. The boxes saw much use over the next 40 years, doubling as air raid sirens in World War II. By 1969, however, walkie-talkies and quick response vehicles such as the Ford Zephyr had made it redundant, and the home secretary James Callaghan had nearly all of them demolished. As of present, only 11 remain of the over 1000 originally constructed. It was immortalised in the British TV show Doctor Who after it became the disguise for the titular character's space-time machine, the TARDIS.

He retired from the role of surveyor and chief architect to the Metropolitan Police in 1945; he was succeeded in the role by John Innes Elliott in 1947.

== Personal life ==
Mackenzie Trench married Dorothy Olare Buswell Booth on 31 August 1912 at the Church of Emmanuel, East Dulwich. Trench fathered two children, Jean Doris Trench (1913–2008) and Kenneth Mackenzie Trench (1923 –1923). He died in 1979 in Wanganui, New Zealand.
