= Custody suite =

Temporary detention facility in police station

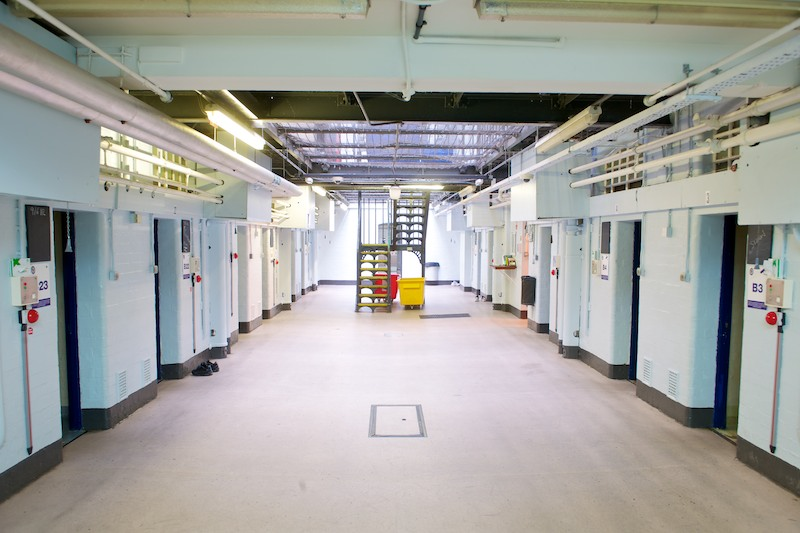
A police custody suite in Birmingham, England

A custody suite is an area within a police station in the United Kingdom designed and adapted to process and detain those who have been arrested, or who are there for purposes such as answering bail.

Historically, all police stations had a small number of individual cells where offenders could be detained. However, in recent years, most detainees are more likely to be taken to large police stations which are designated to hold prisoners. Suites are also known as custody centres.

== Experiences of detainees ==
The design, location (downtown or "the middle of nowhere"), and setting of the custody suite facilities greatly determines the experience of the accused. Juvenile offenders are unlikely to receive discrimination based on race or ethnicity at police stations, and are often placed together with other young suspects in a custody suite, or especially for tweeners and those who have autism spectrum disorder, are isolated for "safeguarding". Both police officers and the detainees are the "subject of surveillance" by supervisors; both thus have "a shared experience of life in the custody suite: they can both be watched."

== Facilities ==
There are numerous facilities contained within a police custody suite, which most commonly include:

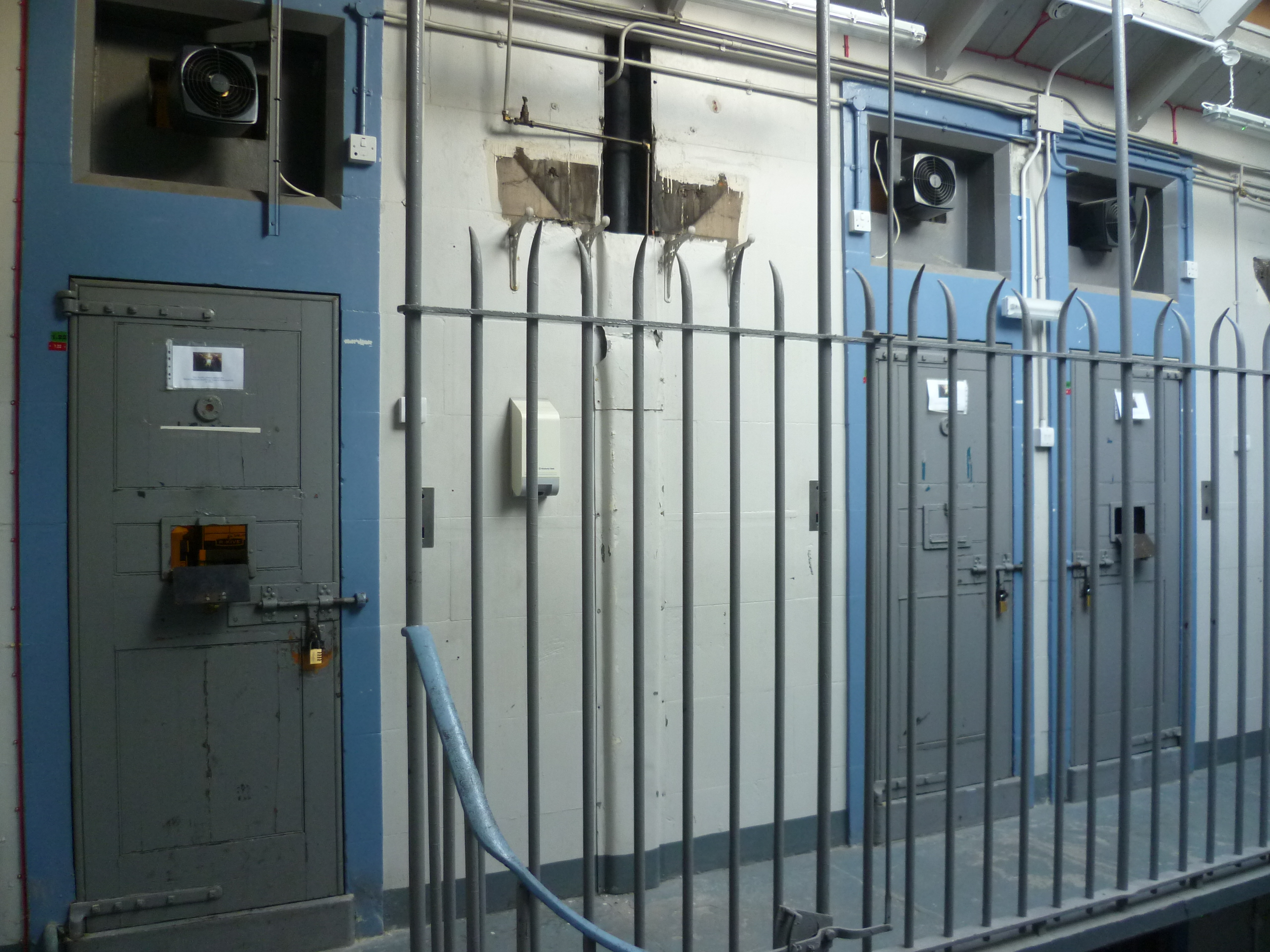
Holding cells used in Leith Police Station from 1833 to 2003

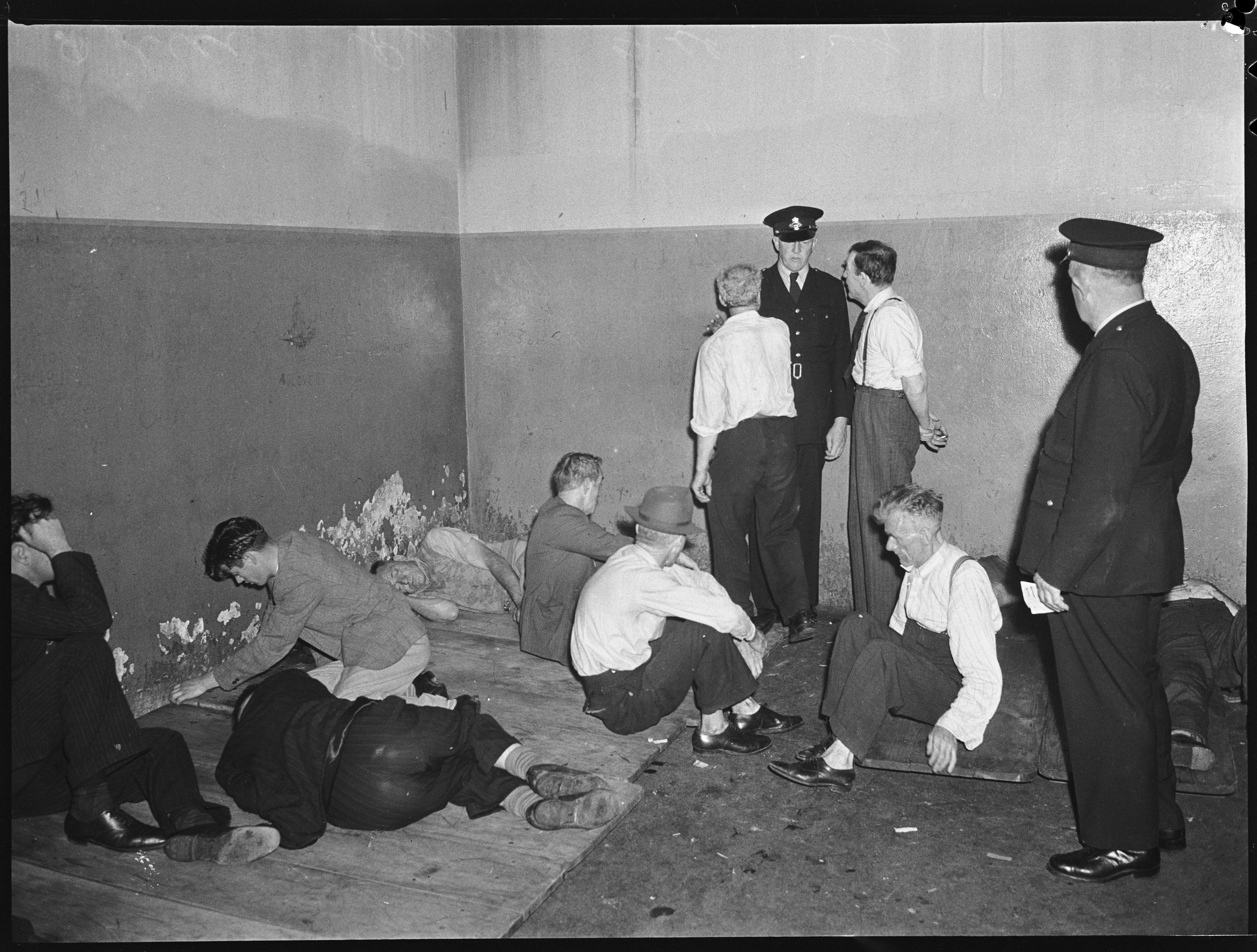
Drunks cell, police station, Pyrmont, Sydney, 1949

- A holding cell where officers await with detainees entry to the suite.
- A number of cells to hold detainees, often split into male, female and juvenile groups of cells.
- A prisoner processing area where custody officers (most commonly uniformed sergeants) process the detainees presented to them by police officers
- Designated interview rooms, holding equipment used to conduct and record interviews with suspects for use as evidence.
- A medical room for use by police medical staff
- Consultation rooms where detained persons can consult with their legal representatives.
- Rooms used for video identification parades or similar.
- A room in which officers can complete arrest documentation after detainees have been legally and formally logged in as held in custody, often known as a "writing room".

== Procedure ==
Upon arrival at the suite, the police officer who has made an arrest presents the suspect at a desk before the custody sergeant, explaining the reason and details of the arrest and evidence gained. During their training, police officers are taught to use the ROAST acronym to brief the custody sergeant:

- R - Reason for arrest: The necessity criteria used to justify the arrest (e.g., to prevent loss of evidence, to protect a child/vulnerable person, or because the suspect's details were unknown).
- O - Offence: The specific law that has been broken (e.g., Theft, Common Assault, Public Order).
- A - Allegation: The summary of what the victim, witness, or reporting person claims happened.
- S - Summary of evidence: The facts of the case, including any direct quotes or replies the suspect made after being cautioned.
- T - Time and place of arrest: The exact time the handcuffs went on and the location of the incident.

If the custody officer is satisfied that the person has been lawfully detained, they will authorise detention. The detainee would then be asked questions regarding their personal details and informed of their rights whilst in custody under the Police and Criminal Evidence Act 1984 (PACE) or Criminal Procedure (Legal Assistance, Detention and Appeals) (Scotland) Act 2010 in Scotland.

=== Searching ===
Before being allocated a cell and a record being made of the initial time detained, the detainee is usually searched with any item they are carrying removed and in some cases retained if forensic evidence has to be preserved. Section 54 of PACE is the law related to searches at custody.

==== Further Searches ====
Under Section 55 of PACE and PACE Code C, an intimate search is a physical examination of a person's body orifices other than the mouth. Such a search may be authorised only by an officer of inspector rank or above, and only where the officer has reasonable grounds for believing that the detainee has concealed either an item that they could use to cause physical injury to themselves or others, or a Class A drug intended for supply or export. The officer must also have reasonable grounds for believing that an intimate search is the only way to remove the item.

Despite some portrayals in television dramas, strip searches in police custody do not normally require a detainee to remove all their clothing at the same time. Under PACE Code C, a strip search is a search involving the removal of more than outer clothing, but it must be conducted with regard to the detainee’s dignity, sensitivity and vulnerability. Where practicable, a detainee should be allowed to remove clothing above the waist and redress before removing further clothing.

If necessary, the detainee may be required to hold their arms in the air, or to stand with their legs apart and bend forward, so that a visual examination can be made of the genital and anal areas. No physical contact may be made with any body orifice during a strip search; if an item is found in a body orifice other than the mouth and the detainee refuses to hand it over, its removal would constitute an intimate search.

===== Notable strip-search cases in the United Kingdom =====
====== Child Q, 2020 ======
In December 2020, a 15-year-old schoolgirl, known publicly as Child Q, was strip-searched by Metropolitan Police officers at her school in Hackney, London, east London, after being wrongly suspected of carrying Cannabis (a Class B drug). A safeguarding review found that the search took place without an appropriate adult present and while Child Q was menstruating.

The case led to national scrutiny of police strip-search powers and safeguarding procedures for children.

====== Olivia, 2020 ======
In December 2020, another 15-year-old girl, reported under the pseudonym Olivia, was strip-searched by Metropolitan Police officers after being arrested in south London. The Independent Office for Police Conduct investigated a complaint that the search had been inappropriate.

Media reports stated that the case attracted further scrutiny because it emerged shortly after the Child Q case and involved another child strip search by the Metropolitan Police.

====== Greater Manchester Police custody inquiry, 2019-2023 ======
In 2024, the Baird Inquiry examined the treatment of women and girls in Greater Manchester Police custody, including the use of strip searches. The inquiry considered case studies from 2019 to 2023 and reported concerns about arrest, detention, dignity, vulnerability and the treatment of women and girls in custody.

Greater Manchester Police said the report identified issues around arrest, care for domestic and sexual abuse survivors, treatment in custody, use of strip search and complaints handling.

=== Property ===
Items of clothing and personal effects may be removed from a detainee and withheld by the custody officer where they are considered to present a risk, including a risk of self-harm, harm to others, escape, damage to property or interference with evidence. Such items may include belts, shoelaces, drawstrings or other articles that could be used as ligatures. Property taken from a detainee is recorded where required and held for safekeeping while the person remains in custody.

=== Further enquiries and custody outcome ===
After the detainee has been booked into custody, the investigating officer may complete arrest documentation and carry out further enquiries while detention remains authorised. These enquiries may include taking witness accounts, checking records, arranging forensic procedures, reviewing evidence and, where appropriate, conducting an interview with the suspect under caution. Interviews with suspects in police stations are normally audio and visually recorded in accordance with PACE Code E.

The detainee may be brought back before the custody officer for a decision on how the case should proceed. Depending on the evidence and the stage of the investigation, the custody officer may authorise continued detention, charge the person with an offence, release them on pre-charge bail, release them under investigation, or release them without further action.

In cases where a charging decision is required from the Crown Prosecution Service, the suspect may be released on bail or kept in detention where the legal grounds for continued detention are met.

=== Communication, legal advice and custody visits ===
Detainees are entitled to have one person informed of their arrest and detention, subject to limited statutory delays. They must also be informed that they may consult and communicate privately with a solicitor, whether in person, in writing or by telephone, and that free independent legal advice is available. Other telephone calls, messages and visits may be permitted, but are recorded and may be subject to the custody officer's discretion.

Independent custody visitor may make unannounced visits to custody suites to check on the treatment and welfare of detainees and the conditions in which they are held. The system is placed on a statutory footing by section 51 of the Police Reform Act 2002, which requires local policing bodies to make arrangements for detainees to be visited by independent custody visitors.

== Police custody suites associated with serious incidents ==
=== Queen's Gardens Police Station - death of Christopher Alder, 1998 ===
Christopher Alder died in the custody suite at Queen's Gardens Police Station in Hull on 1 April 1998. Alder, a 37-year-old former paratrooper, had been arrested after being taken to Hull Royal Infirmary following an assault. CCTV evidence showed him lying face down on the floor of the custody suite before his death.

=== Brixton Police Station - death of Sean Rigg, 2008 ===
Sean Rigg died at Brixton Police Station on 21 August 2008 after being detained by Metropolitan Police officers while experiencing mental ill health. He had been restrained in the prone position before being taken to the station, where he collapsed in the caged area at the entrance to the custody suite.

=== Heavitree Road custody unit - death of Thomas Orchard, 2012 ===
Thomas Orchard was arrested in Exeter on 3 October 2012 and taken to the Heavitree Road custody unit operated by Devon and Cornwall Police. During his detention, an emergency response belt was placed across his face while he was restrained. He was later found unresponsive in a cell and died in hospital on 10 October 2012.

=== Luton Police Station - death of Leon Briggs, 2013 ===
Leon Briggs died on 4 November 2013 after being restrained by Bedfordshire Police officers and taken to Luton Police Station under Section 136 of the Mental Health Act. He became unwell in custody and was later pronounced dead in hospital.

=== Croydon Custody Centre - murder of Matt Ratana, 2020 ===
Croydon Custody Centre, also known as Berin Underwood House, was the scene of the murder of Metropolitan Police sergeant Matt Ratana on 25 September 2020. Ratana was fatally shot inside the custody suite by Louis De Zoysa, who had been arrested and taken to the centre while handcuffed.

== See also ==
- Bail
- Criminal justice
- Due process
- Juvenile justice
- Penology
- Police custody (disambiguation)
- Police training
