= Bridget Cherry =

British architectural historian

Bridget Cherry OBE FSA Hon. FRIBA (born 17 May 1941) is a British architectural historian who was series editor of the Pevsner Architectural Guides from 1971 until 2002, and is the author or co-author of several volumes in the series.

== Family and education ==
Cherry is the elder sister of the neurosurgeon Henry Marsh. She studied history at Lady Margaret Hall, Oxford University, matriculating in 1960. She went on to study History of Art at the Courtauld Institute of Art, specialising in English Romanesque architecture.

== Career ==
=== Pevsner Architectural Guides ===
Cherry began work on the Buildings of England series as Nikolaus Pevsner's research assistant in 1968, and from 1971 to 2002 was the series editor. She revised several volumes including Surrey, Northamptonshire, Hertfordshire, Devon and Wiltshire, and authored or co-authored four of the London volumes (South, North-West, North and East).

=== Other interests ===
Cherry is vice-president of the Heritage of London Trust, a Council member of the London Topographical Society and a member of the board of the Ironbridge Heritage Trust. She is a life trustee of the Sir John Soane's Museum, London. Cherry previously served as a commissioner for English Heritage, the Royal Commission on Historical Monuments of England and as a trustee of Historic Royal Palaces. Following her retirement, she edits the London Topographical Society's newsletter.

== Honours and awards ==
Cherry was appointed a Member of the Order of the British Empire in 2003.

She is a Fellow of the Society of Antiquaries and since 1993 a Fellow of the Royal Institute of British Architects.

== Publications ==
=== Books ===
- Northamptonshire. (2nd ed.) revised by Bridget Cherry. With contributions from Sir Gyles Isham and Bruce Bailey, 1973, Harmondsworth: Penguin. ISBN 0140710221
- Dudmaston Shropshire: A souvenir guide / Bridget Cherry, 2018. Rotherham: National Trust. ISBN 9781911384366
- The buildings of England: a short history and bibliography / Bridget Cherry, 1983, Linton: Published for the Penguin Collectors' Society by Dalby. ISBN 0907049060
- Ivy-Mantled Tower: a history of the church and churchyard of St. Mary Hornsey, Middlesex / Bridget Cherry, 2015, London: Hornsey Historical Society. ISBN 9780905794532
- London. 2, South / Bridget Cherry and Nikolaus Pevsner 1994–2001, Harmondsworth: Penguin, ISBN 0300096518
- London. 4, North / Bridget Cherry & Nikolaus Pevsner, 2002, New Haven, Conn.; London: Yale University Press. ISBN 0300096534
- London. 3, North West / Bridget Cherry and Nikolaus Pevsner, 2002, New Haven, Conn.; London: Yale University Press. ISBN 0300096526
- The Buildings of England, Ireland, Scotland and Wales: a short history and bibliography / Bridget Cherry, 1998, [Great Britain]: Penguin Collectors' Society. ISBN 0952740117
- London. 5, East / Bridget Cherry, Charles O'Brien and Nikolaus Pevsner; with contributions from Elizabeth Williamson, Malcolm Tucker and Pamela Greenwood. 2005, New Haven, Conn.; London: Yale University Press. ISBN 0300107013
- Dissent and the gothic revival: papers from a study day at Union Chapel Islington / edited by Bridget Cherry. 2007, London: The Chapels Society. ISBN 9780954506117
- Hornsey Town Hall / Bridget Cherry, 1995, London: Hornsey Historical Society
- Civic pride in Hornsey: the Town Hall and its surrounding buildings / Bridget Cherry. c.2006, London: Hornsey Historical Society. ISBN 0905794389
- Crouch End: a walk / Bridget Cherry and Ken Gay; illustrated by Peter Garland. 1995, London: Hornsey Historical Society. ISBN 0905794133

=== Articles ===
- Bridget Cherry and Ken Gay, Crouch End, A Walk. (1995). The London Journal: A Review of Metropolitan Society past and Present, 20(2), 126. Journal ISSN 0305-8034
- Cherry, Bridget. (2019). BOOK REVIEW: THE ANTIQUARIES JOURNAL. The Antiquaries Journal, 99, 465. Journal ISSN 0003-5815;
- Cherry, Bridget, Rawcliffe, Carole, Shoemaker, Robert B., & Darby, Nell. (2014). Survey of London, Volume 49, Battersea, Part I: Public Commercial and Cultural. The London Journal, 39, 168–174. Journal ISSN 0305-8034;
- Cherry, Bridget, "London's Public Events and Ceremonies: an Overview Through Three Centuries". Architectural History, vol. 56, 2013, pp. 1–28. JSTOR
- Cherry, Bridget, and Nikolaus Pevsner. "The Modern Movement in Britain". Twentieth Century Architecture, no. 8, 2007, pp. 12–38. JSTOR,
- Cherry, Bridget. "Edward Hatton's New View of London". Architectural History, vol. 44, 2001, pp. 96–105. JSTOR,
- Cherry, Bridget. "An Early Sixteenth-Century London Tomb Design". Architectural History, vol. 27, 1984, pp. 86–95. JSTOR,

=== As contributor ===
- The buildings of England: further reading: a select bibliography / compiled by Tye Blackshaw, Bridget Cherry, Elisabeth Williamson.
- Northamptonshire / Bruce Bailey, Nikolaus Pevsner and Bridget Cherry. 2013, New Haven: Yale University Press. ISBN 9780300185072
- The best buildings of England / Nikolaus Pevsner; an anthology by Bridget Cherry and John Newman; with an introduction by John Newman, 1986, [Harmondsworth]: Viking. ISBN 0670812838
- The buildings of England: a celebration / edited by Simon Bradley and Bridget Cherry, 2001. Beccles: The Penguin Collectors' Society for the Buildings Books Trust. ISBN 0952740133
- Bristol / Andrew Foyle; with contributions by Bridget Cherry, 2004, New Haven, Conn.; London: Yale University Press. ISBN 0300104421
- Hertfordshire / James Bettley, Nikolaus Pevsner and Bridget Cherry; with contributions from Stewart Bryant, Lee Prosser and Alec Clifton-Taylor, 2019, New Haven: Yale University Press. ISBN 9780300223903

=== Photography ===
Cherry contributed photographs to the Conway Library, a collection of images of architectural interest now held by the Courtauld Institute of Art.
