= Amberley Publishing =

British publishing company

- Founded: 2008
- Country of origin: United Kingdom
- Headquarters location: Stroud, England
- Key people: Nick Hayward (chief executive)
- Publication types: Books
- Nonfiction topics: Transport, history
- Fiction genres: Non-fiction
- Official website: www.amberley-books.com

Amberley Publishing is a firm of publishers in Stroud, Gloucestershire, England, which specialises in non-fiction transport and history books. They were established in 2008 and the chief executive is Nick Hayward, who previously worked at AudioGo and Simon & Schuster.

The firm has a catalogue of around 3,000 titles including the "Through Time" series of colour local history books.

In 2016, it was announced that Amberley had partnered with Yad Vashem Publications to publish titles about the Holocaust in the United Kingdom. In 2018, they published Women's Experiences in the Holocaust by Agnes Grunwald-Spier which was launched at the Wiener Library for the Study of the Holocaust and Genocide.

The firm are the sponsors of the National History Book Competition.
