= Death of Ian Tomlinson =

London man killed by Met. Police in 2009

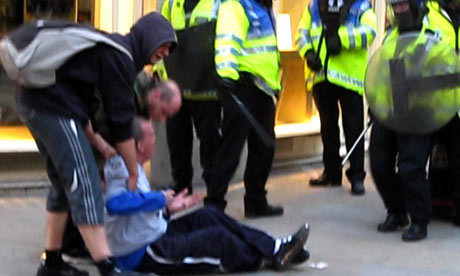
- Ian Tomlinson remonstrates with police after being pushed to the ground, minutes before his death.
- Date: 1 April 2009
- Location: Cornhill, City of London
- Reporter: Paul Lewis, The Guardian
- Charges: PC Simon Harwood; Manslaughter, May 2011
- Trial: 18 June – 19 July 2012; Southwark Crown Court
- Verdict: Not guilty
- Awards: Bevins Prize for outstanding investigative journalism, and Reporter of the Year, for Paul Lewis
- Footage: First video, published by The Guardian

Ian Tomlinson (7 February 1962 – 1 April 2009) was a newspaper vendor who collapsed and died in the City of London after being struck by a police officer during the 2009 G20 London summit protests. After an inquest jury returned a verdict of unlawful killing, the officer, Simon Harwood, was prosecuted for manslaughter. He was found not guilty but was dismissed from the police service for gross misconduct. Following civil proceedings, the Metropolitan Police Service paid Tomlinson's family an undisclosed sum and acknowledged that Harwood's actions had caused Tomlinson's death.

The first post-mortem concluded that Tomlinson had suffered a heart attack, but a week later The Guardian published a video of Harwood, a constable with London's Metropolitan Police, striking Tomlinson with a baton from behind, across the right hand side of his abdomen, then pushing him to the ground. Tomlinson was not a protester, and at the time he was struck he was trying to make his way home through the police cordons. He walked a short distance after the incident, but collapsed and died several minutes later.

After the Independent Police Complaints Commission (IPCC) began a criminal inquiry, further post-mortems indicated that Tomlinson had died from internal bleeding caused by blunt force trauma to the abdomen, in association with cirrhosis of the liver. The Crown Prosecution Service (CPS) decided not to charge Harwood, because the disagreement between the first and later pathologists meant they could not show a causal link between the death and alleged assault. That position changed in 2011; after the verdict of unlawful killing, the CPS charged Harwood with manslaughter. He was acquitted in 2012 and dismissed from the service a few months later.

Tomlinson's death sparked a debate in the UK about the relationship between the police, media and public, and the independence of the IPCC. In response to the concerns, the Chief Inspector of Constabulary, Denis O'Connor, published a 150-page report in November 2009 that aimed to restore Britain's consent-based model of policing. PC Simon Harwood had previously been a constable in the Avon & Somerset Constabulary, but had resigned days before a misconduct hearing against him, arising from a complaint of excessive violence used during a road rage incident.

== Background ==
=== Ian Tomlinson ===
Tomlinson was born to Jim and Ann Tomlinson in Matlock, Derbyshire. He moved to London when he was 17 to work as a scaffolder. At the time of his death, at the age of 47, he was working casually as a vendor for the Evening Standard, London's evening newspaper. Married twice with nine children, including stepchildren, Tomlinson had a history of alcoholism, as a result of which he had been living apart from his second wife, Julia, for 13 years, and had experienced long periods of homelessness. From 2008 onwards, Tomlinson had been staying in the Lindsey Hotel, a shelter for the homeless on Lindsey Street, Smithfield, EC1. At the time of his death, he was walking across London's financial district in an effort to reach the Lindsey Hotel, his way hampered at several points by police lines. The route he took was his usual way home from a newspaper stand on Fish Street Hill outside Monument tube station, where he worked with a friend, Barry Smith.

=== London police, IPCC ===
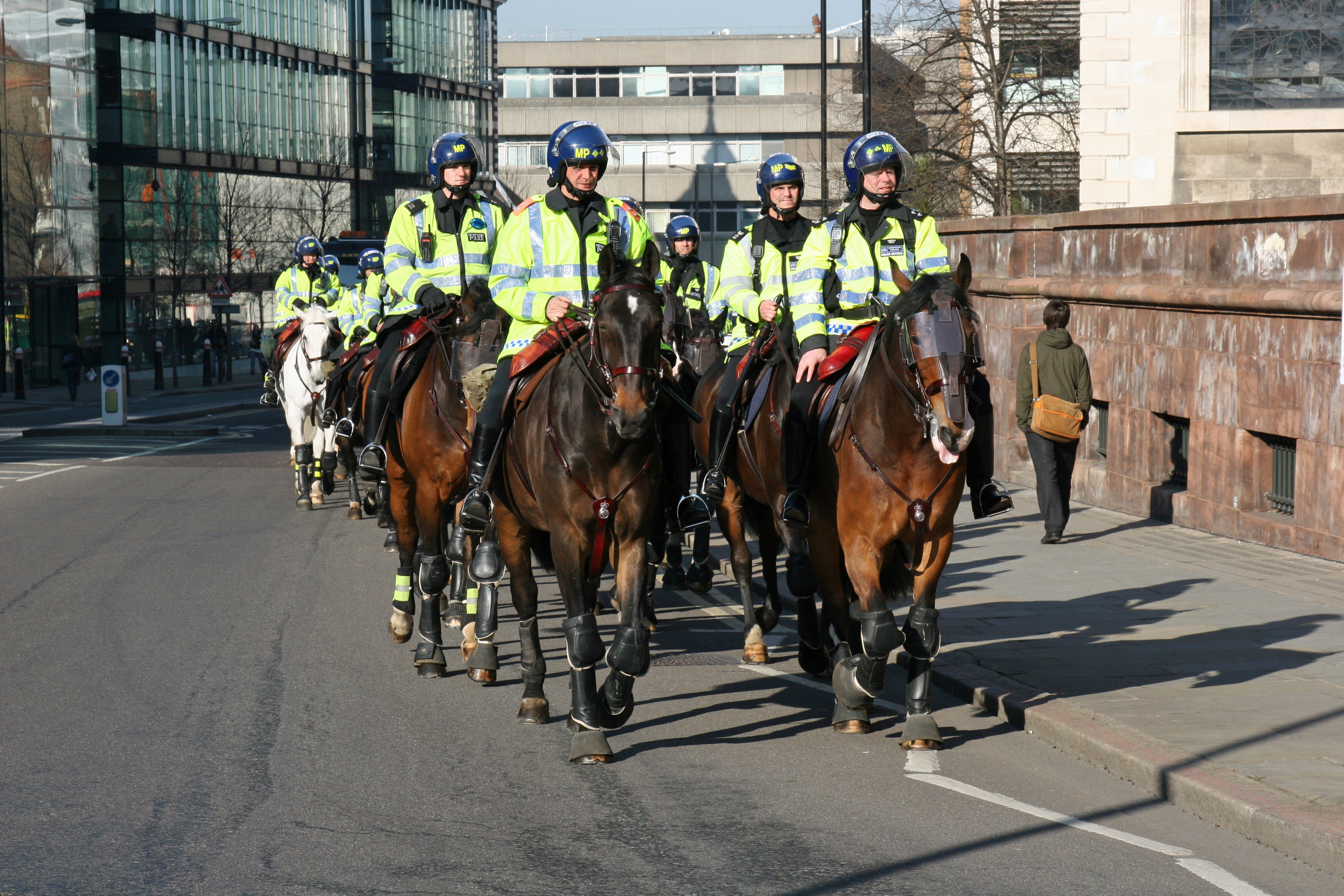
Mounted police during the 2009 protests

With over 31,000 officers at the time, the Metropolitan Police Service (the Met) was the largest police force in the United Kingdom, responsible for policing Greater London (except for the financial district, the City of London, which has its own force, the City of London Police). The Met's commissioner at the time was Sir Paul Stephenson; the City of London Police commissioner was Mike Bowron. Responsibility for supervising the Met falls to the Metropolitan Police Authority, chaired by the Mayor of London, at the time Boris Johnson.

The officer seen pushing Tomlinson was a constable with the Met's Territorial Support Group (TSG), identified by the "U" on their shoulder numbers. The TSG specializes in public-order policing, wearing military-style helmets, flame-retardant overalls, stab vests and balaclavas. Their operational commander at the time was Chief Superintendent Mick Johnson. (Note: The Territorial Support Group is the successor to the Special Patrol Group (SPG), known for its alleged involvement in the 1979 death in London of a protester, Blair Peach.)

The Independent Police Complaints Commission (IPCC) began to operate in 2004; its chair when Tomlinson died was Nick Hardwick. Created by the Police Reform Act 2002, the commission replaced the Police Complaints Authority (PCA) following public dissatisfaction with the latter's relationship with the police. Unlike the PCA, the IPCC operates independently of the Home Office, which is the Government department responsible for criminal justice and policing in England and Wales.

=== Operation Glencoe ===
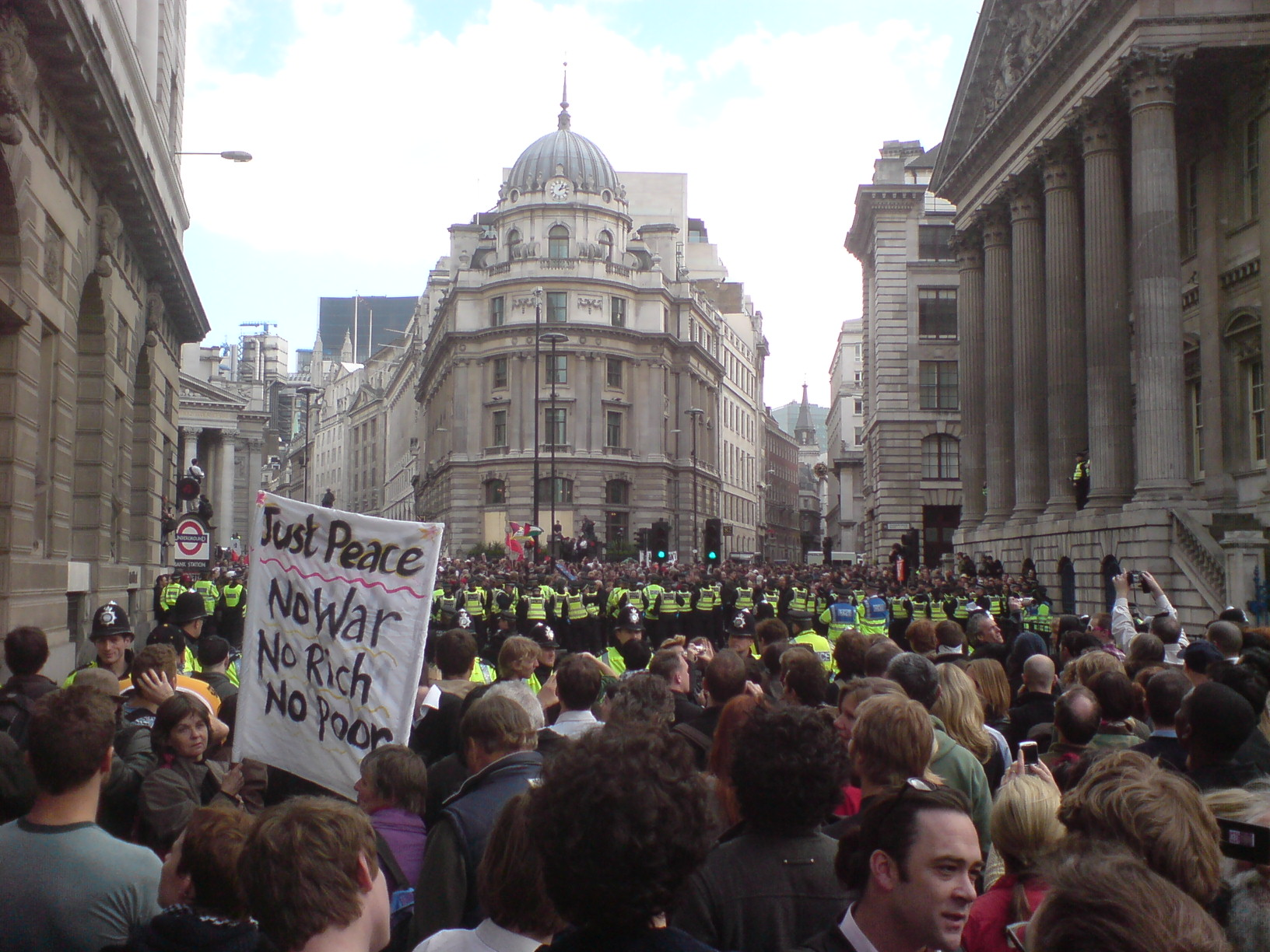
Outside the Bank of England, 1 April 2009

The G20 security operation, codenamed "Operation Glencoe", was a "Benbow operation", which meant the Met, City of London Police and the British Transport Police worked under one Gold commander, in this case Bob Broadhurst of the Met. (Note: The Guardian reported speculation among protesters that the operation had been named after the 1692 Glencoe massacre. A spokesman for the Met said before the protests that the police were "up for it"; the service said he had been quoted out of context. Protesters escalated the rhetoric, saying they hoped to take control of central London, amid references to bankers being lynched.)

There were six protests on 1 April 2009: a security operation at ExCeL London, a Stop the War march, a Free Tibet protest outside the Chinese Embassy, a People & Planet protest, a Climate Camp protest, and a protest outside the Bank of England. Over 4,000 protesters were at the Climate Camp and the same number at the Bank of England. On 1 April over 5,500 police officers were deployed and the following day 2,800, at a cost of £7.2 million. Officers worked 14-hour shifts. They ended at midnight, slept on the floor of police stations, were not given a chance to eat, and were back on duty at 7 am. This was viewed as having contributed to the difficulties they faced.

The Bank of England protesters were held in place from 12:30 pm until 7:00 pm using a process police called "containment" and the media called "kettling"—corralling protesters into small spaces until the police dispersed them. At 7:00 pm senior officers decided that "reasonable force" could be used to disperse the protesters around the bank. Between 7:10 and 7:40 pm the crowd surged toward the police, missiles were thrown, and the police pushed back with their shields. Scuffles broke out and arrests were made. This was the situation Tomlinson wandered into as he tried to make his way home.

== Incident ==
=== Earlier encounter with police ===
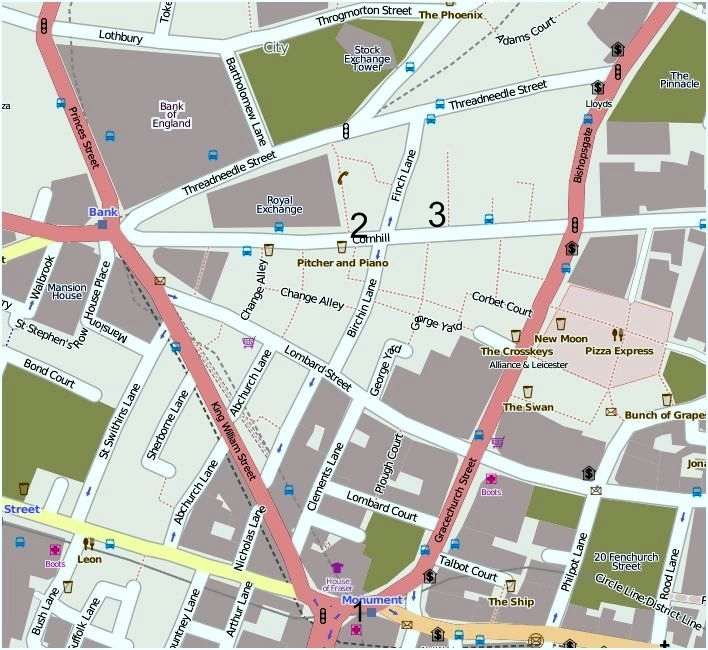
Map of the City of London. Numbers mark where Ian Tomlinson was allegedly assaulted on 1 April 2009: 1. 19:00: Tomlinson left Bank–Monument station; 2. c. 19:20: He was struck in Royal Exchange Passage; 3. 19:22: He collapsed outside 77 Cornhill

Several newspapers published images of Tomlinson's first encounter with police that evening. According to Barry Smith, Tomlinson left the newspaper stand outside Monument Tube Station at around 7:00 pm. An eyewitness, IT worker Ross Hardy, said Tomlinson was on Lombard Street, drunk and refusing to move; a police van nudged him on the back of the legs, Hardy said, and when that did not work he was moved by four police officers wearing personal protective equipment. On 16 April The Guardian published three images of Tomlinson on Lombard Street.

Tomlinson stayed on Lombard Street for another half-hour, then made his way to King William Street, toward two lines of police cordons, where police had "kettled" thousands of protesters near the Bank of England. At 7:10 pm he doubled back on himself, walking up and down Change Alley where he encountered more cordons. Five minutes later he was on Lombard Street again, crossed it, walked down Birchin Lane, and reached Cornhill at 7:10–7:15 pm.

A few minutes later Tomlinson was at the northern end of a pedestrian precinct, Royal Exchange Passage (formally called Royal Exchange Buildings), near the junction with Threadneedle Street, where a further police cordon stopped him from proceeding. He turned to walk south along Royal Exchange Passage instead, where, minutes before he arrived, officers had clashed with up to 25 protesters. Riot police from the Met's TSG, accompanied by City of London police dog handlers, had arrived there from the cordon in Threadneedle Street to help their colleagues.

=== Encounter with officer ===
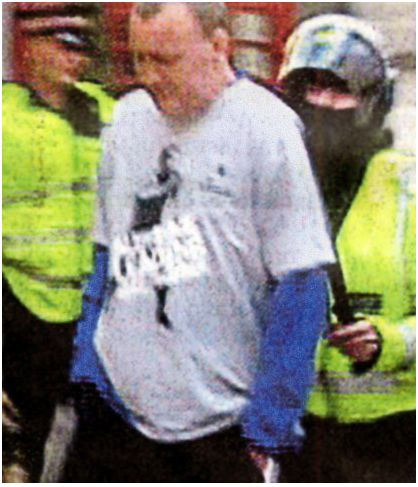
Harwood behind Tomlinson

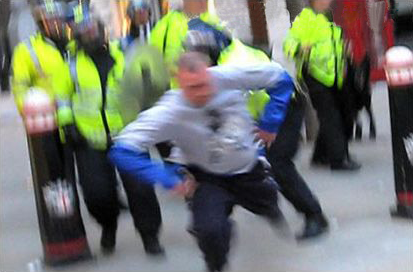
Tomlinson falls

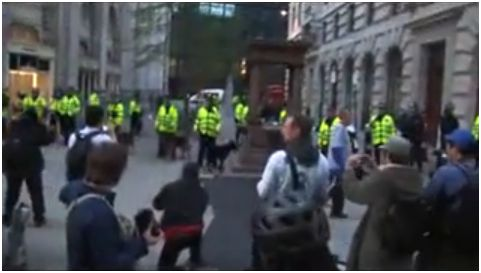
In a separate video, Tomlinson walks away after being struck.

Police officers followed Tomlinson as he walked 50 yards (46 m) along the street. He headed towards Threadneedle Street, but again ran into police cordons and doubled back on himself towards Cornhill. According to a CPS report, he was bitten on the leg by a police dog at 7:15 pm, when a dog handler tried to move him out of the way, but he appeared not to react to it.

The same group of officers approached Tomlinson outside a Montblanc store at the southern end of Royal Exchange Passage, near the junction with Cornhill. He was walking slowly with his hands in his pockets; according to an eyewitness, he was saying that he was trying to get home.

The first Guardian video shows one officer lunge at Tomlinson from behind, strike him across the legs with a baton and push him back, causing him to fall. On 8 April Channel 4 News released their own footage, which showed the officer's arm swing back to head height before bringing it down to hit Tomlinson on the legs with the baton. Another video obtained by The Guardian on 21 April shows Tomlinson standing by a bicycle rack, hands in his pockets, when the police approach him. After he is hit, he can be seen scraping along the ground on the right side of his forehead; eyewitnesses spoke of hearing a noise as his head hit the ground.

=== Collapse ===
Tomlinson can be seen briefly remonstrating with police as he sits on the ground. None of the officers offered assistance. After being helped to his feet by a protester, Tomlinson walked 200 feet (60 m) along Cornhill, where he collapsed at around 7:22 pm outside 77 Cornhill. Witnesses say he appeared dazed, eyes rolling, skin grey. They also said he smelled of alcohol. An ITV News photographer tried to give medical aid, but was forced away by police, as was a medical student. Police medics attended to Tomlinson, who was pronounced dead on arrival at hospital.

== Simon Harwood ==
=== Background ===
Simon Harwood, the officer who unlawfully killed Tomlinson, was a police constable with the Territorial Support Group (TSG) at Larkhall Lane police station in Lambeth, South London. Harwood had faced 10 complaints in 12 years, nine of which had been dismissed or unproven. The complaint that was upheld involved unlawful access to the Police National Computer. The complaints included a road rage incident in or around 1998 while he was on sick leave, during which he reportedly tried to arrest the other driver, who alleged that Harwood had used unnecessary force. On Friday 14 September 2001, before the case was heard by a discipline board, Harwood retired on medical grounds. Three days later, on Monday 17 September, he rejoined the Met as a civilian computer worker.

In May 2003 Harwood joined the Surrey Police as a constable. Surrey Police said he was frank about his history. In January 2004 he was alleged to have assaulted a man during a raid on a home. In November 2004, on his request, Harwood was transferred back to the Met. There were three more complaints after that, before the incident with Tomlinson.

=== On the day ===
Harwood was involved in several confrontations on the day of Tomlinson's death. He had been on duty since 5 am, assigned as a driver, and had spent most of the day in his vehicle. While parked on Cornhill in the evening, he saw a man write "all cops are bastards" on the side of another police van, and left his vehicle to attempt to arrest the man. The suspect resisted arrest and the suspect's head collided with a van door, triggering a response from the crowd that made Harwood believe it was unsafe to return to his vehicle. He told the inquest that he had been hit on the head, had fallen over, lost his baton, had been attacked by the crowd and feared for his life, but later acknowledged this had not happened.

Shortly after his attempted arrest of the graffiti man, Harwood swung a coat at a protester, pulled a BBC cameraman to the ground, used a palm strike against one man, and at 7:19 pm pushed another man to the ground for allegedly threatening a police dog handler. It was seconds after this that he saw Tomlinson standing with his hands in his pockets beside a bicycle rack, being told by police to move away. Harwood told the inquest he made a "split-second decision" that there was justification for engagement, then struck Tomlinson on the thigh with his baton and pushed him to the ground. He said it was a "very poor push" and he had been shocked when Tomlinson fell. Harwood made no mention of the incident in his notebook; he told the inquest he had forgotten about it.

=== Identification ===
Newspapers did not release Harwood's name until July 2010. On the day of the incident, he appeared to have removed his shoulder number and covered the bottom of his face with his balaclava. Simon Israel of Channel 4 News reported a detailed description of the officer on 22 April 2009; the IPCC sought but failed to obtain an injunction to prevent Channel 4 broadcasting the description, alleging that it might prejudice their inquiry. Fifteen months later, when announcing in July 2010 that no charges would be brought against Harwood, the Crown Prosecution Service still referred to him as "PC A." It was only on that day that newspapers decided to name him.

Harwood said he first realized on 8 April, when he saw the Guardian video, that Tomlinson had died. He reportedly collapsed at home and had to be taken to hospital by ambulance. Harwood and three colleagues made themselves known to the IPCC that day.

== Early accounts ==
=== First police statement ===
The Met issued its first statement on 1 April at 11:36 pm, four hours after Tomlinson died, a statement approved by the IPCC's regional director for London. The statement said that police had been alerted that a man had collapsed and were attacked by "a number of missiles" as they tried to save his life, an allegation that was inaccurate, according to later media reports. (Note: Metropolitan Police Service, 1 April 2009, 23:36 hours: "A member of the public went to a police officer on a cordon in Birchin Lane, junction with Cornhill to say that there was a man who had collapsed round the corner. That officer sent two police medics through the cordon line and into St Michaels Alley where they found a man who had stopped breathing. They called for LAS support at about 1930. The officers gave him an initial check and cleared his airway before moving him back behind the cordon line to a clear area outside the Royal Exchange Building where they gave him CPR. The officers took the decision to move him as during this time a number of missiles – believed to be bottles – were being thrown at them. LAS took the man to hospital where he was pronounced dead.")

According to Nick Davies in The Guardian, the statement was the result of an intense argument in the Met's press office, after an earlier draft had been rejected. He wrote that both the Met and IPCC said the statement represented the truth as they understood it at the time, and that there had been no allegation at that point that Tomlinson had come into contact with police. Davies asked why the IPCC were involved if they had not realized there had been police contact. He alleged that senior sources within the Met said privately that the assault on Tomlinson had been spotted by the police control room at Cobalt Street in south London, and that a chief inspector on the ground had also reported it. The Met issued a statement saying they had checked with every chief inspector who had been part of Operation Glencoe, and that none of them had called in such a report. (Note: The IPCC's guidelines at the time said that incidents should be referred to them where "persons have died or been seriously injured following some form of direct or indirect contact with the police and there is reason to believe that the contact may have caused or contributed to the death or serious injury".)

=== First eyewitness accounts ===
On 2 April the Met handed responsibility for the investigation to the City of London police; the officer in charge was Detective Superintendent Anthony Crampton. After police briefings, the Evening Standard reported on 2 April that "police were bombarded with bricks, bottles and planks of wood" as they tried to save Tomlinson, forced by a barrage of missiles to carry him to a safe location to give him mouth-to-mouth resuscitation.

Eyewitnesses said the story was inaccurate. They said protesters had provided first aid and telephoned for medical help. Others said that one or two plastic bottles had been thrown by people unaware of Tomlinson's situation, but other protesters had told them to stop. According to The Times, an analysis of television footage and photographs showed just one bottle, probably plastic, being thrown. Video taken by eyewitness Nabeela Zahir, published by The Guardian on 9 April, shows one protester shouting, "There is someone hurt here. Back the fuck up." Another voice says, "There's someone hurt. Don't throw anything."

=== Officers report the incident ===
First report

Officers who reported the incident

— The Guardian, 9 May 2011

Three police constables from the Hammersmith and Fulham police station—Nicholas Jackson, Andrew Moore, and Kerry Smith—told their supervisor, Inspector Wynne Jones, on 3 April that they had witnessed the incident. They can be seen in The Guardian video standing next to Tomlinson. Jackson was the first to tell the inspector; officers then contacted Moore and Smith, who had been standing next to Jackson at the time.

Jackson, Moore and Smith did not recognize Simon Harwood, the officer who struck Tomlinson, and according to the newspaper assumed he was with the City of London police. This was four days before The Guardian published the video. The inspector passed this information at 4:15 pm on 3 April to Detective Inspector Eddie Hall, the Met's point of contact for Tomlinson's death. Hall said he passed it to the City of London police before the first post-mortem was conducted that day by Freddy Patel, which according to The Guardian began at 5:00 pm.

== Post-mortem examinations ==
An inquest was opened on 9 April 2009 by Paul Matthews, the City of London coroner. Three post-mortems were conducted: on 3 April by Mohmed Saeed Sulema "Freddy" Patel for Paul Matthews; on 9 April by Nathaniel Cary for the IPCC and Tomlinson's family; and on 22 April jointly by Kenneth Shorrock for the Metropolitan police and Ben Swift for Simon Harwood. The coroner was criticized for reportedly having failed to allow IPCC investigators to attend the first, and for failing to tell Tomlinson's family that they had a legal right to attend or send a representative. The family also said he had not told them where and when it was taking place.

=== First post-mortem ===
According to Detective Sergeant Chandler of the City of London police, he was not told until the first post-mortem was over, or at an advanced stage, that three police officers had seen another officer hit and push Tomlinson. Apparently, neither Patel nor the IPCC were told about the three witnesses. Patel said he was told only that the case was a "suspicious death"; the police had asked that he "rule out any assault or crush injuries associated with public order".

Patel concluded that Tomlinson had died of coronary artery disease. His report noted "intraabdominal fluid blood about 3l with small blood clot", which was interpreted by medical experts to mean that he had found three litres of blood in Tomlinson's abdomen. This would have been around 60 per cent of Tomlinson's total blood volume, a "highly significant indicator of the cause of death", according to the Crown Prosecution Service (CPS). In a report for the CPS a year later, on 5 April 2010, Patel wrote that he had meant "intraabdominal fluid with blood". He did not retain samples of the fluid for testing. This issue became pivotal regarding the decision not to prosecute Harwood. The City of London police issued a statement on 4 April: "A post-mortem examination found he died of natural causes. [He] suffered a sudden heart attack while on his way home from work."

The IPCC told reporters that the post-mortem showed no bruising or scratches on Tomlinson's head and shoulders. When the family asked the City of London police, after the post-mortem, whether there had been marks on Tomlinson's body, they were told no; according to The Guardian, Detective Superintendent Anthony Crampton, who was leading the investigation, wrote in his log that he did not tell the family about a bruise and puncture marks on Tomlinson's leg to avoid causing "unnecessary stress or alarm". On 5 April The Observer published the first photograph of Tomlinson lying on the ground next to riot police. After it was published, Freddy Patel was asked to return to the mortuary, where he made a note of bruising on Tomlinson's head that he had not noticed when he first examined him. On 24 April Sky News obtained an image of Tomlinson after he collapsed, which showed bruising on the right side of his forehead.

=== Second and third post-mortem ===
The IPCC removed the Tomlinson inquiry from the City of London police on 8 April. A second post-mortem, ordered jointly by the IPCC and Tomlinson's family, was carried out that day by Nathaniel Cary, known for his work on high-profile cases. Cary found that Tomlinson had died because of internal bleeding from blunt force trauma to the abdomen, in association with cirrhosis of the liver. He concluded that Tomlinson had fallen on his elbow, which he said "impacted in the area of his liver causing an internal bleed which led to his death a few minutes later".

Because of the conflicting conclusions of the first two, a third post-mortem was conducted on 22 April by Kenneth Shorrock on behalf of the Metropolitan police, and Ben Swift on behalf of Simon Harwood. Shorrock and Swift agreed with the results of the second post-mortem. The Met's point of contact for Tomlinson's death, Detective Inspector Eddie Hall, told the pathologists before the final post-mortem that Tomlinson had fallen to the ground in front of a police van earlier in the evening, although there was no evidence that this had happened. The IPCC ruled in May 2011 that Hall had been reckless in making this claim, but had not intended to mislead.

=== Freddy Patel ===
At the time of Tomlinson's death, Patel was on the Home Office's register of accredited forensic pathologists. He qualified as a doctor at the University of Zambia in 1974, and registered to practice in the UK in 1988. The Metropolitan Police had written to the Home Office in 2005 raising concerns about his work. At the time of Tomlinson's death he did not have a contract with the police to conduct post-mortems in cases of suspicious death.

In 1999, Patel was disciplined by the General Medical Council (GMC) for having released medical details about Roger Sylvester, a man who had died in police custody. Outside of the inquest, Patel had told reporters: "Mr Sylvester was a user of crack cocaine."

In 2002, the police dropped a criminal inquiry because Patel said the victim, Sally White, had died of a heart attack with no signs of violence, although she was reportedly found naked with bruising to her body, an injury to her head and a bite mark on her thigh. Anthony Hardy, a mentally ill alcoholic who lived in the flat in which her body was found locked in a bedroom, later murdered two women and placed their body parts in bin bags. The police investigated Patel in relation to that postmortem, but the investigation was dropped. In response to the criticism, Patel said the GMC reprimand was a long time ago, and that his findings in the Sally White case had not been contested.

In July 2009 Patel was suspended from the government's register of pathologists, pending a GMC inquiry. The inquiry concerned 26 charges related to postmortems in four other cases. In one case Patel was accused of having failed to spot signs of abuse on the body of a five-year-old girl who had died after a fall at home, and of having failed to check with the hospital about its investigation into her injuries. The child's body was exhumed for a second postmortem, and her mother was convicted. The hearings concluded in August 2010; Patel was suspended for three months for "deficient professional performance".

In May 2011, the GMC opened an investigation into his handling of the Tomlinson post-mortem. He was struck off the medical register in August 2012.

== Images ==
=== Observer photograph ===
First photograph

Tomlinson on the ground

— The Observer, 5 April 2009

On 5 April The Observer (the Guardian's sister paper) published the first photograph of Tomlinson lying on the ground next to riot police. Over the next few days the IPCC told reporters that Tomlinson's family were not surprised that he had had a heart attack. When journalists asked whether he had been in contact with police officers before his death, they were told the speculation would upset the family.

=== Guardian video ===
The first Guardian video was shot on a digital camera by an investment fund manager from New York who was in London on business, and who attended the protests out of curiosity. On his way to Heathrow airport, he realized that the man he had filmed being assaulted was the man who had reportedly died of a heart attack. At that point, 2 am on 7 April, he passed his footage to The Guardian, which published it on its website that afternoon. The newspaper passed a copy to the IPCC, which opened a criminal inquiry.

=== Channel 4 video ===
A video by Ken McCallum, a cameraman for Channel 4 News, was broadcast on 8 April. Shot from a different angle, the footage shows Harwood draw his arm back to head height before bringing the baton down on Tomlinson's legs. McCallum was filming another incident at the time; the Tomlinson incident was unfolding in the background, unseen by the journalists but recorded by the camera. Half an hour later Alex Thomson, chief correspondent of Channel 4 News, was doing a live broadcast when the camera was damaged. It took engineers days to recover the tape, which is when they saw that Tomlinson's assault was on it.

=== Nabeela Zahir video ===
On 9 April The Guardian published footage from Nabeela Zahir, a freelance journalist, showing Tomlinson after his collapse. The police can be seen moving away at least one woman who tried to help him, and a man, Daniel McPhee, who was on the phone to the ambulance services. The footage shows that the Met's initial claim that there had been a barrage of missiles from protesters while police tried to save Tomlinson was inaccurate. Protesters can be heard calling for calm; one shouts "Don't throw anything." According to The Guardian, 56 seconds into the video, three officers can be seen with their face masks pulled halfway up their faces.

=== Cornhill video ===
The Guardian obtained a four-minute video on 21 April from an anonymous bystander who had been filming on Cornhill between 7:10 and 7:30 pm. The footage shows Tomlinson standing behind a bicycle rack in Royal Exchange Passage with his hands in his pockets, and a group of advancing police officers. When a police dog approaches him, he turns his back. At that point, he is hit on the legs and pushed by the TSG constable, and can be seen scraping along the ground on the right side of his forehead. Eyewitnesses said they heard a noise as his head hit the ground. The IPCC sought an injunction against the broadcast of the video by Channel 4 News, but a judge rejected the application. An image obtained by Sky News on 24 April appears to show bruising on the right side of Tomlinson's forehead. A head injury was recorded by the second and third pathologists.

=== CCTV cameras ===
Nick Hardwick, chair of the IPCC, said on 9 April that there were no CCTV cameras in the area. On 14 April the Evening Standard wrote that it had found at least six CCTV cameras in the area around the assault. After photographs of the cameras were published, the IPCC reversed its position and said its investigators were looking at footage from cameras in Threadneedle Street near the corner of Royal Exchange Passage.

== Early reaction and analysis ==
=== British policing ===
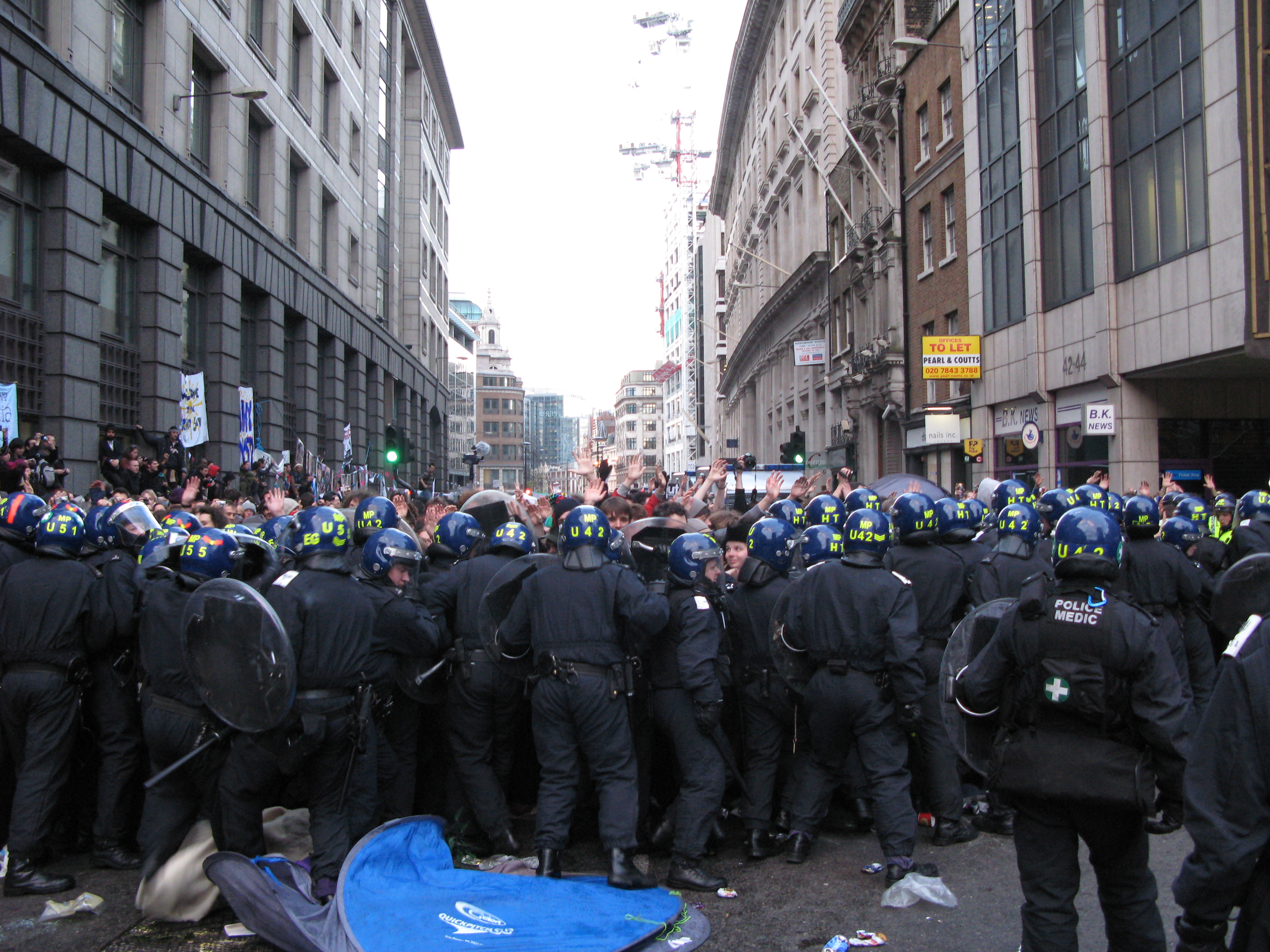
Climate Camp, Bishopsgate, 1 April 2009

Tomlinson's death sparked a discussion about the nature of Britain's policing and the relationship between the police, public, media and IPCC. The mayor of London, Boris Johnson, dismissed the criticism of the police as "an orgy of cop bashing". The death was compared to others that had each acted as a watershed in the public's perception of policing, including that of Blair Peach (1979), Stephen Lawrence (1993) and Jean Charles de Menezes (2005). The IPCC was criticized for having taken seven days from Tomlinson's death, and five days after hearing evidence that police may have been involved, to remove the City of London police from the investigation. (Note: The IPCC had been criticized before for not being responsive to public concerns. On 11 January 2008, the Police Action Law Group (over 100 lawyers who specialize in police complaints) resigned from the IPCC's advisory body, citing a failure to provide adequate oversight; a pattern of favouritism towards the police, with complaints being turned down despite strong evidence; indifference and rudeness towards complainants; delays stretching over several years; and key decisions being made by managers with little or no legal training or relevant experience. They wrote to Hardwick that there was "increasing dismay and disillusionment" at the "consistently poor quality of decision-making at all levels of the IPCC". Hardwick responded that some of the examples cited were the legacy of the previous oversight body, the Police Complaints Authority. He acknowledged that the IPCC struggled, shortly after it was set up in 2004, to cope with the number of cases it had inherited. Denied that there was any pattern of favouritism toward the police, he said the IPCC robustly defends its independence and impartiality.)

David Gilbertson, a former assistant inspector who had worked for the Home Office formulating policing policy, told The New York Times that the British police used to act with the sanction of the public, but that tactics had changed after a series of violent assaults on officers in the 1990s. Now dressing in military-style uniforms and equipped with anti-stab vests, extendable metal batons and clubs that turn into handcuffs, an entire generation of officers has come to regard the public as the enemy, the newspaper said.

=== The Guardian, police and IPCC ===
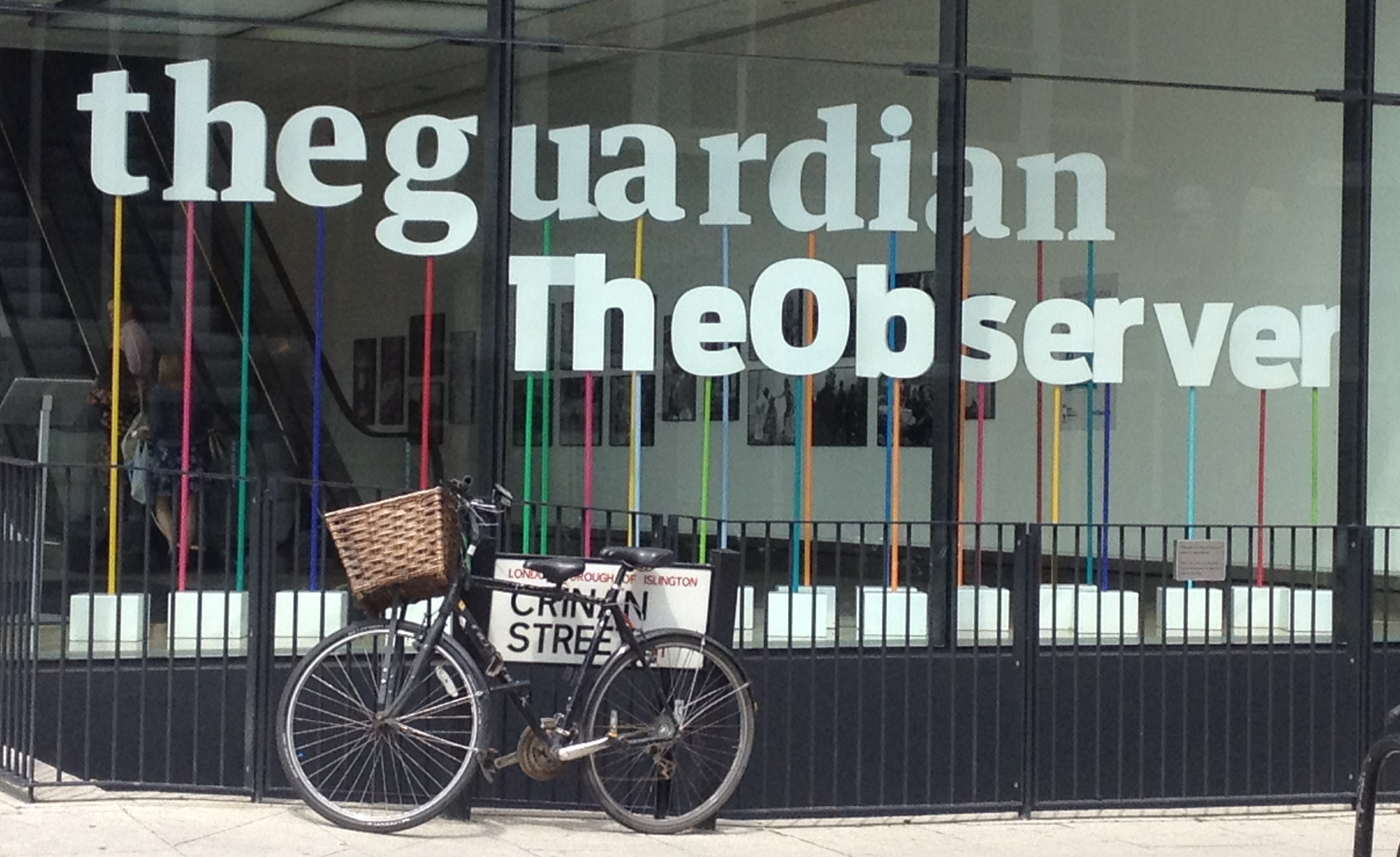
Offices of The Guardian and The Observer

Tomlinson's death was confirmed in a statement that accused protesters of having hampered police efforts to save his life. His family were not told he had died until nine hours after his death. The police and IPCC told journalists that his family were not surprised to hear he had had a heart attack. Journalists who asked whether police had had any contact with Tomlinson were asked not to speculate in case it upset the family. Direct contact with the family was refused. The police issued a statement on behalf of the family instead, which said the police were keeping them informed.

The Observer (The Guardian's sister paper) published an image of Tomlinson on the ground on Sunday, 5 April. That morning Tomlinson's family attended the scene of his death, where they met Paul Lewis, a Guardian reporter who had worked on The Observer story. Tomlinson's wife said this meeting was the first the family had heard of police contact with Tomlinson before his death. The family's police liaison officer later approached the newspaper to say he was "extremely unhappy" that Lewis had spoken to the family, and that the newspaper had to stay away from them for 48 hours. The IPCC accused the newspaper of "doorstepping the family at a time of grief". On the same day, the IPCC briefed other journalists that there was nothing in the story that Tomlinson might have been assaulted by police. During this period, according to Tomlinson's family, they were prevented from seeing his body; they were first allowed to see him six days after his death.

On 7 April The Guardian published the American banker's video, and later that evening handed it to an IPCC investigator and a City of London police officer who arrived at the newspaper's offices. The officers asked that the video be removed from the website, arguing that it jeopardized their inquiry and was not helpful to the family. Nick Hardwick, chair of the IPCC, said the IPCC had asked The Guardian to remove the video only because it would have been better had witnesses not seen it before being questioned.

=== Metropolitan police response ===
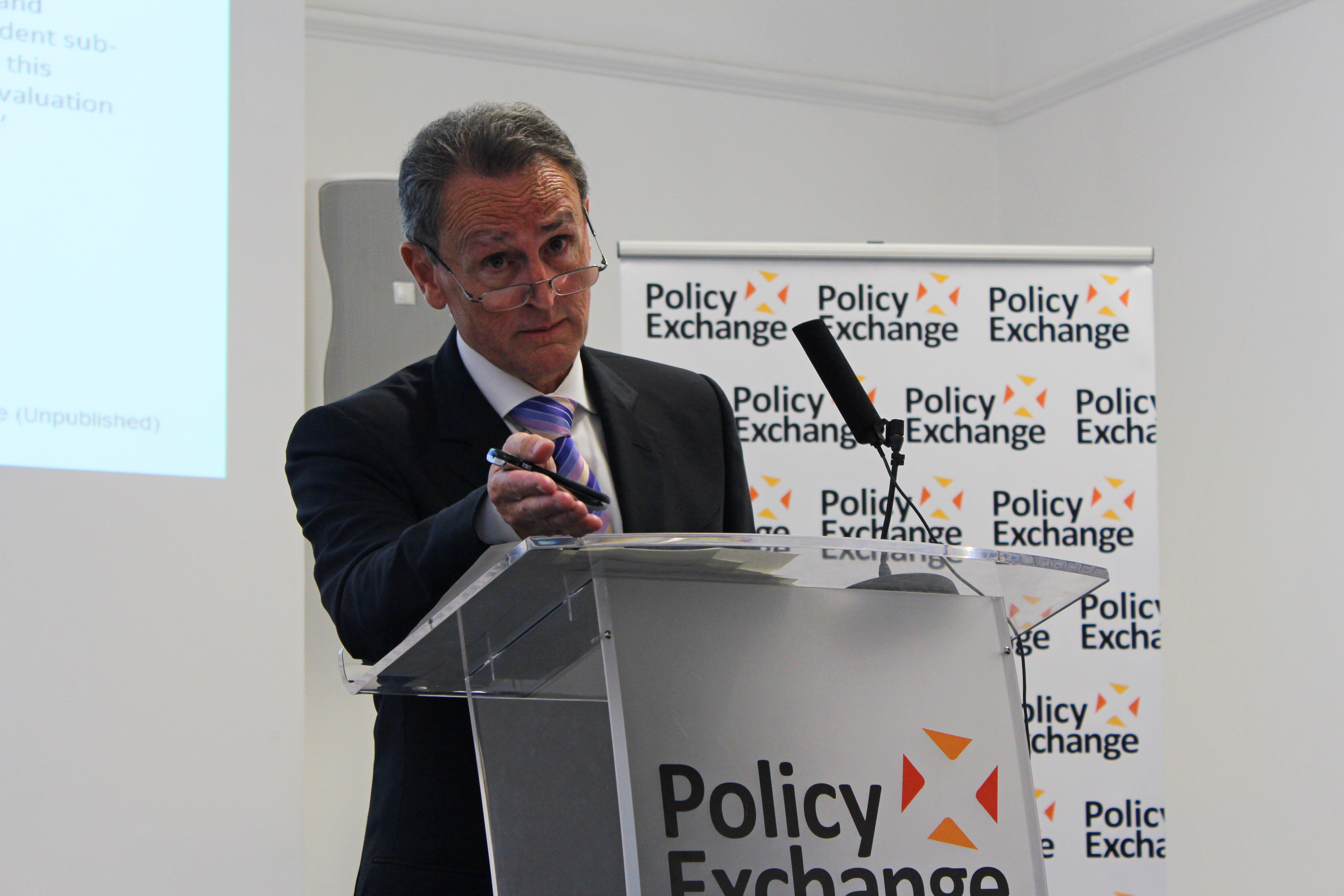
Denis O'Connor, 2012

The Chief Inspector of Constabulary, Denis O'Connor, published a 150-page report in November 2009 that aimed to restore Britain's consent-based model of policing.

O'Connor wrote that there had been a hardening of police attitudes, with officers believing that proportionality meant reciprocity. The deployment of officers in riot gear had become a routine response to lawful protest, largely the result of an ignorance of the law and a lack of leadership from the Home Office and police chiefs. Officers were being trained to use their riot shields as weapons. Police forces across the country differed in their training, the equipment they had access to, and their understanding of the law. The failure to understand the relevant legislation was in part due to its complexity, the report said, with 90 amendments to the Public Order Act passed since 1986.

The report made several recommendations, including the creation of a set of national principles emphasizing the minimum use of force at all times, and making the display of police ID a legal requirement. In February 2010 the Met announced that 8,000 of its officers had been issued with embroidered epaulettes, as several had complained that the numbers were falling off, rather than being removed deliberately.

== Legal aftermath ==
=== Decision not to prosecute ===
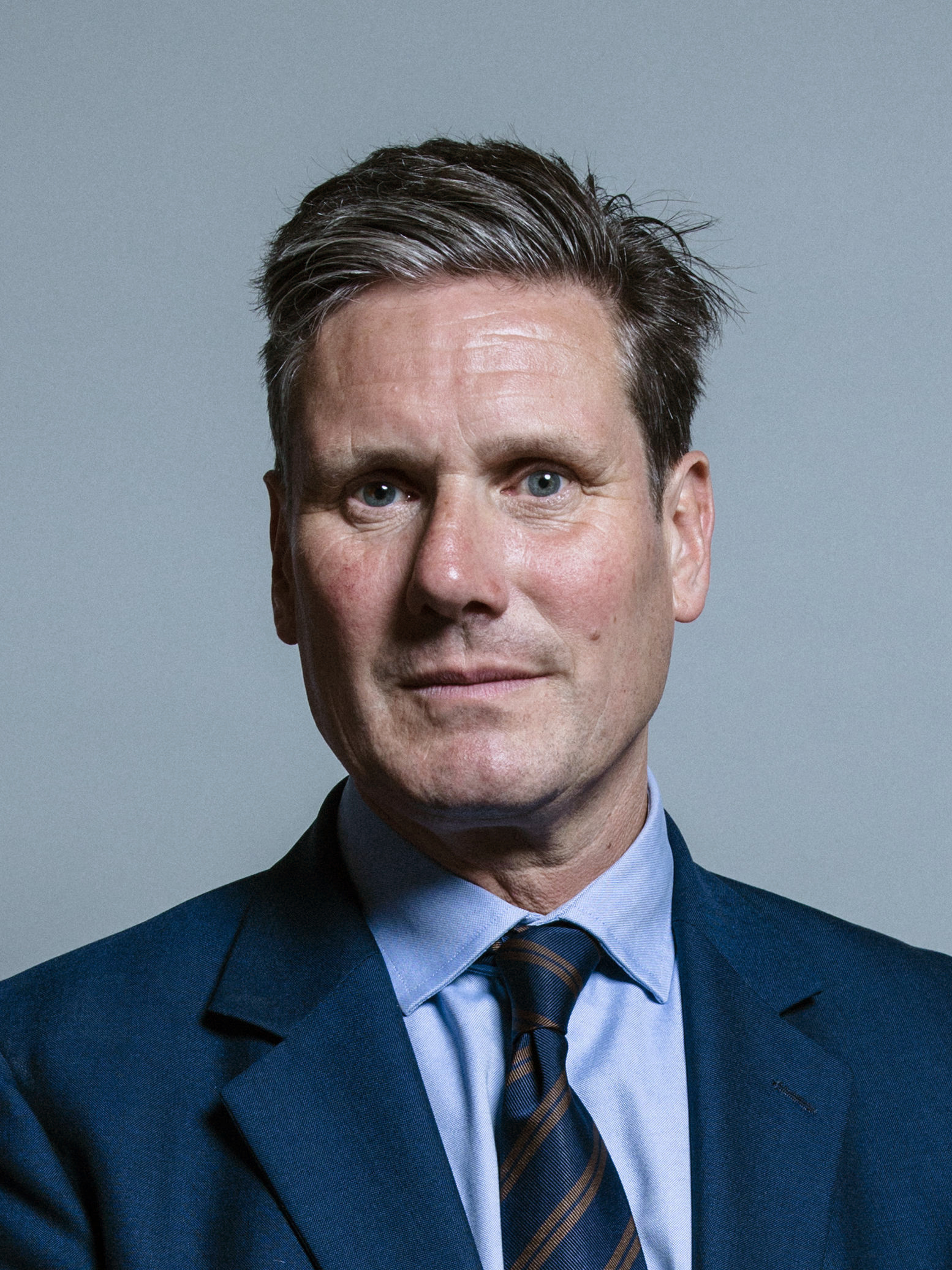
Keir Starmer, director of the CPS

In April 2010 The Guardian published an open letter from several public figures asking the Crown Prosecution Service (CPS) to proceed with a prosecution or explain its position. In July that year Keir Starmer, director of the CPS, announced that there would be no prosecution because of the medical disagreement between the three pathologists. Starmer said there was enough evidence for an assault charge, but the six-month deadline for that had expired.

The area of conflict concerned Patel's finding during the first post-mortem of "intraabdominal fluid blood about 3l with small blood clot". This was interpreted by other medical experts to mean that Patel had found three litres of blood in Tomlinson's abdomen. Starmer said this would have been around 60 percent of Tomlinson's blood volume, a "highly significant indicator of the cause of death".

In April 2010 Patel introduced an ambiguity in a second report for the CPS, saying he had found "intraabdominal fluid with blood about 3l with small blood clot" [emphasis added]. The ambiguity had to be clarified, because the second and third pathologists had relied in part on Patel's original notes to form their views. Patel was interviewed twice by the CPS. According to Starmer, Patel "maintained that the total fluid was somewhat in excess of three litres but that it was mainly ascites (a substance which forms in a damaged liver), which had been stained with blood. He had not retained the fluid nor had he sampled it in order to ascertain the proportion of blood because, he said, he had handled blood all his professional life and he knew that this was not blood but blood-stained ascites." Patel also said he had found no internal rupture that would have led to this degree of blood loss.

Several conclusions were drawn from discussions between Patel and the CPS, Starmer said: (a) because Patel had not retained or sampled the three litres of fluid, no firm conclusions could be drawn about the nature of it; (b) for Tomlinson's death to have resulted so quickly from blood loss, there would have to have been a significant internal rupture; (c) Patel found no such rupture; (d) the later postmortems also found no visible rupture; and (e) because Patel was the only person to have examined Tomlinson's intact body, he was in the best position to judge the nature of the fluid, and whether there was a rupture that could have caused it. This meant that Patel's evidence would significantly undermine the evidence of the second and third pathologists.

Nathaniel Cary, the second pathologist, objected to the CPS's decision. Cary told The Guardian that the push had caused a haemorrhage to Tomlinson's abdomen, and the haemorrhage caused him to collapse. Cary said Tomlinson was vulnerable to this because he had liver disease. The CPS had erred in dismissing a charge of actual bodily harm (ABH), in his view. In a letter to Tomlinson's family, the CPS described Tomlinson's injuries as "relatively minor" and therefore insufficient to support such a charge. But Cary told The Guardian: "The injuries were not relatively minor. He sustained quite a large area of bruising. Such injuries are consistent with a baton strike, which could amount to ABH. It's extraordinary. If that's not ABH I would like to know what is."

=== Inquest ===
The inquest was opened and adjourned in April 2009. The City of London coroner, Paul Matthews, expressed concern about whether he had appropriate expertise, and Peter Thornton QC, who specialises in protest law, was appointed in his place. The inquest opened on 28 March 2011 before a jury. The court heard from Kevin Channer, a cardiologist at Royal Hallamshire Hospital, who analysed electrocardiogram (ECG) data from the defibrillator paramedics had used on Tomlinson. He said the readings were inconsistent with an arrhythmic heart attack, but consistent with death from internal bleeding. Pathologist Nat Carey concurred regarding the cause of death. Graeme Alexander, a hepatologist, said that in his opinion Tomlinson had died of internal bleeding as a result of trauma to the liver after the fall. He told the court that Tomlinson had been suffering from serious liver disease, which would have made him susceptible to collapse from internal bleeding.

Giving evidence over three days, Harwood said that Tomlinson "just looked as if he was going to stay where he was forever and was almost inviting physical confrontation in terms of being moved on". He said he had not warned Tomlinson and had acted because Tomlinson was encroaching a police line, which amounted to a breach of the peace. The court heard that Tomlinson's last words after collapsing were, "they got me, the fuckers got me"; he died moments later. On 3 May 2011 the jury returned a verdict of unlawful killing, ruling that the officer—Harwood was not named for legal reasons—had used excessive and unreasonable force in hitting Tomlinson, and had acted "illegally, recklessly and dangerously".

=== IPCC reports ===
In May 2011 the IPCC released three reports into Tomlinson's death, written between April 2010 and May 2011. The main report contained material revealed during the inquest. The third report detailed an allegation from Tomlinson's family that the police had offered misleading information to the pathologists before the third post-mortem on 22 April 2009. The Met's point of contact for Tomlinson's death, Detective Inspector Eddie Hall, had told the pathologists that Tomlinson had fallen to the ground in front of a police van earlier in the evening, although there was no evidence to support this. The IPCC ruled that Hall had been reckless in making this claim, but had not intended to mislead the pathologists.

=== Trial of Simon Harwood ===
Regina -v- Simon Harwood
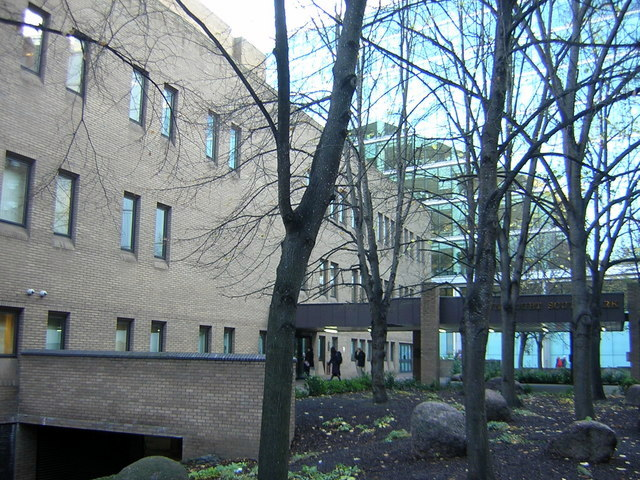
- Courthouse at 1 English Grounds, London SE1
- Court: Southwark Crown Court
- Started: 18 June 2012
- Decided: 19 July 2012
- Verdict: Not guilty
- Defendant: Simon Harwood
- Charge: Manslaughter
- Prosecution: Mark Dennis QC
- Defence: Patrick Gibbs QC

Court membership
- Judge sitting: The Honourable Mr Justice Fulford

Keir Starmer, director of the CPS, announced on 24 May 2011 that a summons for manslaughter had been issued against Harwood. He said the CPS had reviewed its decision not to prosecute because new medical evidence had emerged during the inquest, and because the various medical accounts, including that of the first pathologist, had been tested during questioning. The trial opened on 18 June 2012. Harwood entered a plea of not guilty, and was acquitted on 19 July.

The court was shown extensive video footage of Tomlinson and Harwood on the day. Harwood was seen trying to arrest a man who had daubed graffiti on a police van, then joining a line of officers who were clearing Royal Exchange Passage. Harwood pushed a man who blew a vuvuzela at him, then appeared to push a BBC cameraman who was filming the arrest of another man. The footage showed Harwood push a third man out of the way, and shortly after this (the passageway now almost empty) the officers reached Tomlinson.

Mark Dennis QC, for the prosecution, argued that Harwood's use of force against Tomlinson had been unnecessary and unreasonable, and had caused Tomlinson's death. He argued that a "clear temporal link" between the incident and Tomlinson's collapse had been provided by the Guardian video, that Tomlinson had posed no threat, and that the use of force had been a "gratuitous act of aggression". The defence argued that Tomlinson's health was relevant. The court heard that he had liver and brain disease caused by alcohol abuse, numbness in his legs and balance problems, and that he had been treated at least 20 times between 2007 and 2009, mostly at A&E departments, related to falling while drunk. On the day he died, The Times reported, he had drunk a bottle of red wine, a small bottle of vodka and several cans of 9-per-cent super-strength lager.

Harwood told the court that Tomlinson had ignored orders to move along. He acknowledged that he had pushed Tomlinson firmly, but said he had not expected him to fall. He also acknowledged that he had "got it wrong", and said he had not realized Tomlinson was in such poor health. The jury found him not guilty after deliberating for four days.

=== Dismissal, civil suit ===
Harwood was dismissed from the Metropolitan Police Service in September 2012 after a disciplinary hearing found that he had acted with "gross misconduct" in his actions towards Tomlinson. Tomlinson's family filed a lawsuit against the Metropolitan Police, which paid the family an undisclosed sum in August 2013. Deputy Assistant Commissioner Maxine de Brunner issued a formal apology for "Simon Harwood's use of excessive and unlawful force, which caused Mr Tomlinson's death, and for the suffering and distress caused to his family as a result."
