= Paul Lewis (journalist) =

British journalist (born 1981)

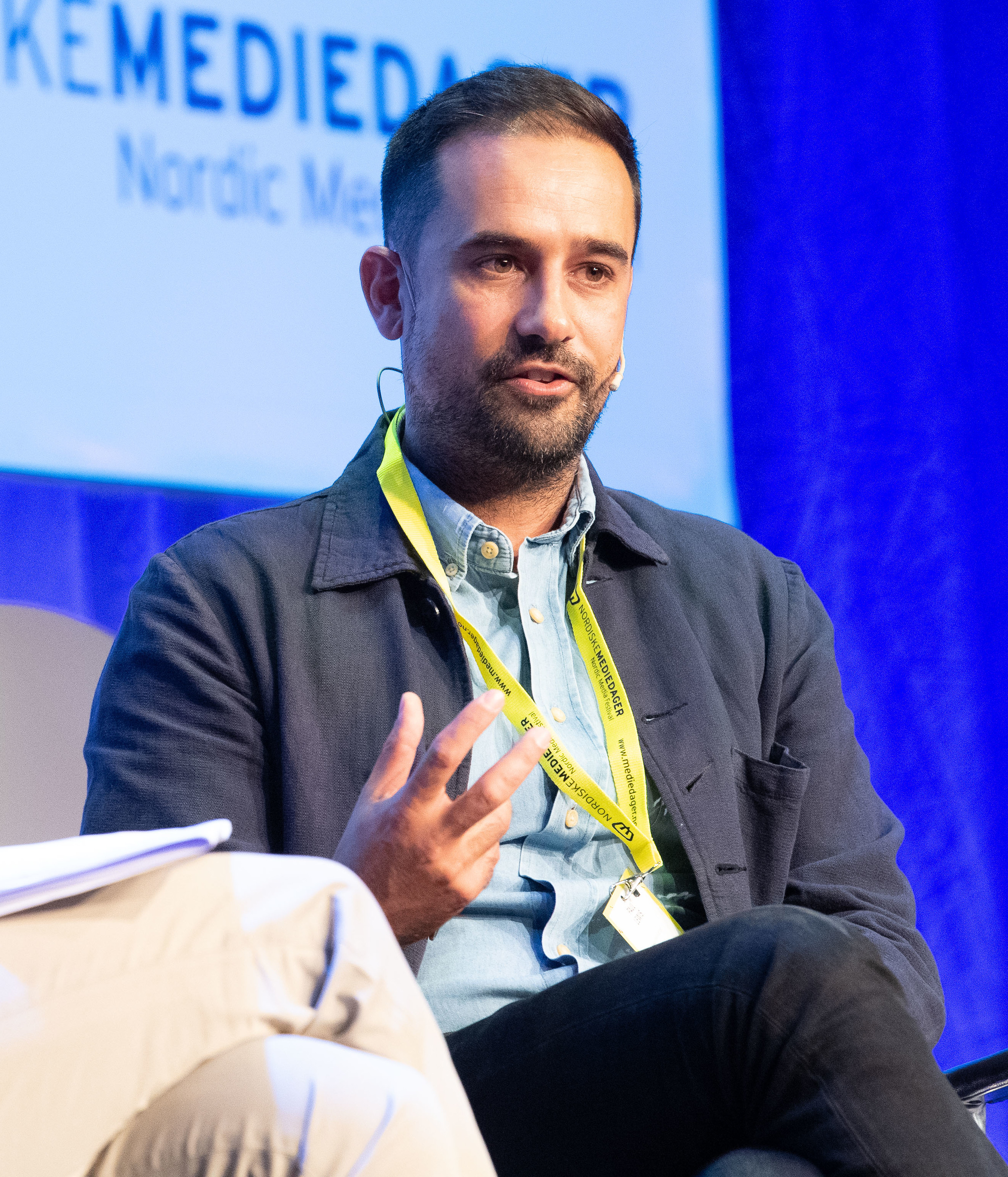
- Paul Lewis in May 2019
- Born: 1981 (age 43–44)
- Occupation: Journalist
- Employer: The Guardian
- Awards: Laurence Stern Fellow (2007); Bevins Prize (2009); BPA "Reporter of the Year" (2010); EPP "Innovation Award" (2013); BPA "Reporter of the Year" (2014)

Paul Lewis (born 1981) is head of investigations at The Guardian as of December 2024. He was previously the newspaper's Washington Correspondent, San Francisco Bureau Chief and Associate Editor and has won 12 awards, mostly for investigative reporting. He is the co-author of Undercover: The True Story of Britain's Secret Police.

== Education ==
Lewis studied at King's College, Cambridge; he was President of Cambridge Students' Union in 2002–2003.

== Career ==
=== Early career ===
Lewis joined The Guardian as a trainee in 2005, and was Stern Fellow at The Washington Post in 2007. Early in his career, he became known for his award-winning investigation of the death of Ian Tomlinson at the 2009 G20 summit protests in London. In August 2010 Lewis became head of The Guardian's "multimedia special projects team" which aims to find "new angles on breaking news stories, including using multimedia and crowdsourcing".

=== Investigation of the death of Ian Tomlinson ===
Lewis was named "Reporter of the Year" in 2010 at the British Press Awards for his work exposing details of the death of Ian Tomlinson at the 2009 G20 summit protests. This work was also recognised with the Bevins Prize (2009) for outstanding investigative journalism. The Bevins Trust said of his investigation:

Paul uncovered the truth by persistently questioning and challenging the police account, by following up on the family, and assiduously garnering eye-witness evidence, until finally he obtained incontrovertible video evidence from a bystander who filmed the incident. In achieving this Paul used every method now available to a modern journalist, online and in print, to keep pushing and nudging at the story until he established what had really happened. His work led to internal and independent police inquiry, extensive and international public comment, and has changed the way police behave in potential riot situations, and how they receive and investigate complaints into such incidents. All in all, his story was a triumph for the assertion of civil liberty, as well as a revelation about policing conduct.

=== Career since 2011 ===
At TEDxThessaloniki in April 2011 he gave a talk on how citizen journalism and social media had helped him report on the Ian Tomlinson case and the unlawful killing of Jimmy Mubenga. In 2013, he received the Innovation Award by the European Press Prize for his project Reading the Riots. In 2014, he was the joint winner of the Reporter of the Year award at the British Press Awards, with his colleague, Rob Evans.

His eight-part series Anywhere but Washington explored what America's most overlooked peoples and places revealed about a nation divided in 2016.

He appeared in the movie The Brink (2019), interviewing former White House chief strategist Steve Bannon. His film, How Steve Bannon's Far-Right Movement Stalled in Europe, won the 2019 DIG Award for investigative documentaries, which was praised by the jury for "its innovative point-of-view investigation, for its puncturing of inflated media myths, and for its original, research-driven exposure of a possible electoral crime in progress". In 2021, his team reported on the Pandora Papers, which Lewis said raised issues of "genuine public interest". In 2022, Lewis' team was a joint winner of the George Polk Award for their contribution to The Pegasus Project.
