= Anthony Bevins =

English journalist

Anthony John Bevins (16 August 1942 – 23 March 2001) was an English journalist, sometimes known as Tony Bevins.

He grew up in Toxteth, Liverpool, and was the son of a minister in Harold Macmillan's cabinet, Reggie Bevins. Anthony Bevins was educated at the Liverpool Collegiate School and the London School of Economics.

During a year in Bengal, teaching for the Voluntary Service Overseas (VSO), he met his wife, Mishtuni Roy, known as Mishtu; they married in a Bengal temple in 1965. Bevins started at the Liverpool Post in 1967, moved to London as its lobby correspondent in 1970, and then joined the political staff of the Sunday Express in 1973. Later that year he became The Sun's political correspondent. He moved to the Daily Mail in 1976. In 1981 he became chief political correspondent of The Times, but the Wapping dispute, over Rupert Murdoch's move of the paper's staff to Wapping, ended this period of his career. Bevins stood in the final union chapel meeting and told his colleagues, "I will go to Wapping with ashes in my mouth".

Bevins joined The Independent before its launch in 1986, and was the newspaper's first political editor. Significantly, his newspaper opposed the anonymous lobby system, preferring to find their own sources, a policy Bevins fully supported. This innovation was short-lived, but did lead to such briefings being attributed. He was credited by Colin Hughes with bringing down Margaret Thatcher. In 1991, he won the What the Papers Say 'Political Reporter of the Year' award.

He left The Independent in 1993 for The Observer, but returned to The Independent in 1996, and moved again in 1998 to the Daily Express, but left the Express in 2000 after it was taken over "by a pornographer", Richard Desmond.

He died of pneumonia aged 58, shortly after his wife. He was considered one of the most free-spirited political journalists of his time. It was because of his 'free spirit' that the Bevins Prize for investigative journalism was named in his honour.
