= Clare Sambrook =

English-Irish journalist and author

- Education: University of Cambridge
- Occupation: Journalist
- Notable work: Hide and Seek (2005)
- Awards: Bevins Prize (2010); Paul Foot Award (2010)

Clare Sambrook is an English-Irish freelance journalist and author. Sambrook is best known for her work concerning the "End Child Detention Now" campaign, which won her the Paul Foot Award and the Bevins Prize.

== Education and career ==
In high school, Sambrook won the Vellacott History Prize from the University of Cambridge. She later studied at Cambridge.

After university, Sambrook began working for the John Lewis Gazette, then worked for the Haymarket Group. She later was employed by The Daily Telegraph newspaper, before leaving to become a freelance journalist so that she could concentrate on investigations.

Canongate published Sambrook's first novel, Hide and Seek, in the UK in 2005. The book is written from the point of view of a nine-year-old boy called Harry who had to deal with the aftermath of the abduction of his five-year-old brother, Daniel.

In 2010, Sambrook won the Paul Foot Award and the Bevins Prize for her articles that exposed government policies concerning the arrest and detention of asylum-seeking families and for her work with the "End Child Detention Now" campaign, which she co-founded.

She was nominated for the Orwell Prize in 2013 and 2015.
