= Deborah Haynes =

British journalist (born 1976)

- Deborah Haynes
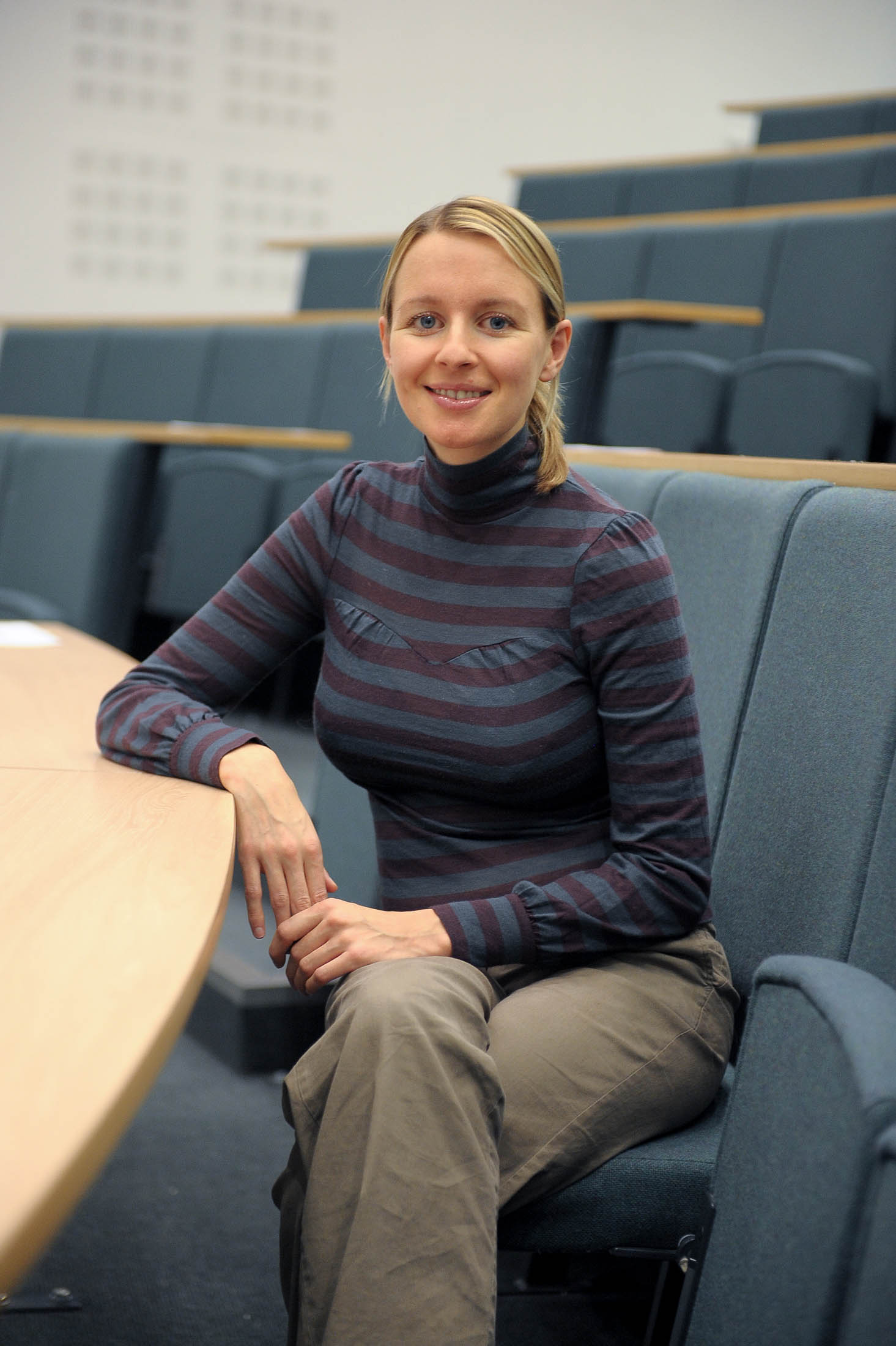
- Haynes in 2009
- Born: October 1976 (age 49)
- Education: Cardiff University
- Occupations: Journalist, editor, correspondent
- Employer: Sky News (2018–)
- Awards: Amnesty International UK Media Awards (2008); Bevins Prize (2008); honorary degree (2011)

Deborah Haynes (born October 1976) is a British journalist, security and defence editor at Sky News. She was previously known for her work as defence editor for The Times as well as documenting the dangers Iraqi interpreters faced since British troops withdrew from Iraq.

== Biography ==
Haynes grew up in Surrey, attending Collingwood College, Surrey. She had her first experience of journalism during a work experience week where she was placed with Aldershot News.

Haynes then graduated from the University of Cardiff in 1999 with a degree in law and Japanese.

In 1999, she began working as a producer for the British bureau of the Japanese television channel TV Tokyo. Then she worked for Agence France-Presse and Reuters. At the end of May 2018, it was announced that Haynes was to leave The Times to join Sky News as their Foreign Affairs editor. She replaced Sam Kiley who left Sky News that January to join CNN.

In June and December 2025, Haynes presented The Wargame, a podcast produced jointly by Sky News and Tortoise Media which presented a simulated British response to a Russian military threat. The game was conceived by Rob Johnson of the University of Oxford's Changing Character of War Centre and featured former Ministry of Defence officials and Conservative and Labour ministers as the key players in the British response. Notable participants included Ben Wallace as the Prime Minister, Amber Rudd as the Home Secretary and Jack Straw as the Foreign Secretary. In June 2026, it was announced that the podcast will be turned into a four-part television series.

Haynes speaks Japanese and French.

== Personal life ==
In August 2025, Haynes was left fighting for her life after falling ill with aHUS, an extremely rare kidney condition. Haynes was first diagnosed with the condition in January 2017, after it caused her to be hospitalised.

As of September 2025, Haynes was married.

== Awards ==
In 2008, Haynes won the inaugural Bevins Prize and an Amnesty International UK Media Award for her work documenting the dangers that Iraqi interpreters faced after the withdrawal of British troops from the country. She also campaigned for Iraqi interpreters to be allowed to live in the UK.

She was awarded with an honorary degree from the University of Salford in Greater Manchester in 2011.

Media offices
Preceded by Sam Kiley	Foreign Affairs Editor of Sky News; 2018–present	Incumbent
