= Bob Broadhurst =

British police chief

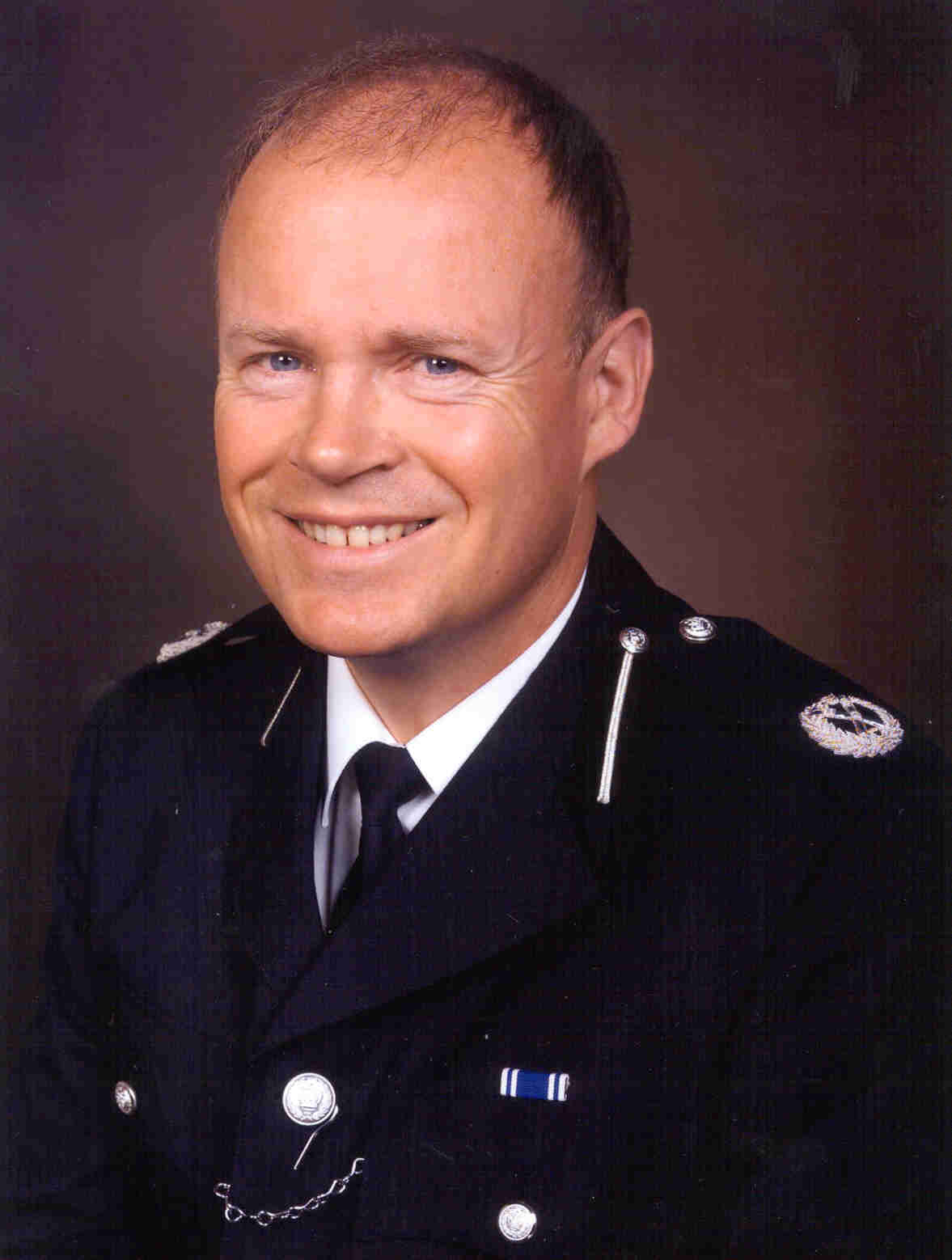
Cmdr Bob Broadhurst

Robert James Broadhurst OBE QPM is a British commander and police officer. He was the 2012 Olympics Gold Commander for the Metropolitan Police Service. He was formerly Commander for Public Order and Pan London Operational Support of London's Metropolitan Police Service.

== Police career ==
Broadhurst served with the Metropolitan Police Service for 30+ years, primarily in South-East London. He was, for four years, Sutton Borough Commander and Lambeth deputy Borough Commander for a year. For four years he was the Link Commander for South East London, with responsibility overall for all eight Boroughs in that area. In July 2006 he was appointed Commander Public Order and Pan London Operational Support.

He has experience as a hostage negotiator, during the Stansted Airport Afghan Airlines hi-jack he was the Negotiator Team Leader. At the longest siege in the UK, the Hackney Siege, which ended with the death of Eli Hall, he was the Gold Commander -operational chief officer,. He speaks at National Siege Management courses, and has contributed to the FBI Crisis Negotiator Course at the United States FBI Academy.

Between 1990 and his retirement, he commanded public order events, including many large-scale demonstrations. He commanded ceremonial events such as the State Opening of Parliament, and Trooping the Colour. At the wedding of the Prince of Wales and the Duchess of Cornwall he was the Gold Commander. In 2007 he was in charge of policing for the London leg of the Tour de France and for the 2008 Summer Olympics torch relay. He also led operational planning for the 2012 Olympics. He was involved in policing the 2009 Gaza Protests in London.

== Honours ==
In the 2005 Queens Birthday Honours list, Broadhurst was awarded the Queen's Police Medal.

He was appointed Officer of the Order of the British Empire (OBE) in the 2013 Birthday Honours for services to the public order policing of the Olympics.

== G20 protests ==
He was in overall charge (Gold) of Operation Glencoe, during the 2009 G-20 London summit protests. On 9 April he said "The eyes of the world were focused on London. While it was extremely hard work, I am happy with the way the day progressed, as the overall mood of the event was good." With his team he faces questioning by the Metropolitan Police Authority about the death of Ian Tomlinson, and also face questions about whether the stark warnings of violence he gave before the summit fuelled confrontation.

He was accused of misleading MP's in a Select Committee report on the G20. He incorrectly informed them that no undercover police officers were operating after an MP raised concerns about the use of agent provocateurs. Later it was revealed that 25 undercover officers were deployed and were mixing with demonstrators. Once this was revealed, Broadhurst claimed that the deployment of undercover officers was unknown to him, and that the plainclothes officers (some of whom were filmed with extended batons) were "evidence gatherers".

== See also ==
- Covert policing in the United Kingdom
