= 2009 G20 London summit protests =

Protests in London, England

- Protesters at Bank Junction on 1 April
- Date: 1–2 April 2009
- Location: City of London, England
- Deaths: 1 (Ian Tomlinson)
- Injuries: 180+
- Arrests: 100+

The 2009 G20 London summit protests occurred in the days around the 2 April 2009 G20 London summit. The summit was the focus of protests from a number of groups over various long-standing and topical issues. These ranged from disquiet over economic policy, anger at the banking system and bankers' remuneration and bonuses, the continued War on terror and concerns over climate change.

Although the majority of the protests were peaceful, the threat of violence and criminal damage were used by police as a reason to detain, or "kettle", protesters as part of Operation Glencoe. More than 100 protesters were arrested and more than 180 reported injuries as a result of police actions. A bystander, Ian Tomlinson, died shortly after being pushed to the ground by a police officer. A second post-mortem revealed that Tomlinson may have died from an abdominal haemorrhage. The inquest into Tomlinson's death found that he was unlawfully killed.

== Timeline of the protests ==
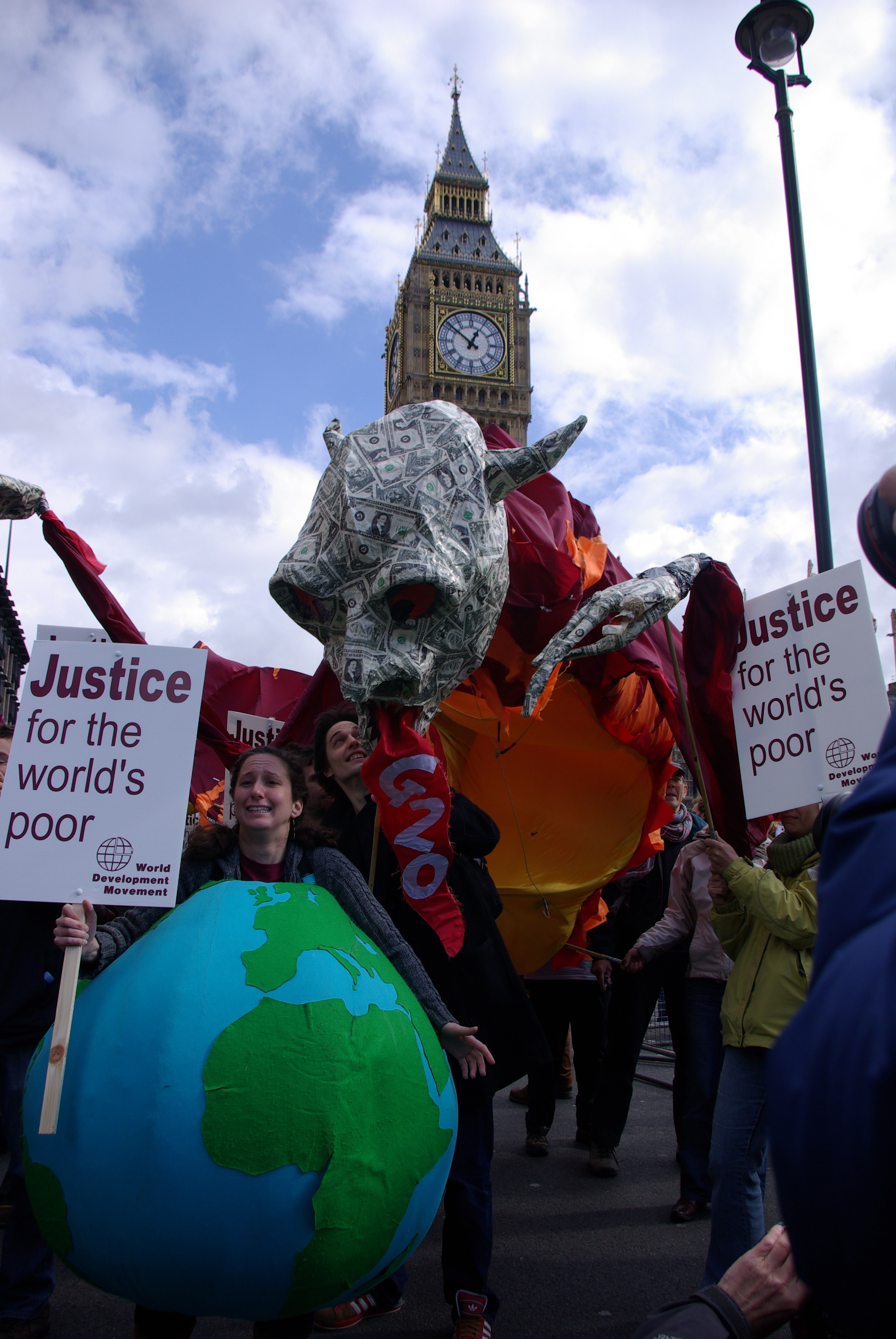
Put People First march; 28 March

28 March 2009
35,000 people joined the peaceful "March for Jobs, Justice and Climate" in central London, which was organised by Put People First, a civil-society coalition of more than 160 development non-governmental organisations, trade unions and environmental groups, organised in response to the London summit .

Their 12-point economic plan for democratic governance demanded democratised financial institutions to deliver secure jobs and public services, an end to global poverty and inequality, and a green economy. The movement was initiated by the Jubilee Debt Campaign, Trade Justice Movement, British Overseas NGOs for Development and TUC.

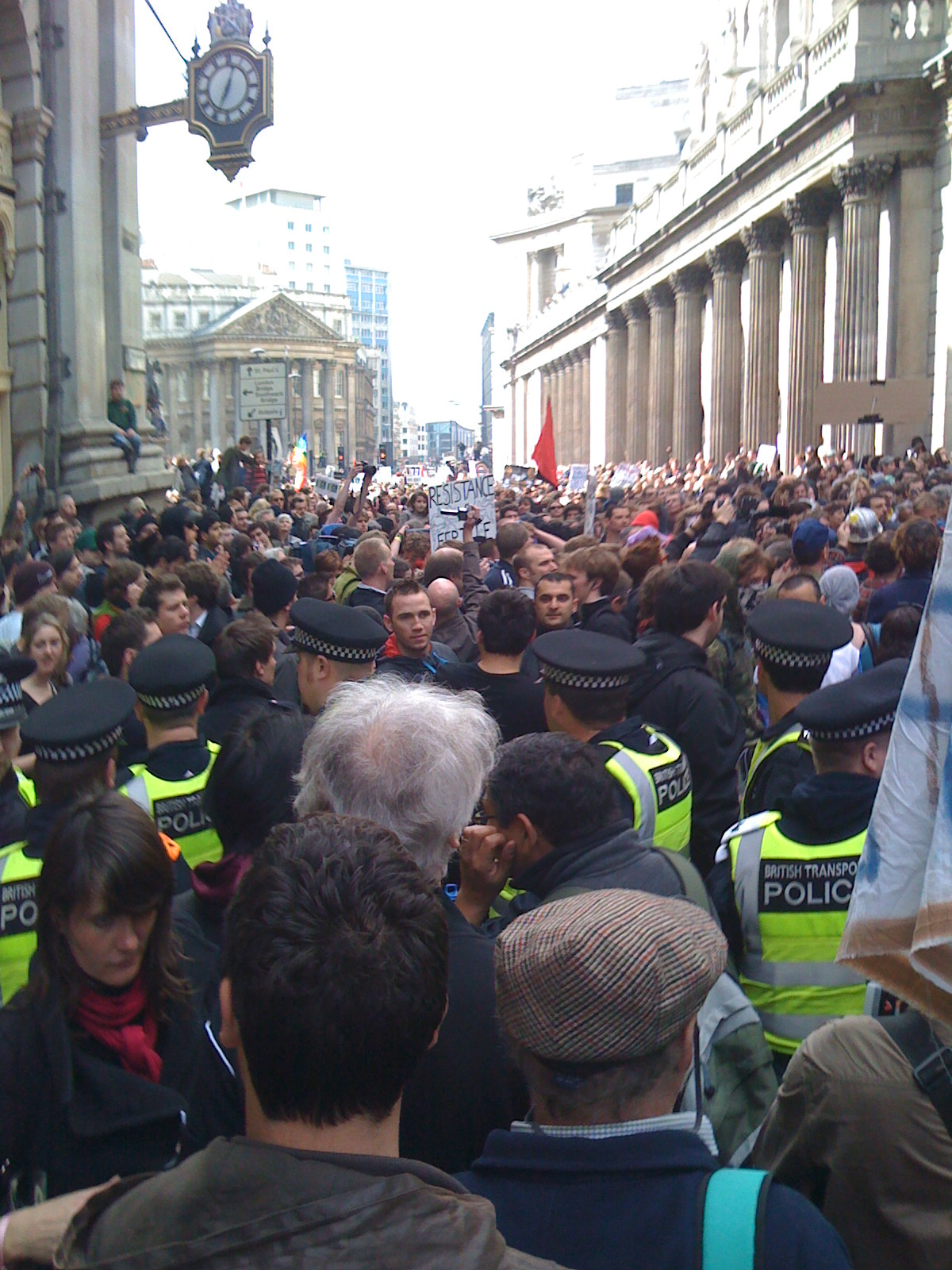
G20 Meltdown – 1 April 12:30 pm

A peace activist climbed over the railings into the Houses of Parliament as a symbolic gesture of "power to the people". When arrested by police he explained that "This is the people's parliament, and I am one of the people".

28 March 2009
Marches in several French cities were organised by Association for the Taxation of Financial Transactions for the Aid of Citizens.

1 April 2009 12 noon

Around five thousand people joined the "G20 Meltdown" protest outside the Bank of England. G20 Meltdown was an anti-capitalist, socialist organisation conceived in Paris and formed in London in January 2009 prior to the G20 summit. As well as the protest, they organised four nearby squats. Much of the protest, which was "kettled", was peaceful although there were violent confrontations. The police used batons and dogs and at least one policeman was injured; some protesters broke into a branch of Royal Bank of Scotland and a bystander, Ian Tomlinson, died after being hit with a baton from behind by a police officer near the protest.

1 April 2009 12:30 pm

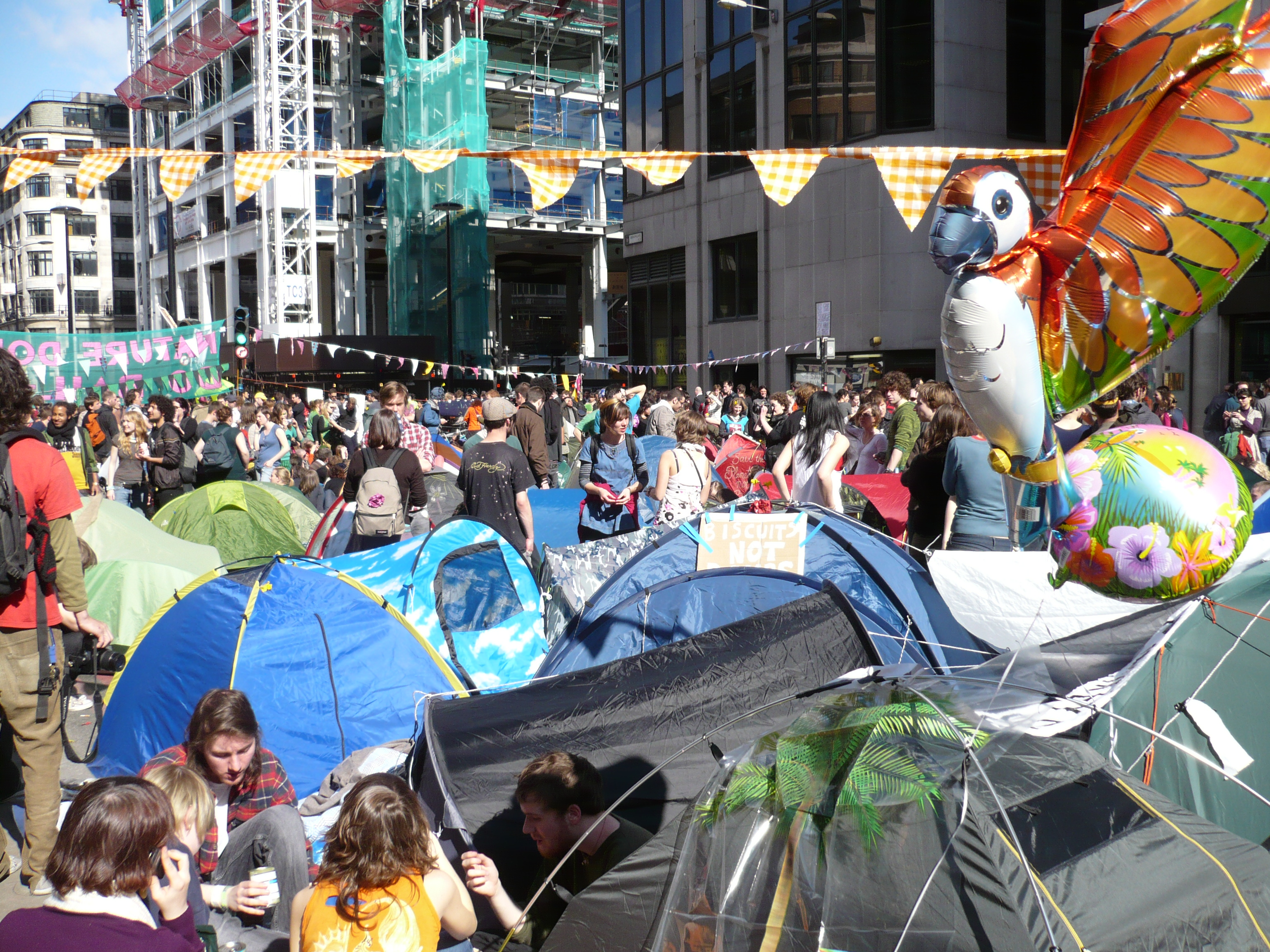
Climate Camp in the City – 1 April 4 pm

About two to three thousand people joined the "Climate Camp in the City" outside European Climate Exchange on Bishopsgate, which was peaceful except for when minor scuffles occurred after riot police "kettled" the event at 7:30 pm. The street was violently cleared by Territorial Support Group police after the media had left at about 2 am the following day.

1 April 2009 2 pm

Several hundred people joined a peaceful Stop the War Coalition march from the American embassy in Grosvenor Square to Trafalgar Square which brought together protesters from the Stop the War Coalition, Palestine Solidarity Campaign, The British Muslim Initiative, and the Campaign for Nuclear Disarmament.

1 April 2009 4 pm

An "alternative G20 Summit" with speakers including Tony Benn, Ken Loach, Ken Livingstone, John McDonnell and Caroline Lucas was scheduled to take place at the University of East London which was close to the main G20 Summit venue. At the last minute the university announced that the whole university would close for the duration of the summit on safety grounds, also that Prof Chris Knight, an anthropologist at the University for 20 years, had been suspended and the alternative summit was cancelled. In the event, the summit did go ahead and was held on the lawns of the university and started an hour later than planned and an attendance of 200–300 people.

2 April 2009

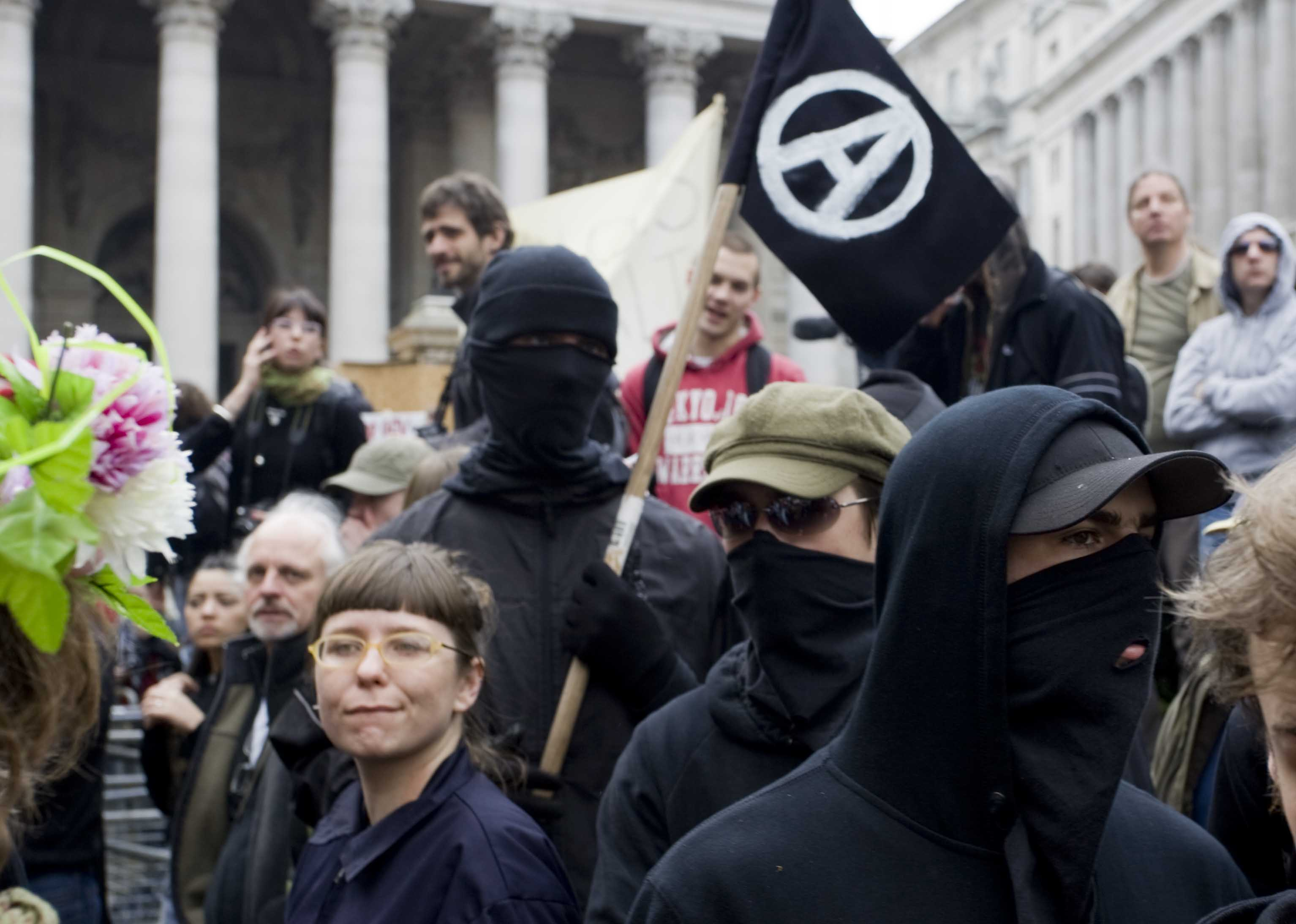
Anarchists at G20 protests

Around 200 people gathered for a vigil outside Bank following news of Ian Tomlinson's death, and were subjected to a police "kettle" despite the vigil being peaceful. 200 anti-war protesters from the Stop the War Coalition protested at the ExCeL Centre.

2 April 2009

"Spiderman", the French climber Alain Robert, climbed the Lloyd's building and unfurled a banner saying "100 months to save the world" in reference to the urgency of tackling climate change.

== Put People First ==
On 28 March 2009, 35,000 people marched through London. At a rally in Hyde Park, they were addressed by Global Call to Action Against Poverty co-chair Kumi Naidoo, TUC General Secretary Brendan Barber, environmentalist Tony Juniper, activist comedian Mark Thomas, and global justice author Susan George amongst others. They heard calls for international action to deliver tax justice, trade justice and a Green New Deal in both rich and poor countries.

The Put People First alliance of more than 160 unions, development, faith and environment groups called on the G20 leaders to recognise that "only just, fair and sustainable policies can lead the world out of recession, and that a return to 'business as usual' – with the associated poverty, inequality and climate change – is not an option".

Christian NGOs including World Vision and Tearfund organised an ecumenical service on the day at Methodist Central Hall, overseen by the Bishop of London. Delegations joined the march from around the world, including Belgium, Czech Republic, France, Germany, Hungary, Italy, Luxemburg, Netherlands, Portugal, Romania, Slovenia, Spain, Korea, USA, Australia, South Africa, Zambia, Canada and the Philippines.

== G20 Meltdown ==
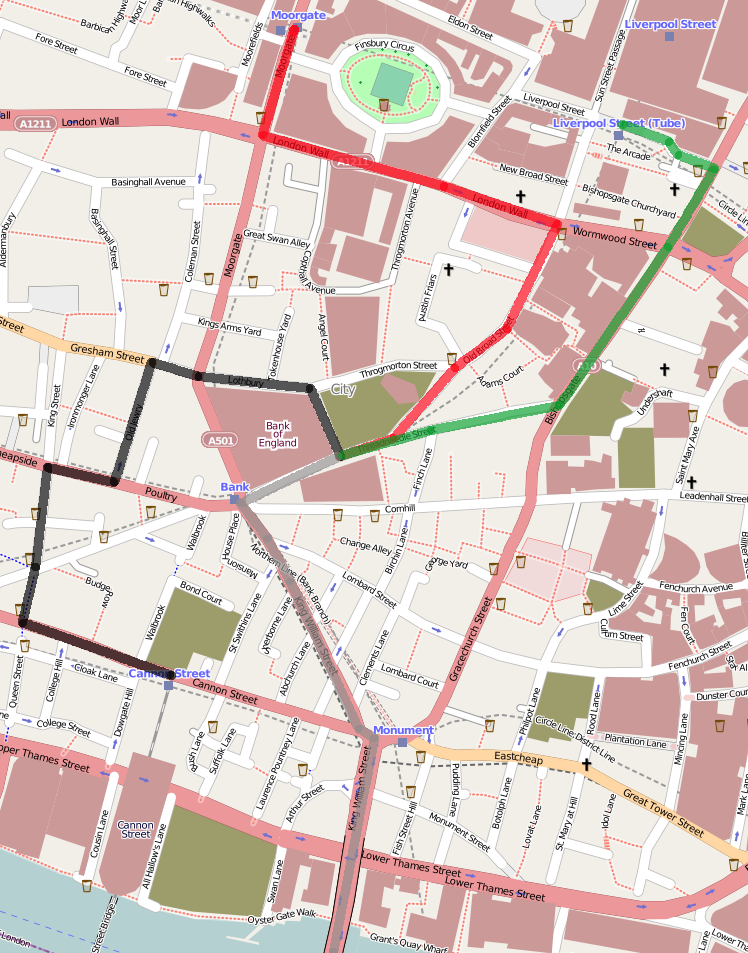
Routes of the marches

This protest took place outside the Bank of England. The aim was to "create a carnival outside the bank" and to "overthrow capitalism". Protesters referred to the day as "Financial Fools' Day", a reference to the protest taking place on April Fools' Day.

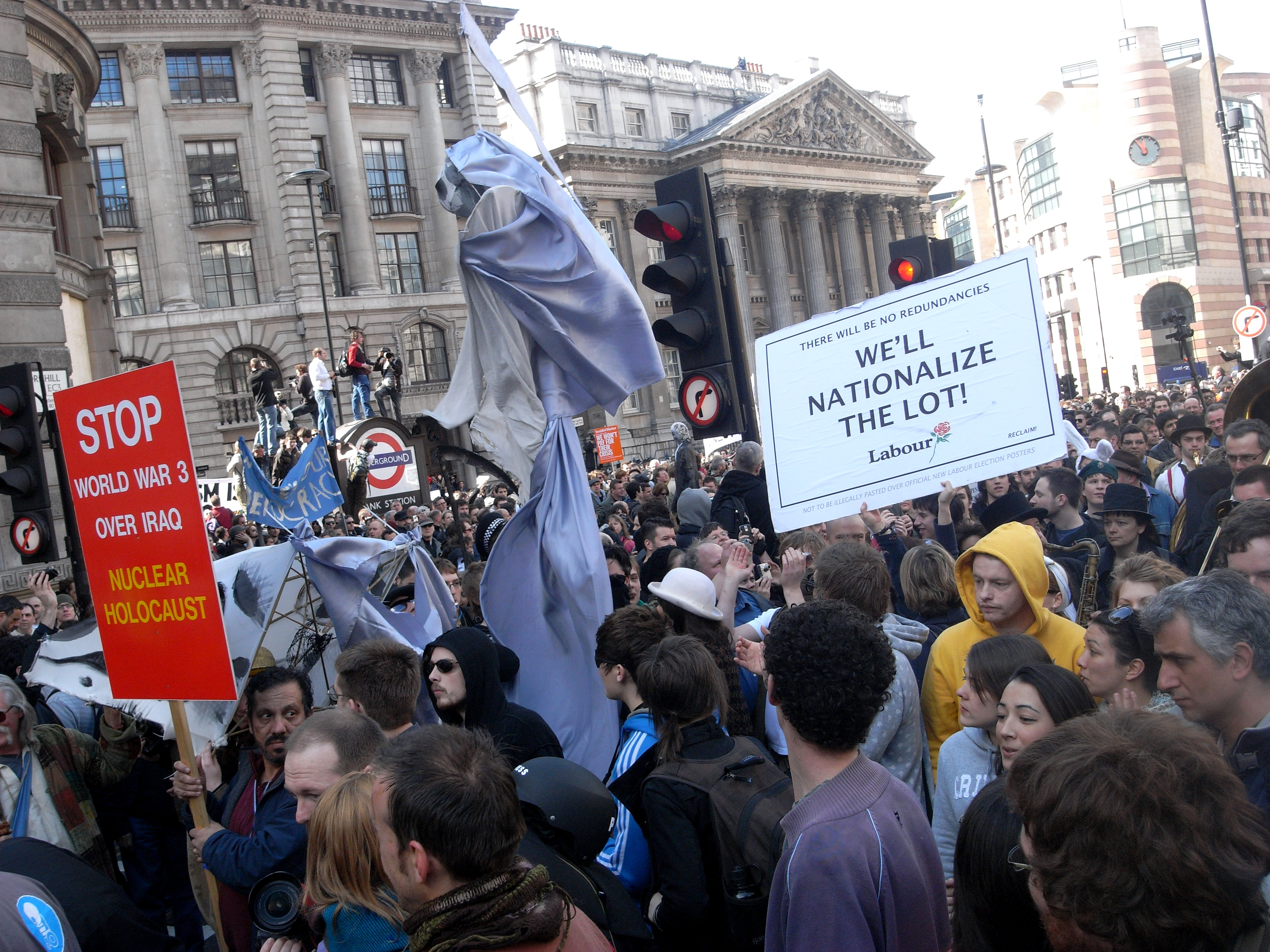
Protesters with one of the 'Four Horsemen of the Apocalypse'

The protest started at 11:25 as four planned marches, each led by one of the "Four Horsemen of the Apocalypse", converged on the Bank: the red horse against war approached from Moorgate; the green horse against climate chaos from Liverpool Street station; the silver horse against financial crimes from London Bridge and the black horse against land enclosures and borders from Cannon Street. Protesters were at the Bank of England by 11:53. Protest chants included "build a bonfire, put the bankers on the top", and some protesters shouted "jump" and "shame on you" at bankers watching from windows. The police cordoned off thousands of protesters at 12:52 and many of those within the cordon were not allowed to leave for up to seven hours. Tom Brake, a Member of Parliament and legal observer who was among those "kettled", has criticised this tactic.

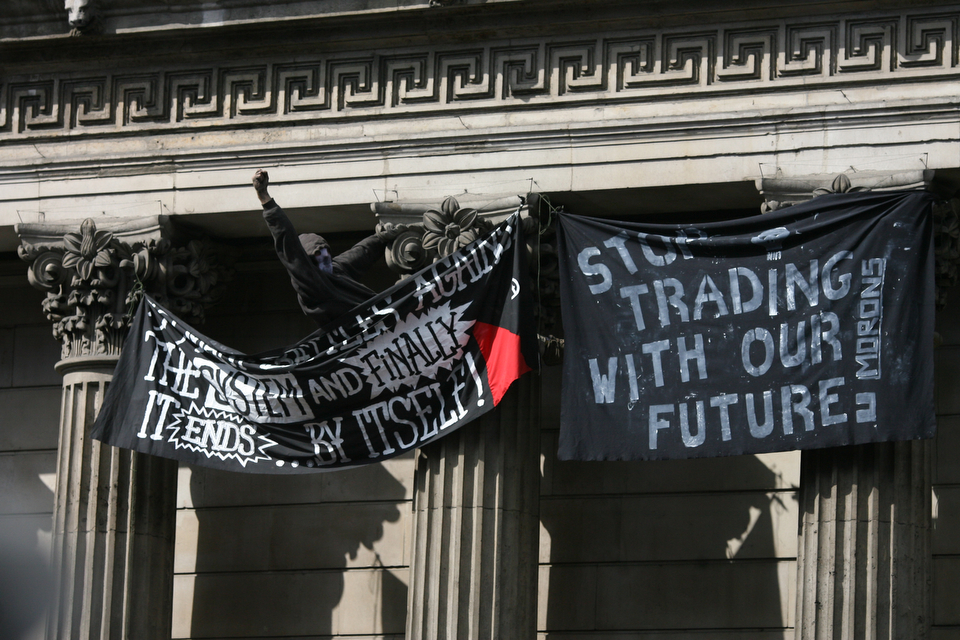
A protester hanging banners from the Bank of England

The windows of a branch of the Royal Bank of Scotland were broken by a group of protesters at 13:45, some of whom entered the building and looted office equipment and papers and threw smoke grenades, chairs and eggs There was intense media attention to this event, with a ring of photographers surrounding the people breaking the windows and David Howarth MP later commented that one of the unresolved mysteries of the day was why the moment that a masked person threw the first piece of scaffolding through the window it was observed by hundreds of photographers and film crews already in position. Four people, including a 17-year-old girl, have been charged in connection to this damage. RBS has asked for £40,000 in damages from the teenage girl, who has admitted burglary and criminal damage.

Following the damage to the bank, there were violent confrontations with the police with police using batons against the protesters while trying to push them back. Some protesters fought back, including one masked protester who hit police with a pole, resulting in one injury and a smoke or flour bomb was also thrown. A branch of HSBC also had windows smashed. A journalist reported that the police "were spat on, hit and had vile abuse screamed into their faces from inches away."

A professional photographer saw what they described as "agents provocateurs" instigating violence. One who was throwing bottles was challenged by protesters, who accused him of being a police officer. He ran to police lines and was allowed through after showing I.D. Tom Brake MP has also said that members of the crowd told him about suspected agents provocateurs who had been encouraging the crowd to throw objects at the police. A police spokesman said that "We would never deploy officers in this way or condone such behaviour."

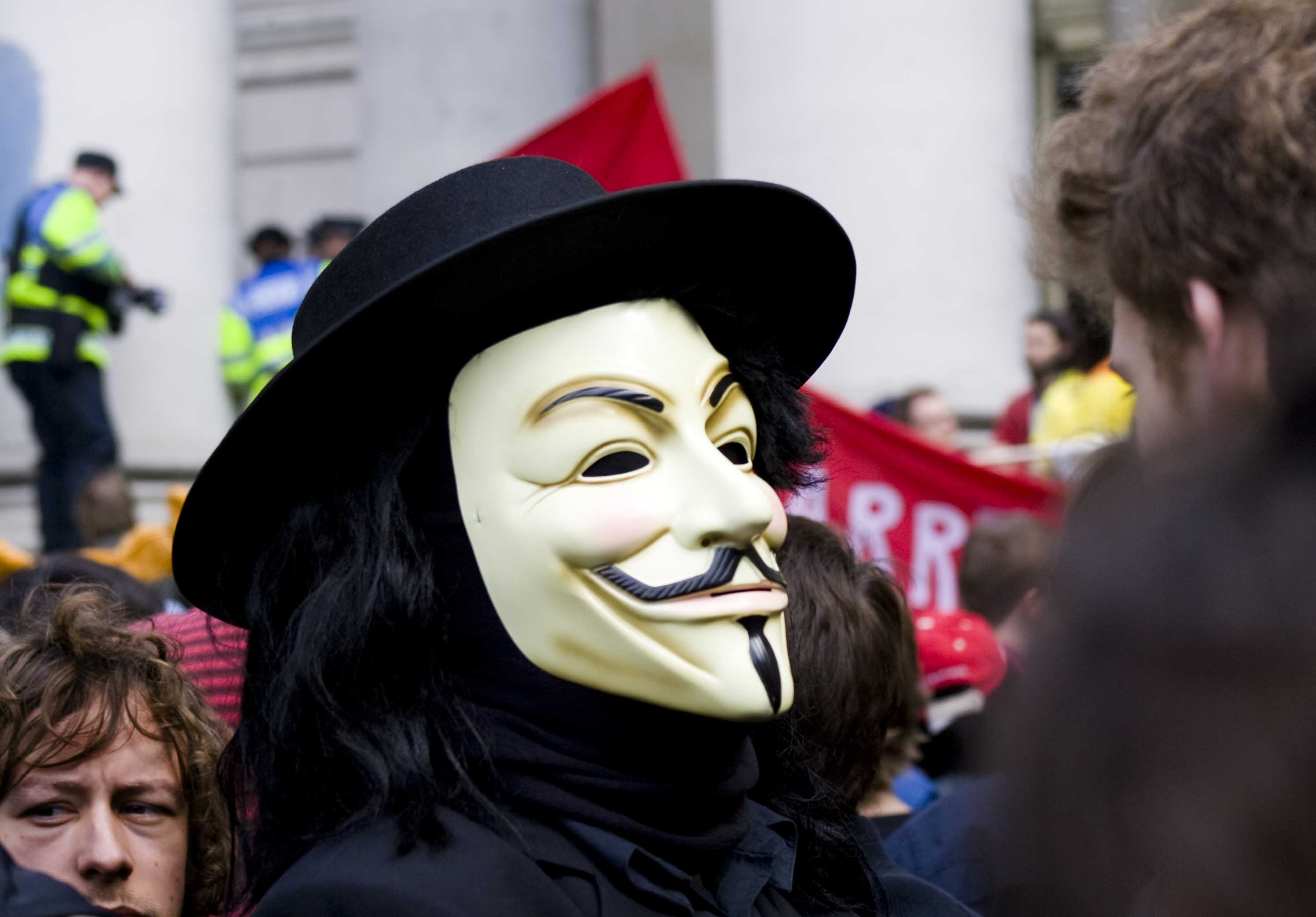
A protester dressed as V from V for Vendetta

Without alternative facilities, people used the entrances to Bank Underground station as a urinal, although the police said that temporary toilets and water were made available to protesters. As people were eventually allowed to leave at about 20:00, they were asked for their names and addresses, and required to have a photograph taken. They are, under the law, obliged to provide their name and address, however they did not need to provide the photograph, but those who refused were put back in the pen.

Commander Bob Broadhurst, the officer in charge of policing the G20 protests, said that the "overall mood" of the 1 April demonstrations was good although "unfortunately small groups of protesters intent on violence mixed with the crowds of lawful demonstrators." Phillip Georgopoulos, a student from Dudley who threw a computer monitor through the window of an RBS branch, was later jailed for two-and-a-half years A bystander, Ian Tomlinson, died after being pushed to the ground by a police officer.

=== Squats ===
Protesters set up four squats as bases close to the Bank of England on 31 March. The police raided an occupied derelict pub in Shoreditch on the evening of the 31st which had been publicised as a "convergence space for protesters"; they stopped and searched people entering the building and arrested three people, one on suspicion of assaulting a police officer.

On 1 April, Payne House on Earl Street near Liverpool Street Station was promoted as venue for workshops, films and accommodation with space to house "many, many people". The venue was advertised as a drug-free and alcohol-free centre with no photography allowed without permission. Police later raided a large Victorian office building in Earl Street and another squatted building, the RampART Social Center, in Whitechapel on 2 April, detaining a total of at least 80 people and arresting four. A video of the raid allegedly shows an officer pointing a Taser at protesters who are lying on the floor, which would be against police guidelines.

== Climate Camp ==
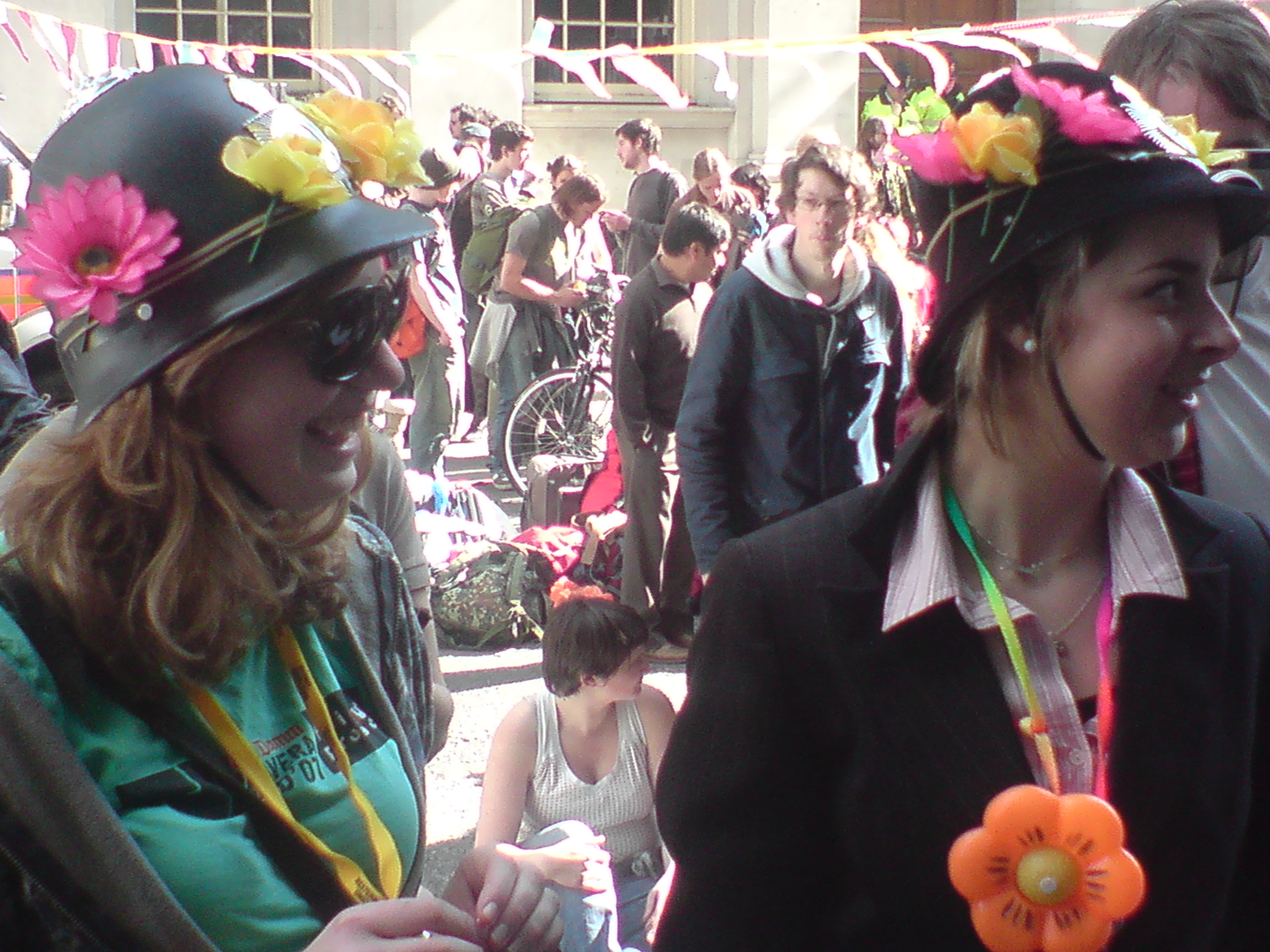
Protesters at the climate camp

The "Camp in the City" (51.5152°N 0.0825°W) on 1 April 2009 aimed to draw attention to carbon trading, claiming that far from being a way of reducing release of climate change gasses in the atmosphere it is used as an excuse to continue doing just that. The camp took place outside the European Climate Exchange in Bishopsgate

Prior to the actual camp a group of participants had played a game called "capture the flag" in the area on 27 March which was used by the protesters to familiarise themselves with the locale.

Climate Camp organisers agreed to meet with police and exchange contact details shortly before the protest. The meeting was arranged by Liberal Democrat MP David Howarth, who was to mediate at the meeting which was to take place at the House of Commons. Scotland Yard confirmed that a meeting was to take place with police Commander Bob Broadhurst and Chief Superintendent Ian Thomas.

The camp, which was intended to last for 24 hours, started at 12:30 pm when a camp was established in a section of Bishopsgate between Threadneedle Street and London Wall with tents set up and bunting across the road reading "Nature doesn't do bailouts". There were solar-powered sound systems, musicians and a food stall and some 1,000-plus relaxed people.

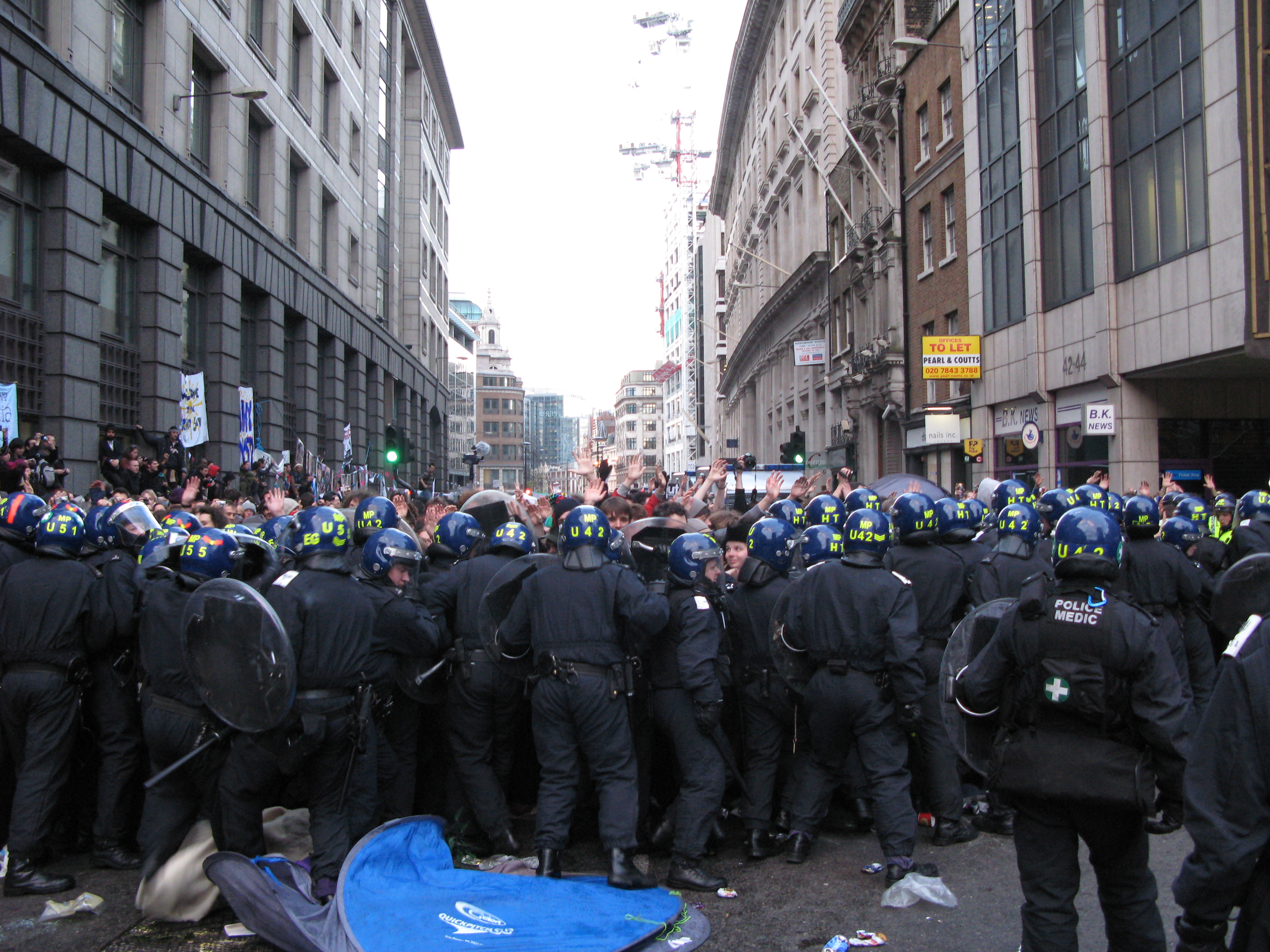
Riot police 'kettle' protesters

The atmosphere was still relaxed at about 5 pm when police with helmets, shields and batons began to surround areas of the camp using section 14 of the Public Order Act 1986.

At about 7 pm the police stopped allowing people to enter or leave the protest. The police advanced on protesters who put their hands in the air and passively resisted while chanting "This is not a riot", a tactic that emerged over the course of a number of Camp for Climate Action gatherings. There were scuffles with the police in which several protesters were hit and kicked by the police and one policewoman needed medical attention. Within the cordon people carried on playing music and preparing food and until the police began letting people leave at about 11:30 pm and cleared the area of the last protesters at about 2 am.

Organizers of the Climate Camp have released a report of the protests and the police response, "Demonstrating Respect for Rights", which includes allegations of police using violence to clear the camp after journalists had left. The camp legal team also released a video of the protests, which includes footage of a demonstrator being struck on the head by a police riot shield, and of another man being punched in the face as the crowd retreats from police.

== Alternative London Summit ==
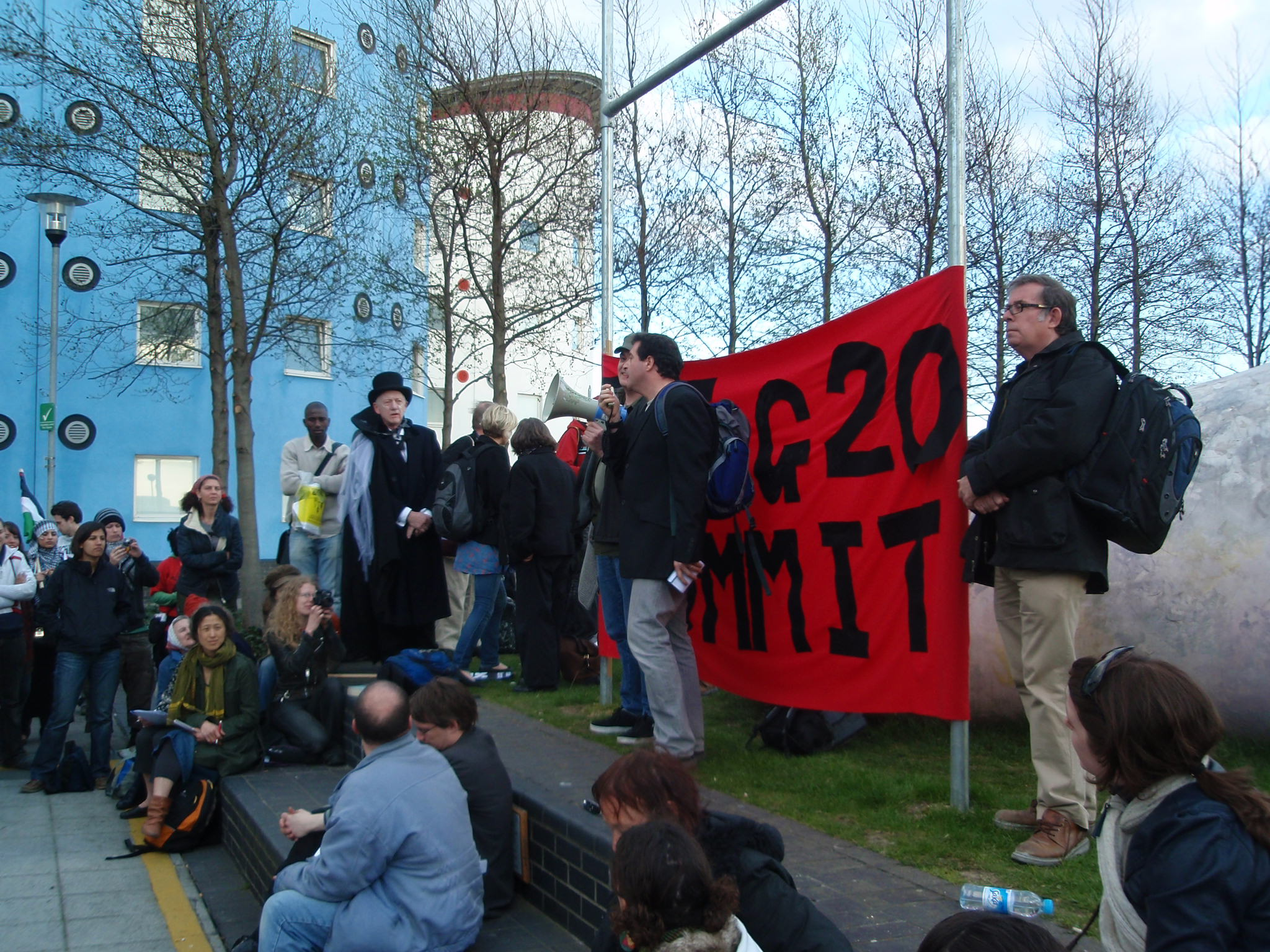
Mark Thomas – 1 April

An "alternative G20 Summit" with speakers including Tony Benn, Ken Loach, Ken Livingstone, John McDonnell and Caroline Lucas was scheduled to take place at the University of East London, which is close to where the main G20 Summit was held. At the last minute the university announced that the whole university would close for the duration of the summit on safety grounds, also that Prof Chris Knight, an expert in anthropology at the University for 20 years, had been suspended for "inciting criminal action, specifically violence against policemen and women and damage to banking institutions", and that the alternative summit was cancelled. In the event, the summit did go ahead and was held on the lawns of the university and started an hour later than planned; 200–300 people attended.

== Policing ==
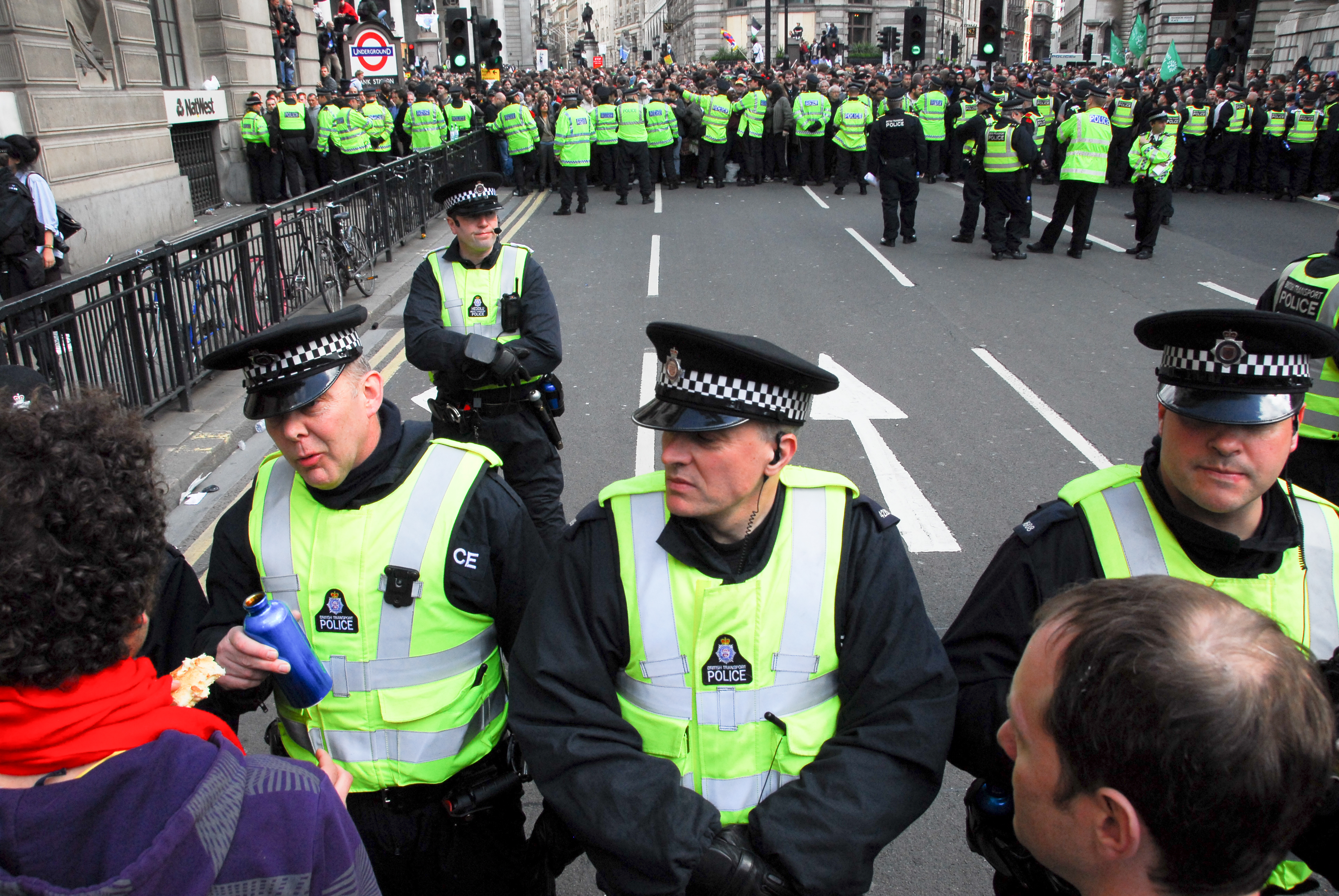
Police lines at the G20 Meltdown protest

=== Operation Glencoe ===
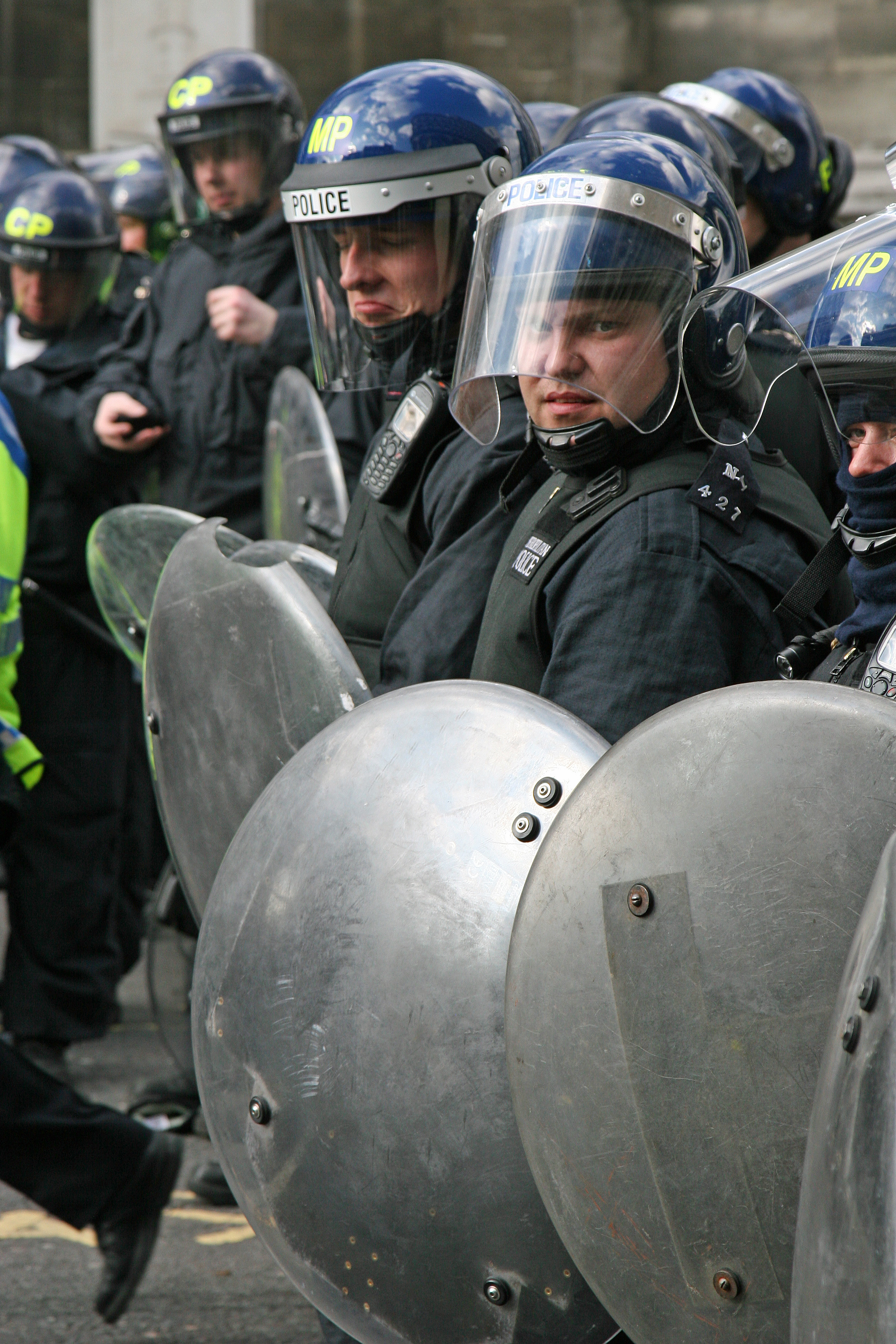
Riot police at the protest

Scotland Yard officers drew up Operation Glencoe, the plan to protect the summit and prevent disorder. The overall commander (the Gold commander) was Commander Bob Broadhurst.

Before the event Commander Simon O'Brien said that the capital would see "almost unprecedented level of activity" of protest activity with seven officially notified demonstrations and possibly many more they don't know about. Scotland Yard described the G20 policing plan as one of the largest, most challenging and complicated public order operations it has ever devised. They said that the level and style of activity on the internet suggested a re-emergence of groups with similar aims to the anti-globalisation protesters who turned to violence in 2000 and 2001. They said they were determined to avoid the violent scenes of the 2001 G8 in Genoa in which one protester was killed and hundreds more injured. In the days leading up to the summit, the Metropolitan police warned protest groups that the protests on 1 April would be "very violent" and that they were "up for it, and up to it" in the event of trouble.

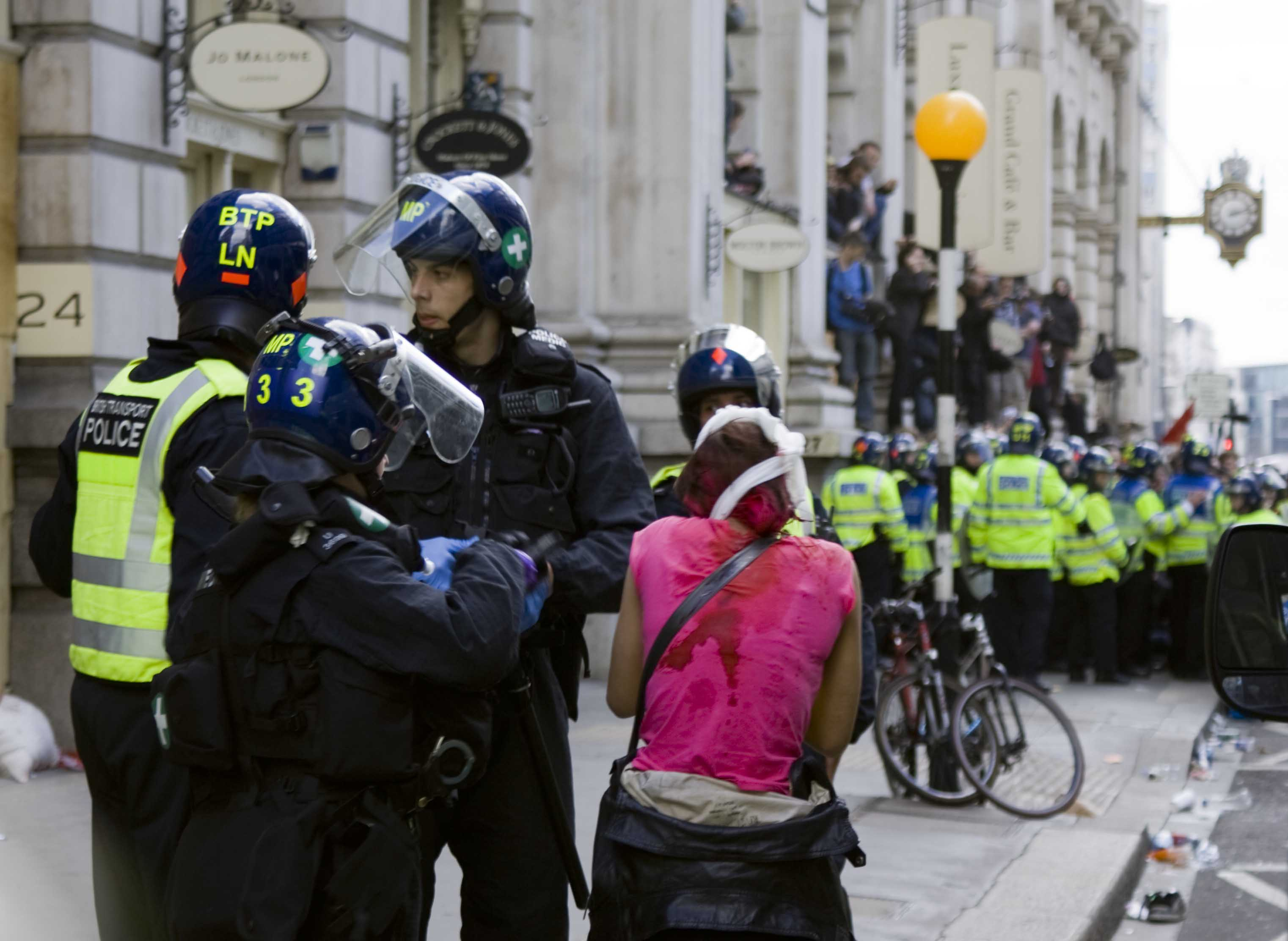
An injured protester with police medics

The police used the crowd-control tactic known as containment or the “kettle”, to hold 5,000 people inside a police cordon without food, drink or lavatory facilities. This combined with riot police pushing into crowds with shields and batons.

Ian Tomlinson died after being shoved and struck by a police officer within a police cordon of the G20 Meltdown protest near the Bank of England. Initially, the City of London Police denied that any incident with the police had occurred, and the death was attributed to natural causes. One week, later video evidence emerged of a Metropolitan police officer pushing Tomlinson to the ground.

Including a number of raids on squats on 2 April 2009, the police made over 100 arrests and said they had identified and would track down those who had broken the law. A teenage girl was convicted of criminal damage An estimated 5,000 people took part in the protests. The Daily Telegraph suggested that the policing of the event would turn out to have been the most expensive police operation in British history at an estimated cost of up to £8 million, or £1,600 per protester.

One raid on a climate change group the day after the main protests was ruled to have been illegal in March 2010, the Met Commissioner said that it was unlawful to arrest and search protestors and to force them to be recorded on film. Two protesters were each awarded £3000 compensation after the Met admitted the operation was unlawful as there were no reasonable grounds for suspicion.

=== Response to police tactics ===
The police choice of "Operation Glencoe" as a codename was linked with the Glencoe Massacre. In the buildup to the protests the chairman of the Joint Committee on Human Rights, Andrew Dismore, MP, said that "The police have a duty under the Human Rights Act to facilitate protest and not frustrate it. If they act in a confrontational way and use confrontation language, they will start to provoke the kind of behaviour they are seeking to prevent. There may well be a fringe element that want to incite violence. But that doesn't mean police should criminalise every protester." David Howarth, a Liberal Democrat MP, said: "I am increasingly worried that what the police are saying about the protests will end up in a self-fulfilling prophecy. By talking up the prospect of violence they [the police] will put off peaceful demonstrators and start to attract other sorts."

Jenny Jones, a member of the Metropolitan Police Authority, said of reports of police brutality that "If the police were hitting people who were sitting down with their hands up, we have entered a new era of overt violent policing in Britain that will deter people from protesting and cut back our civil liberties". A police Commander said that their "tactics were proportionate and worked". Jean Lambert, MEP, of the London Green Party, wrote an open letter to the Metropolitan Police Commissioner after the event asking for an explanation of the police tactics at the climate camp.

A number of allegations of police misconduct have been reported, including by a press photographer. The IPCC has received 185 complaints relating to police actions at the demonstrations, 40 of which were ineligible and 80 of which concern violence. An officer is being investigated and has received a written warning after writing "Rob Ward can't wait to bash some long haired hippys up @ the G20" as a Facebook status update on the evening of 1 April. Liberal Democrat MP Chris Huhne has noted "the canteen culture of some parts of the Met".

The National Union of Journalists has considered taking legal action after Section 14 of the Public Order Act 1986 was used against journalists covering the protests on 2 April. The City of London police asked them to leave the area at the Royal Exchange for half an hour, and threatened arrest if they refused. Section 14 is to prevent "serious public disorder, serious criminal damage or serious disruption to the life of the community". The police earlier apologised to journalists reporting the 1 April protests at the Bank of England: "Section 14 was applied outside the Bank of England to disperse protesters. There may have been some photographers caught up in that. If so we apologise. We respect the right of photographers to cover current events."

Sir Paul Stephenson, the Metropolitan Police Commissioner, expressed "concern that the video footage of some police actions are clearly disturbing and should be thoroughly investigated", and a need to be reassured that the use of the containment, or kettling tactic "remains appropriate and proportionate". Denis O'Connor has said that some police behaviour "fell short of the police medal promise to "guard my people"." Others have defended the policing of the protests. Sir Ken Jones, the President of the Association of Chief Police Officers, has criticised the lack of objectivity which he perceives has been shown by the media. Jones went onto question the views put forward by Nick Hardwick, the Chair of the IPCC. Jones also stated that he "can't think of any other country that doesn't use water cannons, CS gas, rubber bullets". The Police Federation has also criticised the IPCC, making a formal complaint about the "deplorable behaviour" of Nick Hardwick, Chairman of the IPCC, for passing "lofty and withering judgment on London's police officers". Home Office minister Lord West of Spithead said in the House of Lords that "thousands of officers acted absolutely professionally and proportionately, thousands were actually able to demonstrate peacefully on our streets, criminal activity in the rest of the metropolis was kept to an absolute minimum and the police also maintained high levels of security. And I think we should be extremely proud of them. This does not excuse acts which are criminal and there are now investigations taking place for those particulars." The Mayor of London, Boris Johnson, has defended the police, and said that "I worry that there are large sections of the media that are currently engaged in a very unbalanced orgy of cop bashing".

=== Nicola Fisher video ===
On 14 April, media outlets published video taken during a vigil for Ian Tomlinson on 2 April outside the Bank of England, near to where he died. A sergeant with the Territorial Support Group is seen slapping a woman who was arguing with him, Nicola Fisher, across the face, then striking her legs with his baton. The officer's identification number was concealed. The IPCC said it would investigate, and the officer was suspended. Sir Paul Stephenson said that uniformed officers should always display their shoulder identification numbers, as "The public has a right to be able to identify any uniformed officer whilst performing their duty." In September 2009, the officer was named as Sgt Delroy 'Tony' Smellie, and the CPS announced that it would charge him with assault. The court case against Delroy Smellie commenced in March 2010 and he has been found not guilty.

Another demonstrator, Katie Surridge, has alleged that she was pushed to the ground from behind on 1 April by the same officer who later struck Nicola Fisher. That incident has also been reported to the IPCC. IPCC have announced that there is no case to answer.

=== Review of the policing of public events ===
On 15 April 2009, Metropolitan Police Commissioner Sir Paul Stephenson asked the Chief Inspector of Constabulary to review policing tactics in the policing of public events. Denis O'Connor will review the policing of public events following allegations of two assaults by police during the G20 protests in London on 1 April. He will also assess whether the tactic of containment or kettling is appropriate and proportionate to ensuring people have the right to protest. He said the event was a "complex policing operation", and that footage of clashes with police will be reviewed to check if other incidents need to be examined. Sir Paul stressed that all uniformed officers must wear shoulder identification numbers to be easily identifiable by the public. Among the tactics being reviewed is the crowd-control tactic known as the “kettle”, used to pen in protesters. Bob Broadhurst, the commanding officer during the protests, blamed any misconduct of officers on the lack of training they receive in crowd control and on fear. He revealed during a Commons Home Affairs Committee that officers only receive 2 days of training a year.

On Tuesday 25 January 2011, Broadhurst apologised to the home affairs select committee for telling then in May 2009 that no plain-clothes officers were present at the demonstrations; He admitted that numerous City of London police officers had been present at the demonstration, along with more than one Met officer, including PC Mark Kennedy.

On 14 April 2011 the high court has ruled that the Metropolitan police broke the law in the way they "kettled" protesters at the G20 demonstrations in 2009, and also criticised the use of force by officers.

== Death of Ian Tomlinson ==
Ian Tomlinson, a newspaper vendor in the City of London, died within a police cordon of the G20 Meltdown protest near the Bank of England. Initially the City of London Police denied that any incident with the police had occurred, and the death was attributed to natural causes. Days later, The Guardian published video showing Tomlinson had been pushed by a Metropolitan Police Service officer and hit with a baton minutes before he collapsed and died.

The Independent Police Complaints Commission (IPCC) subsequently ordered a second post mortem and set up an independent criminal inquiry to determine whether Tomlinson was assaulted by police, and whether that assault contributed to his death. The results of this second post mortem have revealed that Tomlinson actually died from an abdominal haemorrhage caused by the baton strike. A police officer was questioned under caution about Tomlinson's death.
