= Bevins Prize =

British award

The Bevins Prize is a British award recognising outstanding investigative journalism. Established in 2008, it is named after the journalist Anthony Bevins (1942 - 2001) and awarded by the Bevins Trust. Also known as the "Rat up a Drainpipe Award", the Prize's trophy is modelled on a drain pipe.

== Winners ==
- 2008: Deborah Haynes
- 2009: Paul Lewis
- 2010: Clare Sambrook
