= Custodial deaths in the United Kingdom =

Police and prison custody deaths

Deaths in custody, including police and prison custody, are subject to significant concern for a number of reasons, including the intrinsically vulnerable nature of some of those in custody, and the power imbalance inherent in the situation. Deaths in custody in England and Wales are looked at by inquests, and when it is possible that the state failed to protect the deceased's life are scrutinised using the 'right to life' (Article 2 of the European Convention on Human Rights).

Inquest is an independent charity focusing predominantly on deaths in custody. Working in England and Wales the charity supports families bereaved by state related deaths, including deaths in police and prison custody.

== Statistics ==
The Independent Police Complaints Commission (IPCC) publishes annual reports on deaths during or following police contact.

The Ministry of Justice publishes quarterly "Safety in Custody statistics" looking at deaths and incidents of self-harm and violence in prisons in England and Wales. In the year up to March 2017 this statistical report showed the highest number of deaths in prison on record, with the rate of self-inflicted deaths more than doubling since 2013, and the number of incidents of self-harm reaching a record high. There were 113 self-inflicted deaths in the 12 months up to March 2017, 10 of which were in the female estate.

The charity Inquest monitors statistics and updates on deaths in police custody, prison and immigration detention, regularly updating live statistical tables on their website.

The Home Office does not regularly publish information on deaths in immigration detention, but campaigners and monitoring bodies keep track and found 2017 was the deadliest year on record of immigration detainees.

The Youth Justice Board (YJB) reports on deaths of children in child prisons (young offenders institutions and secure training centres) and secure children's homes in their remit.

== Independent Review into Deaths and Serious Incidents in Police Custody, 2017 ==
In October 2017 the UK government published the first ever Independent review on deaths and serious incidents in police custody, known as the Angiolini Review, after the author Dame Elish Angiolini KC. Inquest's director Deborah Coles was special adviser to the review. The report made over 100 recommendations on policing, mental health provision, and post-death investigations and inquests including that such deaths should be investigated "with the same haste and mindset as homicides" and that families bereaved by a death in custody should receive non means-tested public funding for legal representation during investigations and inquest's into custody deaths. Other recommendations included:

- Strengthening systems and structures of accountability, holding the police to account at an individual and corporate level.
- National Oversight and learning from deaths, such as through an 'Office for Article 2 Compliance' which would monitor and report on recommendations arising from deaths.
- Improved investigation, including through the phasing out of Ex-police officers as lead investigators within the IPCC.
- Tackling discrimination, through recognition of the disproportionate number of deaths of Black, Asian and minority ethnic (BAME) people following restraint and the role of institutional racism, both within IPCC investigations and police training.
- Better treatment of vulnerable people, including through proper resourcing of national healthcare facilities to accommodate and respond to vulnerable people in urgent physical or mental health need coming into contact with the police.

The report was commissioned in July 2015 by then Home Secretary Theresa May. She announced the review after meeting the families of Sean Rigg and Olaseni 'Seni' Lewis, stating: "As Home Secretary, I have been struck by the pain and suffering of families still looking for answers. That is why I set up this independent review and I'm grateful to Dame Elish and Deborah Coles, as special advisor to the chair, for agreeing to take on this important work."

The charity Inquest advised the review after years of lobbying for it to take place. They welcomed the report as "an opportunity to save lives". However the report was due to be published in January 2017 and the Home Office faced widespread criticism from Inquest and other charities and campaigners for delaying its publication, including in an open letter to newHome Secretary Amber Rudd, published in The Guardian in July 2017 which was signed by over 30 organisations. During the 10-month delay to publish the review, the deaths of Rashan Charles and Edson Da Costa in contact with London's Metropolitan Police reignited widespread public concern about deaths in custody, particularly those concerning restraint related deaths of young Black men.

== Deaths of children and young adults in prisons ==
Up to date statistics on the deaths of young adults in prisons are kept by Inquest on their website. The Youth Justice Board (YJB) reports on deaths of children in prisons in their remit (YOI and STC).

There have been a small number of little publicised deaths in secure children's homes, as well as deaths in STCs and YOIs.

In the year ending March 2016, there were no self-inflicted deaths of children (aged under 18) in youth justice prisons according to the YJB. There was one death in July 2015, of 16-year-old Daniel Adewole at HMYOI Cookham Wood. Adewole's death was classified as death by 'natural causes' as he died following an epileptic seizure, however the coroner at his inquest highlighted failures of prison staff in properly responding to the death. Coroner Patricia Harding concluded that prison officers should have entered the cell of Daniel Adewole much sooner as officers waited 38 minutes after they first received no response at Adewole's cell door, before opening his door where he was found unconscious following an epileptic seizure.

Prior to that, there were three deaths during the year ending March 2012. Between the years ending March 2006 and March 2016, there were six deaths.

Between 1990 and 2004, 25 children killed themselves in prison and two died in secure training centres. On 19 April 2004, a 15-year-old boy, Gareth Myatt, died while being restrained by guards at Rainsbrook Secure Training Centre which at the time was run by G4S. Several months afterwards on 9 August 2004, Adam Rickwood, 14, died of a self-inflicted death at the (now closed) Hassockfield Secure Training Centre, hours after being restrained by staff. The inquest jury into Rickwood's death did not find a direct link between the restraint and his death, but it was clear that this was a distressing incident and critics drew links between the incident and his suicide.

=== Harris Review: Changing Prisons, Saving Lives ===
Chaired by Lord Toby Harris and published in July 2015, the Harris Review is an independent review into self-inflicted deaths in custody of 18 to 24 year olds from 1 April 2007 to 31 December 2013. It made 108 recommendations to strengthen the protection of young people in prisons and support learning after self-inflicted deaths in prison. The report was welcomed by campaigners, calling it a 'watershed moment'.

The Government responded in December 2017, rejecting 33 of the recommendations and simply stating 'agree', 'agree in part', 'agree in principle', or stating the recommendation was beyond its remit or 'subject to wider reforms for the majority of the rest. The majority of recommendations are yet to be implemented.

== List of campaigns around people who have died in custody in the UK ==
- Terence MacSwiney
- Thomas Ashe
- Michael Fitzgerald
- Frank Stagg
- Michael Gaughan
- Patrick "Giuseppe" Conlon
- Bobby Sands
- Death of Sarah Reed
- Death of Sean Rigg
- Death of Habib 'Paps' Ullah
- Death of Roger Sylvester
- Death of Leon Patterson
- Death of Rocky Bennett
- Death of Christopher Alder
- Death of Brian Douglas
- Death of Joy Gardner
- Death of Ricky Bishop
- Death of Sarah Campbell
- Death of Mark Nunes
- Death of Paul Coker
- Death of Paul Jemmott
- Death of Harry Stanley
- Death of Glenn Howard
- Death of Mikey Powell
- Death of Jason McPherson
- Death of Lloyd Butler
- Death of Azelle Rodney
- Death of Habib Ullah
- Death of Olaseni Lewis
- Death of David Emmanuel (aka Smiley Culture)
- Death of Kingsley Burrell
- Death of Demetre Fraser
- Death of Mark Duggan
- Death of Anthony Grainger
- Death of Sheku Bayoh
- Killing of Alton Manning
- Death of Hal Woolf
- Murder of Henry Nowak
