= Death of Olaseni Lewis =

Policing incident in the United Kingdom

Olaseni Lewis
- Photograph of Lewis shortly before his death
- Born: 22 March 1987
- Died: 3 September 2010 (aged 23); Bethlem Royal Hospital, Beckenham, London, England
- Cause of death: Cerebral hypoxia
- Education: Kingston University
- Known for: Death after restraint by 11 Metropolitan Police officers

Olaseni Lewis, a 23-year-old British man, died on 3 September 2010 at Bethlem Royal Hospital in London, United Kingdom, after police subjected him to prolonged physical restraint. Lewis had voluntarily sought care following the onset of acute mental health issues and died from cerebral hypoxia (lack of oxygen to the brain) soon after, following actions that involved eleven officers of London's Metropolitan Police. After seven years of campaigning by Lewis' family and two inquiries by the Independent Police Complaints Commission (IPCC), a second coroners' inquiry was raised.

The inquiry ruled the restraint was disproportionate and found the officers had failed to follow training on both the restraint of people with medical conditions and treatment of non-responsive people. Bethlem was also judged to have had several failures in Lewis's assessment, treatment and care. The IPCC recommended a review of six police officers for gross misconduct in relation to the incident, but all were later cleared by the Metropolitan Police in closed hearings. South London and Maudsley NHS Foundation Trust, the body managing Bethlem, received no charges, though it made changes to its internal processes as a result.

The Mental Health Units (Use of Force) Bill 2018, known as "Seni's Law", was passed into British law in November 2018, making several provisions to limit the use of force on mental health patients and to require police officers working in mental health units to wear police body cameras where reasonable. It also required that hospitals record data and release reports on incidents involving physical force, including data on age, gender and ethnicity of those restrained. All reports covering patient deaths must be reviewed by the Secretary of State in an annual review.

Lewis's death returned to national attention in 2020 following the George Floyd protests in the United Kingdom, in relation to the disproportionate number of black, Asian and minority ethnic people killed by UK law enforcement officers.

== Background ==
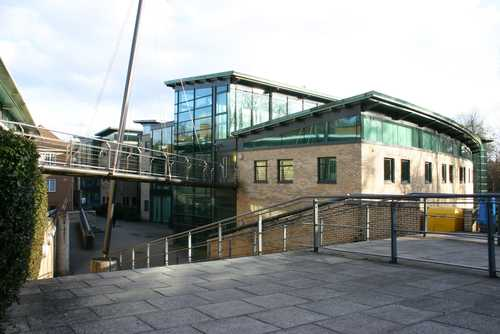
Lewis's alma mater Kingston University

Born to Ajibola Lewis (a Nigerian-born lawyer) and Conrad Lewis (an engineer), Olaseni Lewis (known as Seni) was a Black British man from South Norwood in south-east London. He grew up there with his two older sisters and was well known in his neighbourhood, having given neighbours lifts in his car. He attended Kingston University in south London and, regarded as a bright student, went on to study a master's degree in business and information technology there.

Lewis had no history of violence, nor mental health issues prior to the events leading to his death. A tall man, evidence in his case described him as a "gentle giant", who protected his friends against bullies.

== Events leading to death ==
Following the UK summer bank holiday weekend, Lewis suffered an acute psychotic illness over a period of 48 hours in late August 2010. He returned home from an evening out on 30 August and was agitated, telling his mother that his friends had given him a bad substance. After discussion, Lewis told his mother that he would go to bed and try to sleep off the effects. He continued to be in a state of agitation the following day and his mother called NHS Direct.

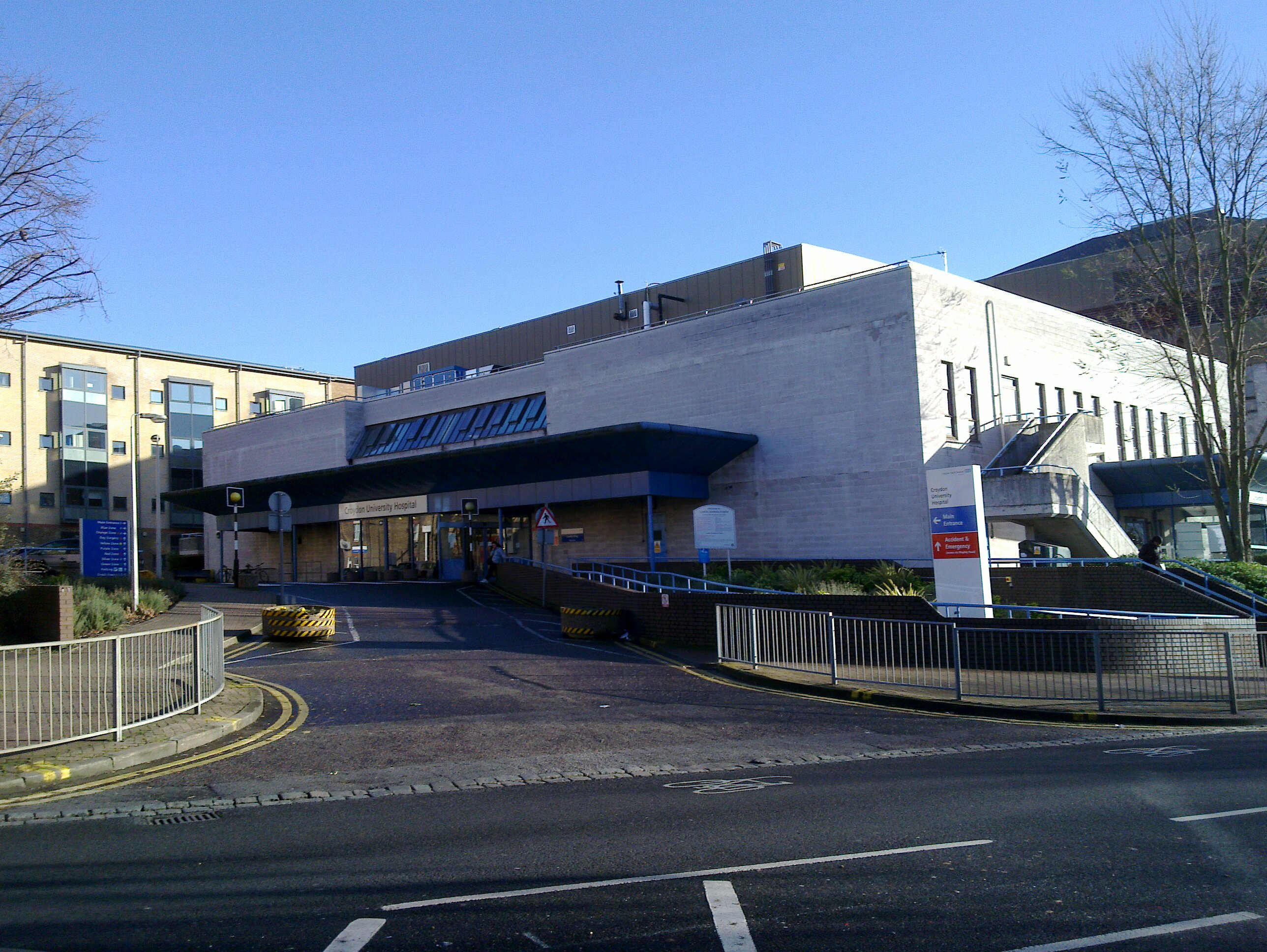
Mayday University Hospital, where Lewis was first admitted

Responding to his deteriorating mental condition, his family took him to nearby Mayday University Hospital in Croydon. CCTV during his time at Mayday showed him struggling to remain still, asking for help, and hugging staff and security. Lewis's state caused accident and emergency doctors there to ask his family to agree that he be taken to a place of safety, under section 136 of the Mental Health Act 1983.

He was transferred and admitted to a safety suite at Maudsley Hospital soon after, where he was medicated. His father Conrad and friend Omari Faria arrived during this time. That afternoon he left the hospital and walked to nearby Denmark Hill railway station. His father, Faria and hospital staff pursued him to encourage him to return to the hospital and Lewis went back to Maudsley after police were called.

Upon returning to Maudsley, Lewis was voluntarily readmitted but managers stated that due to his home address he would have to be transferred to Bethlem Royal Hospital, a well-known psychiatric hospital in London also known as Bedlam. Ajibola Lewis reflected that a nurse at Maudsley advised her not to send her son there, saying "as a young black man in London, it's very easy to be picked on" and a doctor suggested she treat the issue as a "one-off". Lewis was briefly discharged to his mother's care, but feeling unable to cope she then agreed that Lewis go to Bethlem on a voluntary basis.

== Police restraint and death ==
Lewis and his parents travelled to Bethlem on the evening of 31 August and on their arrival his mother described a chaotic scene. Lewis voluntarily admitted himself to the hospital on the basis that he could leave if he desired and that his family would be contacted in the event of any problem. At 8:30pm his parents were told to leave as visiting hours had finished. Lewis's state deteriorated after his parents had left and he decided to leave the hospital. However, staff prevented him from leaving and Lewis subsequently caused criminal damage to a door. Staff did not contact his parents but instead called the police to report Lewis for criminal damage.

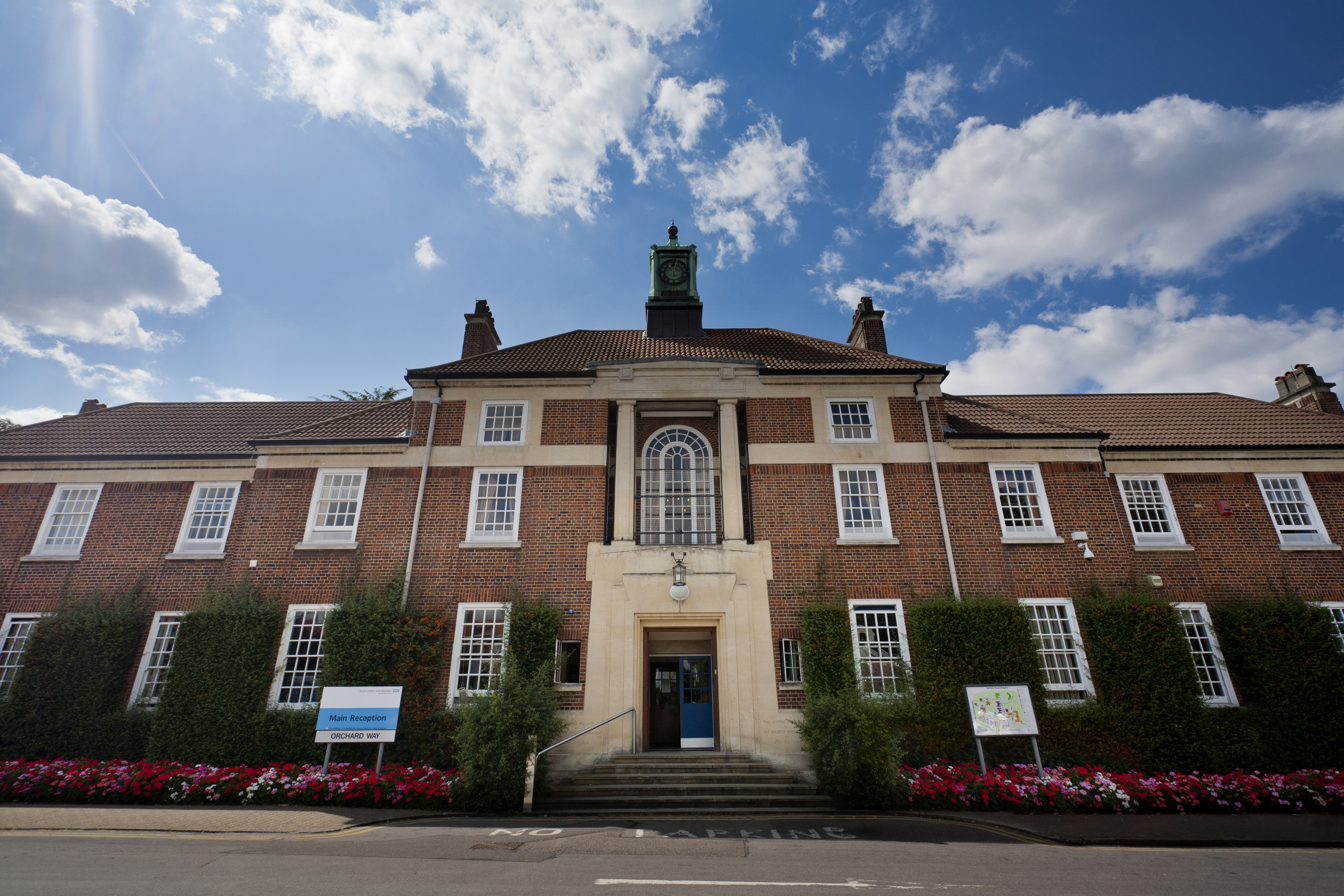
Exterior of Bethlem Hospital, where Lewis was restrained

Police arrived soon after and placed Lewis in handcuffs and moved him to a padded room at the hospital. Over a period of 30–40 minutes eleven police officers subjected him to restraint in the room for a period of ten minutes. After Lewis tried to leave the room, officers restrained him for a second time for a period of 20 minutes. They placed him in two sets of handcuffs, which left Lewis with his left arm locked in front of his head and his right arm locked behind his back. They also placed him in leg restraints, one set around his ankles and one set around his legs. The method of restraint was against police practice and was later judged as dangerous. Lewis was held down face first on a bed, then the floor. The police struck him three times with a police baton during this period.

Lewis was confused during the restraint, calling for police to take their dogs off him. The police asserted that for his safety they continued to restrain him until he stopped resisting. Lewis fell unconscious after 20 minutes due to restricted breathing and police chose to leave him in the room, believing him to be faking unconsciousness. Medical staff then injected Lewis with an antipsychotic medication. Nurses logged the incident as having involved "violent restraint" which indicated that unnecessary force had been used. Staff at the hospital reported they had been outraged at the level of force used.

When it was noticed that Lewis had stopped breathing, officers attempted cardiopulmonary resuscitation. An ambulance was called and Lewis was transferred back to Mayday Hospital. Lewis again began to breathe independently in the ambulance. Subsequent hospital assessments on late 3 September and early 4 September showed he had suffered brainstem death and his life-support system was turned off.

== Aftermath ==
=== Initial coroner's investigation ===
Coroner Dr Roy Palmer began investigations into Lewis's death on 13 September. He concluded the cause of death was cerebral hypoxia (lack of oxygen to the brain) brought on by restraint. Palmer noted a lack of communication between police and medical staff, that police had not administered basic life support per standard training, and that medical staff did not respond to Lewis's critical condition.

=== Calls for inquiry ===
Given that there was no statutory requirement for a formal investigation of deaths in police custody, Lewis's family petitioned for an investigation and worked with organisations including police death charity Inquest and mental health charity Mind. Lewis died the same day as Colin Holt, another black man with mental health issues who was restrained by police.

In 2011, Lewis's family attended an annual march on Downing Street to protest the deaths of Black Britons in police custody. Despite a reduction in overall deaths in police custody, the number of deaths of Black British people had not fallen. The families of others who died in police custody, including Jimmy Mubenga, Kingsley Burrell, Jacob Michael, Smiley Culture and Mark Duggan, attended the march. Labour MP Jeremy Corbyn questioned the Home Secretary in Parliament on what would be done to address the issue.

Delays to the inquiry led Lewis' family to campaign for its proper conclusion, with his mother attending the United Friends and Families Campaign march in London in October 2012.

In January 2015 Theresa May, then Home Secretary, met with Lewis's family to discuss the case. The death of Lewis, among others, contributed to the creation of a Commons Select Committee review of Policing and Mental Health in 2015.

=== Police investigation ===
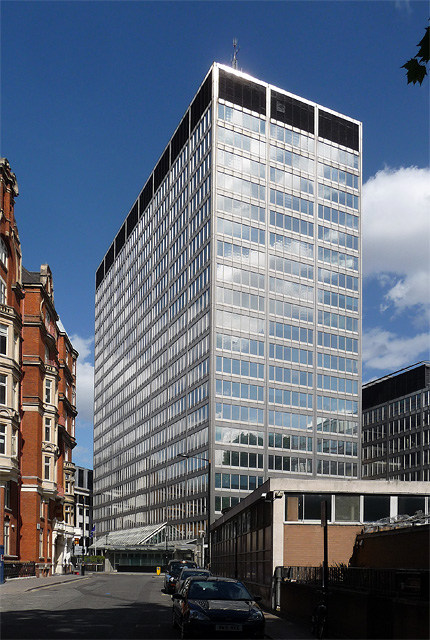
New Scotland Yard, the headquarters of the Metropolitan Police

An initial inquiry in 2011 by the Independent Police Complaints Commission (IPCC) first cleared officers over the death and noted that no disciplinary measures were required. After a new inquiry opened into the death of Sean Rigg, another Black British man with mental health issues who died in police custody, the IPCC announced it would also review its original investigation of the Lewis case. The family of Lewis took their case to the High Court of Justice to challenge the inquiry. In an unusual series of events, the IPCC paid their legal fees and backed their move to quash its own inquiry, which had failed to test officers' version of events and made no investigation into whether officers had committed a criminal offence. The High Court ruled in the families favour in September 2013

Following the conclusion of a second IPCC inquiry and a review by a Queen's Counsel in early 2013, the Crown Prosecution Service (CPS) noted that there was insufficient evidence to bring a conviction against the officers who restrained Lewis. The CPS referred the case back to the IPCC in order to adjudge if internal disciplinary measures were required. Raju Bhatt, the solicitor for the Lewis family, said he was not surprised by this outcome but would continued to push for full investigation of the incident in the face of "four-and-a-half years of prevarication and worse".

In May 2016 a senior coroner raised concerns about the standard of statements provided by staff at Bethlem, as their impartiality would be affected by the fact that their legal representation was being paid for by their employer, South London and Maudsley NHS Foundation Trust, which was involved in the case for corporate manslaughter.

A disciplinary hearing conducted by the Metropolitan Police found the six officers (PC Simon Smith, PC Michael Aldridge, PC Stephen Boyle, DC Laura Curran, PC Ian Simpson and PC James Smith) had not committed misconduct and no disciplinary action was taken. The hearing was criticised by the family, because it was held behind closed doors with neither press nor public scrutiny.

=== Coroners inquiry ===
A coroners inquest by the South London Coroners Court was completed on 28 June 2017. It noted several concerns during his investigation. He noted that the police officers had used excessive force, had poor training on restraint, were not clear on the definition of "prolonged restraint", and had no guidance on how to react if efforts to restrain had not been successful for a long period. Officers also did not properly recognise that Lewis was having an "acute behavioural disturbance" (ABD) and may be at risk of death.

The inquiry remarked on the fact that ABD is a police definition with no medical basis and that officers may be better served by general guidance on risks when restraining mentally ill people. The division of duties and responsibilities between police and medical staff were unclear. It was also noted that police were called as a result of a lack of available and trained medical staff.

At coroner's inquest the jury found many failures by both police and medical staff which played a part in Lewis's death. They said "The excessive force, pain compliance techniques and multiple mechanical restraints were disproportionate and unreasonable. On the balance of probability, this contributed to the cause of death." However, the jury did not record a verdict of unlawful killing.

Police were trained to view Lewis's behaviour as a medical emergency but the jury found police failed to act on this. The jury found that "The police failed to follow their training, which requires them to place an unresponsive person into the recovery position and if necessary administer life support. On the balance of probability this also contributed to the cause of death." A doctor did not act when Lewis became unresponsive while his heart rate dramatically slowed.

Deborah Coles of the charity Inquest said the jury had reached the most damning possible conclusions on the actions of police and medics. "This was a most horrific death. Eleven police officers were involved in holding down a terrified young man until his complete collapse, legs and hands bound in limb restraints, while mental health staff stood by. Officers knew the dangers of this restraint but chose to go against clear, unequivocal training. Evidence heard at this inquest raises the question of how racial stereotyping informed Seni's brutal treatment."

=== Seni's Law ===
Lewis's family worked with their solicitor, Raju Bhatt, to draft a proposed change to UK law in order to prevent unnecessary and excessive restraint in mental health units and require psychiatric hospitals to give more detailed information about how and when restraints are used. This gained the support of Steve Reed, the Labour Member of Parliament for Croydon North, who took it to the House of Commons as a private member's bill. This included increased gathering and transparency of data in hospitals on incidents involving physical force, including data on age, gender and ethnicity of those restrained. All reports covering patient deaths must be reviewed by the Secretary of State in an annual review. The law also mandated the use of police body cameras when officers were engaging with vulnerable people.

In November 2017 the bill, referred to as "Seni's law", was debated. On its second reading it failed to pass in June 2018, despite the support of the Conservative government, due to a two-and-a-half-hour filibuster by Philip Davies, MP for Shipley, who had a history of filibustering private members bills. The bill passed the commons on its third reading in July 2018. In November 2018, the bill received Royal Assent as the Mental Health Units (Use of Force) Act 2018.

In 2018, the Metropolitan Police and South London and Maudsley NHS Foundation Trust, announced the introduction of the "Seni Lewis Award", which would be awarded to people nationally at the annual Positive Practice Mental Health Awards in recognition of efforts to improve collaboration between health services and police.

=== Black Lives Matter protests ===
The case of Lewis returned to national attention in June 2020 in connection with the George Floyd protests in the United Kingdom and other protests associated with the Black Lives Matter movement. Lewis's death was highlighted as an example of the disproportionate number of black, Asian and minority ethnic people killed in police custody.

== See also ==
- Death of Christopher Alder
- Death of Colin Roach
- Death of Oluwashijibomi Lapite
- Death of Roger Sylvester
- Death of Sean Rigg
- Death of Sheku Bayoh
