= Death of Sheku Bayoh =

2015 death in Scottish police custody

Sheku Ahmed Tejan Bayoh (30 September 1983 – 3 May 2015) died after being restrained by police in Kirkcaldy, Scotland. He had been acting out of character after he took a cocktail of drugs including MDMA and Flakka, before being arrested. His death sparked controversy and an independent government inquiry followed the investigation by the Police Investigations and Review Commissioner (PIRC). In May 2018, the Bayoh family brought legal action against the Chief Constable of Police Scotland, seeking £1.85 million damages for Bayoh's "unlawful killing", which was settled out of court.

== Life ==
Bayoh was born in Sierra Leone. In 1995 he fled to the United Kingdom as an unaccompanied child to escape civil war in Sierra Leone. After living in London for five years, he moved to Fife, Scotland at the invitation of his sister, who had lived there since the 1990s. At the time of his death, Bayoh was training to be a gas engineer. He was a father to two sons.

== Death ==
On the morning of 3 May 2015, Bayoh visited a friend's house to watch TV. His friends noticed he was acting out of character after he took a cocktail of drugs including MDMA and Flakka, which can cause hyperstimulation, paranoia, and hallucinations. He left their property and went home. After he returned home, a fight broke out between Bayoh and his friend, Zahid Saeed. Zahid fled and Bayoh then took a large kitchen knife and left his house. Concerned neighbours called emergency services to report a man with a knife acting erratically, chasing cars and trying to get into cars. Police were dispatched. When the initial Police Scotland response arrived at the scene, Bayoh ignored their instructions to get down on the ground choosing to continue walking towards them. As other constables arrived at the scene, Bayoh refused to listen to instructions and began to walk away ignoring police commands. He then turned on PC Nicole Short, chasing her, punching her to the back of the head as she ran away, knocking her to the ground, where he thereafter stamped and kicked at her torso while she lay unconscious in the middle of Hayfield Road. Officers rugby tackled Bayoh after he failed to respond to baton strikes during his attack on PC Short. Bayoh continued to fight and resist arrest and a short time later lost consciousness. Officers immediately commenced CPR and requested an ambulance. he was pronounced dead in hospital. A post-mortem report revealed injuries to Bayoh's head and face, burst blood eye vessels (consistent with positional asphyxiation), bruising across his body, a fractured rib, and the presence of the street drugs MDMA and Flakka. His cause of death was recorded as "sudden death in a man intoxicated … [drugs] whilst under restraint".

== Investigations ==
=== Police investigation ===
Following his hospitalisation, the Police Investigations and Review Commissioner (PIRC) began an investigation into the circumstances surrounding Bayoh's death. After 16 months, the PIRC submitted its investigation report to the Lord Advocate James Wolffe for review. In October 2018, the Lord Advocate determined that no criminal, corporate or health and safety charges would be brought against the police involved. In December 2018, Bayoh's family requested a review of the decision after CCTV and mobile phone footage emerged of his encounter with police which the family felt contradicted police accounts. Wolffe upheld his decision stating that, based on the evidence available, there would be no criminal proceedings against the police.

=== Independent public inquiry ===
In November 2019, the Scottish Government's then Justice Secretary Humza Yousaf announced an independent public inquiry into Bayoh's death. Judge Lord Bracadale was appointed as the Inquiry Chairman in January 2020. In May 2020, Yousaf announced the Terms of Reference, include establishing the circumstances of Bayoh's death; recommendations that might prevent similar deaths; examination of investigation procedures excluding the Lord Advocate's investigation; and whether events surrounding Bayoh's death and the actions of the police were influenced by his 'actual or perceived race.'

In November 2022, Lord Bracadale announced that he envisaged the Inquiry continuing into 2024. In February 2024, the deputy First Minister, Kate Forbes, announced that an investigation of the decision not to prosecute police officers would not be added to the remit of the ongoing inquiry. She further noted that "only the Crown Office can reconsider prosecution". It was reported that the inquiry would move on to closing submissions following the resolution of the query regarding the Terms of Reference. The chair pledged to produce a final report without delay. The inquiry heard a total of 122 days of evidence.

The total cost of the inquiry, as of 30 September 2025, was £26.2 million (£26,249,080). In addition, the cooperation and participation of Police Scotland in the inquiry has resulted in a £24.3 million spend from the policing budget which, for the financial year 2025–26 is £1.6 billion. On Tuesday 21 October 2025, the Chair of the Inquiry, Lord Bracadale, resigned. He concluded that many of the Inquiry's core participants had lost confidence in him due to a series of private meetings he had with Sheku Bayoh's family, without telling the other core participants. This led to an appearance of bias and unfairness. The Solicitor General for Scotland, Ruth Charteris KC, acknowledged that the resignation of Lord Bracadale would inevitably result in "further delay in concluding the inquiry" and "further cost to the public purse". On Friday 24 October 2025, it was announced that the inquiry's legal team had also resigned. This included Senior Counsel to the Inquiry: Angela Grahame KC, Laura Thomson KC, Jason Beer KC; and Junior Counsel to the Inquiry: Rachel Barrett and Sarah Loosemore. In December 2025, concerns were raised by MSPs within the Scottish Parliament that Humza Yousaf had not disclosed his close friendship with lawyer Ammar Anwar at the time that he had granted a public inquiry despite ministerial guidance that he should have. Anwar went on to financially benefit from representing the family of Bayoh through the inquiry. Investigations into this breach continue and to date Yousaf has chosen not to comment.

=== Civil action against Police Scotland ===
In May 2018, the Bayoh family brought legal action against the Chief Constable of Police Scotland, seeking £1.85m damages for Bayoh's "unlawful killing". In February 2024, the current Chief Constable Jo Farrell met with the Bayoh family. She was described as having offered "her apology for their ordeal" and "her condolences for their loss". In March 2024, it was reported that an out-of-court settlement had been agreed and that the family would receive a "substantial" payout. A spokesperson for the Scottish Police Federation said the organisation was "surprised" that Police Scotland had settled the claim prior to the conclusion of the independent public enquiry.

== Other responses ==
A co-production by the National Theatre of Scotland with the Edinburgh International Festival and the Royal Lyceum Theatre presented a play by Hannah Lavery entitledLament for Sheku Bayoh in 2020. The Guardian described the play as "a stark critique of Scotland's self-image". The recording was screened again in cinemas, in Leven and Edinburgh, during January 2023. The Edinburgh screening was also followed by a Q&A with Lavery and Aamer Anwar, who has been acting for the Bayoh family.

== See also ==
- Death of Christopher Alder
- Death of Colin Roach
- Death of Olaseni Lewis
- Death of Oluwashijibomi Lapite
- Death of Roger Sylvester
- Death of Sean Rigg
