= Inquest (charity) =

UK charity

- Founded: 1981
- Type: Charitable organisation
- Registration no.: 1046650
- Purpose: State-related deaths
- Location: Finsbury Park, London
- Region served: England and Wales
- Key people: Deborah Coles, Director
- Employees: 15
- Website: www.inquest.org.uk

Inquest Charitable Trust (stylised as INQUEST so as not to be confused with the legal process known as an inquest) is a charity concerned with state related deaths in England and Wales. It was founded in 1981. Inquest provides support on state-related deaths, including deaths in custody and their investigation, to bereaved people, lawyers, advice and support agencies, the media and parliamentarians.

Inquest's specialist casework includes deaths in police and prison custody, immigration detention, mental health settings and deaths involving multi-agency failings or where wider issues of state and corporate accountability are in question, such as the deaths and wider issues around the Hillsborough disaster and the Grenfell Tower fire. However they also have a handbook which is relevant to all families facing an inquest: The Inquest Handbook: a guide for bereaved families, friends and their advisors, for anyone dealing with an inquest, freely available online and also in print.

The director of Inquest is Deborah Coles, who has worked for the charity since 1989. She has been an independent expert adviser to numerous government committees and inquiries, is a regular media commentator, delivers conference papers nationally and internationally and has authored numerous articles and publications.

The chair of the trustees, as of June 2016, is solicitor Daniel Machover, The poet Benjamin Zephaniah is the charity's patron; his cousin Mikey Powell died in 2003 after being detained by police, for which West Midlands Police issued an apology in 2013.

Inquest are represented on the Ministerial Board on Deaths in Custody.

Inquest's logo includes the words "truth, justice and accountability" and an image of a keyhole.

Inquest Charitable Trust is a registered charity, number 1046650.

== Inquest's work ==
=== History ===
Inquest was founded in 1981 at a time of dissatisfaction with procedures for dealing with deaths in custody and at the hands of the police, and the failure of the official response to these deaths, in particular the deaths of Jimmy Kelly and Blair Peach. Both men died after being assaulted by police officers, and both of the inquests set up following their deaths denied their families access to relevant information.

Following a sustained campaign by Inquest, Peach's family and supporters the internal investigation of the Metropolitan Police (known as the Cass Report) was published. This report found that Blair Peach had been killed by a police officer, and then other officers lied in order to prevent this being made public.

Inquest's decades of work to improve the rights of bereaved people at inquests into contentious deaths led to the use of narrative conclusions at inquests and greater use of coroners’ reports to prevent future deaths. They used Article 2 of the European Convention on Human Rights to secure more wide-ranging inquests into deaths involving state bodies.

=== Campaigns and achievements ===
The organisation has successfully campaigned for reforms including: the establishment of independent investigations following deaths in police custody by the Independent Police Complaints Commission and prisons by Prisons and Probation Ombudsman in 2004, and the 2007 Corporate Manslaughter Act, which allows for companies and organisations to be held legally responsible for certain deaths. Inquest lobbied for, influenced and informed the Coroners and Justice Act 2009, and led the successful campaign to safeguard the post of the first Chief Coroner of England and Wales.

Inquest has lobbied for, advised on and provided expert evidence in a number of significant government reviews including the Corston Report into vulnerable women in prison; the Harris Review on self-inflicted deaths of young people in prison; and the cross-government Care Quality Commission review into the investigation of NHS deaths, among many others.

In 2015 it was announced by Theresa May, then the Home Secretary, that Inquest's director Deborah Coles would be a special adviser to Dame Elish Angiolini QC who was chairing the Independent Review Into Deaths and Serious Incidents in Police Custody, and Inquest would be involved in enabling bereaved families to give evidence to the inquiry. In October 2017 the report was published and made a range of recommendations which reflected the long-running work and aims of Inquest.

In 2016 Inquest used Freedom of Information requests to compile a report finding that at least nine young people had died since 2010 while in-patients in mental health units, and called for such deaths to be statutorily notified and investigated.

=== Hillsborough ===
Inquest supported families and their lawyers through the historic new Hillsborough inquests in 2016, which concluded with an unlawful killing finding for the first time and exonerated both survivors and the 96 people who died. They were then involved in a review on the experiences of Hillsborough families, published in October 2017 and chaired by Bishop James Jones. This review backed the proposed Hillsborough Law, formally titled The Public Authority (Accountability) Bill, which was first read in Parliament in March 2017 by Andy Burnham MP and received cross-party support. The bill would increase the accountability of public bodies and ensure bereaved families had equal legal representation at an inquest where state bodies are represented. Due to the 2017 UK General Election the bill dropped off the parliamentary calendar, but lawyers, MPs, Hillsborough families and Inquest are campaigning for it to be brought through Parliament again and implemented.

=== Prizes ===
In 2009 Inquest won the Longford Prize, an annual award in the field of social or penal reform. The judges commended Inquest's "remarkable perseverance, personal commitment and courage in an area too often under-investigated by the public authorities, and especially for its support for the families of those who have taken their own lives while in the care of the state".

Inquest has twice received the Liberty Human Rights Award in 2015 for their work uncovering serious human rights abuses of children in custody and in 2016 for their work with the family of Connor Sparrowhawk and Bindmans Solicitors to improve the standard of care provided for people with mental health and learning disabilities.

== Notable cases ==
Inquest have supported bereaved families, and assisted lawyers and supporters following deaths in custody and detention, notable cases include:

- Oluwashijibomi Lapite (died 1994)
- Christopher Alder (died 1998)
- Roger Sylvester (died 1999)
- Jean Charles De Menezes (died 2005)
- Sean Rigg (died 2008)
- Ian Tomlinson (died 2009)
- Jimmy Mubenga (died 2010)
- Sarah Reed (died 2016)

== Notable staff ==
- Zafar Ansari

== Inquest publications ==
- Deaths in mental health detention: An investigation framework fit for purpose?. Inquest Charitable Trust. 2015. Archived from the original on 27 August 2016.
- Stolen Lives and Missed opportunities: The deaths of young adults and children in prison. Inquest Charitable Trust. 2015. Archived from the original on 27 August 2016.
- Preventing the deaths of women in prison. Inquest Charitable Trust. 2013. Archived from the original on 27 August 2016.
- Fatally Flawed. Inquest Charitable Trust. 2013. Archived from the original on 27 August 2016.
- Learning from Death in Custody Inquests: A New Framework for Action and Accountability. Inquest Charitable Trust. 2012.
- The Inquest Handbook: A guide for bereaved families, their friends and advisors, 2011. Inquest Charitable Trust. ISBN 978-0-946858-25-5. Archived from the original on 27 August 2016.
- Dying on the Inside - Examining women's deaths in prison. Inquest Charitable Trust. 2008. ISBN 9780946858224. Archived from the original on 9 June 2016.
- Unlocking the Truth: Families' Experience of the Investigation of Deaths in Custody, 2007. Inquest Charitable Trust. 2007. ISBN 9780946858217. Archived from the original on 27 August 2016.
- In the Care of the State? – Child deaths in penal custody in England & Wales. Inquest Charitable Trust. 2006. ISBN 0946858195. Archived from the original on 6 April 2016.
- Prisoners: Deaths in Custody and the Human Rights Act. Inquest Charitable Trust. 2000. ISBN 0946858101.
- Death & Disorder - Three case studies of public order and policing in London. Inquest Charitable Trust. 1986. Archived from the original on 27 August 2016.

== See also ==
- UK deaths in custody
