= Death of Christopher Alder =

1998 unlawful killing by police officers

- Christopher Ibikunle Alder
- Date: 1 April 1998 (age 37)
- Location: Queen's Gardens Police Station, Kingston upon Hull
- Cause: Postural asphyxiation
- Accused: Police Sergeant John Dunn; Police Constable Matthew Barr; Police Constable Neil Blakey; Police Constable Nigel Dawson; Police Constable Mark Ellerington
- Charges: Manslaughter
- Verdict: Acquitted on the instructions of the judge to the jury

Christopher Alder (25 June 1960 – 1 April 1998) was a trainee computer programmer and former British Army paratrooper who had served in the Falklands War and was commended for his service with the Army in Northern Ireland. He died in police custody at Queen's Gardens Police Station, Kingston upon Hull, in April 1998. The case became a cause célèbre for civil rights campaigners in the United Kingdom. He had earlier been the victim of an assault outside a nightclub and was taken to Hull Royal Infirmary where, possibly as a result of his head injury, staff said his behaviour was "extremely troublesome." He was escorted from the hospital by two police officers who arrested him to prevent a breach of the peace.

On arrival at the police station Alder was "partially dragged and partially carried," handcuffed and unconscious, from a police van and placed on the floor of the custody suite. A conversation took place, during which custody sergeant, PS Dunn, initially told the escorting constables to take Alder to hospital. They pointed out that they had just come from hospital and that the hospital had discharged Alder. The officers speculated that Alder was faking illness, a view which PS Dunn accepted. Alder's handcuffs were removed before all the officers went behind the front counter of the custody suite. At this point, the officers were off camera, but the custody CCTV system continued to capture the audio of their conversation. The officers laughed and joked with one another, and there was a discussion about what Alder should be charged with. During one conversation, an officer can be heard making multiple rhythmic noises, which some subsequent examiners alleged were monkey noises, a form of racist abuse against black people. However, this interpretation has been disputed.

Twelve minutes later one of the officers present noticed that Alder was not making any breathing noises and although resuscitation was attempted, he was pronounced dead at the scene. A post mortem indicated that the head injury alone would not have killed him. The incident was captured on the police station's closed-circuit television (CCTV) cameras.

A coroner's jury in 2000 returned a verdict that Alder was unlawfully killed. In 2002, five police officers went on trial charged with Alder's manslaughter and misconduct in public office, but were acquitted on the orders of the judge. In 2006, an Independent Police Complaints Commission report concluded that four of the officers present in the custody suite when Alder died were guilty of the "most serious neglect of duty" and "unwitting racism". In November 2011 the government formally apologised to Alder's family in the European Court of Human Rights, admitting that it had breached its obligations with regard to "preserving life and ensuring no one is subjected to inhuman or degrading treatment". They also admitted that they had failed to carry out an effective and independent inquiry into the case.

== Christopher Alder ==
Christopher Ibikunle Alder was a black British man of Nigerian descent, born in Hull in 1960. He joined the British Army aged 16 and served in the Parachute Regiment for six years. After leaving the Army, he first settled in Andover, Hampshire, before relocating to Dagger Lane, Hull in 1990. In 1998 he was taking a college course in computer skills in Hull. He had two sons, who had remained with their mother in the Andover area when their parents separated.

== Events leading to death ==
=== The Waterfront Club ===
At around 7 pm on 31 March 1998, Alder went out for the evening in Hull with two friends, visiting several local bars and a fast food restaurant before Alder suggested going on to The Waterfront Club (later renamed The Sugar Mill), a nightclub on Prince's Dock Street in the Old Town area of the city. His companions, who testified that at this stage of the evening Alder had drunk only two pints of lager and two bottles of Beck's beer and "seemed sober", declined the invitation. Alder went on alone to the club at around 10.30 pm. While there he drank a further two or three pints of lager. At approximately 1.30 am Alder became involved in a disagreement with another customer, Jason Ramm, which led to Ramm being ejected from the club. Ramm waited in the vicinity of Prince's Dock Street until Alder left the club at 2.15 am and another confrontation occurred which was captured on the club's exterior CCTV. A third person, Jason Paul, attempted to break up the fight and was struck by Alder. Paul retaliated by punching Alder in the face, which caused him to fall backwards, strike his head on the pavement, and lose consciousness. Staff at the nightclub telephoned the emergency services and an ambulance took Alder – who had by this time regained consciousness – to the Hull Royal Infirmary.

Two police officers, PC Nigel Dawson and PC Neil Blakey, who had arrived shortly after the ambulance in a marked patrol car, made no attempt to speak to Alder. They consulted with the club manager, who took them inside to review the club's CCTV footage of the incident. A message they sent to their control room at this time indicates that they had already assumed Alder was very drunk, despite not having spoken to him or having been told this by any of the witnesses they spoke with. A third police officer, Acting Police Sergeant (A/PS) Mark Ellerington, arrived at about 2.50 am, after the ambulance left, and spoke with the club manager and the officers already present. He was told by Dawson and Blakey that Alder was drunk. The IPCC report criticised the police, saying: "This judgement, based upon very little evidence, tends to suggest that the two officers were making assumptions about Mr. Alder's behaviour, and choosing to attribute it to alcohol taken rather than the injury sustained, from an early stage in their dealings with him."

=== Hull Royal Infirmary ===
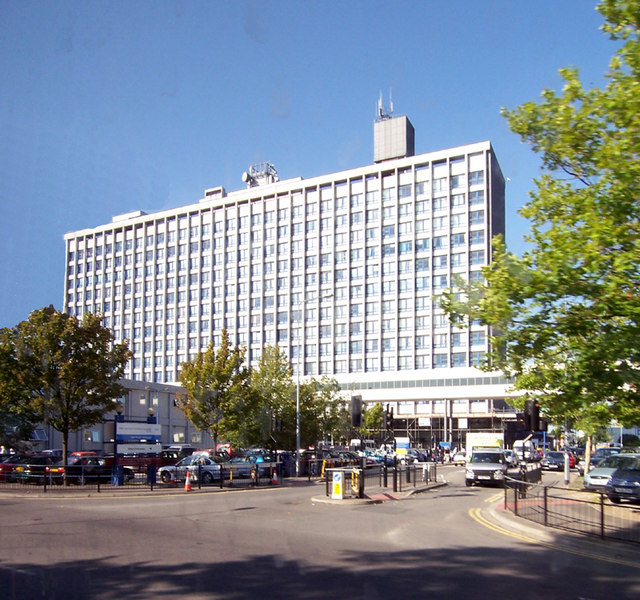
Hull Royal Infirmary.

The ambulance arrived at the hospital at 2.44 am, where Alder was described by one witness who dealt with him as "confused and dazed" and "generally abusive." One of the paramedics from the ambulance crew who had transported him there stated that Alder asked: "Where am I? What's happened?" A nurse who treated him stated that, in addition to being abusive and swearing at her, he was asking: "Where am I, what am I doing?" Two police officers present in the emergency department on an unrelated matter intervened and asked him to cooperate with the nursing staff. They recalled that he calmed down but remained "confused." PC Dawson and PC Blakey arrived at the hospital at approximately 3.05 am. Alder again became uncooperative, and the police control room were informed by the officers at 3.19 am: "Our complainant is being a wee bit troublesome. Probably the reason why he got smacked in the first place." The doctor who examined Alder listed his injuries as:

- haematoma at the rear of his head caused by impact but not consistent with a direct blow
- localised swelling to the area of the left side of his upper lip
- two wounds to the left side of his upper lip which were not bleeding
- front left canine tooth knocked out and the tooth adjacent to it upon the left upper side loosened and pushed into his mouth
- minimal bleeding from the tooth that was knocked out

Medical staff tried to take an x-ray of Alder's head injury but he would not remain still and they abandoned the effort. PC Dawson wrote in his note book at this time that Alder was "heavily in drink" and "typical of people I've seen in the past on amphetamine." Staff decided they could not treat Alder without his cooperation, and the police officers asked if he was well enough to be detained in police custody. The attending doctor agreed that he was. A 2005 Healthcare Commission report into the medical treatment Alder received described this decision as "flawed...[T]he doctor had yet to make a diagnosis. He was unable to carry out his plan of treatment for Christopher Alder, for example to admit him for observation, x-ray his skull and refer him to a maxillo-facial surgeon. Despite this he decided to discharge him without seeking advice from a senior colleague." This may have contributed to the police officers' assumption that Alder's condition was not serious. Alder was forcibly removed from the hospital by PCs Dawson and Blakey, with medical staff stating that he was dragged out by his arms, backwards and with his legs trailing on the floor. The police officers, however, stated that Alder had walked out unaided although they had kept a gentle grip on him to guide him and prevent him falling.

Once outside the hospital, the police officers told Alder to go home, but he argued with them, and he was arrested to prevent a breach of the peace. A/PS Ellerington drove to the hospital in a Mercedes-Benz Sprinter with a caged section in the rear to collect Alder for transport to the police station and detention. A witness recalled that, although handcuffed, Alder climbed into the back of the van unassisted.

=== Queen's Gardens Police Station ===
External videos
- Christopher Alder CCTV footage. CCTV footage from the police station custody suite provided by the Bureau of Investigative Journalism (4 mins 18 secs).

Following a journey of approximately six minutes the van doors were opened at the police station. The police described Alder as "asleep" and "snoring." He was dragged from the van and into the custody suite at 3.46 am by PCs Dawson and Blakey, "unresponsive" and with his hands handcuffed behind his back, his legs and feet dragging along the floor and his face just above the ground. His trousers and underpants had been pulled down to his knees, possibly by dragging on the floor surface, and one of his shoes had come off. A/PS Ellerington followed them in. Police Sergeant (PS) John Dunn and PC Matthew Barr were on duty in the custody suite as custody officer and cell warder respectively.

Dawson and Blakey left Alder lying face down on the floor, where the CCTV showed a pool of blood forming around his mouth. One of the officers commented on the blood, but no attempt was made to examine Alder. PS Dunn was heard on the CCTV footage saying Alder should be taken to the hospital, to which Dawson and Blakey reply that they had just come from there and that they believe Alder is feigning unconsciousness. Dawson said: "This is acting now" and "This is just an acting thing," while Blakey said: "He's right as rain... This is a show, this" and "He kept doing dying swan acts falling off the [hospital] trolley." A/PS Ellerington stated later that he believed Alder was "feigning deep sleep." PS Dunn stated that he: "formed the opinion, from what I was told, that the man's behaviour at the present time may be play-acting or attention seeking."

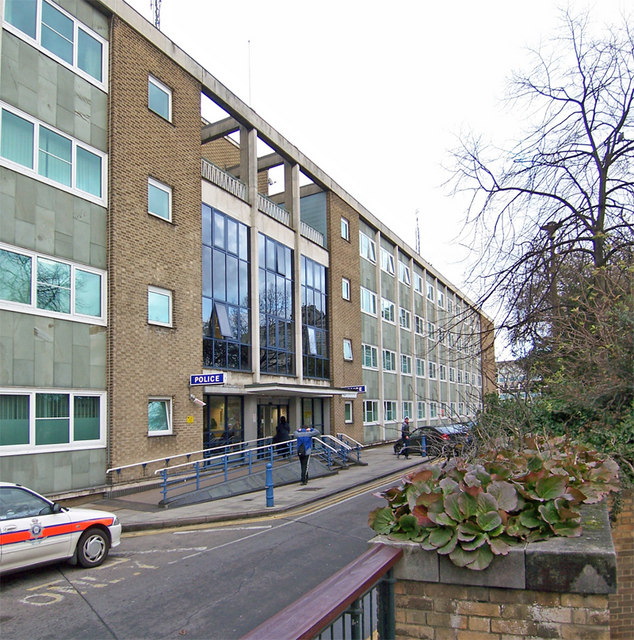
Queen's Gardens Police Station, Hull.

After a few minutes the handcuffs were removed; Alder's arms remained unmoving behind his back, and no attempt was made to examine or rouse him. The officers moved to the opposite side of the counter while a discussion took place about what offences he should be charged with and whether there was any possible justification for holding him, as any potential for breach of peace had clearly passed. Alder could be heard making "gurgling" noises as he breathed in and out through the pool of blood around his face. PS Dunn later explained that although he was aware of the gurgling he ignored it, believing Alder was deliberately blowing through the blood to "try and upset" the officers. PC Barr stated later that he had believed the noises "were intended for our attention, in other words he was putting it on, which fitted neatly into what we had been told by PC Dawson."

The audio track of the CCTV footage appears to show that the officers made monkey noises, a common form of racist abuse against black people. At 3.57 am PC Barr pointed out that Alder was not making any noise and PS Dunn walked around the counter to check him. The officers began resuscitation attempts and called for an ambulance at 3.59 am. It arrived at 4.04 am, operated by the same crew which had earlier transported Alder from The Waterfront Club to the Hull Royal Infirmary.

Although the crew had been informed that the casualty had "breathing difficulty," the only equipment that they took into the custody suite was a bag valve mask. The paramedic admitted that when they had received the call out, he had told his colleague "that it would probably be someone trying to pull a sickie [ie feigning illness] to get out of appearing in court in the morning." He had to return to the ambulance outside to collect the necessary equipment, not returning until another minute had elapsed. The ambulance technician who first examined Alder reported him as having fixed, dilated pupils, no pulse and not breathing. They eventually ceased CPR at 4.35 am.

Alder's clothes were destroyed by a West Yorkshire Police team investigating the death and never subjected to forensic examination.

== Inquest into death ==
At an inquest held in 2000, the jury returned a verdict of unlawful killing. The five police officers who were present in the custody suite at the time were called to give evidence at the inquest, but on more than 150 occasions during the hearing refused to answer questions, citing Coroners Rules that the response could provide self-incriminating evidence. They were subsequently charged with misconduct in public office. Shortly after the verdict was returned the officers, backed by the Police Federation, sought to overturn it by means of a judicial review. They claimed that the coroner should not have given a verdict of unlawful killing as an option to the jury, as the breaches of duty alleged against them could not amount to gross negligence. They also alleged that a female juror had been "infatuated" with the prosecuting barrister and that there was a "real possibility that her infatuation converted into bias." The application for the judicial review was dismissed by the High Court of Justice in April 2001.

== Trial of police officers ==
The Crown Prosecution Service initially decided that there was insufficient evidence to pursue criminal charges against the officers but, following a review of the medical evidence, the officers were charged in March 2002 with manslaughter. The trial collapsed in June 2002 when the judge ordered the jury to find the officers not guilty on all charges. Following the acquittal, an internal police disciplinary inquiry cleared the officers of any wrongdoing.

In July 2003 the Attorney General Lord Goldsmith challenged the legal correctness of the officers' acquittals and sent the ruling to the Court of Appeal "to clarify the threshold for evidence in future death-in-custody cases", although this would not affect the acquittal because of the principle of double jeopardy that applied at that time. In April 2004, BBC television series Rough Justice broadcast "Death On Camera", a programme examining the circumstances of Alder's death, including the CCTV footage from the custody suite which had previously not been seen by the public. As a result of the programme and the public concern it raised, Home Secretary David Blunkett asked the Independent Police Complaints Commission (IPCC) to review the case. In December 2004 four of the five police officers were granted early retirement on stress-related medical grounds and received lump-sum compensation payments of between £44,000 and £66,000 as well as pensions. The officers all declined requests to take part in the IPCC inquiry. In March 2006 the IPCC chairman, Nick Hardwick, said the officers present when Alder died were guilty of the "most serious neglect of duty" amounting to "unwitting racism."

In September 2006 Leon Wilson, one of Alder's sons, went to the High Court to challenge the Home Office's refusal to reopen the case. The judge rejected his case, saying it was "legally reasonable for the Secretary of State to believe that no more worthwhile evidence was likely to emerge."

== Civil case arising from investigation ==
In January 2006, a civil jury found that a man had been unlawfully arrested and charged with assaulting Alder on the night he died "to divert attention away from the part the police themselves played in Mr Alder's death."

== Burial ==
In November 2011 Alder's body was discovered in the mortuary at Hull Royal Infirmary, eleven years after his family believed they had buried him. An exhumation of his grave in Hull's Northern Cemetery during the night of 21 February 2012 found that Grace Kamara, a 77-year-old woman, had been buried in his place. South Yorkshire Police Detective Superintendent Richard Fewkes announced that a criminal investigation had begun to determine if an offence of misconduct in public office had been committed. On 3 October 2013 the Crown Prosecution Service said there was insufficient evidence for a prosecution for either misconduct in a public office, or the prevention of the lawful burial of a body.

== Deaths in police custody ==
Alder was one of 69 people who died in police custody in 1998. Between 1990 and 2011, 980 people died in police custody. Prosecutions were recommended against 13 officers based on "relatively strong evidence of misconduct or neglect". There was one conviction, relating to the death of Craig Boyd in March 2004. Boyd hanged himself in his cell at St Mary's Wharf police station, Derby. Custody suite warden PC David Stoll had been watching a film at the time; custody records were falsified to show visits by officers to the cells "that were not substantiated by video evidence." Stoll was found guilty of misconduct in public office and sentenced to six months' imprisonment suspended for one year.

In 1999, Judge Gerald Butler criticised the Crown Prosecution Service for failing to take action over a number of deaths in police custody. He made several recommendations to improve accountability and expressed "unease" over the current system. In a December 2010 report, the IPCC suggested that juries were "unwilling to convict police officers." The report, which covered deaths in custody in England and Wales between 1998 and 2010, concluded that in 16 cases restraint by officers was the direct cause of death, of which four were classed as "positional asphyxia." The majority of deaths were ruled as occurring due to natural causes, many involving drug or alcohol abuse, and the authors called on the Home Office and Department of Health "to pilot facilities with medical care to replace police cells." Deborah Coles, co-director of the charity and campaign group Inquest said: "The study points to alarming failures in the care of vulnerable detainees suffering from mental health, drug and alcohol problems, many of whom should have been diverted from police custody."

According to the report, "fewer than half of detainees booked into custody who should have been risk assessed were actually assessed," while "incidents where custody officers had not conducted proper checks, or thoroughly roused detainees to check their state, were prevalent." Custody officers and staff lacked basic first aid training. Mike Franklin, the IPCC commissioner, said: "What emerges most prominently from the report is the medical and mental health needs of a large number of people the police arrest," and questioned whether custody "is the best place for a large number of the people the police deal with."

On 1 September 2011, the Corporate Manslaughter and Corporate Homicide Act 2007 was extended to include all deaths in police custody suites, prison cells, mental health detention facilities and Young Offenders Institutions.

== Typical ==
Alder's story was related in the stage play Typical, written by Ryan Calais Cameron and produced by Nouveau Riche. The one-man show starred Richard Blackwood in the role of Alder.

== See also ==
- Death of Colin Roach
- Death of Olaseni Lewis
- Death of Oluwashijibomi Lapite
- Death of Roger Sylvester
- Death of Sean Rigg
- Death of Wayne Douglas
- Criminal black man stereotype
