= Death of Roger Sylvester =

Roger Sylvester
- Born: Roger Stephen R. J. Sylvester; 17 August 1968; Islington, London, England
- Died: 19 January 1999 (aged 30); Whittington Hospital, Islington, London, England
- Cause of death: Cardiac arrest, brain ischemia
- Occupation: Local government administration officer
- Parent(s): Rupert and Sheila Sylvester

Roger Stephen R. J. Sylvester (17 August 1968 – 19 January 1999) was a mentally ill man who died after being detained outside his home in Tottenham, London, by eight Metropolitan Police officers. It was reported that his neighbours had complained to police of a disturbance after Sylvester had started banging on his own front door, naked.

Police detained Sylvester under the Mental Health Act, then took him to St Ann's Hospital, Haringey, where he fell into a coma while being restrained on the floor of a padded room by six officers while being assessed by medical staff. He died at Whittington Hospital, Islington, eight days later without regaining consciousness.

In 2003, an inquest heard that Sylvester, who suffered from bipolar disorder, had died of serious brain damage and cardiac arrest, caused by difficulty breathing because of the position he was held in. A jury returned a verdict of unlawful killing in October 2003. The eight officers who had taken Sylvester into custody appealed to the High Court against what they called an "irrational" ruling, and the verdict was overturned in November 2004.

In 1999, forensic pathologist Freddy Patel was reprimanded by the General Medical Council (GMC) for releasing medical details about Roger Sylvester to reporters outside an inquest hearing, Patel told reporters that Sylvester was a crack cocaine user, something his family denied. Patel later performed the controversial police postmortem following the death of Ian Tomlinson in April 2009 which reportedly favoured the disproven police account. In 2012, Patel was struck off (banned from practising) by the General Medical Council who found that he was not only incompetent but also dishonest.

== See also ==
- UK deaths in custody
- Death of Christopher Alder
- Death of Colin Roach
- Death of Olaseni Lewis
- Death of Oluwashijibomi Lapite
- Death of Sean Rigg
- Death of Wayne Douglas
