= Police Complaints Board =

- Abbreviation: PCB
- Formation: June 1977
- Legal status: Former non-departmental public body
- Purpose: Complaints about the English and Welsh police forces
- Region served: England & Wales
- Parent organization: Home Office

The Police Complaints Board (PCB) was the British government organisation tasked with overseeing the system for handling complaints made against police forces in England and Wales from 1 June 1977 until it was replaced by the Police Complaints Authority on 29 April 1985.

Like its replacement, the Police Complaints Authority, its successor the Independent Police Complaints Commission, and the present Independent Office for Police Conduct, the Police Complaints Board was operationally independent of the British police.

== Creation ==
Until the creation of the PCB in June 1977, complaints against police officers were handled directly by the forces concerned, although the Home Secretary could refer a serious complaint to another police force for investigation under a mechanism set out in Section 49 of the Police Act 1964. The investigating force would forward a report to the Director of Public Prosecutions (DPP), who could decide to prosecute the offending policemen.

Following a series of scandals involving the Metropolitan Police in the mid-1970s, and criticism of a perceived lack of independence in the existing process, the Police Complaints Board was created by the Police (Complaints) Act 1976.

== Powers ==
The new board could scrutinise a report produced by an investigating force and satisfy itself that justice had been done, or instruct the chief constable of the force against whom the complaint had been made to take disciplinary proceedings against the offending police officers.

The PCB did not cover Northern Ireland, which was the responsibility of a separate body, the Police Complaints Board for Northern Ireland also set up under the Police Act 1976. Nor did it cover Scotland, which retained the mechanism set up by the Police (Scotland) Act 1967.

== Criticism and reform ==
The 1981 Brixton riots, and the Scarman report on it which investigated, amongst other things, allegations of racism against the police led to pressure to reform the PCB.

The result was that the board was abolished and replaced by the Police Complaints Authority in the Police and Criminal Evidence Act 1984. A significant change was that the PCA was given extra powers allowing it to supervise police investigations into complaints, which has been taken further in its successor, the Independent Police Complaints Commission which replaced it on 1 April 2004 and which has the ability to carry out its own independent investigations.
