= Death of Sean Rigg =

British man who died in police custody in 2008

Sean Nicholas Rigg
- Born: 11 February 1968; Birmingham, England
- Died: 21 August 2008 (aged 40); Brixton, London, England
- Cause of death: Cardiac arrest, partial positional asphyxia, ischaemia, and acute arrhythmia
- Body discovered: Brixton Police Station, South London
- Parent(s): Daniel and Marie Rigg

Sean Rigg was a 40-year-old black British musician and music producer who had paranoid schizophrenia. He died following a cardiac arrest on 21 August 2008 while in police custody at the entrance to Brixton police station, South London, England. The case became a cause célèbre for civil rights and justice campaigners in the United Kingdom, who called for "improvement and change on a national level" regarding deaths in police custody and the police treatment of suspects with mental health issues.

== Events leading to death ==
Following a deterioration in his mental health, Rigg—who lived in a hostel for people with a forensic mental health history—became uncooperative and aggressive. Five 999 calls were made over a three-hour period by the hostel staff requesting emergency police help. During the fifth call, operator Maurice Gluck insisted that Rigg was not a police priority, informed the caller to speak with her MP if she was unhappy, and terminated the call. Police eventually responded to calls from members of the public who observed Rigg's "strange behaviour" in the street.

Four police officers gave chase to Rigg, who was handcuffed and restrained in a prone, face down position as officers leant on him for eight minutes. Arrested for assaulting a police officer, public disorder and theft of a passport—which was actually his own—he was then placed face-down with his legs bent behind him in the caged rear section of a police van and transported to Brixton police station. During the journey "his mental and physical health deteriorated" and he was "extremely unwell and not fully conscious" when eventually taken out of the van. This followed a delay of ten minutes during which he was left handcuffed in a 'rear stack' position, unattended and unmonitored while the van sat outside the station in the car parking area. One of the arresting officers was captured on the station's CCTV claiming that Rigg was "faking it".

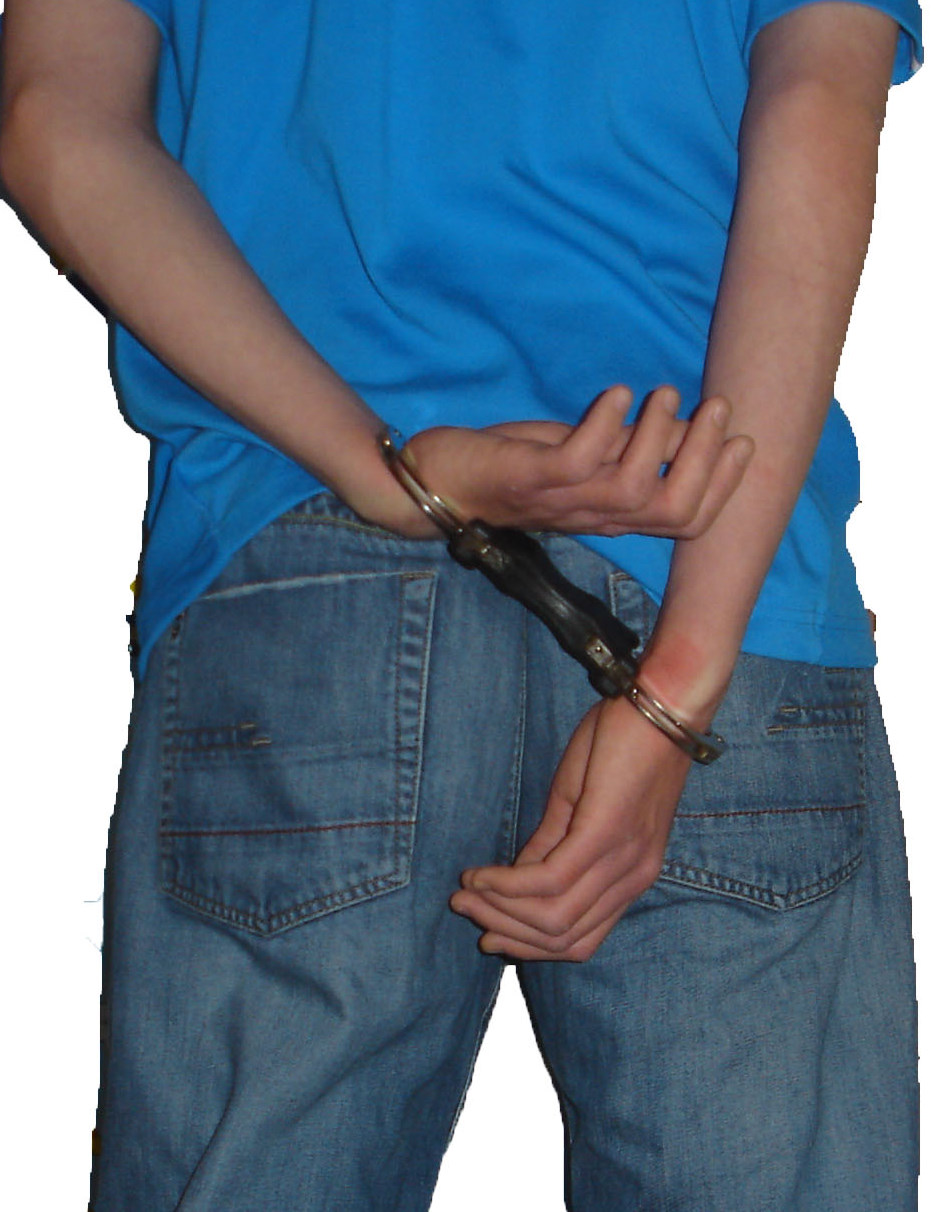
The 'rear stack' handcuff position used on Rigg.

Two officers then carried Rigg to the caged area at the entrance to the station's custody suite where he was left placed on the floor "handcuffed and unresponsive." After a further delay of 25 minutes Dr Nandasena Amarasekera, the Force Medical Examiner, was called to examine Rigg, although CCTV later showed that custody sergeant PS Paul White misled the doctor by telling him that Rigg was "feigning unconsciousness." When the FME examined him again ten minutes later he found that his heart had stopped and he was not breathing. Although CPR was attempted, Rigg was officially pronounced dead after arriving at King's College Hospital, Southwark.

== IPCC investigation ==
The Independent Police Complaints Commission (IPCC) launched an investigation into Rigg's death on 22 August 2008. The investigation took 18 months to complete and concluded that there was no evidence of neglect or wrongdoing and that the police had acted "reasonably and proportionately." The IPCC investigation was completed by February 2010 but publication of the report was delayed until the Coroner's Court proceedings were completed.

== Coroner's inquest ==
In August 2012, an inquest jury at Southwark Coroner's Court returned a narrative verdict which concluded that the police had used "unsuitable and unnecessary force" on Rigg, that officers failed to uphold his basic rights and that the failings of the police "more than minimally" contributed to his death. The inquest highlighted serious shortfalls in the IPCC's investigation, while South London and Maudsley NHS Foundation Trust was also criticised for failing to organise a mental health assessment for Rigg and failing to ensure that he took his medication.

=== Reactions ===
Daniel Machover, the solicitor acting on behalf of Rigg's brother Wayne, reacted: "Now that the IPPC has published its February 2010 report, the public can see for itself that the IPCC failed to properly examine the most basic evidence in its possession in Sean Rigg's case, including police incident records, photographs of the restraint and CCTV footage, which meant that officers were never asked key questions until the inquest. This helps to account for the gulf between the IPCC's ludicrous findings and the jury's damning narrative verdict: so, while the IPCC gave the police a clean bill of health in 2010, two weeks ago the inquest jury was highly critical of every aspect of the police conduct, including the eight minutes restraint in the prone position, a fact totally missed by the IPCC." Deborah Coles of the charity group Inquest, which campaigns on behalf of bereaved families with a particular focus on deaths in custody, said: "The IPCC investigation was fundamentally flawed from the outset and it is shameful that without the relentless and dogged determination of the family and their legal team, so many of these failures would never have been uncovered."

== Evidence given by police officers ==
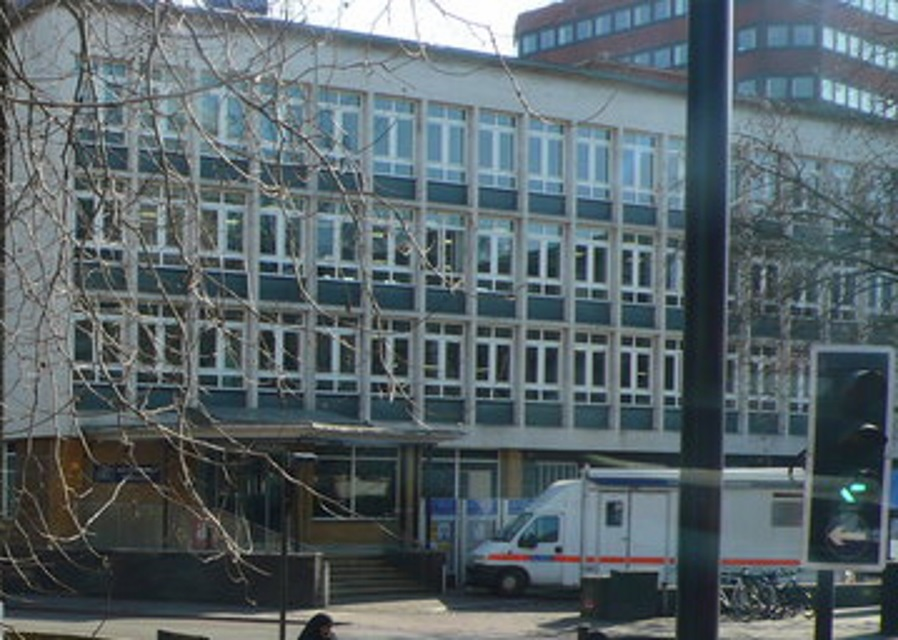
Brixton Police Station viewed from Brixton Road.

Following the inquest, the Metropolitan Police requested that the IPCC investigate the "honesty and integrity" of the evidence given to both the IPCC and the inquest by one of the officers.

=== Arrests ===
In March 2013 three Metropolitan Police officers were arrested on suspicion of perverting the course of justice with regard to evidence given at Rigg's inquest. In April 2014 the IPCC passed files to the Crown Prosecution Service (CPS) to consider whether criminal charges of perjury and perverting the course of justice should be brought against two of the officers, Sgt Paul White and PC Mark Harratt. White had given evidence at the inquest that he had checked on Rigg and carried out a risk assessment while he was detained in the police van, including his posture and his general demeanour, but CCTV evidence proved he had not visited the van at any time. Harratt had corroborated White's version of events. The third officer was cleared by the IPCC.

=== Decision not to prosecute ===
In October 2014 the CPS announced that there would be no criminal charges raised against the two officers. The CPS said that the prosecution "would have to prove the officers were lying and not simply mistaken" and that there was "insufficient evidence to prove a case against the officers for perjury or conspiracy to pervert the course of justice." They also said that "there is evidence to suggest that [White] has a medical condition which impacts on his memory, which is relevant given what the evidence suggests about the number of occasions on which he may have attended prisoners in the yard and the passage of time between the incident and the first interview." Marcia Rigg said: "My family is surprised and bitterly disappointed by today’s announcement. We categorically do not accept this decision, which only serves as further upset and anguish. We regard the evidence as compelling and strongly believe that a jury should have been given the opportunity to make a decision on the evidence. The public's confidence in the British criminal justice system is tarnished by decisions like this."

=== Victims' Right to Review and decision to prosecute ===
In July 2015 the CPS said that, following a request from Rigg's family under the Victims' Right to Review (VRR) policy, it had reviewed and overturned its previous decision and would now prosecute White. White was formally charged with perjury and bailed to appear at Westminster Magistrates' Court on 8 September 2015, but was not suspended from duties. Sue Hemming, the head of the CPS's special crime and counter-terrorism division, said: "After careful consideration of the evidence, I have decided that there is sufficient evidence to provide a realistic prospect of conviction and that it is in the public interest to charge Paul White with one count of perjury, which relates to the evidence he gave at Mr Rigg's inquest and therefore the original decision should be overturned. I also considered evidence against another police officer but agreed with the original decision not to prosecute due to insufficient evidence."

Following criticism of the decision to keep him on "restricted duties", White was suspended on 16 July 2015. Inquest released a statement saying: "It should be standard practice for a police officer charged with a criminal offence to be suspended. It should not be for a bereaved family to have to put pressure on the police to force them to do what is clearly in the public interest."

A jury at Southwark Crown Court unanimously acquitted Sgt White in November 2016. Rigg's sister Marcia said, "The jury's verdict was a surprise to me and my family but we will continue to fight for full accountability for those officers who were on duty at Brixton police station. That a custody sergeant can give false evidence in connection with a death in custody, something he accepts he did, is a shocking state of affairs."

== External review of IPCC investigation ==
External videos
- "Death in police custody: review announced". Channel 4 News report dated 17 May 2013, following the release of the independent review's report about the IPCC investigation.

In November 2012 it was announced that an independent review of the IPCC investigation would be carried out, headed by Silvia Casale, former president of both the European and United Nations committees for the prevention of torture and inhuman and degrading treatment of prisoners. The review, the first ever into an IPCC investigation, would also consider whether any of the police officers or emergency telephone operators should face misconduct or criminal proceedings.

The report was published on 17 May 2013. It concluded that the IPCC committed a series of major blunders and that there had been "inappropriate conduct" by the Police Federation of England and Wales. Failings included:

- Failure to secure the crime scene
- Failure to prevent officers from conferring with each other
- Failure to ensure they all gave statements
- Waiting six months to interview officers
- Failure to examine CCTV
- Failure to carry out robust analysis
- Too soft in challenging the officers' accounts.

The report also recommended that the IPCC "reconsider the conduct of the police officers involved in the apprehension, restraint and detention of Mr Rigg, in relation to possible breaches of their duty of care, with a view to determining whether to bring misconduct proceedings." Rigg's sister Marcia said: "Almost five years after our brother's unnecessary death, this report shows just how badly we were failed by the IPCC, not to mention the police. We hope that a complete reinvestigation of the issues identified by the review, with new consideration of police misconduct and criminal proceedings, will take place as quickly as possible."

== Independent Commission on Mental Health and Policing ==
As a result of Rigg's inquest verdict, the Independent Commission on Mental Health and Policing was established in September 2012 to examine the conduct of the Metropolitan Police when dealing with people with mental health issues. The commission reviewed 55 cases involving mentally ill people who died or were seriously injured in police custody or following police contact between September 2007 and September 2012. Five of the victims died following police restraint and 45 subsequently committed suicide. The review also included four cases of suicide by Metropolitan Police officers.

The commission, chaired by Lord Adebowale, highlighted a number of shortcomings in the performance of the police:

- The disproportionate use of force and restraint
- Discriminatory attitudes and behaviour
- The internal [police] culture
- Failure of the Central Communications Command to deal effectively with calls in relation to mental health
- The lack of mental health awareness among staff and officers
- Frontline police lack of training and policy guidance in suicide prevention
- Failure of procedures to provide adequate care to vulnerable people in custody
- Problems of interagency working
- Failures in operational learning
- A disconnect between policy and practice
- Poor record keeping
- Failure to communicate with families

== See also ==
- Death of Christopher Alder
- Death of Colin Roach
- Death of Olaseni Lewis
- Death of Oluwashijibomi Lapite
- Death of Roger Sylvester
- Death of Wayne Douglas
- List of killings by police in the United Kingdom
