= Killing of Alton Manning =

1995 killing of a black man in the United Kingdom

On 8 December 1995, Alton Manning, a 33-year-old black man, was killed whilst being processed at HMP Blakenhurst in Worcestershire, England. An inquest in March 1998 found that the killing was unlawful. The Crown Prosecution Service refused to bring charges against any officers; consequently, no officers have been charged in the killing.

== Death ==
Prison guards selected Manning for a strip search, which he obeyed. He was then ordered to squat for an anal and genital examination, which he refused to do. A struggle then ensued, where Manning was thrown to the ground face down, whilst other prison officers held down his hands and legs. He was carried half-naked along a corridor and held in a neck hold. Officers then noticed a pool of blood near his head, and his body became limp. They then called for medical assistance, while they continued to restrain him. When the nurse arrived he was found to be dead, and attempts to resuscitate him failed.

== Investigation and prosecution ==
A postmortem found that Manning died of asphyxia. He reportedly had "blood from the ear and mouth, bruising to the neck and back, blood spots in the eyes, face and neck, and eight separate injuries to the face". It was also found that none of the officers had sustained any injuries, though they claimed that Manning resisted violently.

The Crown Prosecution Service refused to bring criminal charges against the officers, stating that there was "insufficient evidence to proceed". An inquest into the death was conducted, which concluded on 25 March 1998 and found that the killing was unlawful. The court added that "Alton Manning died a brutal, inhuman [and] violent death as a direct result of a neckhold unlawfully applied by a senior prison officer at HMP Blakenhurst". The inquest recommended that the CPS consider bringing charges against the involved officers. Following the result of the inquest, seven prison officers were suspended, though no charges were brought forward against the individuals.

Manning's family sought judicial review against the decision of the Director of Public Prosecutions, David Calvert-Smith, to not bring charges against the officers involved. The request for judicial review was successful; in May 2000 Lord Bingham, the Lord Chief Justice, stated that the decision to not bring manslaughter charges was flawed and must be reconsidered. Bingham added that the expectation would be, after a finding of unlawful killing, a prosecution to follow. Following a review in 2002, a CPS spokesperson said that "after careful consideration" they decided that "there is insufficient evidence" to bring forth criminal charges against anyone involved. Consequently, no officers have been charged in the killing.

== Reaction ==
Following the death, Richard Tilt, the Director General of Her Majesty's Prison Service, commented that black people were more likely than white people to suffer "positional asphyxia" while being restrained by prison officers, due to "physiological differences". Following public backlash and comments from medical experts who stated no evidence supported the claim, Tilt apologised for his comments.
