= United Friends and Families Campaign =

United Friends and Families Campaign (UFFC) is a London-based coalition of campaigns by the friends and the families of people who have died in police custody, prisons and psychiatric hospitals. The aim of the coalition is to prevent such deaths from occurring.

The coalition supports the families to organise demonstrations, speak to the media, hold regular vigils outside police stations, demand inclusion in a policy conference about deaths in custody, and entreat the judicial system to respond to evidence of police brutality. The UFFC calls, among other things, for the investigation of deaths in police custody by a body that is "genuinely independent of the police", for automatic prosecution of officers following verdicts of unlawful killing and for CCTV to be placed in the back of all police vans.

In 1999, the group held the first Annual Remembrance Procession from Trafalgar Square to Downing Street, where a rally is held every year to demand policy changes and additional investigations.

In July 2001, Migrant Media, made the film about 'Injustice' about deaths in police custody between 1969 and 1999, as a tribute to the organisation.

They supported the No shoot to kill campaign in 2005 after Jean Charles de Menezes was shot and killed by SO19 under the Metropolitan Police's shoot to kill policy.

The organisation Inquest has documented key events in the history of UFFC. In response to US mobilisations as part of the global movement for Black Lives, UK activists have organised protests with the slogan 'The UK is not innocent'.
