= Police Complaints Authority (United Kingdom) =

The Police Complaints Authority (PCA) was an independent body in the United Kingdom with the power to investigate public complaints against the Police in England and Wales as well as related matters of public concern. It was formed in 1985, replacing the Police Complaints Board and was then itself replaced by the Independent Police Complaints Commission (IPCC) in April 2004.

The IPCC was also, in Northern Ireland, the successor body to Office of the Police Ombudsman for Northern Ireland, set up in 2000 to investigate complaints against the Royal Ulster Constabulary and its successor the Police Service of Northern Ireland (PSNI). It had its own teams of civilian investigators and was completely independent of the Police. In addition to the PSNI it also covered the Belfast Harbour Police and the Larne Harbour Police, the Belfast International Airport Constabulary, and the MoD Police (not the same as the Royal Military Police). Unlike the IPCC the Ombudsman's office could investigate an incident without a referral or complaint.

== Investigations ==
The PCA asked the West Yorkshire Police to investigate the activities of the West Midlands Serious Crime Squad in 1989. It reported in 1994.

== See also ==
- Police Complaints Authority (New Zealand)
