= Daniel Machover =

British lawyer

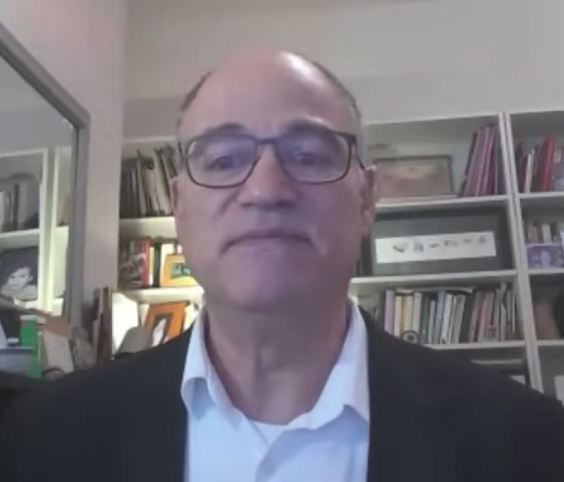
- In a SOAS video in 2025
- Occupation: Solicitor

Daniel Machover is the head of civil litigation for Hickman & Rose Solicitors in London, UK and was the co-founder of Lawyers for Palestinian Human Rights in 1988.

== Early life ==
According to an interview in The Independent, "Close observations of his parents' treatment at the hands of the Israeli authorities – including the strip-searching of his mother – heightened Machover's awareness of the potential for those in uniform to abuse their powers". His father, Professor Moshé Machover, was one of the founders of the Israeli socialist group Matzpen, and Daniel refers to his parents as "anti-Zionist Israelis".

== Career ==
Machover's work with prisoners alleging brutality at Wormwood Scrubs Prison in London led to an official Prison Service report, which found that "more than 160 prison officers were involved in inflicting and covering up a regime of torture which saw savage beatings, death threats and sexual assault inflicted on inmates".

Machover represents the Palestinian Centre for Human Rights and was involved in obtaining a warrant on behalf of Palestinians to arrest Israeli General Doron Almog on a visit to London for alleged war crimes, but was never acted upon by British police.

Machover was also involved in obtaining a warrant from a British court to arrest Tzipi Livni, the foreign minister of Israel, when she visited London. This action failed as Livni received a warning that she would be arrested if she entered Britain.

Machover is Chair of the Trustees of the charity Inquest, which works in the field of deaths in custody and detention in England and Wales.
