= Death of Leon Patterson =

British death in police custody

Leon Patterson (23 December 1960 – 27 November 1992) was a 31-year-old man of mixed race who lived in north London and who died in police custody in Manchester, England.

== Arrest ==
On 21 November 1992, Patterson was arrested on suspicion of theft from a BHS department store and was taken to Stockport police station by officers from Greater Manchester Police. On arrival he told police he was a heroin user and complained of feeling unwell and suffering withdrawal symptoms, which included vomiting, nausea and diarrhea. The police fed his name into the Police National Computer that told them, incorrectly, that he was an escapee. He had in fact failed to return to prison from home leave but this false information affected police perception of him and they are believed to have suspected that his “symptoms” were at least in part a strategy to aid in his escape, and one of the three police doctors who saw him even wrote this conclusion on his custody record. The first police doctor who saw him treated his nausea and vomiting with Stemetil, a drug that the manufacturer says can cause neuroleptic malignant syndrome, a rare but potentially fatal condition.

== Court appearance ==
Patterson was due to attend court on 26 November by which time his condition had worsened. At 5.00 a.m. he was found in his cell naked and collapsed and apparently unconscious. A police doctor was called and found him conscious but mumbling incoherently. This doctor was unable to make a proper examination but nevertheless deemed Patterson fit to be detained. By 8.30 a.m., despite the fact that his condition had not improved, the police made a decision that he should attend court and he was placed, still naked and with his hands handcuffed behind his back, on the floor of a police van in which he was taken to court. He was placed face down and naked on the floor of a cell at the court. His solicitor requested that Leon be taken to the local hospital but this request was ignored. Police did make attempts to get Leon admitted to the hospital at Strangeways prison but these were unsuccessful. A decision was made that he was not fit to attend the court and he was again placed naked and handcuffed on the floor of the police van and was taken to Denton police station five miles away.

== Death ==
A doctor was called on arrival at Denton and he arrived at the police station three hours later. He spent three or four minutes with the accused but was unable to complete his examination because he found his patient “un-cooperative”. He left Patterson lying naked on a cold stone floor and recommended that he be taken to Strangeways Prison Hospital. When he learned later that evening that this would not be possible he neither visited nor made any recommendation that Patterson be taken to some other hospital. At the inquest this doctor confirmed that he had failed to notice over thirty wounds to Patterson’s body (he saw wounds only to the face and head) that twelve other witnesses testified they had seen that day. The Coroner confessed himself “amazed” that a police doctor called to see a man who had spent the day lying naked on a concrete floor moaning and incoherent left him to remain in that condition without even suggesting that he be covered with a blanket or given a mattress. During the rest of the day his condition deteriorated and he suffered incontinence but was left by the police naked and injured on a bare stone floor lying in his own feces. Later that evening he was found dead in his cell. After six days in custody it was only after death that he was finally given a mattress and a blanket.

== Inquest ==
There have been three inquests into the death of Leon Patterson. The first inquest was adjourned and there have been two different explanations for this. The first explanation is “problems with a juror”. The second explanation is that the coroner was sacked because of some remarks he made to Patterson’s twin sister, Stephanie Lightfoot-Bennet, who was representing the family at the inquest. It is of course possible that both of these explanations are true.

The second inquest in April 1993 resulted in a verdict of unlawful killing but on appeal by the police this verdict was quashed by the High Court and a third inquest in October 1994 returned a verdict of “misadventure contributed to by neglect”.

The cause of Patterson’s death has not been ascertained with any certainty. At postmortem examination it was found that part of his nose was missing, that he had severe bruising to his testicles and a total of 32 injuries covering his body. The family pathologist supported by an expert in drug withdrawal thought that Stemetil causing neuroleptic malignant syndrome was the most likely cause of death. The Home Office pathologist initially subscribed to the view that he had died from an overdose of nitrazepam, supported by evidence from a Manchester toxicologist. The Home Office pathologist presented this as his opinion both at the second inquest and in a report prepared for the Police Complaints Authority. The Manchester toxicologist then admitted that he had fabricated the data that led to this conclusion and at the third inquest, presenting his evidence as the last witness, the Home Office Pathologist presented a radically different opinion, that Patterson had died as a result of a complex metabolic disorder “resulting from drug withdrawal symptoms, dehydration and gastro-enteritis”. He said he formed this opinion at the original postmortem but failed to write it down.

== Aftermath ==
Despite being visited by two different police doctors during the last twenty hours of his life neither doctor prescribed any medication nor offered any treatment nor took any steps to get him to a civilian hospital. Similarly, the police took no steps to get him to hospital once they were aware that the facility at Strangeways was not available. At inquest the police doctor accepted that it was inhuman to have transported him to and from court in the manner in which they did and in his condition and that he (the doctor) should have instructed the police that Patterson was not fit to go to court. The same doctor also accepted that it was negligent of police officers and the second police doctor to allow him to remain in such a critical condition. Eminent medical experts who gave evidence at inquest expressed profound disquiet over the fact that Patterson should ever have remained in police custody when he clearly needed to be in hospital, though none have so far asked why he needed to go to hospital in the first place.

No one has ever been charged with any offence in relation to the death of Leon Patterson. His family continue to campaign for justice.
