= Sarah Reed (prisoner) =

British person, died in Holloway prison (1984–2016)

Sarah Lynne Reed (22 June 1984 – 11 January 2016) was a British prisoner waiting for psychiatric reports before a possible trial. A woman with a history of mental health problems, and a victim of police brutality a few years earlier, Reed died while on remand in Holloway prison. It was later found that the denial of medical treatment had led to her death, and that she would not have been able to plead.

== Personal history ==
A mixed-race black woman, Reed's mental health problems began in 2003 after the sudden death of her baby daughter. Along with the baby's father, she was given the wrapped remains to take to the undertakers in a taxi. In 2012, Reed was the victim of a severe attack from a white police officer PC James Kiddie, and suffered two broken ribs. She was later convicted for the shoplifting offence. Kiddie was prosecuted, and convicted of common assault in 2014. He was dismissed from the Metropolitan Police. The officer had two previous confirmed complaints lodged against him, the second for discriminatory comments made in 2011.

While in the psychiatric Maudsley Hospital in 2014, Reed told her family that she was sexually assaulted by an elderly male patient; some reports say this was a case of attempted rape. After reportedly acting in self-defence, she was charged with GBH with intent and held in Holloway prison on remand from October 2015 for psychiatric assessment to determine whether she was able to plead at trial. The report had not been written by the time of her death in January 2016, nor had a letter been sent to ensure her transfer to a more appropriate secure psychiatric facility. Her anti-psychotic drugs were reduced out of other health fears, but nothing was substituted; her health worsened. The staff's monitoring of Reed was reduced from twice to once an hour when she was moved to a different unit; although it was known she had self-harmed in the past, Reed was considered at low-risk.

On 11 January 2016, in Holloway prison's medical wing, Reed was found to be unresponsive on her prison bed with strips of linen around her neck. The Ministry of Justice said that CPR was attempted, but she was pronounced dead shortly after she was found. She suffered from bulimia, paranoid schizophrenia, and engaged in alcohol and substance abuse. A vigil was held outside Holloway prison in February 2016 on the day of her funeral.

== Inquest and related issues ==
The inquest verdict was that Reed had killed herself by self-strangulation. The jury decided she had died when her mind was unsound, but was unable to determine whether her death was intentional. Unacceptable delays in medical care contributed to her death.

Holloway prison was closed in May 2016 after being considered inadequate; an official decision which was endorsed by the prison inspectorate whose October 2016 report had criticised the prison's slow transfer of women with mental health issues to secure hospitals. Reed was the last woman to die in Holloway prison; reports of the racist treatment of prisoners dated back to the 1980s. Frances Crook, the chief executive of the Howard League for Penal Reform, in an article for The Guardian about this case, said the custodial remand of women in the United Kingdom is "scandalously high"; 70% of the women so held do not receive a custodial sentence after their trial.

== See also ==
- Death in custody
- Human rights
- Mental health inequality
- Mental health law
- Patients' rights
- Police misconduct
- Prisoners' rights
- Psychiatric survivors movement
