= Criticism of G4S =

British security company controversies

G4S describes itself as "the world's leading provider of security solutions" and provides security services for over 40 embassies around the world, works as stewards at football stadiums and runs over six British prisons, operates prisoner tagging schemes, assists within the Government Communications Headquarters (GCHQ) in the United Kingdom, and provides administrative roles to the health and education sectors. The company operates as a subsidiary of an American security services provider Allied Universal since April 2021.

G4S's controversies became known to the wider public following their handling of security for the 2012 Summer Olympics, but controversy extends to the 1990s, before the company was founded in its present form by the merger of Group 4 with Securicor. However, the corporation insists that the level of substantiated complaints has been extremely low and they are of a minor nature.

== Detention centres ==
The company received over 700 complaints from illegal immigrants held in G4S detention centres in the UK in 2010, including allegations of assault and racism. Three accounts of assault and two accounts of racial discrimination were upheld in relation to the company, although the majority of complaints against the company related to loss of property and lack of communication. Following release of an extremely critical report regarding a G4S-operated jail, the Labour party's shadow justice secretary said they would be inclined to take control of for-profit prisons if the industry competitors had not met deadlines imposed upon them. The response of Sadiq Khan, then Shadow Lord Chancellor and Shadow Justice Secretary, stressed the need for better contracting, to include liquidated damages provisions. The chief inspector of prisons, Nick Hardwick, recommended the crafting of a takeover contingency plan. "It's not delivering what the public should expect of the millions being paid to G4S to run it." Khan said, "I see no difference whether the underperformance is in the public, private or voluntary sector ... We shouldn't tolerate mediocrity in the running of our prisons." Khan continued: "We can't go on with scandal after scandal, where the public's money is being squandered and the quality of what's delivered isn't up to scratch. The government is too reliant on a cosy group of big companies. The public are rightly getting fed up to the back teeth of big companies making huge profits out of the taxpayer, which smacks to them of rewards for failure." Violence has increased at Rainsbrook Secure Training Centre and the private firm running it has no plans to improve stability.

In September 2017, G4S suspended nine members of staff from an immigration removal centre near Gatwick Airport, following a BBC Panorama undercover investigation. The programme reported to have covert footage recorded at the centre showing officers "mocking, abusing and assaulting" people being held there.

== 2012 Olympics security preparations ==
G4S's conduct during the London 2012 Olympic Games was described as "totally chaotic" and "an utter farce" by former police officers, especially their recruitment campaign. Key issues cited were a lack of organisation, with many guards unaware of where they were supposed to be for the Olympic Games.

G4S received a £284m contract to provide 13,700 guards for the Olympic Games, but amid concerns that there were staff shortages, the West Midlands Police Federation reported that its officers were being prepared to guard the Ricoh Arena in Coventry. Upon the deployment of 3,500 extra armed troops to guard Olympic venues, Home Secretary Theresa May denied that the organisation of the games amounted to a "shambles".

== Israel and Palestine ==
G4S supplied security equipment, services and maintenance for use at Israeli prisons, checkpoints and settlements in the West Bank, including across the highly controversial Israeli West Bank barrier. In 2007, the Israeli subsidiary of G4S signed a contract with the Israeli Prison Authority to provide security systems for major Israeli prisons. In April 2012, G4S released a statement detailing its activities in Israel – the provision of maintenance for some electronic security systems at a prison, a police station and a small number of checkpoints in the West Bank. In June 2014, Desmond Tutu and others protested at G4S's involvement with Israeli prisons. They also penned an open letter to the security firm, calling for it to "end its complicity in Israel's abuse of child prisoners". A report prepared by Hugo Slim, a research fellow at University of Oxford, and commissioned by G4S stated that the company "had no causal or contributory role in human rights violations" and "there are clearly human rights failings in some parts of Israel's security system, but G4S's role is far removed from their immediate causes and impact."

In 2015 G4S was targeted by the BDS movement in a campaign asking the United Nations to drop its contracts with the firm, and a number of trade unions have joined the boycott. In March 2016, the company revoked its contract with Israel, with G4S chief executive Ashley Almanza saying that the company expected to exit a number of businesses "in the next 12 to 24 months ... including G4S Israel". This was claimed by the national committee of the Palestine-based BDS group as a result of an international campaign against Israel, with Mahmoud Nawajaa (a representative of the group) saying:

As the height of the international boycott of apartheid South Africa, BDS pressure is making some of the world's largest corporations realise that profiting from Israeli Apartheid and colonialism is bad for business. Investment fund managers are increasingly recognising that their fiduciary responsibility obliges them to divest from Israeli banks and companies that are implicated in Israel's serious human rights violations, such as G4S and HP, because of the high risk entailed. We are starting to notice a domino effect.

== Wackenhut subsidiary ==
G4S subsidiary Wackenhut, in September 2005, faced allegations of security lapses at seven military bases where it was contracted to provide services. The company claimed the accusations were false and promoted by a union seeking to enroll its employees.

In March 2006, whistle-blowers employed at Wackenhut released information to the press revealing that the company cheated on an anti-terrorism drill at a US nuclear site. It also performed poorly on another drill at a separate location. The allegations claimed that Wackenhut systematically violated weapons inventory and handling policies and that managers showed new hires spots at the facilities where they could take naps and cut corners during patrols.

In July 2007, US Senator Bob Casey urged Interior Secretary Dirk Kempthorne to re-examine federal plans involving Wackenhut and its operations at US nuclear facilities, public transit systems and the Liberty Bell in Philadelphia. The Senator said the company was responsible for short-changing its employees.

In winter 2008, The New York Times reported that the Exelon Corporation would replace Wackenhut as an in-house security provider at ten US nuclear power plants. This followed the discovery of guards sleeping while on the clock.

On 24 January 2012, the Knoxville News Sentinel reported that a Wackenhut security guard slept while on the job at the Oak Ridge National Laboratory and had also used an unauthorised mobile telephone while inside the high-security facility. Photographs of the incidents were distributed to the publication, as well as the lab, Wackenhut and the US Department of Energy, which oversees the plant's operations. The facility houses approximately half a ton of uranium-233, enough for nearly 250 improvised nuclear detonations. On 28 July 2012 the US Department of Energy's Y-12 National Security Complex, protected by a US subsidiary of G4S, was breached by three protesters, identified as Megan Rice, 82, Michael Walli, 63, and Greg Boertje-Obed, 57, who got as far as the outer wall of the uranium building and allegedly daubed it with slogans and splashed it with human blood. The three form the anti-nuclear weapons activist group Transform Now Plowshares, a part of the Plowshares Movement. Operations at the site were suspended following the breach after performance tests were conducted on the Wackenhut Services Inc. Oak Ridge guard force. During the tests, a federal inspector discovered copies of questions and answers for the test inside a guard force vehicle, resulting in the administrative reassignment of the new security director.

In 2012, the Kansas City Star reported that three protestors were found in a secure area at the Y-12 National Security Complex.

In 2013, G4S announced its intention to divest its US Government services business, citing difficulties faced by non-US business in accessing appropriate data.

== Unacceptable use of force by UK Border Agency ==
In October 2010, three G4S guards restrained and held down 46-year-old Angolan deportee Jimmy Mubenga on departing British Airways flight 77, at Heathrow Airport. Security guards kept him restrained in his seat as he began shouting and seeking to resist his deportation. Later, the guards were accused of forcing Mubenga's head down as he sat, handcuffed from behind, for 36 minutes. The restraint technique said to be used is known as 'carpet karaoke' and is known to create a risk of asphyxia. Police and paramedics were called when Mubenga lost consciousness. The aircraft, which had been due to lift off, then returned to the terminal. Mubenga was pronounced dead later that evening at Hillingdon hospital. Passengers reported hearing cries of "I can't breathe", "don't do this" and "they are trying to kill me". Scotland Yard's homicide unit began an investigation after the death became categorised as "unexplained". Three private security guards, contracted to escort deportees for the Home Office, were released on bail, after having been interviewed about the incident.

In February 2011, The Guardian reported that G4S guards in the United Kingdom had been repeatedly warned about the use of potentially lethal force on detainees and asylum seekers. Confidential informants and several employees released the information to reporters after G4S's practices allegedly led to the death of Jimmy Mubenga. An internal document urged management to "meet this problem head on before the worst happens" and that G4S was "playing Russian roulette with detainees' lives." The following autumn, prison inspectors released a report that condemned G4S guards for mistreatment of detainees. On deportation flights the inspectors witnessed G4S guards verbally harassing and intimidating detainees with offensive and racist language and using inappropriate restraint.

In July 2012, the Crown Prosecution Service (CPS) announced its conclusion that there was "insufficient evidence to bring any charges for Mr Mubenga's death" against G4S or any of its former employees. On 9 July 2013 an inquest jury, in a nine-to-one decision, found that Mubenga's death was caused by the G4S guards "using unreasonable force", that one or more of the guards had pushed or held him down "in an unlawful manner" and that the guards "would have known that they would have caused Mr Mubenga harm in their actions, if not serious harm". The CPS subsequently announced that it was reconsidering its decision not to bring criminal charges and in November 2014 the trial of three G4S guards on charges of manslaughter began. Colin Kaler, 51, from Bedfordshire, Terrence Hughes, 53, from Hampshire, and Stuart Tribelnig, 38, from Surrey all denied the charges against them.

In October 2012 the Chief Inspector of Prisons, Nick Hardwick published his inspection report into the G4S managed Cedars Pre-Departure Accommodation UK Border Agency (UKBA). Whilst the majority of the report praised G4S and those working at the centre, noting that "Cedars is an exceptional facility and has many practices which should be replicated in other areas of detention", G4S were criticised for using "non-approved techniques" during one particular incident in which a pregnant woman's wheelchair was tipped up whilst her feet were held. The incident used "non-approved techniques" causing significant risk to the baby and was a "simply not acceptable" use of force. In response, G4S said its staff were trying to prevent injury and that the report also praised the staff for an "exceptional level of care."

In an unprecedented move, part of the seating within a Boeing 777 aircraft was constructed inside the Old Bailey courtroom to demonstrate to the jury the circumstances in which the death occurred. On 17 November 2014, the jurors were offered the chance to recreate the conditions experienced by Mubenga during his time on board the aeroplane. Six participated, taking turns to be restrained in exactly the same seat position that Mubenga had occupied and wearing the same type of handcuffs. In addition, a small number of the jurors took turns to view the scene by kneeling in a seat in the row immediately in front and leaning over to watch. This posture had been adopted by one of the three guards. The public gallery and dock were cleared while the jury took part in these recreations of the scene.'On 16 December 2014, after a six-week trial, the jury found the defendants not guilty. After the verdict was declared, Mr Mubenga's wife Adrienne said:

I am shocked and disappointed. It is hard for me to understand how the jury reached this decision with all this evidence that Jimmy said over and over that he could not breathe. I wish to thank everyone who have worked so hard for justice for me and our children. My struggle continues.

On 16 December, after the verdict, newspapers reported that racist text messages known to be on two of the defendants' phones had been kept from the jury. On 17 December newspapers and websites published more information about the 'extreme racist' texts found on the mobile phones of the defendants. The text messages had been concealed from the jury, the judge refusing to allow the jury to hear them because they did not have 'any real relevance' to the trial, he ruled. One of the messages, referring to immigrants, read:

Fuck off and go home you free-loading, benefit-grabbing, kid-producing, violent, non-English-speaking, cock suckers and take those hairy-faced, sandal-wearing, bomb-making, goat-fucking, smelly rag head bastards with you.

The jury had not been told about the texts as defence lawyers argued that "hearing about the racist material would 'release an unpredictable cloud of prejudice' in the jury, preventing a fair trial". Nor were they told of the earlier inquest coroner's concerns about the possibility of racist treatment from G4S employees towards detainees and deportees or the inquest's 'unlawful killing' verdict – sufficient omissions to destroy a criminal case against them according to a barrister quoted by the website.

A spokesman for the UK's Home Office said: "Our policy has always been that restraint during removals should only be used as a last resort. Our new bespoke training package for aircraft removals, approved in June this year, will better equip our staff with practical tools to minimise the need for restraint and ensure that only the most appropriate techniques are used".

The circumstances surrounding Mubenga's death led 41 campaign groups to call for an enquiry into G4S's suitability to run an equality helpline.

== Fraud allegations ==
In July 2013, British Justice Secretary, Chris Grayling, asked the Serious Fraud Office to investigate G4S for overcharging for tagging criminals in England and Wales, claiming that it and rival company Serco charged the government for tagging people who were not actually being monitored, including tags for people in prison or out of the country, and a small number who had died, and had done so since 2005. G4S was given an opportunity to take part in a "forensic audit" but initially refused.

Following the completion of a review by the Cabinet Office into major contracts across government, Francis Maude, Minister for the Cabinet Office announced in December 2013, that their review had "found no evidence of deliberate acts or omissions by either firm leading to errors or irregularities in the charging and billing arrangements on the 28 contracts investigated".

In March 2014, G4S agreed to pay a settlement of £109 million to the government, incorporating a refund for disputed services and reimbursement of additional costs.

== South Africa prison accusations ==
In October 2013, the BBC reported that there are allegations of prisoners being tortured at Mangaung Prison in South Africa. The BBC cites research from the Wits Justice Project at Wits University in Johannesburg, claiming that dozens of the nearly 3,000 inmates at the G4S prison have been tortured using electroshock and forced injections. As of October 2013, G4S said it was investigating the allegations. Also in 2013, after a riot in the prison, the prison was placed under administration by the South African Department of Correctional Services.

== South Africa prison escape ==
On May 3, 2022, G4S Correction Services (SA) notified the Department of Correctional Services (DCS) and the SA Police Service (SAPS) of a fire at a Mangaung Correctional Centre (MCC) and the death of Thabo Bester, a serial rapist and murderer. G4S claimed that the prisoner had set himself on fire in his cell and the matter was reported as a suicide.

On 15 March 2023, South African news agency GroundUp revealed evidence that Bester had, in fact, escaped from prison. On 24 March 2023, the Department of Correctional Services conceded that Bester had escaped. G4S did not want to admit the escape: South African National Commissioner of Correctional Services Makgothi Thobakgale said "the findings of the investigation report clearly reveal that Thabo Bester was assisted to escape from lawful custody on 3 May 2022. Yet the contractor maintains that he died in his cell." Adding "this is contrary to overwhelming scientific evidence available." G4S dismissed three employees who were on duty on the night of Bester's escape. As of May 2023, eight people, including four G4S employees, face criminal charges related to Bester's escape.

On the 7th of April 2023, Bester was arrested in Tanzania alongside his girlfriend, Dr Nandipha Magudumana and an accomplice suspected to be a Mozambican national. The trio were reportedly apprehended attempting to cross the border into Kenya.

== Immigrant-detainee labour ==
In August 2014, G4S was criticised for using immigrant detainees as cheap labour, with some being paid as little as £1 per hour. The Home Office defended the practice saying "The long-standing practice of offering paid work to detainees has been praised by Her Majesty's inspectorate of prisons as it helps to keep them occupied whilst their removal is being arranged. Whether or not they wish to participate is entirely up to the detainees themselves. This practice is not intended to substitute the work of trained staff".

== Child custodial institutions ==
Six members of staff were dismissed from G4S-operated Rainsbrook Secure Training Centre for children in Rugby in May 2015 following a series of incidents of gross misconduct. G4S took the action in response to an Ofsted inspection that reported some staff being on drugs while on duty, colluding with detainees and behaving "extremely inappropriately". The behaviour allegedly included causing distress and humiliation to children by subjecting them to degrading treatment and racist comments.

Four G4S team leaders of Medway Secure Training Centre in Rochester were arrested in January 2016 and four other staff members were placed on restricted duties, following a BBC Panorama investigation into the centre. Allegations in the television programme included foul language and use of unnecessary force – such physical violence, overuse of restraint techniques (causing one teenager to have difficulties breathing) – on ten boys aged 14 to 17, as well as a cover-up involving members of staff by avoiding surveillance cameras in order not to be recorded, and purposefully misreporting incidents in order to avoid potential fines and punishment; for example, in one exchange, it was claimed some staff did not report "two or more trainees fighting" because it indicates they had "lost control of the centre", resulting in a potential fine.

G4S-run Medway managers received performance-related pay awards in April 2016, despite the chief inspector of prisons saying weeks earlier that "managerial oversight failed to protect young people from harm at the jail". In January, the BBC's Panorama programme showed an undercover reporter working as a guard at the Medway secure training centre (STC) in Kent. The film showed children allegedly being mistreated and claimed that staff falsified records of violent incidents. No senior managers were disciplined or dismissed. Prior to the Panorama programme's broadcast, the Youth Justice Board (YJB), which oversees youth custody in England, stopped placing children in Medway. In February, a Guardian investigation revealed that, in 2003, whistleblowers had warned G4S, the Ministry of Justice (MoJ) and the YJB that staff were mistreating detained children. Their letter, forwarded by Prof John Pitts, a youth justice expert, was ignored. When the prisons inspectorate carried out a snap inspection at Medway it found detainees reported staff had used insulting, aggressive or racist language toward them and felt unsafe in facility portions not covered by closed circuit TV. Reviewers agreed to the legitimacy of evidence presented by Panorama showing "targeted bullying of vulnerable boys" by employees, and that "A larger group of staff must have been aware of unacceptable practice but did not challenge or report this behaviour."

In an earlier Ofsted report on Medway, inspectors said staff and middle managers reported feeling a lack of leadership and having "low, or no confidence in senior managers". Nick Hardwick, at the time the chief inspector of prisons said, "Managerial oversight failed to protect young people from harm. Effective oversight is key to creating a positive culture that prevents poor practice happening and ensuring it is reported when it does." The Guardian newspaper learned that senior managers at Medway received performance-related pay awards in April amounting to between 10 and 25% of their annual salaries, according to seniority. One 15-year-old girl placed at Medway in 2009 said she was frequently unlawfully restrained over 18 months, citing an occasion in which her face was repeatedly slammed into icy ground. "I assumed the senior management team would be sacked ... But now it looks like they have been rewarded for allowing children to be abused in prison", she said. Former Labour MP Sally Keeble has complained about G4S maltreatment in STCs for over ten years, stating: "This is people making personal profit out of tragedy. I hope that justice minister Liz Truss would intervene and make sure these bonuses are not being paid by a Ministry of Justice contractor." Notwithstanding the results of the investigations no senior managers at Medway were disciplined or dismissed. In May, the MoJ said the National Offender Management Service (NOMS) would take over the running of Medway. In July, it formally assumed control of the STC.

In July 2019, the management of the Medway STC was passed to the Oasis multi-academy trust. The centre was now to be Britain's first secure school, it is marketed as an education-focused alternative to youth jails. This initiative stemming from 2016, was based on a report that revealed that pupils in His Majesty's Young Offender Institutions were only receiving 15 hours of education a week on average, compared with an assumed level of 30 hours.

Ben Saunders, the head of two British immigrant centres that have been the locus of abuse of detainees was put on leave in September 2017. A parliamentary committee chair and the Opposition Labour shadow home secretary complained that G4S's contract with the Home Office limited it to a 6.8% profit on operations, but instead the pre-tax profit margins appear to have ranged between 20% and 30%. Saunders had previously directed the Medway Centre where juveniles had been found to have been abused before G4S had divested itself of its youth detention component. In February 2016, G4S had announced that it was to sell its children's services business, including the contract to manage two secure training centres.

=== Child custodial institutions in the US ===
Three escaping juveniles overpowered three guards on 18 June 2017 at Florida's Jacksonville Youth Facility. The Florida Department of Juvenile Justice is reviewing the incident which could result in corrections or contract termination. Five days following the incident, the youths had yet to be apprehended.

Although G4S had sold its youth facilities in the US in March 2017, in an August 2017 press conference, Polk County, Florida Sheriff Grady Judd aired allegations of major misconduct in child detention institutions that resulted in arrests of three former G4S top administrators of the Highland Park Youth Academy in Avon Park. Administrator Norma Wynn and Assistant Administrator Jose Sanchez were taken into custody. The charges included extreme physical abuse, tampering with, falsification and destruction of records, intimidation of both subordinates and victims to prevent reporting of criminal activities, widespread smuggling of contraband and employee sex with youths. Arrested also was Assistant Administrator Johnny Hart, who weighed 275 pounds, allegedly seized one already restrained teen from guards, threw him to the ground and "pummeled" him, necessitating the boy's hospitalization for numerous injuries.

== Police telephone data manipulation ==
In May 2016, the Independent Police Complaints Commission conducted an investigation into the practises of G4S working with Lincolnshire Police after five 999 control room staff for the police force were suspended amid claims workers made emergency calls at "quiet times" in a bid to improve call answering data. Disciplinary procedures were undertaken against the accused in accordance with company policy, and police said the staff involved are all former Lincolnshire Police employees who transferred to G4S four years ago and would be investigated by the police. However, the Crown Prosecution Service has advised that no criminal conduct has so far been revealed by the investigation.

Data for the control room seen by The Guardian show that without the extra test calls the control room would have missed its target of answering 92% of calls within 10 seconds in November and December. Only 89% of the genuine calls were answered within the target of 10 seconds but the inclusion of the test calls pushed answering performance 1% above target.

G4S took over the running of services for the force as part of a £200m deal in 2012, the largest such contract in the United Kingdom. The company aims to answer 92% of all 999 calls within 10 seconds and prior to the surfacing of these allegations, G4S previously said it had exceeded its targets for answering emergency calls.

== Electronic tagging ==
In 2014 G4S repaid money it had been paid for tagging offenders in Scotland. G4S had earlier charged the government for tagging offenders who were dead or in prison.

== Background check failures ==
In June 2017, G4S was enlisted to cover chronic staff shortages at CoreCivic's Trousdale Turner prison in Tennessee. Some G4S employees were unable to take their positions due to background screening check failures.

G4S said two screenings of Orlando, Florida, mass killer Omar Mateen —one conducted upon hiring and the other in 2013— had raised no red flags. Under Florida state law, for him to work as an armed guard the company was required either to make a full psychiatric evaluation of Mateen, or to administer a "validated written psychological test". The test administered was the updated Minnesota Multiphasic Personality Inventory (MMPI-2), a test used for job screenings and court cases. Carol Nudelman, the psychologist listed on the character certification submitted by G4S to the state, said she stopped working for the company in 2005. After the shooting, Nudelman, who was said to have evaluated and cleared Mateen for his firearms licence in 2007, according to the records of the security company G4S, denied ever meeting him or having lived in Florida at the time; she said she had stopped her practice in Florida in January 2006. G4S admitted Mateen was not actually interviewed by a psychologist, but rather a psychologist evaluated the results of a standard test used in job screenings and his test was evaluated by the firm that bought Nudelman's practice, Headquarters for Psychological Evaluation, owned by Dr Joanne Bauling. G4S said this was a "clerical error". On 10 September 2016 the Florida Department of Agriculture and Consumer Services fined G4S $151,400 for providing inaccurate psychological testing information after it found the psychologist whose opinion was necessary to permit Mateen to carry a weapon was not practicing as a screener. Between 2006 and 2016, 1,514 forms were submitted erroneously listing Nudelman's name. Mateen's form was among those investigated. He had taken the MMPI-2 and Dr. Syed Shafeeq Rahman, who had close ties with Mateen's family, gave him a medical clearance. G4S admitted Mateen's form had a "clerical error" and clarified that he had instead been cleared by Rahman, who was from the same firm that bought the wrongly-named doctor's practice. Rahman had not interviewed Mateen, but evaluated the results of a standard test used in the screening he undertook before being hired.

== Birmingham Prison ==
About 600 prisoners took part in a riot on 16 December 2016 at HM Prison Birmingham (at Winson Green, Birmingham, England), which was operated as for-profit basis by G4S. The BBC was called during the fourth riot at the prison in six weeks by prisoners at the prison. Prisoners said inadequate staffing, poor food and substandard medical care were behind the disturbance, as was being on "lockdown" in their cells all day as a major factor contributing to riot. G4S guards departed the facility and sealed two rioting wings, but it quickly spread to two additional wings. Administrative offices were sacked and inmates got access to confidential files, which they read and destroyed. The Ministry of Justice confirmed control was regained as a helicopter, canine units and riot squads from across the U.K. were employed in quelling the disturbances. Off-duty G4S guards were called back as well. The Prison Officers Association said more than 30 guards had quit the prison in recent weeks. "We've been warning for a long time about the crisis in prisons and what we are seeing at Birmingham is not unique to Birmingham, but it certainly would seem that this is the worst incident since the 1990 Strangeways riot."

Justice secretary Liz Truss informed Members of Parliament that insufficient staffing lay at the root of the Birmingham riot. She said G4S would have to pay the costs of ten highly trained public sector Tornado elite teams dispatched to end the 12-hour riot at its Birmingham prison. Three hundred and eighty prisoners were transferred from wrecked wings of the prison to other jails across England, but their dispersal led to two incidents at HM Prison Hull on Sunday, another at HM Prison Cardiff, and yet another at HM Prison Swaleside. At the riot's start, prisoners took keys from a G4S guard. At 10:00 a.m. G4S deployed two Tornado teams but that response was insufficient. Seven public sector Tornado teams were therefore necessarily dispatched to Birmingham at 11:29 a.m. Truss said that "Shortly after 10 p.m., the teams had secured all four wings". Labour MPs pressed Truss over whether prior warnings from the Birmingham independent monitoring board had been acted upon, and about the consequences of a 700 million pound budget cut and the reduction of 7,000 prison officers on the overall stability of the Prison Service. Labour said the riot should prompt the government to review the operation of prisons by private companies such as G4S and Serco. Although Truss repeatedly refused to acknowledge if she had read the Birmingham prison watchdog's October report that warned of the need for urgent action to tackle understaffing and the spread of psychoactive drugs, she said they had been discussed with the prison's governor. Truss's statement followed still another warning from John Thornhill, the president of the independent monitoring board. He said insufficient staff had caused rising levels of violence in prisons in England and Wales: "It is the board's view, echoed by prison staff, that there are insufficient staff numbers to deal with many of the day-to-day situations that occur in a local prison ... The result, as we have seen in recent weeks, is an increase in riots that damage the system. ... The impact of this unrestrained violence is that a large number of prisoners have to be transferred to other prisons that are already stretched with their own problems and staffing issues."

In August 2018, G4S's contract to run Birmingham Prison, awarded in 2011, was revoked for allowing the prison to fall into a state of crisis, and after Peter Clarke, the Government's Chief Inspector of Prisons, reported that he found squalid conditions, pervasive drug use, extraordinary levels of assaults and ineffectual management. He said it was the worst prison he had ever visited. The Shadow justice secretary, the Labour party's Richard Burgon, wrote that there should be a moratorium on awarding such contracts in the future The Independent, reviewing the corporation's history, asked how such privatization can continue. It noted that guards at Birmingham regularly were found sleeping on the job, or had locked themselves in their offices.

== Norway holdings ban ==
In November 2019, Norway's sovereign wealth fund banned all holdings in G4S because of the risk that it "contributes to or is responsible for serious or systematic human rights violations".

== Killing of General Qassem Soleimani ==
An Iranian prosecutor alleged that agents of G4S provided information on Iranian general Soleimani before he was killed by a US drone strike ordered by President Trump. Al Jazeera reported that the prosecutor did not provide evidence to support his claim.

== Hotel quarantine in the UK ==
G4S provides manpower to quarantine hotels in the UK and there have been a number of complaints made, especially against male staff.
