= Gerald Butler (judge) =

English judge

Gerald Norman Butler, QC (15 September 1930 – 28 February 2010) was an English judge, who was the senior judge at Southwark Crown Court. He was born in Hackney, London.

== Career ==
Butler was called to the bar in the Middle Temple, 1955. His career was interrupted by National Service; he was a 2nd lieutenant in the Royal Army Service Corps, 1956–57. He became a QC in 1975. He was a Recorder of the Crown Court, 1977–82, a Circuit Judge, 1982–97, and senior judge at Southwark Crown Court, 1984–97.
