= Death of Oluwashijibomi Lapite =

- Date: December 16, 1994
- Location: Hackney, London, England
- Type: Death in custody
- Cause: Asphyxia from compression of the neck
- Outcome: Inquest verdict of unlawful killing; review of CPS procedures; increased scrutiny of police conduct; abolition of the Police Complaints Authority.
- Deaths: 1 death (Oluwashijibomi Lapite)
- Injuries: Multiple injuries on Lapite's body
- Inquiries: Inquest, Butler Enquiry
- Inquest: St Pancras Coroners Court
- Coroner: Dr. Stephen Chan
- Verdict: Unlawful killing (inquest)
- Litigation: Judicial Review against CPS decision

Oluwashijibomi "Shiji" Lapite (died 16 December 1994) was a 34-year-old Nigerian asylum seeker who died in the back of a police van shortly after being detained by two officers from Stoke Newington police station in London.

The inquest verdict of unlawful killing was the second in three months on a man in police custody and it triggered fresh controversy about the use of neck holds by police when controlling suspects.

This led to a decision in the High Court when for the first time in England a Judicial Review required the Crown Prosecution Service to reassess their decision not to prosecute. It prompted an inspection and investigation by the European Committee for the Prevention of Torture, to the abolition of the Police Complaints Authority and to an inquiry by Judge Gerald Butler into the work of the Crown Prosecution Service.

== Detention and death ==
Early in the morning of 16 December 1994, Lapite left a restaurant in Hackney, London, where he had stopped to buy some friends a few drinks. Two plainclothes police officers, PC Paul Wright (aged 28) and PC Andrew McCallum (aged 24), followed him and later claimed they saw him acting suspiciously, so they stopped him.

A struggle ensued that ended, according to the officers, when Lapite had "pretended to be unconscious". When the officers realised that Lapite's condition was not a pretence he was taken to nearby Homerton Hospital where he was pronounced dead.

Officers Wright and McCallum claimed to have seen Lapite leave something by a tree when he realised he was being followed, and an undercover officer claimed he found crack cocaine valued at £4,000 in the vicinity.

One of the officers described the 5 ft 10 in Lapite as, "the biggest, strongest, most violent black man" he had ever seen. At the inquest at St Pancras Coroners Court in January 1996, the two officers described how officer Wright held Lapite in a headlock while officer McCallum admitted that he had stood up and twice kicked Lapite in the head, "as hard as I could", claiming he was using reasonable force to subdue a violent prisoner.

PC Wright told the court that Lapite had attempted to strangle him, although a Home Office pathologist said that "serious doubt must be thrown on the allegation" because of the lack of marks around the officer's neck. The coroner, Dr Stephen Chan, found more than 40 injuries on Lapite's body, including a crushed voice box and severe bruising across his back.

The cause of death was given to be asphyxia from compression of the neck, consistent with the application of a neck hold. The only injuries suffered by the police officers were a scratch on the tip of McCallum's finger and a bite mark on Wright's shoulder where he was applying the neck hold. Dr Chan noted that there was a "gross disparity" between the injuries sustained by Lapite and the two officers who had arrested him but neither officer could explain the disparity, and PC McCallum said he did not believe excessive force had been used.

The coroner told the jury they could deliver a verdict of unlawful killing only if they were satisfied that the criminal offence of manslaughter had been committed. The jury took just 20 minutes to come to a unanimous verdict that Lapite had died by unlawful killing. Following the inquest the Crown Prosecution Service said it would reconsider its earlier decision not to prosecute any of the officers involved in Lapite's death, and a spokesman for Scotland Yard said it would be sending a dossier to the Police Complaints Authority to see if any disciplinary action should follow and that the two officers remained suspended from duty.

== European Torture Convention ==
Prompted by three cases, including that of Lapite, in which inquest juries had returned verdicts of unlawful killing but the Crown Prosecution Service (CPS) had decided not to prosecute, the European Committee for the Prevention of Torture visited Britain in September 1997. The committee is the European watchdog on torture and degrading treatment which highlights failures in prosecuting and disciplining police officers and others for death or mistreatment of persons across the European Union whose liberty is restrained.

On its visit the committee met with Dame Barbara Mills QC, the Director of Public Prosecutions, Mr John Cartwright, Deputy Chairman of the Police Complaints Authority, representatives of the Police Federation and the Association of Chief Police Officers. They also visited four police stations at Brixton, Notting Hill, Peckham and Streatham, and were granted unrestricted access to all of the files they requested from the Crown Prosecution Service, the Police Complaints Authority, the Metropolitan Police Solicitors Department and the Complaints and Investigation Branch of the Metropolitan Police.

The Strasbourg-based committee, operating under the European torture convention, prepared a report on their visit which was sent to the Foreign and Commonwealth Office in March 1998. HM Government responded in April 1999 and the report was published in January 2000. In referring to complaints against police officers the report said, in part, "In reality, it is extremely rare for police officers to be convicted of a criminal offence as a result of an investigation arising out of a complaint. For example, during the year 1996-97, only 1 Metropolitan Police officer was convicted of a criminal offence as a result of an investigation arising out of a complaint. This should be viewed against an annual number of complaints against that force of between five and six thousand, of which, in recent years, over two thousand per year have involved allegations of assault."

On 23-24 July 1997, the Director of Public Prosecutions (DPP) consented to the quashing of her decision not to prosecute in the Lapite and O'Brien cases. On 31 July 1997, the Divisional Court quashed her decision not to prosecute in the Derek Treadaway case. As a result of these decisions, "additional safeguards" were put in place by the Attorney General (the Minister who is accountable to Parliament for the work of the CPS).

Henceforth, no prosecuting decision will be taken by the CPS in cases involving deaths in police or prison custody or possible serious assault charges against the police without independent advice from Treasury Counsel (i.e. from independent barristers instructed by the CPS and acting on behalf of the Crown). If the DPP disagrees with the advice given by Treasury Counsel, she must inform and consult the Attorney General and his Deputy (the Solicitor General). These additional safeguards are to remain in place until consideration has been given to the findings of Judge Gerald Butler's review into CPS decision-making in such cases".

In reviewing the whole process of complaints made of the conduct of individual police officers, and in particular the fact that even after a successful civil claim for damages there remains little likelihood of the officer facing criminal or internal disciplinary proceedings, the Committee said, "the CPT has formed the view that, as matters stand, many victims of police misconduct may have little realistic prospect of other than pecuniary redress. From the standpoint of the prevention of ill-treatment of detained persons by police officers, such a situation cannot be considered satisfactory".

In its response, HM Government highlighted a major shortcoming of the current system:

"The police are currently solely responsible for investigating criminal allegations against police officers, and the CPS is responsible for prosecutions. The CPS cannot direct the police investigation although close co-operation between the investigation and prosecution frequently cures deficiencies in cases where the CPS request the police to obtain further evidence. Once a case has been submitted to the CPS by the police, the Crown Prosecutor will decide whether or not to proceed by applying the criteria set out in the Code for Crown Prosecutors. The review of a case is a dynamic process. Although it may not be possible to proceed on the available evidence, Crown Prosecutors will always consider, with the police, what other evidence might be obtained in order to produce the best possible case. As the CPS does not investigate, however, it relies on the police to obtain further evidence or initiate investigations."

== Butler enquiry ==
The Butler enquiry was established in 1997 in response to concerns over the decision of the Crown Prosecution Service not to prosecute anyone for the death of Richard O'Brien, a father of seven, who suffocated shortly after his arrest for being drunk and disorderly in south-east London in April 1994. Relatives insisted that the police had used unnecessary force on him and the CPS pressed charges only after the family sought a Judicial Review (the first time a Judicial Review had been used for this purpose in England). Two other cases, those of Lapite and Derek Treadaway, were added to the enquiry's remit and in August 1999 Judge Gerald Butler QC published his findings.

He found that nobody at the CPS, including the former director of public prosecutions, Dame Barbara Mills QC, was prepared to take responsibility for deciding not to prosecute police officers, and that this meant that a middle-ranking CPS lawyer had made key assessments on the death of Shiji Lapite which should have been referred to more senior solicitors or outside counsel. The report also said that although the lawyer had acted "honestly and without unfair bias", he nevertheless made a basic error in the definition of manslaughter.

The judge recommended that controversial cases must be assigned to a senior lawyer in central casework, the CPS department that deals with difficult investigations, and that senior Treasury Counsel must review any decision not to press ahead with a prosecution.
