= Independent Police Complaints Commission =

English public body, 2004–2018

- Abbreviation: IPCC
- Predecessor: Police Complaints Authority
- Successor: Independent Office for Police Conduct
- Formation: 1 April 2004
- Dissolved: 8 January 2018
- Legal status: Non-departmental public body
- Purpose: Complaints about the English and Welsh police forces
- Location(s): London and five regional offices
- Region served: England and Wales
- Members: 12 commissioners
- Chair: Anne Owers
- Main organ: The Commission
- Parent organization: Home Office
- Website: www.ipcc.gov.uk

The Independent Police Complaints Commission (IPCC) was a non-departmental public body in England and Wales responsible for overseeing the system for handling complaints made against police forces in England and Wales.

On 8 January 2018, the IPCC was replaced by the Independent Office for Police Conduct.

== Creation ==
The IPCC was formally founded in 2003, replacing the Police Complaints Authority (PCA). Funded by the Home Office, the IPCC operated under statutory powers and duties defined in the Police Reform Act 2002. It was independent of pressure groups, political parties and, in principle, of government.

== Role ==
The IPCC could elect to manage or supervise the police investigation into a particular complaint and independently investigate the most serious cases itself. While some of the IPCC's investigators were former police officers, the commissioners themselves could not have worked for the police by law.

It had set standards for police forces to improve the way the public's complaints were handled. The IPCC also handled appeals by the public about the way their complaint was dealt with by the local force, or its outcomes. The IPCC was given the task of increasing public confidence in the complaint system.

From April 2006, the IPCC took on responsibility for similar, serious complaints against HM Revenue and Customs and the Serious Organised Crime Agency in England and Wales. In April 2008, it additionally took on responsibility for serious complaints against UK Border Agency staff.

== Powers ==
The statutory powers and responsibilities of the commission were set out by the Police Reform Act 2002, and it came into existence on 1 April 2004, replacing the Police Complaints Authority. It was a Non-Departmental Public Body (NDPB), funded by the Home Office, but by law entirely independent of the police, interest groups and political parties and whose decisions on cases are free from government involvement.

Between 1 April 2004 and 31 March 2009 the IPCC used its powers to begin 353 independent and 759 managed investigations into the most serious complaints against the police. These included deaths in police custody, shootings and fatal traffic incidents.

In the 2016/2017 period the IPCC received 3,846 appeals whilst managing to finalise 4,026 appeal cases in the same period.

== Investigations ==
The vast majority of complaints were dealt with by the Professional Standards department of the police force the complaint was about. The IPCC's independent investigators investigated the most serious complaints, for example where someone died following contact with the police.

There were a number of types of incidents that the police, or other agencies the IPCC oversees complaints for, must mandatorily refer to the commission. These included deaths in police custody, shootings and fatal traffic incidents as well as allegations that an officer or member of police staff committed a serious criminal offence.

Forces could also refer matters voluntarily to the IPCC and the commission could 'call in' any matter where there might have been serious public concern.

Once a matter was referred, the IPCC would make a 'mode of investigation' decision to determine how it should be dealt with. This was done by caseworkers or investigators who submitted an assessment to a Commissioner. The assessment involved judging the available information and could mean IPCC investigators are sent to the scene.

The four modes of investigation were:

- Independent investigations carried out by the IPCC's own investigators and overseen by an IPCC Commissioner. In an independent investigation, the IPCC investigators had all the powers of the police themselves.
- Managed investigations carried out by police Professional Standards Departments (PSDs), under the direction and control of the IPCC.
- Supervised investigations carried out by police PSDs, under their own direction and control. The IPCC would set the terms of reference for a supervised investigation and receive the investigation report when it is complete. Complainants had a right of appeal to the IPCC following a supervised investigation.
- Local investigations carried out entirely by police PSDs, or by other officers on their behalf. Complainants had a right of appeal to the IPCC following a local investigation.

Should new information emerge after a mode of investigation has been decided the IPCC could change the classification both up and down the scale.

IPCC Investigators were not police officers. However, IPCC investigators designated to undertake an investigation had all the powers and privileges of a police constable in relation to that investigation throughout England and Wales (Police Reform Act, 2002– Schedule 3, Paragraph 19). However, despite being established in April 2004, the first known use of these arrest powers was in 2007 when a former police officer was arrested in relation to allegations of sexual assault.

== Structure ==
The IPCC was overseen by a chair, two deputy chairs, seven operational and three non-operational commissioners. The chair is a Crown appointment and commissioners were public appointments. The IPCC's commissioners and staff were based in IPCC regional offices in Cardiff, London, Sale and Wakefield.

The IPCC's first chair was Nick Hardwick, appointed in December 2002 and taking office in February 2003; the IPCC existed in shadow form from 1 April 2003, and replaced the Police Complaints Authority on 1 April 2004.

The IPCC's last chief executive was Lesley Longstone, who was responsible for running the organisation which supports the work of the commission. Kelly was also the IPCC's accounting officer and was accountable to the Home Office Principal Accounting Officer and to Parliament. Susan Atkins was appointed to be the first chief executive of the IPCC in 2003.

As well as employing its own independent investigators to investigate the most serious cases, the IPCC had staff performing a number of other functions.

Caseworkers handled the majority of complaints that were referred to the organisation. They recorded the details of the complaint and made an assessment of the case and recommend a method of investigation, which would then be passed to a Commissioner for sign off. They also assessed appeals from the public concerning the outcome of police decisions regarding complaints.

The IPCC also took a lead role in developing new policy for the complaints system and for police practices. For example, following research about the circumstances into deaths following police activity on roads a new policy was drafted. This was adopted by ACPO and the government is making it law for police to follow.

== Commissioners ==
The IPCC's seven operational commissioners and three non-operational commissioners were appointed by the Home Secretary for a five or three-year period. The chair was appointed by the Crown on the recommendation of the Home Secretary. Commissioners by law could not have served with the police at any time, been the chair or a member of SOCA at any time or been a commissioner or officer of Customs at any time. They were the public, independent face of the IPCC.

The commission was the governing board of the IPCC, holding collective responsibility for governance of the commission including oversight of the Executive. As public office holders, commissioners oversaw IPCC investigations and the promotion of public confidence in the complaints system (known as Guardianship). Each commissioner also had responsibility for a particular portfolio such as firearms, deaths in custody, road policing and youth engagement.

Commissioners in making decisions on individual cases acted under the delegated authority of the commission. All appointments, which were full-time and non-executive were for a five-year term, and were through open competition. The commission met bi-monthly and dates were published on the IPCC website.

== Northern Ireland and Scotland ==
The IPCC self-regulation scheme covered England and Wales; oversight of the police complaints system in Northern Ireland is the responsibility of the Police Ombudsman for Northern Ireland. In Scotland the Police Investigations and Review Commissioner (PIRC) reviews the way the police handle complaints from the public and also conducts independent investigation into the most serious incidents involving the police.

== Police Action Lawyers Group resignations ==
In February 2008 over a hundred lawyers who specialise in handling police complaints resigned from its advisory body, citing various criticisms of the IPCC including a pattern of favouritism towards the police, indifference and rudeness towards complainants, and complaints being rejected in spite of apparently powerful evidence in their support.

The IPCC responded to these criticisms with a letter to The Guardian in which the then IPCC Chair, Nick Hardwick, acknowledged some cases could have been handled differently in its infancy, but pointed out that despite repeated requests for the group to provide contemporary examples where expectations had not been met, there had been no further cases identified.

It has been noted that "no policeman has ever been convicted of murder or manslaughter for a death following police contact, though there have been more than 400 such deaths in the past ten years alone.". Although a number of these were determined (by inquest juries) to be suicides, other cases such as that of Ian Tomlinson, were found by inquest juries to be unlawful killings. However, the jury in criminal proceedings acquitted the police officer accused of manslaughter in the Tomlinson case.

There have been a number of police officers convicted of causing death by dangerous driving, including those responsible for the deaths of Hayley Adamson and Sandra Simpson.

== Parliamentary Inquiry 2012 ==
On 27 June 2012 the Home Affairs Committee announced an inquiry into the IPCC including, but not limited to, analysis of the independence of the commission, the powers and responsibilities of the commission and the effectiveness of Commission investigations. The Committee began hearing evidence on 17 July 2012. The report was published on 29 January 2013 and was scathing, describing it as "woefully underequipped and hamstrung in achieving its original objectives. It has neither the powers nor the resources that it needs to get to the truth when the integrity of the police is in doubt."

== See also ==
- His Majesty's Inspectorate of Constabulary - similar agency, but with a focus on integrity of investigations and preventing malfeasance
- Jean Charles de Menezes (IPCC investigation into shooting at Stockwell Underground Station)
- Death of Mark Duggan
- Death of Ian Tomlinson
- Internal affairs (law enforcement)
- Death of Sean Rigg (IPCC investigation into death of Sean Rigg)
