= Death of Colin Roach =

Black British male who died following contact with police in 1983

Colin Roach was a 21-year-old black British man who died as a result of a fatal gunshot wound having entered a police-station reception.

The inquest ruled his death was suicide - Roach having put the barrel of a shotgun into his mouth before squeezing the trigger - inside the entrance of Stoke Newington police station, in the London Borough of Hackney, on 12 January 1983.

Amid allegations of a police cover-up, the case became a cause célèbre for civil rights campaigners and black community groups in the United Kingdom. The death was made famous by the late civil rights protester and singer Sinéad O'Connor's song "Black Boys on Mopeds".

Before Roach's death, Hackney Black People's Association had been calling for a public inquiry into policing in the area, alleging that there existed a culture of police brutality, wrongful detention of black people, racial harassment, and racially motivated "stopping and searching." Ernie Roberts, the MP for Hackney North and Stoke Newington, said that there had been "a complete breakdown of faith and credibility in the police" in the area and the Commission for Racial Equality called for a full inquiry into both the death of Roach and the policing in Hackney generally.

In June 1983 a coroner's jury returned a majority verdict of suicide. INQUEST, the United Kingdom pressure group founded following the death of Blair Peach at the hands of police in April 1979, was highly critical of the coroner's directions to the jury, and said that he had wrongly pointed them towards a verdict of suicide.

== Discrepancies ==
In November 1982 Roach had been arrested and charged with theft of a wallet and possession of an offensive weapon (a penknife). He was sentenced to three months imprisonment: he entered Pentonville Prison on 9 December. He appealed against his sentence: he was released three weeks later on 29 December 1982.

Following his release from prison, friends said Roach was worried about something but was not suicidal. On the night of his death he was a passenger in a car driven by his friend, a youth named Keith Scully, along with another passenger named Jim Joseph. During the hour-long drive, Roach appeared agitated and told Scully to keep moving, drive fast and take him somewhere where no one knew him.

After refusing his request to be dropped off at Bethnal Green Police Station, Roach told Scully he wanted to go see his brother in Stoke Newington. On dropping him near to where his brother lived, Roach said “It’s alright. I will be safe here”. Scully then saw Roach walk into the police station and so drove away to speak with Roach's father. When asked, Scully claimed Roach was ‘upset’ but not hysterical.

Roach had a sports bag with him when he entered the cell. However, the shotgun used for the suicide could only have fitted into the bag if dissassembled, and the driver who took Roach to the police station said that he did not see a bulge in Roach's bag. Additionally, no oil from the gun could be found on the bag, nor fibres from the bag on the gun. A fingerprint expert stated that, whilst no fingerprints were found on the weapon, it did not show any signs of having been wiped clean.

Irregularities were found in the records with regards to the officers present. Two police officers thought to have been present at Roach's arrest claimed they had not been there.

The police surgeon called in after Roach's death observed an inconsistency between the position of Colin Roach's body and suicide. Roach's hand was found to be uninjured, even though when the trigger of a shotgun is pulled facing oneself, the recoil damages, and may break, the thumb used to pull the trigger. The recoil should have propelled the shotgun across the room into the wall. In Roach's case, there was no sign of impact on the gun or on the police cell's wall. A gun being forced into Roach's mouth should have left marks, however, which were not found.

== Aftermath ==
Roach's death spurred protests and demands for an independent public inquiry. Such an inquiry did not take place. The coroner conducted an inquest into the incident. The verdict of the inquest was that Roach had died by suicide.

The Roach Family Support Committee commissioned its own Independent Committee of Inquiry, which published the book Policing In Hackney: 1945-1984 in 1989.

On January 12, 1993, on the 10th anniversary of the death of Colin Roach, a community facility named the Colin Roach Centre was founded by Hackney Community Defence Association and Hackney Trades Union Support Unit.

During the Undercover Policing Inquiry it emerged that several undercover police officers had spied on the Roach Family Support Committee and other groups campaigning for a public inquiry into the death of Colin Roach.

== In popular culture ==
In August 1983 The Special AKA reached number 60 in the charts with "Racist Friend" / "Bright Lights". The latter song features lyrics that mention Roach:

"I got down to London and what did I see?
One thousand policemen all over the street,
The people were shouting and looking at me,
They say 'the Colin Roach family demand an enquiry'".

The first film made by director Sir Isaac Julien was 1983's Who Killed Colin Roach? - inspired by the demonstrations Julien witnessed outside Stoke Newington police station following Roach's death.

Benjamin Zephaniah composed a poem entitled "Who Killed Colin Roach?" Roach's death is also mentioned in a track by the Ragga Twins entitled "The Iron Lady". The lyrics to "License Fi Kill" by Linton Kwesi Johnson asks the question "You can't ask Colin Roach if he really shot himself".

The 1990 album by Sinéad O'Connor, I Do Not Want What I Haven't Got includes the dedication “thanks to the Roach family” and contains a photograph on the inner sleeve of Roach's sad-faced parents standing in the rain in front of a poster of their son. Below the image is the inscription: "God's place is the world; but the world is not God's place." O'Connor's song "Black Boys on Mopeds" refers to Thatcher-era Britain where government concern with protests overseas was prioritised over domestic race issues. The song featured the lyrics "Margaret Thatcher on TV, Shocked by the deaths that took place in Beijing. England’s not the mythical land of Madame George and roses, It’s the home of police who kill black boys on mopeds". On 17 May 1989, police pursued Nicholas Bramble apparently under the suspicion he had stolen the moped he was riding (it was his own). In the attempt to evade police, Bramble lost control and crashed. His death was ruled accidental. O'Connor's lyrics take the stance that police initially suspected Bramble only because he was black.

Roach's death, and that of Altab Ali, provide context for Joe Thomas' 2023 crime novel White Riot.
