= Unlawful killing =

Verdict of an inquest in England and Wales

In English law, Irish law and Northern Irish law, unlawful killing is a verdict that can be returned by an inquest in England and Wales and Ireland when someone has been killed by one or more unknown persons. The verdict means that the killing was done without lawful excuse and in breach of criminal law. This includes murder, manslaughter, infanticide and causing death by dangerous driving. A verdict of unlawful killing generally leads to a police investigation, with the aim of gathering sufficient evidence to identify, charge and prosecute those responsible.

The inquest does not normally name any individual person as responsible. In R (on the application of Maughan) v Her Majesty's Senior Coroner for Oxfordshire the Supreme Court clarified that the standard of proof for suicide and unlawful killing in an inquest is the civil standard of the balance of probabilities and not the criminal standard of beyond reasonable doubt.

== Notable cases ==
- 6 May 1953: Ronald Maddison, an airman who died whilst acting as an experimental subject in chemical weapons testing in 1953. A verdict of unlawful killing was returned in a 2004 inquest; the original 1953 inquest had returned a verdict of misadventure.
- 14 February 1981: 48 people died following a fire at Stardust nightclub in Dublin. In April 2024, the jury of an inquest at Dublin District Coroners Court returned a verdict of unlawful killing.
- 15 April 1989: (Note: the Hillsborough disaster occurred on 15 April 1989; 94 people died on the day, with the 95th the following day, Tony Bland in 1993, and a 97th person in 2021. All 97 deaths are considered unlawful) The death of 97 Liverpool F.C. fans in the Hillsborough disaster on 15 April 1989, with the ruling returned at a second inquest in April 2016: A previous inquest in 1991 had returned a verdict of accidental death.
- 31 August 1997: Diana, Princess of Wales died in a car crash in Paris. The initial French inquiry in 1999 concluded the crash was caused by the driver's loss of control while drunk; a verdict of unlawful killing was returned in a British inquest in 2008.
- 22 November 2002: UNRWA worker Iain Hook was shot by an Israeli sniper in Jenin.
- 28 March 2003: Trooper Matty Hull, killed in a U.S. friendly fire incident in 2003.
- 13 January 2004: Tom Hurndall, shot by an Israeli sniper in the Gaza Strip in 2003.
- 7 July 2005: The fifty-two victims of the 7 July 2005 London bombings were declared on 6 May 2011 to have been unlawfully killed.
- 1 April 2009: Ian Tomlinson, who was struck with a baton and pushed to the ground by Metropolitan Police officer Simon Harwood at the G20 protests in London.
- 1 July 2009: Lt Col Rupert Thorneloe and Trooper Joshua Hammond, of the 2nd Royal Tank Regiment, were killed in an explosion in Helmand Province in Afghanistan.
- 22 March 2003: Terry Lloyd, ITN journalist, who was fired on by United States tanks near Basra.
- 29 November 2019: In May 2021, a jury ruled that failings by MI5 and the police contributed to the deaths of Saskia Jones and Jack Merritt who were unlawfully killed by a convicted terrorist.
