= Organisation and structure of the National Front (UK) =

The Organisation and structure of the National Front is the management of the National Front, a far-right political party in the United Kingdom.

== Leadership and branches ==
In its 1970s heyday, the National Front was headed by its directorate, a body of seven to twenty party members. With strict control over local and regional organisations, the directorate determined party policy, controlled its structures and finances, oversaw admissions and expulsions, and determined tactics. A third of the directorate were required to stand down every year, with a postal ballot of the membership to determine their replacements. Between 1971 and 1975, the directorate elected two of its members to be the most senior figures in the party, the chairman and deputy chairman. However, at the 1977 annual general meeting it agreed—at Tyndall's instigation—that the chairman would instead be elected through a postal ballot of the membership. As the directorate met in London infrequently, in practice the running of the party was left to the chairman and deputy chairman. The formal organisation resulted in the party's elite having most of the power, with the membership exerting little control over policy or the actions of party leaders. Fielding suggested that this centralisation of power would have presaged the framework of any NF government had they obtained power. As with most other UK political parties, in the 1970s the NF's elite was overwhelmingly male, middle-class, and relatively young. The party's constitution did not acknowledge the existence of factions, although the Front had a long history of factional rivalry within its ranks, with Wilkinson noting that it had been plagued by "personal squabbles and splits" among its hierarchy.

One variant of the National Front flag

The NF's local presence was divided into "groups", which had under twelve members, and "branches", which had over twelve. The NF was not eager to publicise how many branches were active. Fielding stated that in July 1973 the party had 32 branches and 80 groups, while Walker claimed that in January 1974, it had 30 branches and 54 groups. The majority were in south-east England, with 11 branches and 8 groups in Greater London and 5 branches and 22 groups elsewhere in the south-east. It had five branches and 3 groups in the midlands, 7 branches and 11 groups in the north, 1 branch and 7 groups in western Britain, and one group each in Scotland and Northern Ireland. Each branch or group had its own five-person committee, with annual elections for the committee positions. NF branch meetings were much like those of other British political parties, preoccupied largely with practical issues like raising finances. Typically, branch meetings took place in a pub. Some NF branches also established supporters' associations for individuals who backed the NF but were not willing to become members out of fear of potential repercussions. In April 1974, the party introduced regional councils to co-ordinate between the national party and its local groups and branches. These regional councils were required to contain two members from each branch in the region.

Supporter organisations were established among white communities of British descent elsewhere in the world; in New Zealand in 1977 and in Australia, Canada, and South Africa in 1978. After the Strasserite faction secured control in 1986, it formally adopted a cadre system of leadership. This made the party more elitist, creating what the Strasserites called "a revolutionary cadre party – a movement run by its most dedicated and active members rather than by armchair nationalists". This was linked to the idea—promoted through a book by Holland—that each NF member should be a "political soldier", a "New Type of Man" who rejected the "materialist nightmare" of contemporary capitalist society and underwent a personal "Spiritual Revolution" through which they dedicated themselves fully to the nation.

== Security and violence ==
The Front was preoccupied with security, refusing to reveal information about its leader's standard working hours or the number of staff at its headquarters. During the 1970s, it created a card-index and photo file of its opponents' names and addresses. To guard its marches from anti-fascists, the NF formed "defence groups" largely made up of young men—by 1974 called the "Honour Guard"—whose members often carried makeshift weapons like iron bars and bicycle chains. These marches often took place in areas that had experienced high levels of immigration; in doing so the NF sought to instil fear in immigrant communities, whip up racial tensions, and generate publicity by clashing with counter-protesters, all of which it could exploit politically. These tactics have continued into more recent times; in August 2017, around thirty NF supporters marched in Grantham, Lincolnshire, where they clashed with members of the Midland Anti-Fascist Network. In some instances, local authorities banned its marches; in 2012, Aberdeen City Council rejected the NF's request to hold a procession down Aberdeen's Union Street on Hitler's birthday.

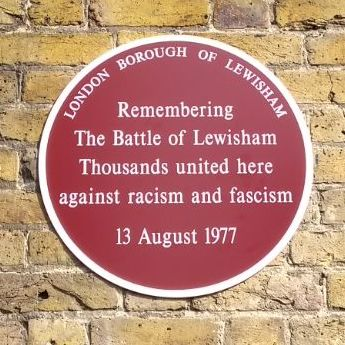
Plaque memorialising the "Battle of Lewisham" in which anti-fascist protesters combatted a National Front march in 1977

The Front claimed that its members only resorted to violence in self-defence. On observing the group during the 1970s however, Fielding noted that "the NF uses force aggressively", and was "not above exacting revenge" on its critics. Fielding believed the most notable violent clash involving the NF was the Red Lion Square disorders in June 1974. An NF meeting at central London's Conway Hall resulted in clashes between the NF, anti-fascists, and police stationed to keep the peace; 54 demonstrators were arrested, many were injured, and one anti-fascist, Kevin Gateley, was killed. Gateley's was the first death at a British demonstration since 1919. Another prominent clash took place in Lewisham, south-east London in August 1977. The NF marchers were met by a group called the All Lewisham Campaign against Racism and Fascism (ALCARAF), although Trotskyist groups regarded ALCARAF's peaceful response as ineffective and attacked the NF marchers, resulting in the "Battle of Lewisham". In April 1979, an anti-NF demonstration in Southall clashed with police seeking to keep the NF and anti-fascists apart; the violence resulted in the death of Blair Peach.

The NF also disrupted the meetings of anti-fascist groups and mainstream politicians. In November 1975, NF activists attacked a National Council of Civil Liberties meeting at the University of Manchester, with eight people requiring hospitalisation. In another instance, 80 NF activists stormed a meeting held by the Liberal Party to discuss the Rhodesian Bush War and the transition to black-majority rule in Rhodesia. NF members threw flour bombs and chairs at the delegates while chanting "White Power". Another event disrupted by the NF was a town hall meeting in Newham, where members pelted the Home Secretary Roy Jenkins with flour bombs and manure.

There have also been actions carried out by right-wing extremists where covert NF involvement was suspected but not proven. This can result from NF members engaging in "freelance" activism not authorised by the party hierarchy. For instance, in February 1974, several men put up NF posters in Brighton, assaulted passers by whom they accused of being Jewish, and attacked staff at the Communist Party of Britain (Marxist-Leninist) bookshop. The local NF branch denied knowledge of the incident or the individuals in question. In June 1978, the Anti-Nazi League headquarters was hit by an arson attack; the slogan "NF Rules OK" was graffitied on the building. Again, the NF denied responsibility. The party's leadership showed little concern with the violent activities of such members and supporters, and openly praised some of its members convicted of violent criminal activity.

== Sub-groups and propaganda output ==
The NF promoted its cause through various sub-groups and organisations. Tyndall believed the NF should take control of the trade union movement and suppress the leftists within it. In June 1974, it launched the NF Trade Unionists Association, and also issued a sporadic and short-lived magazine aimed at trade unionists, The British Worker. During the 1970s it encouraged members to infiltrate other groups, such as the Hunt Saboteurs Association and ratepayers' and residents' associations, to promote the NF within them. In 1978, the party's directorate established a legal department to deal with the growing number of members being charged with inciting racial hatred under the 1976 Race Relations Act.

In 1973, the political scientist Max Hanna noted that the party was planning on rearing its own academics. That decade, it formed a Student Association, and issued the student magazine Spark. The NF Student Association initially tried recruiting students on university campuses, but on having little success it refocused attention towards recruitment in schools and sixth forms. In 1978 it launched the Young National Front (YNF), membership was restricted to 14 to 25 years olds; it was through this group that Griffin and Pearce, later influential party figures, joined. The YNF issued a newsletter, Bulldog, which was edited by Pearce, and held "training seminars" for schoolchildren. The YNF distributed leaflets and copies of Bulldog at football matches and concerts that it believed would attract large numbers of white working-class people, and organised its own football competition between YNF teams from different cities. The YNF also encouraged young women to join the party and used sexualised imagery of its female members to attract young male recruits. Bulldog for instance carried an advert urging female supporters to become "a Bulldog bird" by sending in photographs of themselves, "the sexier the better", for publication in the magazine.

Are we gonna sit and let them come?
Have they got the white man on the run?
Multi-racial society is a mess.
We ain't gonna take much more of this

— Skrewdriver, "White Noise", the first song released by the NF's White Noise Records

The NF observed how the left mobilised anti-fascist support through musical ventures like Rock Against Racism, and decided to employ similar techniques. In 1979, Pearce—then the YNF leader—established Rock Against Communism (RAC), through which the NF held concerts featuring neo-Nazi skinhead bands. The first RAC event was held in Conway Hall in August 1979, and featured performances by The Dentists, Homicide, and White Boss. Tyndall and other senior NF members liked the opportunity for expanding party membership that RAC offered them, but were concerned that associations with the skinhead subculture would damage the NF's image.

After Tyndall left the party, in 1982 RAC was revived with Skrewdriver as its flagship band; they had been having difficulty finding venues willing to host them due to the violence that often accompanied its performances. In 1983 the NF launched a record label, White Noise Records, which became a new means of disseminating NF ideas and an important source of revenue for several years. The RAC had difficulty finding venues willing to stage its concerts, although in 1984 it got around this by staging its first large open-air concert at the rural home of Nick Griffin's parents in Suffolk. The assembled crowd responded to Skrewdriver's performance with Nazi salutes and calls of "sieg heil" while the band's Ian Stuart responded with "Fucking right Sieg Heil, fucking nigger bashing". To further promote this music scene, senior NF members also established the White Noise Club which distributed the White Noise magazine internationally. Later in the 1980s, Skrewdriver broke from the NF and the White Noise Club to establish its own far-right music promotion network, Blood & Honour.
