= Death of Blair Peach =

1979 police killing of a protestor in London

Coordinates: 51.51051°N 0.38034°W

Blair Peach
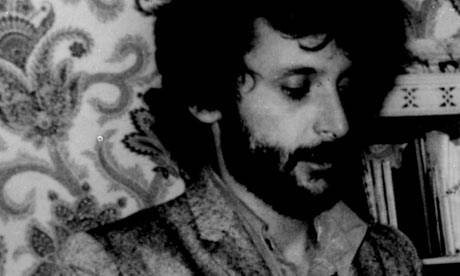
- Born: Clement Blair Peach; 25 March 1946; Napier, New Zealand
- Died: 24 April 1979 (aged 33); Southall, London, England
- Cause of death: Head trauma
- Occupation: Teacher

Clement Blair Peach (25 March 1946 – 24 April 1979) was a New Zealand teacher who was killed during an anti-racism demonstration in Southall, London, England. A campaigner and activist against the far right, in April 1979 Peach took part in an Anti-Nazi League demonstration in Southall against a National Front election meeting in the town hall and was hit on the head, probably by a member of the Special Patrol Group (SPG), a specialist unit within the Metropolitan Police Service. He died in hospital that night.

An investigation by Commander John Cass of the Metropolitan Police's Complaints Investigation Bureau concluded that Peach had been killed by one of six SPG officers, and others had preserved their silence to obstruct his investigation. The report was not released to the public, but was available to John Burton, the coroner who conducted the inquest; excerpts from a leaked copy were also published in The Leveller and The Sunday Times in early 1980. In May 1980 the jury in the inquest arrived at a verdict of death by misadventure, although press and some pressure groups—notably the National Council for Civil Liberties—expressed concern that no clear answers had been provided, and at the way Burton conducted the inquest.

Celia Stubbs, Peach's partner, campaigned for the Cass report to be released and for a full public inquiry. An inquiry was rejected, but in 1988 the Metropolitan Police paid £75,000 compensation to Peach's family. In 2009 Ian Tomlinson died after he was struck from behind by a member of the Territorial Support Group, the SPG's successor organisation; the parallels in the deaths proved to be the catalyst in the release of the Cass report to the public. The Metropolitan Police commissioner, Sir Paul Stephenson, released the report and supporting documentation. He also offered an official apology to Peach's family.

The policing of the demonstration in Southall damaged community relations in the area. Since Peach's death the Metropolitan Police have been involved in a series of incidents and poorly conducted investigations—the 1993 murder of Stephen Lawrence, the death of Jean Charles de Menezes in 2005, the botched 2006 Forest Gate raid and the death of Tomlinson—all of which tarnished the image of the service. Peach's death has been remembered in the music of the Pop Group, Ralph McTell and Linton Kwesi Johnson; the National Union of Teachers set up the Blair Peach Award for work for equality and diversity issues and a school in Southall is named after him.

== Background ==
=== Blair Peach ===
Clement Blair Peach was born in Napier, New Zealand, on 25 March 1946, to Clement and Janet Peach. He was one of three brothers, the others being Roy and Philip; the former was a solicitor and led the family's legal campaign after Blair's death. Blair was schooled at Colenso College, then studied education and psychology at the Victoria University of Wellington, where he co-edited the Argot literary magazine with his flatmate Dennis List and David Rutherford. During his studies Peach visited Britain and liked the country. After graduating he was employed in several temporary jobs, but was turned down for compulsory military training for having an "unsuitable character". He emigrated to Britain in 1969 and was soon employed as a teacher at the Phoenix special needs school in Bow, east London. In 1970 he entered a long-term relationship with Celia Stubbs; they had first met in New Zealand in 1963 when she was visiting the country. Peach helped raise Stubbs's two daughters from her previous relationship, and the couple regarded each other as husband and wife.

Peach was politically active and joined the Socialist Workers' Party, Socialist Teachers' Association and the local branch of the National Union of Teachers. He was also a committed opponent of racism and was active in the Anti-Nazi League. He had been arrested previously when campaigning on political issues, and in 1974 he was charged with threatening behaviour after challenging a local publican's refusal to serve black customers; he was acquitted.

=== Southall ===
Southall, London

As a result of the population transfers after the 1947 partition of India over ten million people were impoverished. From the late 1950s a significant number of them relocated. Many Sikhs and Hindus left the subcontinent to settle in Greater London, particularly Southall, where shortages of workers at factories, and the employment prospects at nearby Heathrow Airport meant jobs were easily obtainable. Some of the early arrivals found work at the R. Woolf and Co Rubber factory; by 1965 all the lower level workers were from Poland or the Indian subcontinent. (Note: The manager of the factory had served alongside Sikh troops during the Second World War and was happy to employ them.) Racial discrimination in the workplace was common; 85 per cent of those Asian workers who had been given entry into the UK on the basis of their education or training were employed only in unskilled or semi-skilled roles. Kennetta Hammond Perry, in her history of post-war immigration, identifies the reasons as being "in part because of perceptions about their level of competence and stereotypes about their ability to speak English". Indian workers also faced discrimination from the white-dominated trade unions, and so formed their own organisation, the Indian Workers' Association (IWA).

During local elections of the 1960s anti-immigration rhetoric was used by some candidates, successfully in many cases. Smaller right-wing parties used immigration as a platform on which to stand, including in Southall. In the local elections of May 1964, the anti-immigration British National Party (BNP) polled 15 per cent of the vote in Southall; in the general election that October the BNP leader, John Bean, received 9.1 per cent in the Southall constituency. Bean won 7.4 per cent of the vote at the 1966 general election. The BNP's successor, the National Front, recorded 4.4 per cent of the vote at the 1970 general election.

In June 1976 the racist murder of Gurdip Singh Chaggar in Southall—outside the offices of the IWA—led to the former chairman of the National Front, John Kingsley Read, stating "one down, a million to go". (Note: Reid was later charged under the Race Relations Act 1965, but was acquitted.) Chaggar's murder led to the formation of the Southall Youth Movement (SYM) to challenge the rise in racism and attacks from the National Front. Rioting in the area took place between police and Asian youths and members of Peoples Unite, a similar group to the SYM, but consisting of young Afro-Caribbeans.

=== Special Patrol Group ===
The Special Patrol Group (SPG) was formed in 1961 as a specialist squad within the Metropolitan Police. (Note: The original name was the Special Patrol Group Unit; this was renamed Special Patrol Group in 1965.) It provided a mobile, centrally controlled reserve of uniformed officers which supported local areas, particularly when policing serious crime and civil disturbances. The SPG comprised police officers capable of working as disciplined teams preventing public disorder, targeting areas of serious crime, carrying out stop and searches, or providing a response to terrorist threats. In 1978 there were 1,347 SPG members in forces across the UK, 204 of them in the Metropolitan Police Service. They were divided into six units, each of which contained three sergeants and 30 constables. Each unit was commanded by an inspector.

The use of the SPG proved controversial to some. It was involved in the Red Lion Square disorders, when Kevin Gately, a student demonstrating against a National Front march, was killed from a blow to the head from a blunt instrument; the perpetrator was never identified. Accusations were made that the police were inappropriately violent towards those demonstrating. The former chief constable, Tim Brain, writes "their critics viewed them with suspicion as a force within a force"; the Metropolitan Police history observes that "their presence sometimes came to assume unwanted symbolic significance". The former chief constable Geoffrey Dear states that the SPG "might apparently solve one problem but in its wake create another of aggravated relationships between minority groups and the police in general".

The SPG was disbanded in 1986 and, replaced by District Support Units (DSU). (Note: Officers in one unit beat three black youths and then conspired to pervert the course of justice.) After receiving bad press, the DSU were replaced by the Territorial Support Group in January 1987.

== 23 April 1979 ==
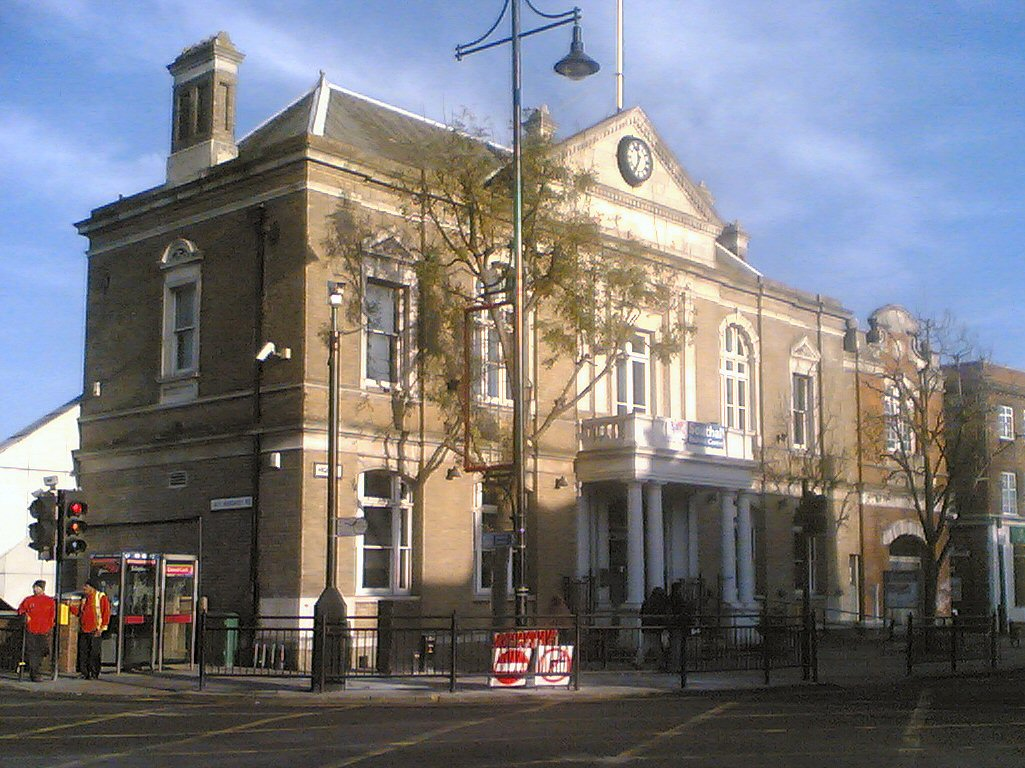
The old Southall town hall, where the National Front rally took place

In the run-up to the 1979 general election, the National Front announced that it would hold a meeting at Southall Town Hall on 23 April 1979, St George's Day. Southall was to be one of 300 parliamentary seats for which the organisation put up candidates. Prior to the Southall meeting, similar events had resulted in clashes with anti-racist protesters, including in Islington, north London, on 22 April, and in Leicester the following day. At both events, police had been injured trying to keep the two sides separate.

A petition of 10,000 residents was raised to cancel the meeting, but to no effect. Ealing Council had blocked previous meetings by the National Front, but, under the Representation of the People Act 1969, they allowed the party to use the hall. The day before the meeting a march by the IWA was planned from central Southall, past the town hall, and ending at Ealing Town Hall. Approximately 1,200 police officers were on duty along the five-mile (eight-kilometre) route; 19 people were arrested. Two counter-demonstrations for the day of the meeting were planned: a picket on the pavement opposite the hall, and a seated demonstration outside it. To deal with the potential violence, 2,876 police officers were drafted in, 94 of whom were on horseback; they arrived at 11:30 am and demonstrators began gathering at 1:00 pm in preparation for the 7:30 pm National Front meeting.

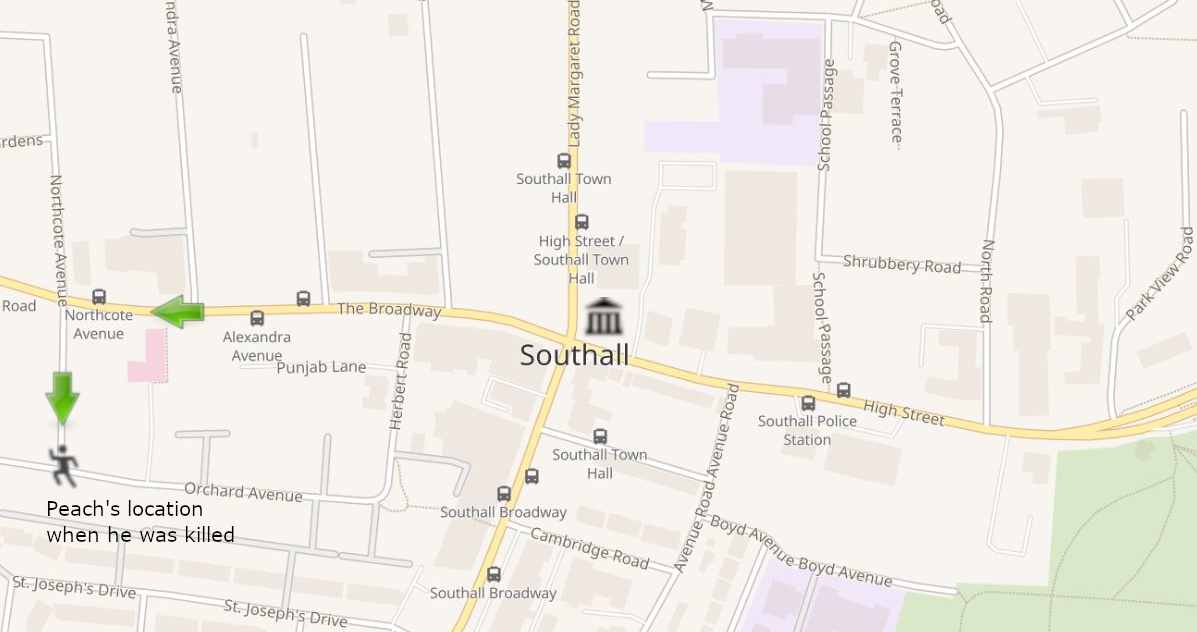
Southall, showing the position of the town hall and where Peach was killed; the green arrows show Peach's direction of travel while trying to leave the area

The number of demonstrators at the town hall rose, and included some whom the police considered militant elements. There were some clashes between police and protesters and a small number of arrests ensued. The police decided to establish a sterile cordon around the town hall, although they still allowed a small, contained demonstration in the High Street. Cordons were set up on Lady Margaret Road, the Broadway, High Street and South Road. Between 2:30 and 3:15 pm, at the High Street cordon, missiles were thrown at the police, who used riot shields to contain the crowd.

According to the official police report, between 5:30 and 6:30 pm the level of violence rose as the crowd at the High Street cordon again began to throw missiles and at about 6:20 pm between 500 and 2,000 protesters tried to breach the police lines. In response, mounted officers were brought in to disperse the crowd. The author Yasmin Alibhai-Brown, who was present at the demonstration, thought the mood changed when the police tactics changed from containment to dispersement, which triggered the missile-throwing reaction from the crowd.

A house on Park View Road, the headquarters of Peoples Unite, was used as a first aid post. The official police report states that the residents were "a group of mainly Rastafarians" who were squatting at the premises, and that these occupants threw missiles from the house at police in the street. (Note: The police report describes the missiles thrown as a smoke canister and stones, while one of the founders of the pressure group INQUEST states that they were two flares.) SPG officers entered the house and an altercation broke out in which two officers were stabbed. Those in the house—including those manning the first aid post and those receiving treatment—were beaten with truncheons, and an estimated £10,000 of damage was done to the contents of the house, including the equipment for the band Misty in Roots; the group's manager, Clarence Baker, went into a coma for five months after his skull was fractured by a police truncheon. (Note: £10,000 in 1979 equates to approximately £49,000 in 2025, according to calculations based on the Consumer Price Index measure of inflation.) All those inside were removed from the property, regardless of what they were doing, and there were subsequent complaints by the inhabitants of racist and sexist abuse by the police. Seventy people were arrested either at or near the address. At the trial of one of those arrested, one of the SPG officers involved reported "there was no overall direction of the police forces at this time" and the situation was "a free for all".

National Front members began arriving from 7:00 pm. At its scheduled time their meeting took place. During the assembly, one of the organisation's speakers called for "the bulldozing of Southall and its replacement by a 'peaceful English hamlet'". Four members of the public were allowed into the hall to fulfil the requirements of the Representation of the People Act, but a journalist from The Daily Mirror was stopped from entering because the newspaper was considered to be "nigger loving". When the meeting ended at about 10:00 pm, some of the attendees gave Nazi salutes on the steps of the town hall before being escorted to safety by the police.

Police making arrests as the rioting was in progress

Once the meeting was underway, the police decided to clear the area of demonstrators and allowed them to pass along the Broadway towards the crossroads with Northcote Avenue and Beachcroft Avenue. At about 7:30 pm Peach, with four friends, decided to return to their cars and moved towards the junction. The group had been on the Broadway since they arrived in the area at 4:45 pm. At around the same time a flare or petrol bomb was thrown either at or over a police coach on the Broadway. The driver—with a policeman standing next to him—drove the coach through the crowd; no-one was injured, but eyewitnesses said that the mood of the crowd changed at that point. Two SPG vans drove westwards along the Broadway and collected two crates of bricks and bottles that the crowd left behind as they retreated. Items were thrown at the two vehicles and a police inspector on a building roof radioed to the central control unit that there was a riot in progress.

Peach and his friends turned off the Broadway down Beachcroft Avenue, thinking they were heading out of the area, but not realising the road only connected to Orchard Avenue, which led back to The Broadway and the heavy police cordon there. There was a group of 100 to 150 protesters on the corner of the Broadway and Beachcroft Avenue and the SPG vans of Unit 3 drove to the junction of the Broadway with Northcote Avenue and Beachcroft Avenue to face them. As the officers deployed out of the vehicles they were hit by missiles from the crowd. One officer was hit in the face by a brick which fractured his jaw in three places. The inspector leading the unit radioed "Immediate assistance required".

The official investigation into Peach's death states that the events leading up to this point, while difficult, were relatively straightforward, but that "further description of what happened" is hampered by "conflicting accounts [that] have been given by private persons and also by police". The radio call from Unit 3 was picked up by SPG Unit 1, two of whose vans drove into Beachcroft Avenue from the Broadway entrance and stopped at the corner with Orchard Avenue. They deployed while under bombardment from bricks and stones. The first person to exit the van was Inspector Alan Murray, who had charge of the first van of Unit 1 (called Unit 1-1), and was followed by constables Bint, White, Freestone, Richardson and Scottow. Murray and his men were using riot shields, had their truncheons drawn and worked to disperse the crowd. During this action Peach received a blow on the head. Fourteen witnesses stated that they saw it happen and said that it was a police officer who struck the blow. One resident told the inquest that she:

saw blue vans coming down Beachcroft Avenue. They were coming very fast—as they came round Beachcroft Avenue, they stopped. I saw policemen with shields come out—people started running and the police tried to disperse them. I saw police hitting. I saw a white man standing there ... The police were hitting everybody. People started running, some in the alley, some in my house ... I saw Peach, I then saw the policeman with the shield attack Peach.

Peach was taken into a nearby house—71 Orchard Avenue—after one of the residents saw him being hit. He was given a glass of water, but could not hold it. His eyes were rolled up to the top of his head and he had difficulty speaking. The residents soon called an ambulance, which was logged at 8:12 pm; it arrived within ten minutes, and Peach was taken to Ealing Hospital. He was promptly operated on because of a large extradural haematoma but his condition worsened through the procedure. He died at 12:10 am on 24 April.

There were 3,000 protesters in Southall on 23 April. The police arrested 345 people. Ninety-seven police were injured, as were 39 of the prisoners; 25 members of the public were also injured, of whom Peach was one. A member of the National Front was found near Southall train station, badly beaten. He spent two days in intensive care before being released.

== Aftermath ==
Within a day of Peach's death, Commander John Cass of the Metropolitan Police's Complaints Investigation Bureau began an investigation of the events and statements were taken from members of the SPG that day. Sir David McNee, then the Commissioner of the Metropolitan Police, also undertook his own eight-day review of the demonstrations, although he did not include Peach's death as part of his analysis.

The inquest opened on 26 April 1979; John Burton, the coroner for West London, oversaw the proceedings. On the opening day he allowed Peach's family to have a second post-mortem examination undertaken by an independent pathologist; the inquest was then adjourned for a month. It reconvened on 25 May 1979 and was again adjourned after Cass appeared as a witness and said that his investigation would take between two and three months more. By that time, he and his team had interviewed 400 people. Burton said that the inquiry would reconvene after Sir Tony Hetherington, the Director of Public Prosecutions (DPP), had been given the report.

Part of the cortège of Peach's funeral, 13 June 1979

Despite statements by the police and the incumbent government that the trouble at Southall was caused by outsiders to the area, only 2 of the 342 charged were non-residents of Southall. Instead of holding the trials locally, they were held 25 miles (40 km) away in Barnet. (Note: The charges under which most people were tried were of the level seen by magistrates' courts. The closest of these were those in Ealing—the same borough as the offences. Only six people were tried in Crown Courts, which are reserved for more serious offences.) Lalith de Kauwe, writing for Bulletin—the publication of the Haldane Society of Socialist Lawyers—writes that while initially 90 per cent of the defendants were found guilty, this dropped to 70 per cent once the press began to publicise the matter.

On 12 June 1979 Peach's body was laid out at the Dominion Cinema in Southall; 8,000 people filed past it. The following day he was buried at East London Cemetery, where between 5,000 and 10,000 people were in attendance. (Note: Figures for the number vary. The Guardian newspaper carried a report of a cortège of 5,000; the Oxford Dictionary of National Biography and David Ransom, in his history of the subject, state 10,000 people attended.) Three days after the funeral, McNee defended the actions of the SPG and told a black reporter "I understand the concern of your people. But if you keep off the streets of London and behave yourselves you won't have the SPG to worry about."

=== Cass investigation ===
One member of SPG Unit 1-1 was questioned by Cass's team in early June 1979 after the forensic report stated that Peach was probably not killed by a police truncheon, but by a lead-filled cosh or pipe. A search of the unit's lockers found 26 weapons—including police truncheons—many of which were unauthorised, including coshes and knives, as well as sets of keys and a stolen driving licence. (Note: A sample list of the weapons found in the lockers of Unit 1-1's members included a crowbar, metal cosh, whip handle, stock ship, brass handle, knives, American-style truncheons, a rhino whip and a pickaxe handle.) Cass's team raided the home of PC Grenville Bint, where weapons and Nazi memorabilia were found. Bint stated he collected the memorabilia as a hobby.

During his investigation Cass held several identification parades, including for Officer F, Officer G and Officer I. (Note: When Cass's report was released to the public, all names—including that of Cass himself—were redacted. The only name that appeared in the report was that of Peach.) These were identified by the barrister and historian David Renton from the inquest as PCs Raymond White, James Scottow and Anthony Richardson, respectively. No witness managed to identify the man they saw hitting Peach. It later transpired that one officer present at the riots shaved off the moustache which he had that day, while Inspector Murray grew a beard and refused to take part in the identity parades. Many of the uniforms that the police wore that day had been dry-cleaned before they were inspected. Cass ran up against misleading stories from the members of Unit 1-1 and in his report he stated "The attitude and untruthfulness of some of the officers involved is a contributory factor." He continued "The action of these officers clearly obstructed the police officers carrying out their duty of investigating this serious matter." Cass decided that he had identified the individual whom he considered most likely to have hit Peach, but that there was "no evidence of a conclusive nature":

The officers in that carrier after disembarking, who could have assaulted Clement Blair PEACH were Officer E, Officer H, Officer G, Officer I, Officer J and Officer F, and I give them in that order of possibility.

Renton identified these officers as Murray, Bint, Scottow, Richardson, Freestone and White, respectively. Cass's report was accepted by the police as being accurate, and in his 1983 autobiography McNee wrote "when all the evidence was assembled it showed that Blair Peach had died from a blow to his skull. The evidence pointed to the fact that the blow had been struck by a police officer."

=== Coroner's inquest ===
Cass finished the investigation in February 1980; 30 investigators had worked for 31,000 man-hours during his enquiries. He finished his initial report on 12 July 1979, which was sent to the DPP, who, while praising the work he had done, stated that "there was insufficient evidence to justify a prosecution". The inquest reopened a week later. Both Burton and the lawyers representing the Metropolitan Police were given copies of Cass's report, but refused to provide copies to the lawyers representing the Peach family or those representing the Anti-Nazi League. Burton used Cass's report to determine which witnesses to call and which to ignore. Michael Dummett, Wykeham Professor of Logic at Oxford University, examining the case for the National Council for Civil Liberties, observes that as only the coroner and police lawyers had copies of the report, "it was impossible for anyone ... [else] to obtain a complete picture of the evidence". The question of whether the family were allowed to view the reports was taken to a Divisional Court, who ruled that as the report was the property of the police, they had the right to withhold it.

Legal counsel for the Peach family requested that the inquest be held in front of a jury, which Burton rejected; the inquest was again adjourned. The High Court rejected a challenge to overturn Burton's decision, which then went to the Court of Appeal where Lord Denning stated that the inquest should reconvene in front of a jury.

In early 1980 sections of the Cass report were published in The Leveller (January 1980) and The Sunday Times (March 1980). Details included in both publications were the names of Murray, White, Freestone, Richardson and Scottow. The latter publication indicated that the decision by the DPP not to prosecute the policemen "left the investigating officers in the invidious position of appearing party to a cover-up, should their report ever become public". In April 1980—the one-year anniversary of Peach's death—members of the group "Friends of Blair Peach Committee" picketed outside police stations holding posters that named the six members of SPG Unit 1-1 and the words "Wanted for the murder of Blair Peach".

The inquest reconvened on 28 April 1980 and was expected to last several weeks. Both pathologists—David Bowen for the coroner and Keith Mant acting for the family—came to the same conclusions: that death was from a single blow, not a police truncheon, but a "rubber 'cosh' or hosepipe filled with lead shot, or some like weapon". Both stated that Peach had a thin skull, but not, as Mant observed, "pathologically thin". He described the action that caused the injury as "a very severe, single blow".

The inquest closed on 27 May 1980 during which time 83 witnesses were called. A verdict of death by misadventure was given. The criminologists Phil Scraton and Paul Gordon consider that, given the conclusions of the Cass report, unlawful killing would have been a more appropriate verdict. In its leader the following day, The Times said that "the Peach inquest failed to provide a clear and believable explanation of the events in question"; it also stated that Peach's death should continue to be investigated.

The National Council for Civil Liberties expressed concern at the way Burton conducted the inquest. The organisation felt uneasy with a theory that he put to the jury: that Peach was killed by "some political fanatic" in order to make him a martyr against the police. During the course of the inquest, Burton wrote to ministers to say that the question of whether Peach was killed by a police officer was a "political 'fabrication'". He also wrote to the home secretary, lord chancellor and attorney general, claiming that there was a conspiracy to spread false information about Peach's death; he accused several media outlets, including the BBC, of producing what he described as "biased propaganda". In 2010 The Daily Telegraph considered that Burton had shown a "lack of sympathy ... towards Mr Peach's death".

After the inquest Burton wrote a seven-page article entitled "The Blair Peach Inquest – the Unpublished Story", which he wanted to publish in the Coroners' Society annual report. In the article, he said that some civilian witnesses lied and were "totally politically committed to the Socialist Workers Party", and he thought that some of the Sikh witnesses "did not have experience of the English system" to give reliable evidence. He was persuaded not to publish the account by civil servants, who considered that the report would "discredit the impartiality of coroners in general and Dr Burton in particular".

== Subsequent events ==
There were several calls for a public inquiry to examine the circumstances surrounding Peach's death and the role of the police; 79 MPs supported such a hearing, but the government refused to hold such a review. The Peach family also challenged the Metropolitan Police in court for the Cass report and supporting papers to be released. In February 1986 the Court of Appeal ruled that the police should release the statements and supporting papers, but not the report itself. The family also sought to claim damages from the Metropolitan Police and in June 1988, after eight years of trying, they were awarded £75,000. (Note: £75,000 in 1986 equates to approximately £224,000 in 2025, according to calculations based on the Consumer Price Index measure of inflation.) The political historian Mick Ryan observes that the Peach case is an example where "compensation is ... paid in tacit admission that a wrong had been committed". In April 1999 Paul Boateng, the Minister of State for Home Affairs, was the final minister who turned down the request for a public inquiry, saying the event had happened too long ago to be beneficial.

Following correspondence with the Peach family at the time of the twentieth anniversary of Peach's death, Commander Ian Quinn of the Metropolitan Police's complaints bureau undertook a review of investigation in 1999. The family were not told of the investigation or its outcome.

On 1 April 2009, at the 2009 G20 London summit protests, a member of the Territorial Support Group, the SPG's successor organisation, struck Ian Tomlinson, a newspaper vendor, who collapsed and died. The parallels in the deaths of the two men proved to be the catalyst in the release of the Cass report to the public. Stephenson also officially apologised to Peach's family. That June the Metropolitan Police commissioner, Sir Paul Stephenson announced that Cass's report and supporting documentation would be released.

=== SPG Unit 1-1 ===
After Stephenson's announcement that the Metropolitan police would publish the Cass report, Murray stated that he believed he was the officer referred to in the report as "Officer E", but said that "Under no circumstances was I involved in the death of Blair Peach. I was not involved in his death. I'm as certain as I can be." Murray considered Cass's report to be "pure fabrication to justify his failure to identify the perpetrator of this act". Angered at the handling of the initial investigation, Murray left the police and joined his brother's jewellery business in Scotland before becoming a lecturer in corporate responsibility at the University of Sheffield.

Two days after the Nazi memorabilia and unauthorised weapons were found in his possession, Bint was transferred out of the SPG. Richardson and Freestone were transferred out soon afterwards; Scottow and White voluntarily transferred. All the officers left the police force shortly after the investigation ended.

=== Undercover Policing Inquiry ===
In 2021 evidence was provided to the Undercover Policing Inquiry that the Metropolitan Police monitored Stubbs with undercover officers for about twenty years. This included taking photographs at Peach's funeral and creating an attendee list report, and monitoring the 20th anniversary event planning in 1998.

== Impact ==
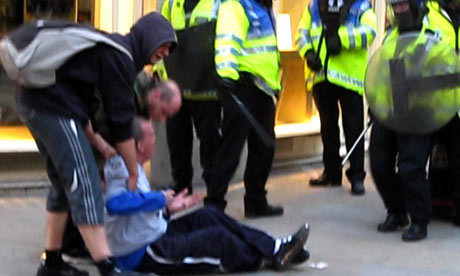
Ian Tomlinson, just after being struck to the ground by police. His death was the catalyst for the release of the Cass report.

Following the actions of the police at Southall, the Asian community in the area felt that relations between them and the police had broken down; many saw the police as aggressors. One member of the community said "Our feeling now towards the police is one of shock. In India the police are very brutal, but none of us believed until Monday night that the police here could behave equally brutally." The journalists Mark Hughes and Cahal Milmo consider that the action of the SPG "became a symbol of police corruption".

Writing after the release of the Cass report, the leader in The Times opined that following Peach's death, "the Metropolitan Police entered a dark place from which they have been struggling to emerge ever since". In 2010 Andy Hayman, the former assistant commissioner for Specialist Operations at the Metropolitan Police, wrote that Peach's death brought the service and the SPG into disrepute. It led to an undermining of confidence in the police and "creat[ed] a distrust of officers that in some quarters, has proved difficult to shake off". The criminologists Chris Greer and Eugene McLaughlin considered Peach's death alongside the Metropolitan Police's actions in relation to the 1993 murder of Stephen Lawrence, the death of Jean Charles de Menezes in 2005, the botched 2006 Forest Gate raid and the death of Ian Tomlinson; they described the "succession of institutional scandals, cover-ups and botched investigations" that had tarnished the image of the service. Writing in the light of Tomlinson's death, Philip Johnston, a journalist with The Daily Telegraph, observed that Peach was one in a number of incidents where there had been unwarranted police aggression. Johnston wrote that while at the time of Peach's death many people would have sided with the police, that is no longer the case. "Many of those from the countryside who attended the Westminster rally against the ban on fox-hunting bear the scars of a brutal confrontation with the police, which changed their view of them for ever."

== Legacy ==
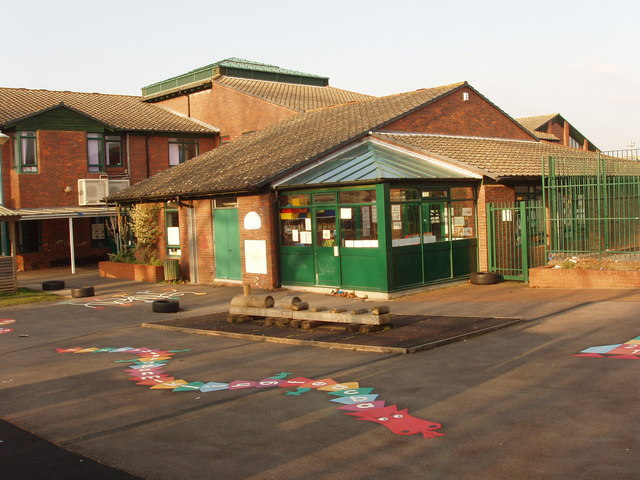
Blair Peach Primary School, Southall, in 2008

Public reaction to Peach's death, and other underlying racial tensions including excessive police use of the sus law, ultimately led to the 1981 Brixton riot and a public inquiry by Lord Scarman.

A primary school in Southall was later named after Peach. The Blair Peach Award was set up by the National Union of Teachers in 2010 to commemorate the former union member and as recognition of exemplary work by current members in schools and Union branches for equality and diversity issues. In 1989 the poet and activist Chris Searle edited One for Blair, an anthology of poems for the young.

The injury to Clarence Baker was commemorated in the Ruts's song "Jah War". The Two-Tone album The 2 Tone Story is dedicated to Peach's memory. Several songs have been written in Peach's memory, or referring to his death, including the Pop Group's 1980 song "Justice"; the 1982 song "Water of Dreams" by Ralph McTell; and "Reggae Fi Peach" by Linton Kwesi Johnson, which contains the lyrics:

The SPG them are murderers (murderers)
We can't make them get no furtherer
Cos they killed Blair Peach the teacher
Them killed Blair Peach, the dirty bleeders

Blair Peach was an ordinary man
Blair Peach he took a simple stand
Against the fascists and their wicked plans
So them beat him till him life was done

== See also ==
- Liddle Towers

== Notes and references ==
=== Sources ===
==== Books ====
- Baumann, Gerd (1996). Contesting Culture: Discourses of Identity in Multi-ethnic London. Cambridge: Cambridge University Press. ISBN 978-0-521-55554-8.
- Brah, Avtar (2005). Cartographies of Diaspora: Contesting Identities. London: Routledge. ISBN 978-1-134-80868-7.
- Brain, Timothy (2010). A History of Policing in England and Wales from 1974: A Turbulent Journey. Oxford University Press. ISBN 978-0-19-921866-0.
- Butler, David; King, Anthony (1965). The British General Election of 1964. London: Macmillan. ISBN 978-1-349-81741-2.
- Butler, David; King, Anthony (1966). The British General Election of 1966. London: Palgrave Macmillan. ISBN 978-1-349-00548-2.
- Butler, David; Pinto-Duschinsky, Michael (1971). The British General Election of 1970. London: Palgrave Macmillan. ISBN 978-1-349-01095-0.
- Conklin Frederking, Lauretta (2007). Economic and Political Integration in Immigrant Neighborhoods: Trajectories of Virtuous and Vicious Cycles. Cranbury, NJ: Susquehanna University Press. ISBN 978-1-57591-111-3.
- Cram, Ian (2016). Contested Words: Legal Restrictions on Freedom of Speech in Liberal Democracies. London: Routledge. ISBN 978-1-317-16030-4.
- Dummett, Michael (1980). The Death of Blair Peach: the Supplementary Report of the Unofficial Committee of Enquiry. London: National Council for Civil Liberties. ISBN 978-0-9011-0891-3.
- Gilroy, Paul (2004). "Police and Thieves". In Centre for Contemporary Cultural Studies (ed.). Empire Strikes Back: Race and Racism in 70's Britain. London: Routledge. pp. 141–180. ISBN 978-1-134-89702-5.
- Hammond Perry, Kennetta (2015). London is the Place for Me: Black Britons, Citizenship, and the Politics of Race. Oxford: Oxford University Press. ISBN 978-0-19-024020-2.
- Hann, Dave (2012). Physical Resistance: A Hundred Years of Anti-Fascism. Winchester: John Hunt Publishing. ISBN 978-1-7809-9177-1.
- Joyce, Peter (2010). Policing: Development and Contemporary Practice. London: SAGE Publications. ISBN 978-1-4462-4826-3.
- Joyce, Peter; Wain, Neil (2014). Palgrave Dictionary of Public Order Policing, Protest and Political Violence. London: Palgrave Macmillan UK. ISBN 978-1-137-27008-5.
- Kettle, Martin; Hodges, Lucy (1982). Uprising!: the Police, the People, and the Riots in Britain's Cities. London: Pan Books. ISBN 978-0-330-26845-5.
- Lynskey, Dorian (2012). 33 Revolutions Per Minute. London: Faber. ISBN 978-0-5712-4135-4.
- McNee, David (1983). McNee's Law. London: Collins. ISBN 978-0-0021-7007-9.
- Payne-James, Jason; Busuttil, Anthony; Smock, William (2003). Forensic Medicine: Clinical and Pathological Aspects. Cambridge: Cambridge University Press. ISBN 978-1-84110-026-5.
- Ransom, David (1980). The Blair Peach Case: Licence to Kill. London: Friends of Blair Peach Committee. ISBN 978-0-906224-04-5.
- Rollo, Joanna (1980). "The Special Patrol Group". In Hain, Peter (ed.). Policing the Police. London: John Calder. pp. 153–208. ISBN 978-0-7145-3795-5.
- Ryan, Mick (1996). Lobbying From Below: Inquest in Defence of Civil Liberties. London: Taylor & Francis Group. ISBN 978-1-85728-256-6.
- Samantrai, Ranu (2002). AlterNatives: Black Feminism in the Postimperial Nation. Stanford, CA: Stanford University Press. ISBN 978-0-8047-4321-1.
- Scraton, Phil; Gordon, Paul (1984). Causes for concern. London: Penguin. ISBN 978-0-1402-2464-1.
- Waddington, Peter (1994). Liberty and Order: Public Order Policing in a Capital City. London: UCL Press. ISBN 978-1-85728-226-9.
- Ward, Tony (1986). Death and disorder: Three Case Studies of Public Order and Policing in London. London: INQUEST. ISBN 978-0-946858-02-6.
- Waters, Rob (2018). Thinking Black: Britain, 1964–1985. Oakland, CA: University of California Press. ISBN 978-0-520-96720-5.

==== Official reports ====
- Cass, John (12 July 1979). Report of Commander Cass dated 12 July 1979 (Report). Metropolitan Police.
- Cass, John (14 September 1979). Report of Commander Cass dated 14 September 1979 (Report). Metropolitan Police.
- Cass, John (23 August 1999). Report of Commander Cass dated 23 August 1999 (Report). Metropolitan Police.
- Overview of the Southall demonstration, Investigating officers' reports into the death of Blair Peach and the decision of the then Director of Public Prosecutions (Report). Metropolitan Police. 24 April 1979.

==== Journals ====
- Davis, Bob (24 September 2009). "Going in by the front door: Searle, Earl Marshal School and Sheffield". Race & Class. 51 (2): 79–91. doi:10.1177/0306396809345578. S2CID 144977992.
- de Kauwe, Lalith (Spring 1980). "Southall—23rd April 1979". Bulletin (12): 13–16. JSTOR 44749659.
- Fox, Lynne (1995). "'Southall People' – Making an Exhibition of Themselves". Immigrants & Minorities. 14 (3): 304–307. doi:10.1080/02619288.1995.9974869.
- Greer, Chris; McLaughlin, Eugene (November 2010). "We Predict A Riot?: Public Order Policing, New Media Environments and the Rise of the Citizen Journalist". The British Journal of Criminology. 50 (6): 1041–1059. doi:10.1093/bjc/azq039. JSTOR 43610824.
- Greer, Chris; McLaughlin, Eugene (March 2012). "'This Is Not Justice': Ian Tomlinson, Institutional Failure and the Press Politics of Outrage" (PDF). The British Journal of Criminology. 52 (2): 274–293. doi:10.1093/bjc/azr086. JSTOR 44173489.
- Karapin, Roger (July 1999). "The Politics of Immigration Control in Britain and Germany: Subnational Politicians and Social Movements". Comparative Politics. 31 (4): 423–444. doi:10.2307/422238. JSTOR 422238. PMID 20120546.
- Manson, Hugo (19 April 1980). "The Killing of Blair Peach". New Zealand Listener: 14–15.
- May, Alex (2012). "Peach, (Clement) Blair (1946–1979)". Oxford Dictionary of National Biography (online ed.). Oxford University Press. doi:10.1093/ref:odnb/47730. (Subscription, Wikipedia Library access or UK public library membership required.)
- Renton, David (22 May 2014). "The Killing of Blair Peach". London Review of Books. 36 (10): 23–26. ISSN 0260-9592.
- Richman, Paula (March 1999). "A Diaspora Ramayana in Southall, Greater London". Journal of the American Academy of Religion. 67 (1): 33–57. doi:10.1093/jaarel/67.1.33. JSTOR 1466032.
- Wright, Niel (March 2008). "Dennis List: An Appreciation" (PDF). Ka Mate Ka Ora: A New Zealand Journal of Poetry and Poetics (5): 184–187.

==== News articles ====
- "25 police hurt in NF march". The Guardian. 22 April 1979. p. 1.
- "1979: Teacher dies in Southall race riots". BBC. 2008.
- "1980: Peach death was 'misadventure'". BBC. 2008.
- Alderson, Andrew (25 April 2010). "Uncomfortable reading' for the Met as Blair Peach documents go public". The Sunday Telegraph. p. 10.
- Anand, Jasbir (29 January 2019). "Southall riots: A personal reflection". Ealing News Extra. Archived from the original on 10 April 2019.
- Barling, Kurt (28 April 2009). "Southall Rising". BBC.
- "Blair Peach". Leader. The Times. 28 April 2010. p. 2.
- "Blair Peach death secrecy review". BBC. 25 June 2009.
- "Blair Peach inquest may set a record". The Times. 28 April 1980. p. 2.
- "The Blair Peach killing: Top yard men urged charges". The Sunday Times. 16 March 1980. p. 1.
- "Blair Peach: Now the SPG men will testify". The Guardian. 11 May 1980. p. 4.
- Chaudhary, Vivek (4 April 2018). "How London's Southall became 'Little Punjab'". The Guardian.
- Chippindale, Peter; Ballantyne, Aileen (24 April 1979). "Teacher dies in Front clashes". The Guardian. p. 1.
- Deeley, Peter (29 April 1979). "Southhall claims refuted". The Observer. pp. 1–2.
- Evans, Martin (28 April 2010). "Blair Peach Inspector denies responsibility". The Daily Telegraph.
- Evans, Rob (6 May 2021). "Met spied on partner of Blair Peach for more than two decades, inquiry hears". The Guardian.
- Ford, Richard (28 April 2010a). "Riot police did kill Blair Peach". The Times. p. 4.
- Ford, Richard (1 May 2010b). "Dignity of woman who waited for the truth about Blair Peach". The Times. p. 37.
- Fresco, Adam (10 April 2009). "Officer suspended over G20 death as second post-mortem is held". The Times. p. 7.
- Hayman, Andy (28 April 2010). "Riot police did kill Blair Peach". The Times. p. 4.
- Hughes, Mark; Milmo, Cahal (28 April 2010). "How a riot in Southall became a symbol of police corruption". The Independent. p. 16.
- Johnston, Philip (9 April 2009). "We want a police force, not brute force; Ian Tomlinson's death was a tragedy. What is worse is that, once again, the police misled us about what happened". The Daily Telegraph. p. 27.
- "Law Report: Statements to be disclosed in police complaint". The Times. 5 February 1986. p. 25.
- Leigh, David (16 November 1979). "Blair Peach family loses jury inquest plea". The Guardian. p. 28.
- Lewis, Paul (13 June 2009a). "Partner of man killed by Met officers calls for investigation to be made public". The Guardian.
- Lewis, Paul (3 October 2009b). "Secret Met inquiry into death of Blair Peach revealed: Family of teacher killed at protest unaware of review: Scotland Yard commander reopened file 10 years ago". The Guardian. p. 12.
- Lewis, Paul (22 January 2010a). "Secret document which implicated Blair Peach coroner withheld by Home Office". The Guardian.
- Lewis, Paul (27 April 2010b). "Blair Peach killed by police at 1979 protest, Met report finds". The Guardian.
- Lewis, Paul (27 April 2010c). "Blair Peach: After 31 years Met police say 'sorry' for their role in his killing". The Guardian.
- Lewis, Paul (28 April 2010d). "Blair Peach: Met inquiry: Ian Tomlinson death was catalyst in report's release". The Guardian. p. 5.
- "The life of Blair Peach". The Guardian. 16 July 1979. p. 11.
- Marshall, Peter (13 October 2009). "Blair Peach 'prime suspect' speaks out". BBC.
- "National Front fields almost 300 candidates". The Guardian. 19 April 1979. p. 6.
- Oates, Jonathan (29 January 2019). "Southall riots: 23 April 1979". Ealing News Extra. Archived from the original on 17 November 2020.
- Pallister, David (25 May 1979a). "Peach death file for DPP". The Guardian. p. 2.
- Pallister, David (14 June 1979b). "Testimony to a fallen comrade and friend". The Guardian. p. 14.
- Pallister, David (4 October 1979c). "Anger at DPP's decision on Peach death". The Guardian. p. 28.
- Pallister, David (12 October 1979d). "Inquest told 'Blair was beaten in police truncheon charge'". The Guardian. p. 2.
- Parry, Gareth (27 April 1979). "Police equipment not adequate, says union". The Guardian. p. 4.
- Parry, Gareth; Chippindale, Peter (25 April 1979). "Dead man known to Front by sight". The Guardian. p. 2.
- "PC hid his cosh 'in panic' before search". The Guardian. 15 May 1980. p. 4.
- Peach, Giles (29 April 2010). "We don't want an apology for my uncle. Just the truth". The Times. p. 24.
- "Peach application". The Times. 10 June 1988. p. 2.
- "Policeman injured in Front clashes". The Guardian. 21 April 1979. p. 24.
- Puri, Kavita (5 August 2015). "The pool of blood that changed my life". BBC.
- Singer, Angela (15 December 1979). "Denning rules Peach inquest must have jury". The Guardian. p. 24.
- Stubbs, Celia (14 June 2009). "Lessons from the death of Blair Peach". The Guardian.
- Symon, Penny (15 December 1979). "Blair Peach inquest to be held before a jury after ruling by Court of Appeal". The Times. p. 1.
- Timmins, Nicholas (22 April 1980a). "Peach group name police on 'wanted' poster". The Times. p. 1.
- Timmins, Nicholas (28 May 1980b). "Tighter police control urged in Peach misadventure verdict". The Times. pp. 1–2.
- "A Verdict of Misadventure with Riders". Leader. The Times. 28 May 1980. p. 15.

==== Internet and audio visual media ====
- The 2 Tone Story (Liner notes). Chrysalis Records. 1989. 353 657.
- "Blair Peach Award". National Union of Teachers. Archived from the original on 11 April 2019.
- "Blair Peach Gravestone". Getty Images. 9 January 2017. Archived from the original on 8 May 2019.
- "Blair Peach Primary School". Ealing Council.
- Clark, Gregory (2023). "The Annual RPI and Average Earnings for Britain, 1209 to Present (New Series)". MeasuringWorth. Archived from the original on 1 April 2023.
- Fisher, Devon (15 March 2016). "The Pop Group: For How Much Longer Do We Tolerate Mass Murder?". Pop Matters.
- "History of the Metropolitan Police: Special Patrol Group". Metropolitan Police Service. Archived from the original on 15 August 2012.
- McTell, Ralph. "Water of Dreams".
- "Reggae Fi Peach". Shazam.
- Searle, Chris (23 April 1979). "Remembering Blair Peach: 30 Years On". Institute of Race Relations. Archived from the original on 16 November 2018.
- "Southall, April 1979: How to fight the fascists and win (then and now)". Birkbeck, University of London.
- "Territorial Support Group". Metropolitan Police Service. Archived from the original on 12 April 2009.
