= Dennis List =

New Zealand writer

Dennis List (1946 – 9 November 2007) was a New Zealand poet, editor and novelist.

List was born in Wellington to a professional family whose name was originally Liszt but grew up in Rotorua. He became a student at Victoria University of Wellington in 1964 and quickly gained prominence as a writer and editor. His work appeared in Argot, Experiment, Frogslegs, Salient, Poetry Broadsheet, NZ University Arts Festival Yearbook, Poetry New Zealand and other literary magazines.

His first book of poems, A Kitset of 26 Poems, appeared in London in 1972. It was followed by Pathways into the Brain (1973) and Falling Off Chairs (1996), both published in New Zealand. He featured in The Young New Zealand Poets (1973). His poetry is prominently represented in the anthology Big Smoke: New Zealand Poems 1960-1975 (2000). In 2000, nine of his poems were printed in the Alsop Review, an online poetry magazine in the United States.

In 1965, List became a co-editor (with his flatmates Blair Peach and David Rutherford) of the Argot magazine, which had a leading role as an experimental literary magazine. He later edited and largely wrote the first two New Zealand Whole Earth Catalogues.

In 1979, List and his family migrated to Australia, where he became head of market research for the ABC, operating out of Adelaide. He took redundancy from the ABC in 1998 and became a freelance marketing guru, making several trips to Southeast Asia and Africa for the Swedish Aid organisation and published major marketing guides.

He took up a South Australian government scholarship to do a PhD at the University of South Australia, which he completed in 2006. He was made head of the market research department at the University of Adelaide, having already established an international reputation in Futures Studies.

In the latter part of his life, List worked on a dozen novels, six completed. His first comic fantasy novel The Return of the Triboldies was published serially in the Victoria University student newspaper Salient in 1968 and reprinted in 1996. He completed three novels in a series, with each one set in a different Australian state and New Zealand: Midnight Deli (1993), Gone: No Address (1994) and Cloud of Universal Light (1999–2006) as well as two other novels, Dromeworld (1997) and Lear on Limbo (1997–2006).

Dennis List died in Adelaide on 9 November 2007.
