= Southall Town Hall =

Municipal building in London, England

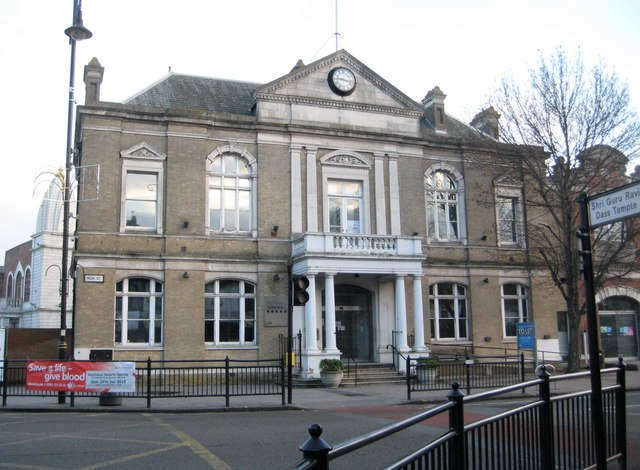
- Southall Town Hall

- Shown in Ealing
- 51.5113°N 0.3752°W
- Location: Southall

History
- Built: 1898

Site notes
- Architect: Thomas Newall
- Architectural style: Classical style

Southall Town Hall is a municipal building in High Street, Southall, London. It has been designated a local heritage asset.

== History ==
In 1878, the vestry, which had not previously been active, was instructed to find a permanent home for its meetings. After the area became an urban district as Southall-Norwood Urban District Council in 1894, this need for a permanent home became more pressing and the vestry board decided to procure purpose-built council offices in the High Street: the site they selected was open land owned by the Earl of Jersey.

The foundation stone for the new building was laid by the Countess of Jersey on 8 November 1897. It was designed by Thomas Newall in the classical style, built by C.F. Kearley of Uxbridge and was completed in 1898. The design involved a symmetrical main frontage with five bays facing onto the High Street; the central section featured a tetrastyle porch with Doric order columns on the ground floor and there was a window with a balcony flanked by Doric order pilasters on the first floor with a pediment containing a clock above. The principal room was the council chamber on the first floor.

The building became the headquarters of the Municipal Borough of Southall in 1936 but ceased to function as the local seat of government when the enlarged London Borough of Ealing was formed in 1965. It subsequently operated as a training and enterprise centre. In April 1979, Blair Peach, a New Zealand teacher and anti-racism campaigner, died after being hit on the head, probably by a member of the Special Patrol Group (SPG), a specialist unit within the Metropolitan Police Service, during a riot outside the town hall.

In 2017, the council decided to dispose of a long leasehold interest in the town hall to the Vishwa Hindu Kendra temple, which is based just north of the hall. However, after the High Court decided in July 2018 that the council had acted unlawfully and unreasonably in trying to sell the building, the council decided in September 2018 not to appeal.
