= Richard Clutterbuck =

Major-General Richard Clutterbuck CB OBE
- Born: 22 November 1917
- Died: 6 January 1998 (aged 80)

Major-General Richard Lewis Clutterbuck CB OBE (22 November 1917 – 6 January 1998) was a British Army officer and engineer who later became a pioneer in the study of political violence.

== Career ==
Clutterbuck attended Radley College in Oxfordshire and the Royal Military Academy, Woolwich, before graduating with a degree in mechanical sciences (engineering) from Pembroke College, Cambridge, in 1939. In August 1937 he was commissioned second lieutenant in the Royal Engineers. After Dunkirk, he went through both the Western Desert and Italian campaigns. The army sent Clutterbuck to different hotspots, including Palestine (1947) during the Irgun Zvei Leumi's terrorist campaign. In 1956, up against Chinese communists, Clutterbuck shed his rank badges to go on patrol as an ordinary soldier. As chief engineer Far East, 1966–68, Brigadier Clutterbuck put into practice in northeast Thailand the counter-terrorist philosophy he was gradually evolving. His next job after Thailand was as Engineer-in-Chief (1968–70) at the Ministry of Defence. While in the Far East he had started to read for a PhD in politics. In 1968, he enrolled at the University of London.

His last army post was back in the specialisation he had created for himself, as chief army instructor of the Royal College of Defence Studies, devoted to peacekeeping or "low-intensity operations" as they were now termed. His Who's Who entry gave his recreations as "sailing, canoeing and the study of revolution". On retirement in 1972 he received his PhD, and became a lecturer in political conflict at the University of Exeter.

Nicholas Shakespeare reports that Clutterbuck's secret visits to Lima, Peru in the early 1990s transformed police and army operations against the Sendero Luminoso when the organisation appeared on the verge of overthrowing the government. His advice that a forensic rather than militaristic approach be taken to counter-terrorist operations was successfully applied by police chiefs such as General Antonio Ketin Vidal and led directly to the arrest of Abimael Guzman, leader of the Senderistas, and the winding up of his organisation.

== Publications ==
- Across the River (as Richard Jocelyn), 1957;
- The Long Long War, 1966;
- Protest and the Urban Guerrilla, 1973;
- Riot and Revolution in Singapore and Malaya, 1973;
- Living with Terrorism, 1975;
- Guerrillas and Terrorists, 1977;
- Britain in Agony, 1978, (revised edition 1980);
- Kidnap and Ransom, 1978;
- The Media and Political Violence, 1981, (revised edition 1983);
- Industrial Conflict and Democracy, 1984;
- Conflict and Violence in Singapore and Malaysia, 1985;
- The Future of Political Violence, 1986;
- Kidnap, Hijack and Extortion, 1987;
- Terrorism and Guerrilla Warfare, 1990;
- Terrorism, Drugs and Crime in Europe after 1992, 1990;
- International Crisis and Conflict, 1993;
- Terrorism in an Unstable World, 1994;
- Drugs, Crime and Corruption, 1995,
- Public Safety and Civil Liberties, 1997
- Families, Drugs and Crime, 1998 (published posthumously)
