= Phil Scraton =

British academic

- Born: 3 May 1949 (age 77); Wallasey, Wirral, Cheshire, England
- Awards: Freedom of the City of Liverpool (2016)

Academic background
- Education: Ushaw College; Wallasey College of FE
- Alma mater: University of Liverpool (BA, MA) Lancaster University (PhD)
- Thesis: Unreasonable Force: Class, Marginality and the Political Autonomy of the Police (1989)

Academic work
- Discipline: Criminology
- Institutions: Open University; Edge Hill University; Queen's University Belfast
- Notable works: Hillsborough: The Report of the Independent Panel; Hillsborough: The Truth; Power, Conflict and Criminalisation

Phil Scraton (born 3 May 1949) is an English criminologist, academic and author. He is a social researcher, known particularly for his investigative work into the context, circumstances and aftermath of the 1989 Hillsborough disaster. More recently, he was a member of the Hillsborough Independent Panel and headed its research. Currently he is professor emeritus, School of Law at Queen's University Belfast, and formerly Director of the Childhood, Transition and Social Justice Initiative.

His research includes the investigation of and inquiry into controversial deaths, most notably the Hillsborough disaster on 15 April 1989 in which 97 football fans were crushed to death. He has also researched deaths in custody, the marginalisation and criminalisation of children and young people, the politics of imprisonment, and the analysis of disasters and their impact on the bereaved and survivors.

== Early life and education ==
Phil Scraton was born in 1949 in Wallasey, Wirral, Cheshire (now Merseyside)) and moved to Liverpool in the late 1960s. Brought up a Roman Catholic, he attended Sacred Heart Primary School, Moreton, and was a seminarian at Ushaw College, Durham, from 1962 to 1968. Soon after leaving the seminary, he rejected religion. Completing school at Wallasey College of Further Education, he studied sociology at the University of Liverpool, gaining a BA degree and an MA degree by research. His master's thesis, Images of Deviance and Politics of Assimilation, examined State institutionalised racism against the Irish Travelling community in Liverpool. His doctoral thesis, Unreasonable Force: Class, Marginality and the Political Autonomy of the Police, was awarded by Lancaster University and focused on policing in the context of the United Kingdom's inner city disturbances in the early 1980s and the 1984–1985 coal dispute. A qualified teacher, he holds an Advanced Diploma in Outdoor Education. In December 2016, he received an honorary Doctor of Laws degree from the University of Liverpool. In July 2018, he was awarded honorary doctorates by Edge Hill University and Lancaster University.

== Career ==
In 1979, Phil Scraton joined the Open University's academic staff as a member of the 'Crime, Justice and Society' course team, contributing also to the Social Sciences' Foundation Course. In 1984 at Edge Hill College, with Kathryn Chadwick, he established the Centre for Studies in Crime and Social Justice, developing the university's first Masters and Doctoral programmes. Promoted to Professor in 1990 he remained Director of the centre until 2003. In 2000 he was awarded a Nuffield grant to set up a disasters' research archive and to examine the aftermath of disasters and other traumatising events. In 2001 he and Kathryn Chadwick were awarded an ESRC Seminars Award to hold six two-day seminars on the theme Disasters: Origins, Consequences, Aftermath bringing together researchers, practitioners, campaigners, bereaved and survivors. A member of the Young People, Power and Justice collective, he edited its collection Childhood' in 'Crisis? (UCL Press/ Routledge 1997). In September 2003, he was appointed to a chair in Criminology in the School of Law at Queen's University, Belfast. He has held visiting scholarships at the University of Western Sydney, Monash University Melbourne and the University of Sydney. In 2013 he was awarded a Lowenstein Fellowship at Amherst College, Massachusetts. In 2014 he was Visiting Fellow at the University of Central Lancashire and in 2016 at the University of Auckland, New Zealand and at the University of New South Wales, Sydney, Australia. He is the all-Ireland representative for the European Group for the Study of Deviance and Social Control.

His first book, a co-edited collection with Paul Gordon, was published by Penguin in 1984: Causes for Concern: British criminal justice on trial. Soon after he edited a special edition of the international Journal of Law and Society entitled: The State v. the People: Lessons from the Coal Dispute (1985). He is author of The State of the Police (Pluto 1985) and co-author (with Kathryn Chadwick) of In the Arms of the Law: Coroners' Inquests and Deaths in Custody (Pluto 1987) and, with Joe Sim and Paula Skidmore, Prisons Under Protest (Open University Press 1991) and editor of Law, Order and the Authoritarian State (Open University Press 1987). He co-authored, with Howard Davis, Beyond Disaster: Identifying and Resolving Inter-Agency Conflict in the Immediate Aftermath of Disasters (HO Emergency Planning Division 1997). The first edition of Hillsborough: The Truth (Mainstream) was published in 1999 (2nd edn 2000; 3rd edn 2009; 4th edn Penguin/Random House 2016).

More recently, alongside his work on Hillsborough, he published Power, Conflict and Criminalisation (Routledge, 2007) a book that covers the full range of his critical research. This was followed by a collection of research writing on prisons, The Violence of Incarceration (Routledge, 2009), co-edited with Jude McCulloch. With co-researchers Siobhan McAlister and Deena Haydon, he co-authored Childhood in Transition: Experiencing Marginalisation and Conflict in Northern Ireland (Save the Children/ The Prince's Trust, 2009). His research with Linda Moore for the Northern Ireland Human Rights Commission into women's imprisonment was published initially by the Commission in two extensive reports, The Hurt Inside (2005) and The Prison Within (2007), followed by the text, The Incarceration of Women: Punishing Bodies, Breaking Spirits (Palgrave Macmillan, 2014). With Linda Moore and Azrini Wahidin he co-edited Women’s Imprisonment and the Case for Abolition (Routledge, 2017). He edited special issues of Social Justice: Journal of Crime, Conflict and World Order (with Jude McCulloch 2006) on Deaths in Custody and Detention and Current Issues in Criminal Justice on the criminalisation and punishment of children and young people (2008).

In 2013, in partnership with Siobhán McAlister, he was awarded ESRC Knowledge Exchange funding for the project Identifying and Challenging the Negative Media Representation of Children and Young People in Northern Ireland. The project, in collaboration with Include Youth and a range of other children's and young people's rights charitable organisations, appointed Faith Gordon as Research Fellow. An initial summary of research findings, Behind the Headlines; Media Representations of Children and Young People in Northern Ireland – The voices and experiences of children and young people was published in April 2015. His recent research also includes the European funded international comparative project Children of Imprisoned Parents.

He was a member of the "Hillsborough Independent Panel" (2010–2012) and primary author of Hillsborough: The Report of the Independent Panel (2012) https://assets.publishing.service.gov.uk/government/uploads/system/uploads/attachment_data/file/229038/0581.pdf In 2017 he was awarded a Leverhulme Fellowship to research the project:‘"Justice for the 96": From Campaign Mantra to Due Process'.

He is author/ editor of ′I Am Sir, You Are A Number': Report of the Independent Panel of Inquiry into the Circumstances of the H-Block and Armagh Prison Protests 1976-1981 (Coiste na nIarchimí, 2020) https://www.statewatch.org/media/1396/ni-report-inquiry-h-block-armagh-prison-protests-10-20.pdf and co-author, with Gillian McNaull, of Death Investigation, Coroners' Inquests and the Rights of the Bereaved (Irish Council for Civil Liberties, 2021) https://www.iccl.ie/report/iccl-report-on-the-coroners-system/

In 2021, with Dr Maeve O'Rourke and Deirdre Mahon he was appointed to the three person Truth Recovery Design Panel to work with survivors and victims of Mother and Baby Institutions, Magdalene Laundries and Workhouses in Northern Ireland. Their extensive report, Truth, Acknowledgement and Accountability (Report for the NI Executive) presented five primary and 87 secondary recommendations, accepted in full by all parties in the Northern Ireland Assembly. The recommendations include an independent panel informing a full statutory public inquiry overseen by victims and survivors, supported by an independent research team. This unprecedented truth investigation will be the first integrated, fully-funded process of its kind ensuring that families will have open access to all institutional records alongside schemes for redress, reparation and memorialization.

In 2022 he headed the five-person team that researched and authored ′″Treated With Contempt″: An Independent Panel Report into Fans' Experiences Before, During and After the 2022 Champions League Final in Paris′ (with Dr Deena Haydon, Dr Lucy Easthope, Dr Patricia Canning and Peter Marshall). Based on the testimonies of 485 witnesses and journalists its 52 key findings found serious and sustained failure in crowd management and safety; fans placed in sustained collective danger though negligent mismanagement, poor stewarding, hostile policing, indiscriminate use of tear gas, and criminal assaults by local gangs and paramilitary-style police. It found that all UEFA's key guidelines on stadium safety were compromised by egregious failures in managing and policing the event (see: https://law.qub.ac.uk/schools/SchoolofLaw/filestore/Filetoupload,1530449,en.pdf )

He is a founder member of INQUEST, United Campaigns for Justice, and a member of the Statewatch Editorial Collective. He was chair of the Board of Include Youth 2006–2013. He became an Include Youth Patron in 2021. In November 2017 he featured as a 'castaway' on BBC Radio 4's Desert Island Discs https://www.bbc.co.uk/programmes/b09cvytz followed in 2018 by similar excursions on BBC's Radio Scotland and Radio Ulster!

=== Awards ===
In 2012–13, Scraton received the Queen's University Vice-Chancellor's inaugural award for research impact.[8] In 2013 his research was runner-up in the Times Higher Educational Supplement's Research Project of the Year award.

In September 2016 he was awarded the Freedom of the City of Liverpool for his long-term work, spanning three decades, supporting the families' campaign for justice. Two months later, along with Margaret Aspinall, Chair of the Hillsborough Independent Panel, he was awarded Campaigner of the Year by the Political Studies Association.

In December 2016 he declined an OBE in the 2017 New Year Honours list stating that he 'could not receive an honour on the recommendation of those who remained unresponsive to the determined efforts of bereaved families and survivors to secure truth and justice'. He also stated that in his 'scholarship and teaching' he is 'a strong critic of the historical, cultural and political contexts of imperialism and their international legacy' and proposed that people's contribution to society should not be connected to 'British Empire'.

== Hillsborough disaster research ==
The Hillsborough disaster occurred on 15 April 1989 at the Hillsborough Stadium in Sheffield, England. During the FA Cup semi-final match between Liverpool and Nottingham Forest football clubs, a human crush resulted in the deaths of 97 people and injuries to 766 others. In the immediate aftermath Scraton received funding from Liverpool City Council to establish the Hillsborough Project to ensure external, independent scrutiny of the investigations and inquiries following the disaster.

=== The Hillsborough Project ===
Funded in 1989 for three years the Project was based at Edge Hill University. It published two major reports, Coleman, S., Jemphrey, A., Scraton, P and Skidmore, P Hillsborough and After: The Liverpool Experience (Liverpool City Council, 1990) and Scraton, P., Jemphrey, A and Coleman, S No Last Rights: The Denial of Justice and the Promotion of Myth in the Aftermath of the Hillsborough Disaster (Alden Press/ Liverpool City Council, 1995).

The latter was a 375-page analysis of the legal procedures, including the first inquests, and the media from the immediate aftermath onward. It exposed and condemned the institutional structures and operational procedures, from the investigation of Hillsborough through to the accidental death verdicts. The authors argued that the outcome had constituted a 'grave miscarriage of justice, denying the bereaved their rights.

The same investigating officers had served all three inquiries into Hillsborough thus compromising their independence, the families did not receive legal aid and had limited disclosure of evidence. The report revealed a range of other systemic failings, most significant being the Coroner's imposition of a 3.15pm cut-off on evidence – a time when some who died were still alive. Effectively this inhibited examination of evidence relating to the effectiveness of the rescue and treatment of the fans. It presented 87 recommendations for handling the aftermath and legal processes following disasters.

=== Stuart-Smith Scrutiny ===
In 1997 the newly elected Labour Government established an unprecedented judicial scrutiny of all documentation pertaining to the disaster and its aftermath. It was headed by Lord Justice Stuart-Smith. Scraton attended personal hearings with several families and made three extensive submissions to the Scrutiny including his disclosure of the 'review and alteration' of police officers' statements. At the time had accessed and researched all police statements in their original and altered form in the House of Lords Reading Room. Stuart-Smith concluded that the reviewed and altered statements had no significant impact on the legal processes or their outcomes. He stated he was 'satisfied that Lord Taylor's Inquiry team were in no way inhibited or impeded by the exclusion of material from the original statements' and that 'the allegation made by Professor Scraton of irregularity and malpractice is not substantiated'. Scraton was highly critical of the Stuart-Smith scrutiny, describing its lack of rigour as a "debacle".

=== Hillsborough: The Truth ===
Scraton's book Hillsborough: The Truth is now widely accepted as a definitive account of the disaster and its aftermath. The book focuses on the inadequacies of the police investigations, official inquiries and inquests, revealing the extent of the systemic review and alteration of South Yorkshire Police statements. It also details the treatment of the bereaved and survivors in the immediate aftermath of the disaster, and the "inhumanity" of the body identification process. At the time of its first edition (1999), the book was described by Liverpool playwright Jimmy McGovern as a "brilliant achievement" and The Independent stated that it told "a scarcely believable story of incompetence and mendacity". Two new editions were published, in 2000 (following the private prosecution of two senior officers), and 2009 (detailing the previous decade's campaign for justice). Reflecting on the work of the Hillsborough Independent Panel, a fourth edition was about to be published in 2014 when, at the new inquests into the deaths of the (at the time) 96, the Coroner imposed stringent 'contempt of court' regulations on publications and broadcasting. Following the conclusion of the inquests in mid-June 2016 a revised fourth edition was published, including three new chapters on the work of the Panel, its political impact and the new inquests.

=== Hillsborough Independent Panel ===
Following the 20th anniversary of the disaster in 2009 and the intervention of the then Minister of State for Culture, Andy Burnham, the Labour Government committed to the full disclosure of all available documents relating to Hillsborough, appointing the Hillsborough Independent Panel to manage the process of the disclosure, conduct research into all released documents and publish a comprehensive report explaining the Panel's work and how its findings added to public understanding of the context, circumstances and aftermath of the disaster. Scraton was appointed as a Panel member, led its research team based at Queen's University Belfast, and was primary author of the Panel's report. The detailed, 400 page Report delivered 153 key findings in 11 comprehensive chapters. It revealed the full extent of institutional failings that led to the disaster, their contribution to the tragic events as they unfolded and the full extent of the failures in investigation and inquiry that followed. This included the purposeful review and alteration of police statements by the South Yorkshire Police, first disclosed in the 1999 edition of Hillsborough: The Truth, and also the in-house alteration of South Yorkshire Ambulance Service statements.

Speaking in October 2012, Scraton said the findings of the Hillsborough Independent Panel – which also disclosed that 41 of the (at the time) 96 who died had the potential to survive had there been a more effective response to the emergency – showed "just how wrong he (LJ Stuart-Smith) was." The Panel's Report is available on-line, live linked to the Hillsborough Panel's archive.

In the wake of the Report's publication, Scraton was commended in Parliament by Andy Burnham, Shadow Health Secretary, as contributing, 'a huge service not just to the Hillsborough families but to this country'. He anticipated that the unique research 'approach, with the emphasis on disclosure, not adversarial argument, [provides] a model for resolving other contested issues arising from our past'. The Report's findings led directly to: the quashing of the 96 inquest verdicts of 'accidental death' and the ordering of new inquests by the Attorney General; a full investigation by the Independent Police Complaints Authority; and a full criminal investigation.

In 2013 Sir John Goldring was appointed as Assistant Coroner for South Yorkshire and West Yorkshire to conduct the new inquests. In late March 2014, following five preliminary hearings, the new inquests were convened before a jury in a converted office block on Birchwood Industrial Estate, Warrington. On 26 April 2016 the jury returned a majority verdict of unlawful killing in respect of the then 96 victims. In its narrative verdict the jury made 25 criticisms of the public authorities and private organisations involved, the majority against the South Yorkshire Police. Throughout the longest inquests in legal history, two years, Scraton was seconded to the Hillsborough families' legal teams.

=== Hillsborough films ===
Scraton's research contributed significantly to the ESPN/ BBC two-hour documentary, Hillsborough, directed and produced by Dan Gordon. It was shown internationally in 2014 to widespread acclaim, and was short-listed for an EMMY. The following year, it won Most Outstanding Factual Program at the Australian ASTRA awards. Updated after the verdicts of the new inquests, it was released in May 2016 and broadcast on BBC2, receiving excellent reviews and a massive public response. In 2017 it won the Writers' and Broadcasters' Guild Award for Best Factual Documentary and in May 2017 it won the BAFTA for Best Single Documentary. His work also contributed significantly to the S4C/Rondo Productions documentary Hillsborough: Yr Hunllef Hir winning the Celtic Film Festival 'Spirit of the Festival' Award in 2018.
