= Martin Walker (reporter) =

British journalist

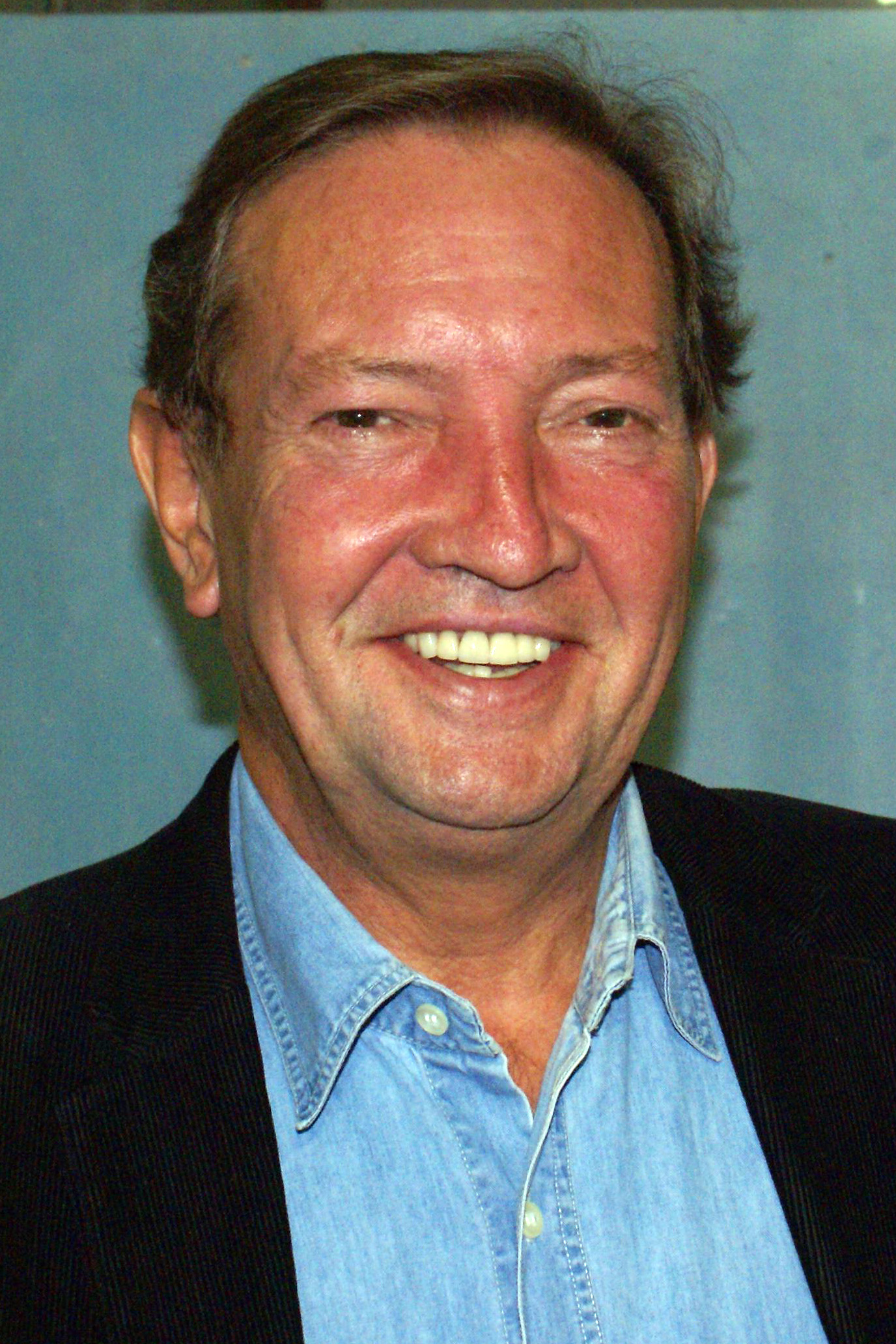
- Born: 1947 (age 78–79); Scotland, UK
- Occupations: Reporter and novelist
- Writing career
- Period: 1971–present
- Genres: Non-fiction (history), crime fiction

Martin Walker (born 1947) is a Scottish former journalist, historian, and the author of the popular Bruno series of detective novels. After working at The Guardian from 1971 to 1999, Walker joined United Press International (UPI) in 2000 as an international correspondent in Washington, D.C., and is now editor-in-chief emeritus of UPI. He was a member of A.T. Kearney's Global Business Policy Council.

== Life ==
Martin Walker was educated at Harrow County School for Boys and Balliol College, Oxford. He lives in the Périgord/Dordogne in Southern France with his wife with whom he has two daughters.

Walker was on the staff of The Guardian from around 1971, working in a variety of positions, including bureau chief in Moscow and the United States, European editor, and assistant editor. One of the unsuccessful candidates for the editorship of The Guardian in 1995, when Alan Rusbridger was appointed in succession to Peter Preston, Walker resigned in 1999 after 28 years with the newspaper.

Walker joined United Press International (UPI) in 2000. While at UPI he was also an international correspondent. He is now editor-in-chief emeritus of UPI. He also holds a variety of other positions, including senior scholar at the Woodrow Wilson International Center for Scholars in Washington, D.C.; senior fellow of the World Policy Institute at The New School in New York; member of the board of directors of the Global Panel Foundation (Berlin, Copenhagen, Prague, Sydney and Toronto). He is also a contributing editor of the Los Angeles Times's Opinion section and of Europe magazine. Walker also is a regular commentator on CNN, Inside Washington and NPR.

== Works ==
Walker has written several non-fiction books, including The National Front, Waking Giant: Gorbachev and Perestroika, The Cold War: A History, Clinton: The President They Deserve and America Reborn.

He's also written the historical thriller, The Caves of Perigord (2002).

=== Bruno, Chief of Police ===
Walker is the author of the Bruno detective series set in the Périgord region of France, where he has a home. The novels depict an unconventional village policeman, Benoît "Bruno" Courrèges, a passionate cook and former soldier who was wounded on a peacekeeping mission in the Balkans, who never carries his official gun, and who has "long since lost the key to his handcuffs".

==== Novels ====
1. Bruno, Chief of Police. Quercus, London 2008, ISBN 978-1-84724-507-6
2. The Dark Vineyard. Quercus, London 2009, ISBN 978-1-84724-915-9
3. Black Diamond. Quercus, London 2010, ISBN 978-0-85738-053-1
4. The Crowded Grave. Quercus, London 2011, ISBN 978-1-84916-321-7
5. The Devil's Cave. Quercus, London 2012, ISBN 978-1-78087-068-7
6. The Resistance Man. Quercus, London 2013, ISBN 978-1-78087-072-4
7. Children of War. Quercus, London 2014, ISBN 978-1-84866-402-9 (US title: The Children Return)
8. The Dying Season. Quercus, London 2015, ISBN 978-1-84866-405-0 (US title: The Patriarch)
9. Fatal Pursuit. Quercus, London 2016, ISBN 978-1-78429-457-1
10. The Templars' Last Secret. Quercus, London 2017, ISBN 978-1-78429-466-3
11. A Taste for Vengeance Knopf, New York 2018, ISBN 978-0-52551-996-6
12. The Body in the Castle Well. Knopf, New York 2019, ISBN 978-0-52551-998-0
13. The Shooting at Chateau Rock. Knopf, New York 2020, ISBN 9780525656654
14. The Coldest Case. Knopf, New York 2021, ISBN 9780525656678
15. To Kill a Troubadour. Knopf, New York 2022, ISBN 9780593319796
16. A Chateau Under Siege. Knopf, New York 2023, ISBN 9780593319819
17. A Grave in the Woods. Quercus, London 2024, ISBN 9781529428285
18. An Enemy in the Village. Quercus, London 2025, ISBN 9781529428339
19. A Murder in Springtime. Knopf, New York 2026, ISBN 979-8-217-20796-1

==== Short stories ====
- "Bruno and the Carol Singers". Vintage, New York 2012, ISBN 9780385350310
- "A Market Tale". Vintage, New York 2014, ISBN 9781101873977
- "The Chocolate War". Vintage, New York 2018, ISBN 9780525564539
- "A Birthday Lunch". Knopf, New York 2019, ISBN 9781984897640
- "Oystercatcher". Vintage, New York 2020, ISBN 9780593311400
- Bruno's Challenge and Other Stories of the French Countryside. Knopf, New York 2022, ISBN 9780593534229 (short stories collection)

== Prizes ==
- 2021: Prix Charbonnier
