= Kay Beauchamp =

British communist activist (1899–1992)

Kathleen Mary 'Kay' Beauchamp (27 May 1899 – 25 January 1992) was a leading light in the Communist Party of Great Britain in the 1920s. She helped found The Daily Worker (later The Morning Star) and was a local councillor in Finsbury.

== Biography ==
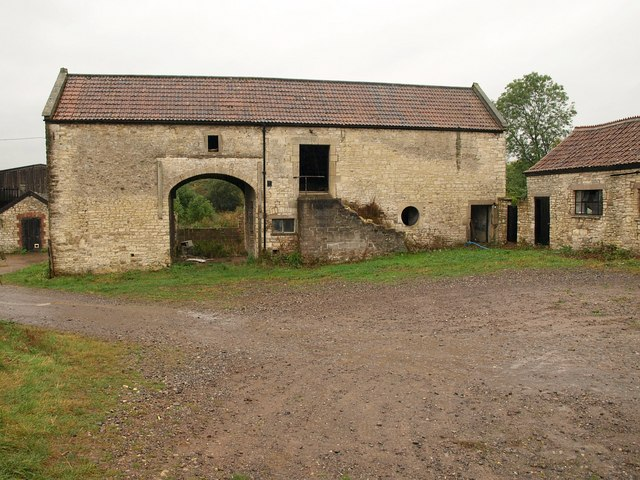
Welton Manor Farm, Midsomer Norton, where she grew up

She was born to a farming family at Welton Manor Farm, Midsomer Norton, Somerset on 27 May 1899. She was sister of Joan Beauchamp, later Joan Thompson, who became a prominent suffragette and associate of Sylvia Pankhurst. The family was part of the Beauchamp family that dominated the Somerset coalfield, her father being the cousin of Sir Frank Beauchamp and Louis Beauchamp who owned coalmines in the area. Her mother died in 1904 when Kay was only four.

She completed a degree in history at University College, London in 1924. In that year she married bookseller and bibliographer Graham Pollard, son of Professor Albert Pollard.

She joined the Communist Party and was one of the eight Party members who produced the first ever edition of The Daily Worker (later The Morning Star), which appeared on 1 January 1930. As its Managing Director she was jailed for contempt of court when the paper described the conviction of Wal Hannington, an unemployed workers' leader, as a "frame-up". She did not pay the associated fine and ended up spending five months in prison.

She worked as a teacher and was involved with the Communist Party's Education Department. During the 1930s and 1940s, she worked closely with Harry Pollitt, organising hunger marches, solidarity work for the Spanish Civil War and the campaign for the Second Front in World War II.

After the war, she was elected a local Councillor in Finsbury. She also served as International Secretary of the Communist Party. In this role she made several visits to Africa. She was involved in the Movement for Colonial Freedom (MCF), founded in 1954, and worked with Kwame Nkrumah, Jomo Kenyatta and other future leaders of emergent Africa.

In 1972 her first marriage was dissolved and she married Tony Gilbert. She continued to be active in politics for the rest of her life. She died on 25 January 1992.

== Publications written by Kay Beauchamp ==
- Leninism ~ a syllabus (1940)
- Our Borough - an introductory discussion syllabus. On the government of the borough of Finsbury (1945)
- Canvassing (1945)
- Fascism and how to defeat it (1959)
- We can get those deep shelters (1961)
- Black citizens (1973)
- Report of Liberation Conference to isolate and defeat racism (1977)
- One race, the human race (1979)
- Ethiopia: An African Giant Awakens [with Tony Gilbert] (1985)
- Racism: A Threat to World Peace – [with Amanda Mensah] (1986)
- Ring Around the Carnival [with Maggie Chetty] (1986)
