= Tim Brain =

British chief constable (born 1954)

Timothy John Brain (born 1954) was the chief constable of Gloucestershire from 2001 to 1 January 2010. He was previously Deputy Chief Constable from 1998.

== Early career ==
Before joining the Police Service, Brain was a student at the University of Wales, Aberystwyth, from 1972 to 1978, where he read History, obtaining a first class honours degree in 1975, and his PhD in 1983. He captained the university's team in the BBC television series University Challenge in 1976.

Brain joined the Avon and Somerset Constabulary in 1978 under the graduate entry 'fast track' scheme, rising from constable to chief inspector in that county before joining the Hampshire Constabulary on his promotion to Superintendent. He became Assistant Chief Constable in the West Midlands Police in 1994, where he was responsible for Community Affairs and later for Operations. His specific responsibilities included the policing of Euro '96, counter terrorist operations, and the extensive reorganisation of the force in 1997. In 1998 he was promoted to become Deputy Chief Constable of Gloucestershire, where his responsibilities included community relations and strategic planning.

== Chief Constable of Gloucestershire ==
On becoming Chief Constable of Gloucestershire Brain embarked upon a programme of significant strategic change. The Force's strategic plans, Vision5 and Vision 2010, have been recognised as leading examples of strategic management. His achievements include completing the first Tri-service (Police, Fire and Ambulance) Emergency Control Centre, creating new specialist investigative units to combat serious and organised crime, and receiving the Investors in People Award, becoming one of the few Police Forces to corporately achieve the standard. In January 2006 the Force completed a four-year project to build and occupy a new state of the art Headquarters. This was built under the Public Finance Initiative, and was concluded on time and under budget.

He has been a member of the Association of Chief Police Officers (ACPO) since 1994 and, until his retirement, was one of the most senior Chief Constables in the country. He was the Association's spokesperson on prostitution and related vice matters, taking a leading part in framing the Government's policy dealing with child prostitution in 1998 and creating ACPO's own prostitution strategy in 2004. He was chair of ACPO's Finance Business Area, with national responsibility for financial matters. He was also Chair of the Chief Police Officers' Staff Association (CPOSA). He led Gloucestershire's response to the extensive flooding and water emergency of 2007.

He has written extensively on a variety of police matters, and is a frequent speaker at conferences on a wide range of police subjects including strategic leadership, performance management and anti-vice policing. He has been a critical reader for several publishing projects. He is member of the University of Wales, Aberystwyth, advisory boards to the Department of History and Welsh History, and the School of Management and Business Studies. He was appointed visiting professor in Police Studies within the Faculty of Arts and Human Studies at London South Bank University in 2006 and Honorary Fellow of the University of Wales, Aberystwyth, in 2007. He announced his retirement as Chief Constable on 1 June 2009, to take effect from 1 January 2010.

== Honours and awards ==

Ribbon	Description	Notes
	Order of the British Empire (MBE)	2008
	Queen's Police Medal (QPM)	2002
	Queen Elizabeth II Golden Jubilee Medal	
	Police Long Service and Good Conduct Medal	

He was awarded the Queen's Police Medal (QPM) in the 2002 Birthday Honours. He was elected a Fellow of the Royal Society for the encouragement of Arts, Manufactures & Commerce (FRSA) in 2004. He was elected a Companion of the Chartered Management Institute (CCMI) in 2007. In the 2008 Birthday Honours, Brain became an Officer of the Order of the British Empire (OBE) for his services to the police and the community in Gloucestershire.

== Interests ==
His interests include history, music, rugby union and supporting Gloucestershire County Cricket Club. He is chair of British Police Rugby and the British Police Symphony Orchestra, and was responsible for leading the BPSO's extensive tour of India in February 2008. He is a Patron of The King's Foundation.

Brain is married with one son.
