= Peter Waddington =

British police officer and academic

Peter Anthony James Waddington
- Born: 6 March 1947
- Died: 21 March 2018 (aged 71)
- Occupation: Professor of Social Policy
- Employer: University of Wolverhampton
- Known for: Noted sociologist, Kettling

Peter Anthony James "Tank" Waddington (6 March 1947 – 21 March 2018), often credited as P. A. J. Waddington was a British police officer and later an academic at the University of Wolverhampton, in the United Kingdom. He is known for his research and works on policing and social policy; in particular he is credited for inventing the controversial police tactic of kettling.

== Academic career ==
Waddington began his career in 1963, as a Police Cadet and later Police Constable, in Birmingham City Police. He left in 1969, after gaining a BSc in sociology from the University of London. He continued his studies in sociology at the University of Leeds in 1970, and after attaining his master's degree, became a Research Officer (1970–73) and later Research Fellow (1973–74) at Leeds. By 1974, he was lecturing at the university. He completed his PhD in The Occupational Socialization of Prison Governor Grades, at Leeds in 1977.

In 1976, Waddington left for a new post at the University of Reading, where he lectured in sociology until 1992. He then became a reader, and by 1995, was a professor in the Department of Sociology. He became the Professor of Political Sociology in 1999. In 2005, Waddington moved to the University of Wolverhampton, where he took up the post of Professor of Social Policy, as well as becoming Honorary Director of the Central Institute for the Study of Public Protection, and Director of the History and Governance Research Institute.

== Views on public order policing ==
Speaking at the British Criminology Conference in 1989, Professor Waddington said that he was in favour of the use of CS spray and water cannon as a less violent alternative to the traditional police baton charge, which he saw as of doubtful legality and possibly dangerous.

In a comment piece in The Independent in 1993 after the murder of Patrick Dunn, a police constable in London, Waddington spoke out against calls to arm the police, saying that "Genuine protection is not offered by weaponry, but by the conditions in which the police carry out their task."

In 2009, Waddington wrote about his view of the difference between the 1990 poll tax riots and the 1999 May Day protests. He noted that the use of kettling in 1999 resulted in an orderly dispersal with very few arrests and no injuries: compared to the poll tax riots, this was a good conclusion. In a piece in the Birmingham Post he wrote, "I remain firmly of the view that containment succeeds in restoring order by using boredom as its principle weapon, rather than fear as people flee from on-rushing police wielding batons."

== Bibliography ==
- Protest, Policing and the Law (1985)
- Arming an Unarmed Police: Policy & Practice in the Metropolitan Police (1988)
- The Strong Arm of the Law: Armed and Public Order Policing (1991)
- Calling the Police: the Interpretation of, and Response to, Calls for Assistance from the Public (1993)
- The Policing of Mass Demonstration in Contemporary Democracies (1997)
- Policing Citizens: Authority and Rights (1999)
- Liberty And Order: Public Order Policing In A Capital City (2002)
- Policing Citizens: Police, Power and the State (2002)
- In Proportion: Race, and Police Stop and Search (2004)
- What is Policing? (2010), with Martin Wright
- The Violent Workplace (2012)
- Professional Police Practice: Scenarios and Dilemmas (2013), with John Kleinig and Martin Wright
- How People Judge Policing (2017), with Kate Williams, Tim Newburn and Martin Wright
