= Specialist Firearms Command =

London police firearms unit

- Active: December 1966 – present
- Country: United Kingdom
- Agency: Metropolitan Police
- Type: Firearms unit
- Part of: Met Operations

The Specialist Firearms Command (MO19) is the firearms unit of the Metropolitan Police Service. Formed in 2005, with antecedents dating back to 1966, the Command provides a firearms-response capability and supports the rest of the service, which is not routinely armed.

== Precursors ==
At its formation in 1829, the police service did not routinely carry firearms, but the Home Secretary later authorised the Commissioner to purchase fifty pairs of flintlock pistols for use in emergencies—such as those that involved the use of firearms. As time progressed, the obsolete flintlocks were decommissioned from service, being superseded by early revolvers. At the time, burglary (or "house breaking" as it was then called) was a common problem for police, and "house breakers" were often armed. Due to killings of officers by armed criminals in the outer districts of the metropolis, and after public calls debating whether Peel's service should be fully armed, the Commissioner applied to Peel for authorisation to supply officers in the outer districts with revolvers. The authorisation was issued on the condition that revolvers could only be issued if, in the opinion of the senior officer, the officer could be trusted to use them safely and with discretion. From that point, officers who felt the need to be armed could be. The practice lasted until 1936, although the vast majority of the system was phased out by the end of the 19th century.

In the 1860s, the flintlock pistols that had been purchased in 1829 were decommissioned from service, being superseded by 622 Beaumont–Adams revolvers firing the .450 cartridge, which were loaned from the army stores at the Tower of London following the 1867 Clerkenwell bombing. In 1883, a ballot was carried out to gather information on officers' views about arming, and 70% of the 6,325 officers serving on outer divisions wanted to be issued with revolvers. The now-obsolete Adams revolver was returned to stores for emergencies, and the Bulldog 'Metropolitan Police' revolver was issued to officers in the outer districts who felt the need to be armed. On 18 February 1887, PC 52206 Henry Owen became the first Met officer to fire a revolver while on duty, after being unable to alert the inhabitants of a premises on fire.

Following the Siege of Sidney Street in 1911, one thousand self-loading Webley & Scott pistols were purchased. In 1914, the Bulldogs were withdrawn from service and returned to stores. Lord Trenchard standardised the issue of pistols among divisions with the number of firearms issued depending on the size of the area; ten pistols with 320 rounds of ammunition were issued to divisional stations, six pistols with 192 rounds per sub-divisional station, and three pistols with 96 rounds to each section station. In 1936, the authorization to carry revolvers in outer districts was revoked, and at the same time, Canadian Ross rifles were purchased in the prelude to the Second World War. A review in 1952 following the Derek Bentley case found 15% of firearms in service to be defective, leading to Special Branch and Royalty Protection Officers being re-armed with an early version of the Beretta semi-automatic pistol.

== History ==
=== 1966–1979 ===
As it was originally named, the Firearms Wing (designation D6) was formed as part of the Civil Defence and Communications Branch within 'D' Department. The wing was formed in response to the murder of three officers. The Commissioner requested applications from officers within the service who had experience in the handling of firearms, such as ex-members of the armed forces or those who attended shooting clubs. The officers who applied were sent to the Small Arms Wing of the School of Infantry to become permanent instructors for the service's newly formed firearms wing. Upon the officers' return to the service, they trained firearms officers.

After the unit had changed its name from D6 to D11 in July 1967,. The instructors possessed a limited operational role that consisted of providing CS gas at sieges. This progressed to providing tactical advice and support, and in 1975, as a direct result of the Munich Olympic Games massacre, D11 was formally given an operational role in Counter Terrorist and serious armed crime operations. Its officers qualified using the Smith & Wesson Model 28 or Model 19 .357 revolvers, Browning Hi-Power semi-automatic pistols, the Heckler & Koch MP5 SD (Suppressed) submachine gun and the Remington 870 shotgun with some officers being trained and authorised to use the Enfield Enforcer 7.62 mm sniper rifle and Heckler & Koch 93 semi-automatic rifle in 5.56mm for counter-sniper roles. Throughout the 1970s, the branch increased in size, with additional firearms instructors being recruited to meet the increase in demand for firearms training. During the 1970s, D11 officers qualified their students in the Smith & Wesson Model 36 and the Model 10 revolvers.

=== 1980–1999 ===
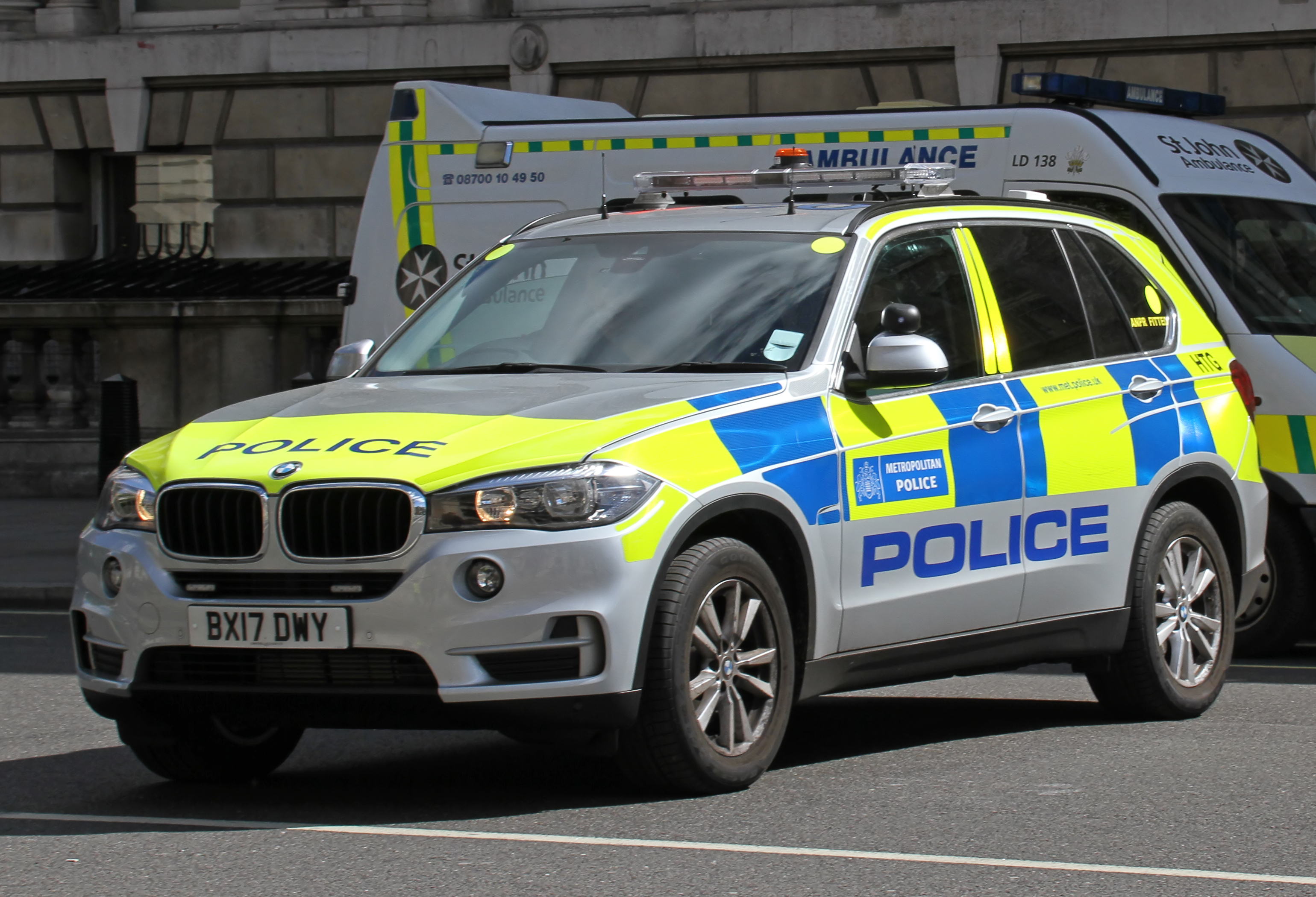
A BMW X5 armed response vehicle of the Metropolitan Police

In response to operational demands, the department underwent restructuring in 1987, becoming PT17 (Personnel & Training), and the introduction of non-instructors who formed level 2 teams. Their role was to deal with pre-planned and response operations not involving hostages or suspects with 'exceptional firepower'. These tasks remained the responsibility of the teams of Instructors who became Level 1 teams. In 1991, following the shooting and stabbing of several police officers, the armed response vehicles (ARVs) were introduced, with their concept influenced by West Yorkshire Police's Instant Response Cars, as used in 1976. The vehicles were put under the control of the unit drastically increasing its manpower and necessitating its move to Specialist Operations and a new designation of SO19, the Force Firearms Unit. Following their success, forces outside of the capital later formed them throughout the early to mid-1990s.

Early ARVs contained a secure safe between the seats containing a .38 Smith & Wesson Model 10 for each member, with two 9 mm Heckler & Koch MP5 semi-automatic carbines secured in the boot. After ARVs became established, and the practice was accepted for widespread use, the Model 10 revolvers were replaced by more recent self-loading Glock 17s, firing 9 mm rounds.

Revolvers and pistols could be removed from the secure safe by ARV members if an "immediate threat to life" was posed, in the opinion of the ARV member. Authorisation to remove carbines required authorisation from the control room once they had contacted an officer of Association of Chief Police Officers (ACPO) rank. If a high-ranking officer could not be sought to gain authorisation, such could be given by a Chief Inspector in an emergency. Since the early 2000s, ARV teams have carried side arms and carbines as a matter of routine.

=== 2000–present ===
ARV officers provided rapid response to spontaneous firearms incidents, such as armed robberies, being the first such organised system the capital had witnessed. Early ARV officers were issued with Smith & Wesson Model 10s, with others being trained in the use of the Heckler & Koch MP5 semi-automatic carbine. The Model 10 was later replaced by the Glock 17 semi-automatic pistol. Following a further reorganisation in 2005, SO19 became CO19, due to the department's move to the Central Operations Directorate; at the same time, the department was renamed from the Force Firearms Unit to the Specialist Firearms Command.

The unit maintained its training role and continued to train the Met's 4,800 officers who were redesignated as authorised firearms officers (AFOs). The level 2 officers underwent enhanced training, and those who passed joined selected Level 1 instructors to become Specialist Firearms Officers (SFOs). SFO teams replaced the old Level 1 and 2 structure, becoming full-time tactical teams dealing with all pre-planned armed operations (robbery ambushes, warrant service, and hostage situations, etc.) within the Met and providing specialist support to the ARVs.

In January 2012, the branch underwent another name change, becoming SCO19 due to the merger of Central Operations (CO) and Specialist Crime Directorate (SCD) to form Specialist Crime & Operations. Since then, SCO19 has again been re-designated as MO19, a result of the 2018–19 restructuring, putting it under Met Ops while maintaining the title of SCO19.

== Current role ==
All aspects of armed policing in the UK are covered by guidance issued by the Association of Chief Police Officers in their Manual of Guidance on the Police Use of Firearms. This manual provides an overview of the basic principles such as rules of engagement and tactics involved in the use of firearms by police officers in different environments along with details of command structures that are in place in all planned and spontaneous firearms operations.

=== Training ===
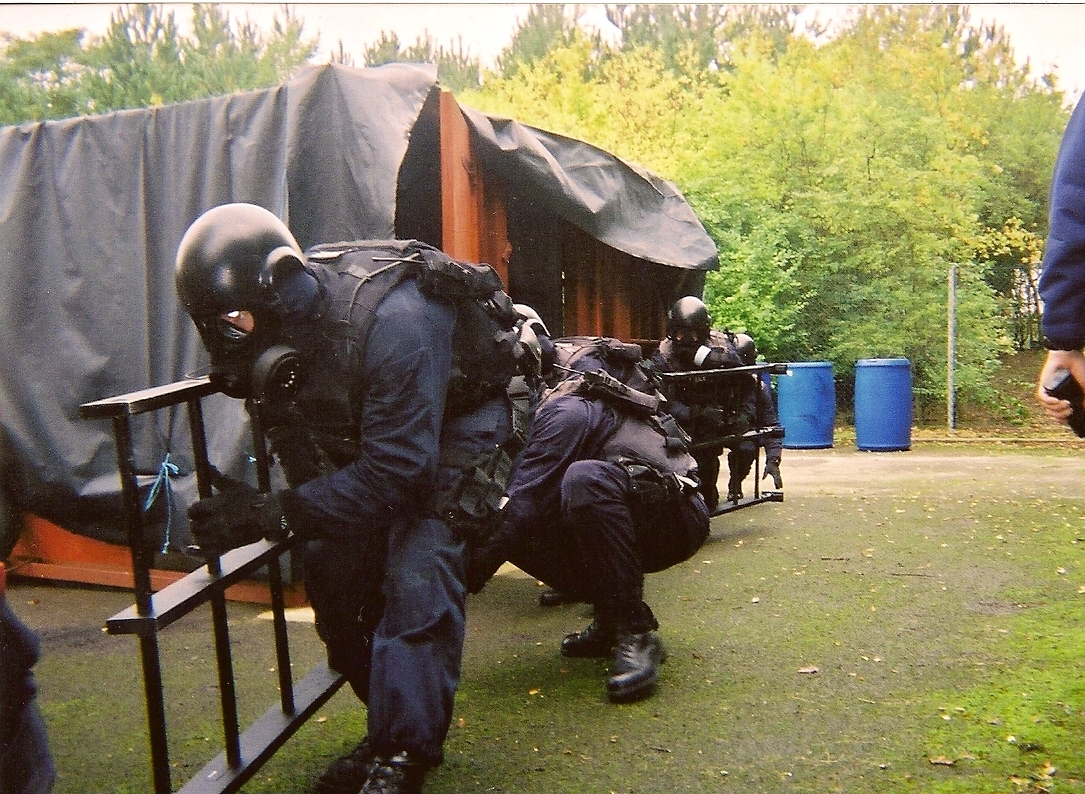
CO19 officers on a training exercise

As of 2007, the Command is responsible for training the 2,594 AFOs of the Metropolitan Police Service (MPS). These include officers from Protection Command, Counter Terrorism Command, the Aviation Security Operational Command Unit, the Flying Squad (SCD7[5]), the Territorial Support Group and the armed officers from MO19 itself.

Potential AFOs are invited to attend the Training Centre after they have undergone the written tests and interviews, and completed their probationary period with a further two years in a core policing role. They undergo two weeks of intensive training on the Glock 17 Pistol and the Heckler & Koch MP5 carbine; both weapons use 9mm rounds. This is followed by a further nine weeks of training focused on ARV tactics and searching buildings.

Based at MPSTC, MO19 provides initial and continuation training for all MPS firearms officers. There are more than twenty courses provided by nationally accredited firearms instructors. Courses are based on the National Firearms Training Curriculum to cover the variety of roles covered by AFOs in the MPS. The courses range from firepower demonstrations (to highlight the dangers of firearms to new MPS recruits) and initial firearms courses, to Operational Firearms Commander (OFC) training and National Firearms Instructor courses. There were 683 courses run at MPSTC in the 2006–07 financial year.

=== Current organisation ===
MO19 presently has two tiers of armed officers.

==== Armed response vehicles (ARVs) ====
The first tier is an armed response vehicle, or ARV. Commonly referred to as Trojans, ARVs are responsible for patrolling the city and providing immediate armed support to other police units. ARVs are a 24/7-365 London-wide resource that conduct targeted patrols of high-crime areas and are trained to engage in high-speed pursuits.

Each ARV is crewed by 3 armed response vehicle officers: driver, communications operator and observer/navigator.

The Met currently use marked and unmarked 2021, 22 and 23 plate Volvo XC90s and 2020 and 21 plate BMW X5 G05s as armed response vehicles, though the latter are being phased out after BMW halted sales of its police cars to UK forces in 2023.

Since June 2026, the Met has been trialling a marked 2025 plate Audi Q7 as an armed response vehicle.

While the exact number of ARVs covering London is not known as of 2026, the Met's 2022 Force Management Statement (data accurate as of 31 December 2021) confirmed that MO19 ARV capability is set at: 0700-1900 15 ARVs, 1900-0700 twelve ARVs and 1500-2300 five ARVs, with three supervisor vehicles staffed 24/7. In addition, the Met's SO18 Specialist Operational Aviation Policing (SOAP) have two ARVs on duty at London Heathrow Airport, the City of London Police (CoLP) Tactical Firearms Group have another two 24/7, whilst the British Transport Police (BTP) have up to eight ARVs on patrol.

==== Counter Terrorist Specialist Firearms Officers (CT-SFO) ====
CT-SFO identification patch

The highest tier is the Counter Terrorist Specialist Firearms Officer teams, which deal with MPS operations and also national firearms operations as part of the CTSFO Network. They provide firearms support to borough and specialist units. They are multi-skilled and can deliver all elements of armed policing, including operations to combat major crime, hostage taking, and terrorism.

MO19 has seven CTSFO teams consisting of one sergeant and 15 constables, both male and female, with six CTSFO Inspectors and an Operational Senior Manager with a reported strength of 130 officers. An operational CTSFO team works a 7-week shift pattern which includes night duty. CTSFO teams can be deployed by air or the river, using armoured vehicles and motorcycles if needed. On 28 July 2014, the single armed response vehicle service was launched.

In preparation for the Summer Olympics held in London in July 2012, officers were up-skilled from SFO standard, to a new certification known as Counter Terrorist Specialist Firearms Officer (CTSFO). This included the use of live rounds during close quarters combat (CQC) training and fast-roping from helicopters, to be able to respond more effectively to terrorist incidents. The training was conducted jointly with the United Kingdom Special Forces.

On 30 June 2015, CTSFO teams participated in Operation Strong Tower held in London, the largest counter-terrorism exercise conducted in the United Kingdom. The MPS released statistics that between January 2015 and December 2015, CTSFO teams were involved in 144 operations.

On 3 August 2016, the MPS held a press conference for the announcement of Operation Hercules, displaying the CTSFO teams to the public wearing wolf-grey-coloured tactical uniforms, equipped with SIG Sauer SIG516 and SIG MCX carbines, Glock 17 handguns, Remington 870 shotgun, Accuracy International AT308 sniper rifle, and paraded the BMW F800GS motorcycles used for deployments in central London.

On 19 March 2017, CTSFO teams participated in maritime Exercise Anchor on the River Thames, their first joint major live-play exercise. On 22 March 2017, CTSFO teams rapidly deployed to the 2017 Westminster attack.

CTSFO teams use the Plasan SandCat armoured vehicle, as well as various other unmarked vehicles, including Toyota Land Cruisers, BMW X5s and Land Rover Discoveries. The CTSFO training facilities at the MPS Specialist Training Centre includes indoor and outdoor live-fire shooting ranges, an assault house for practising method of entry (MOE) techniques and train, subway and aircraft mock-ups. CTSFO volunteers are recruited from serving ARV officers. A candidate has to be recommended by their supervisor, undertake a two-day assessment, and pass both shooting and physical standards. If candidates pass this stage, they will then be offered a place on a CTSFO course where they will begin to upskill for their new role.

=== Current locations ===
Base	Base name	Address	London Borough
North Base	Leman Street	7 E Tenter St, London E1 8DN	Tower Hamlets
East Base	Limehouse	27 W India Dock Rd, E14 8AL	Tower Hamlets
South Base	Lambeth	11 Old Paradise St, SE11 6BB	Lambeth
West Base	Lillie Road	21 Lillie Rd, SW6 1EU	Hammersmith and Fulham

== Equipment ==
=== Firearms ===
As of April 2019, the following firearms are in use by the Specialist Firearms Command:

Make	Model	Origin	Cartridge	Image
Glock	17, 17M, 19, 19M, 26 (Gen3-5)	Austria	9×19mm	
Heckler & Koch	MP5A2, MP5A3, MP5K	Germany	9×19mm	
Heckler & Koch	G36C	Germany	5.56×45mm	
SIG Sauer	SIG516, SIG716	Germany	5.56×45mm, 7.62x51mm	
SIG Sauer	SIG MCX, SIG MCX Rattler	Germany	5.56×45mm	
Heckler & Koch	G3K	Germany	7.62x51mm	
Accuracy International	Arctic Warfare, Arctic Warfare Magnum	United Kingdom	7.62x51mm, .338 Lapua Magnum	
Benelli	M3	Italy	12-gauge	
Heckler & Koch	HK69A1	Germany	40 mm grenade	

=== Less lethal ===
Officers are also equipped with the non-lethal Taser devices. All officers are also issued with the same basic equipment as other police officers, which includes ASP Baton, CS Gas, Speedcuffs, and radios.

=== Body armour ===
MO19 officers are equipped with bulletproof vests, instead of the standard stabproof vest, which only has low-level ballistic capability.

== List of operations ==
Notable operations and incidents involving officers from the SFC:

- Spaghetti House siege (1975)
- Iranian Embassy siege (1980)
- Northolt siege (1985)
- Shooting of Diarmuid O'Neill (1996)
- Shooting of Harry Stanley (1999)
- Millennium Dome raid (2000)
- Hackney siege (2002–2003)
- Shooting of Azelle Rodney (2005)
- Manhunt following 21 July 2005 London bombings (2005)
- Shooting of Jean Charles de Menezes (2005) (related to above, although the wrong person was shot)
- Forest Gate raid (2006)
- Chandler's Ford shooting (2007)
- Shooting of Mark Saunders (2008)
- Shooting of Mark Duggan (2011)
- Westminster terrorist attack (2017)
- London Bridge terrorist attack (2017)
- London Bridge stabbing (2019)
- Streatham stabbing (2020)
- Shooting of Chris Kaba (2022)

== See also ==
- Police use of firearms in the United Kingdom
- Firearms unit
- Authorised firearms officer
