= Anthony Long =

Anthony Long may refer to:

- A. A. Long (Anthony Arthur Long, born 1937), classical scholar
- Anthony Long (footballer), Australian rules footballer for Essendon
- Anthony Long (police officer), British police marksman
