= Chandler's Ford shooting =

Attempted robbery in England in 2007

Coordinates: 50°58′59″N 1°22′57″W

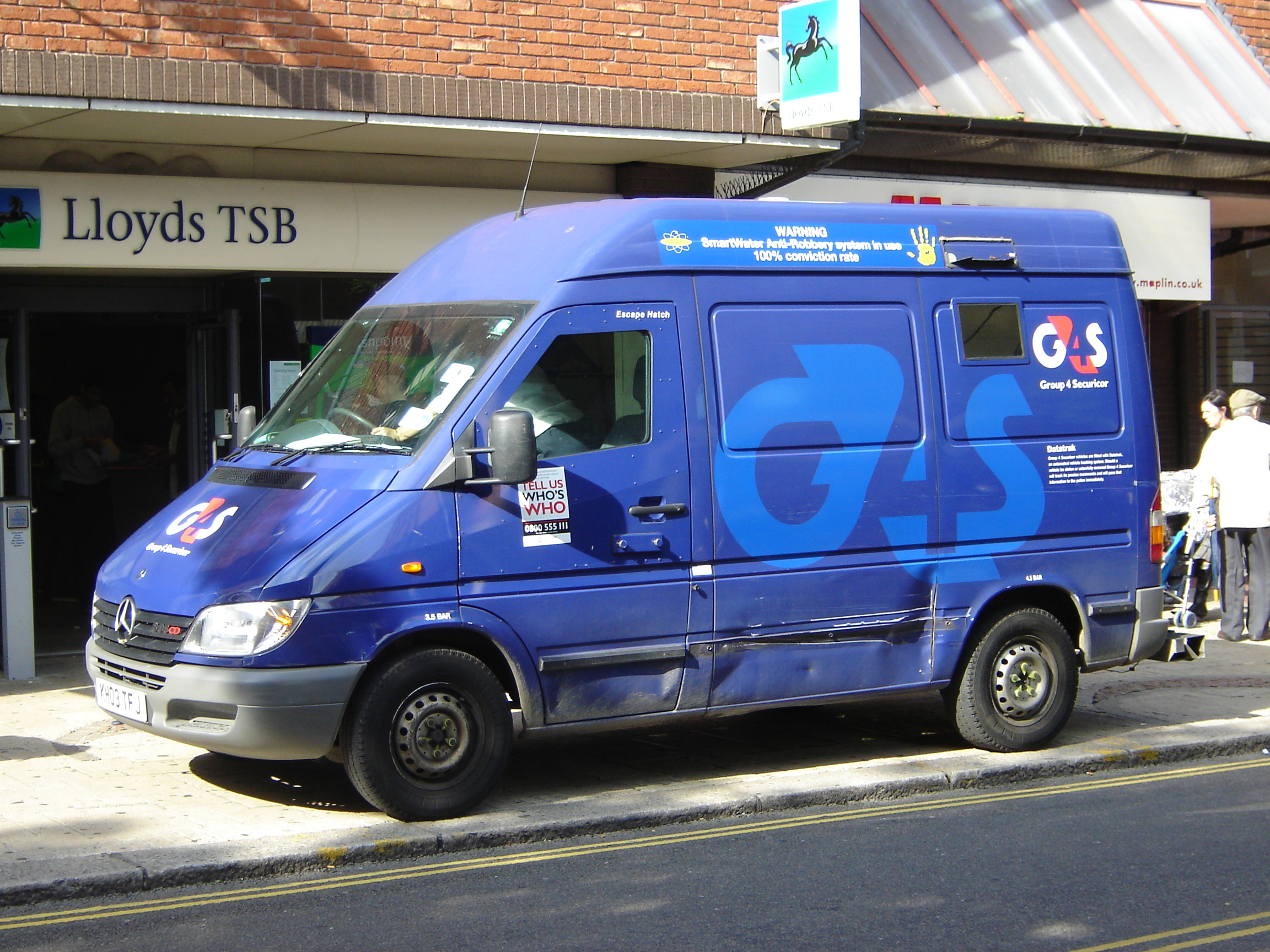
A G4S cash-in-transit van, similar to the one involved in the robbery

The Chandler's Ford shooting (codenamed Operation Hurlock by the police) was the shooting of armed robbers in the town of Chandler's Ford, Hampshire, in southern England, on 13 September 2007. Two men were shot dead by Metropolitan Police officers while they were robbing a cash-in-transit van at gunpoint. The Metropolitan Police's Flying Squad had been tracking a gang of armed robbers from South London who were estimated to have stolen £500,000 (£844,000 today) from 18 robberies of security vans. The Flying Squad received intelligence that the gang intended to target the HSBC branch in Chandler's Ford and planned to lie in wait and apprehend the suspects as they attempted the robbery.

Armed police officers arrived in Chandler's Ford in the early hours of the morning of 13 September and concealed themselves in a public toilet close to the bank, supported by snipers in overlooking buildings. At 10:05, shortly after the arrival of the G4S van, Mark Nunes (wearing a mask) approached the guard and pointed a gun at him, demanding he hand over the cash box. A police sniper opened fire, hitting Nunes in the chest. As officers were deploying from their hiding place, a second gang member, Andrew Markland, ran over and picked up Nunes's weapon; he was shot twice by a second sniper. Police officers attempted first aid but Markland died at the scene. Nunes was airlifted to hospital but died later that day.

At the trial of the remaining gang members, the jury was shown footage from a police surveillance post at Chandler's Ford, including the moment Nunes and Markland were shot. The shooting was investigated by the Independent Police Complaints Commission (IPCC), which concluded that the armed officers had acted properly, though it found flaws in the planning of the operation. An inquest held in 2011 reached a verdict of lawful killing, after which the IPCC published its full report, recommending that a firearms commander independent of the investigation be appointed to lead future operations. The Metropolitan Police implemented the recommendation.

== Background ==
The vast majority of police officers in the United Kingdom do not carry firearms. Only specially selected and trained officers are authorised to carry firearms and operations involving armed officers must be authorised by a senior officer. Officers who discharge their weapons must be able to justify their actions as "reasonable force", used in self-defence or the defence of another. The decision to fire rests with the individual officer, who remains legally accountable for his actions. Officers can face criminal charges should their actions be considered unjustified, and several have been charged with murder.

== Prelude ==
In 2007, the Flying Squad of London's Metropolitan Police, a unit specialising in investigating armed robberies, was investigating a criminal gang responsible for a series of bank robberies. The gang, led by Mark Nunes and Andrew Markland, consisted largely of career criminals from South London. Nunes had been released from prison in 2005, having served several years for previous robberies. In the 18 months prior to September 2007, the gang had targeted banks in small towns and villages in the home counties and some further afield, where they anticipated that the police response would be slower and more limited than in London. They twice targeted banks in Bristol, over 100 miles (160 kilometres) from London. The gang were responsible for at least 18 robberies, in which they had carried firearms and had violently assaulted security guards who had resisted, and had stolen around £500,000 (£844,000).

The Flying Squad received intelligence that the gang intended to rob a cash-in-transit van operated by the security services company G4S as it made a delivery to a HSBC bank branch in Chandler's Ford, Hampshire. The gang had used a handgun in previous robberies and had fired at bank staff and members of the public. They were in possession of armour-piercing ammunition, which police believed they intended to fire into the van if the crew did not comply with their demands. Thus, the Flying Squad opted to employ armed officers from CO19, the Metropolitan Police's specialist firearms unit. The police planned to have armed officers lie in wait for the gang in a concealed location close to the bank, in order to arrest the gang members in the act. Other officers were watching from nearby buildings, along with snipers to cover the officers as they approached the scene and to protect the security guard before the officers arrived. The local police force, Hampshire Constabulary, agreed to allow the Metropolitan Police to control the operation, codenamed Operation Hurlock.

== Robbery ==
Map of the area where the shooting took place. Marked are the locations of the bank, the public toilets where police officers were hiding (50 m (160 ft) from the bank), and the bus stop where Markland was spotted.

In the early hours of 13 September 2007, Flying Squad and CO19 officers attended a briefing at Leman Street police station in East London before travelling to Chandler's Ford, arriving at around 04:00. Armed officers took up position in a block of public toilets about 50 metres (160 feet) from the bank, supported by snipers in vantage points overlooking the bank. The officers concealed in the toilet block were kept informed of events through radio communication with the snipers. At around 06:00, the team received word from officers watching the gang that several members were travelling towards Chandler's Ford in a stolen vehicle.

At around 09:15, police officers observed Markland at a bus stop close to the bank. Other gang members were spotted in the vicinity shortly afterwards, some repeatedly driving past the bank in a stolen vehicle. Shortly before 10:00, Nunes arrived in a second stolen vehicle and parked opposite the bank. A few minutes later, the G4S van arrived and the guard on board began carrying cash boxes into the bank. At 10:05, Nunes approached the guard, pointing a handgun at his chest, causing him to freeze. One of the police snipers opened fire. Nunes, hit in the chest, collapsed at the guard's feet. By this time, the armed officers who had been hiding in the toilet block were running towards the bank. Meanwhile, Markland ran across to Nunes and picked up the gun. As he stood back up with the weapon, he was shot by a second police sniper. Hit in the chest, Markland collapsed; he was seen moving on the ground and the sniper fired again.

Police officers attempted to administer first aid as they reached the van but Markland died at the scene. Nunes was taken to Southampton General Hospital by the Hampshire & Isle of Wight Air Ambulance but died later the same day. The security guard suffered a minor injury to his hand, having been grazed by a bullet. The remaining gang members fled the area in one of the stolen vehicles.

== Aftermath ==
Still taken from the police video of the robbery showing the moment a masked figure (Nunes) confronts the security guard, pointing a handgun at him. The video was shown to jurors in the trial of the other gang members and at the inquest into Nunes's and Markland's deaths.

Over the following days, the Metropolitan Police conducted armed raids at multiple locations across London and arrested seven gang members. They were charged with conspiracy to rob and various other offences in connection with Chandler's Ford and seventeen robberies. They were convicted in August 2008 and received prison sentences ranging from five to seventeen years. During the trial, the jury was shown a video of the Chandler's Ford attempted robbery taken by police officers from one of the snipers' posts, including the moments Nunes and Markland were shot. Stills from the footage were later released to the media. On the video, a man in a balaclava (identified as Nunes) can be seen approaching the guard with a handgun raised and a police officer can be heard saying into a radio: "Robbery, robbery. Strike, strike, strike! He has a gun to his head", almost immediately followed by a gunshot.

As with all shootings by police officers, an independent investigation was launched by the Independent Police Complaints Commission (IPCC). The IPCC released its preliminary report in October 2008. It found that, "although there are issues around the implementation of the operation", the police marksmen had not committed any misconduct, and had acted properly, in line with national guidelines for the conduct of armed officers.

An inquest was held in Winchester in 2011, at which the jury was shown the police surveillance footage of the robbery and shooting. The inquest heard evidence from the police officers involved (including the two marksmen who fired the shots, who remained anonymous), the IPCC, and eyewitnesses. The first marksman testified that he fired because he believed Nunes was a threat to the guard and to the public, and he waited until Nunes moved before firing for fear of hitting the guard. The coroner directed the jury that they could only return an open verdict or one of lawful killing. The jury decided on lawful killing, though the coroner noted that there were several opportunities for the police to arrest Nunes and Markland safely but these were not taken as the police felt they had insufficient evidence to secure a conviction. The families of the deceased expressed disappointment that the coroner had not allowed the jury to record a narrative verdict, which they felt would have better enabled the jury to "identify any failures in the police operation that they considered caused or more than minimally contributed to the men's deaths". The Metropolitan Police issued a statement saying, "These circumstances illustrate clearly the immensely difficult and split-second decisions that officers have to make when protecting the public from the actions of armed criminals" and promised to review the findings of the inquest and the IPCC.

Following the inquest, the IPCC released its full report, which contained several recommendations. Among them was that a separate firearms commander—independent of the investigation—be appointed for similar operations in the future to better balance public safety against the need to gather evidence. In a statement, the IPCC said "We will never know if there would have been a different outcome had the Metropolitan Police separated the role". The Metropolitan Police implemented the recommendation before the report was published.

According to Peter Squires and Peter Kennison, British criminologists with a focus on armed policing, the public reaction to the shooting was generally positive. The academics observed that, unlike in other incidents they studied, the police appeared to have shot the "right" men, in so far as the only people killed were armed criminals in the commission of a robbery. Nonetheless, they pointed out that the operation could only be seen as a "qualified success", given that its stated objectives included the apprehension of the suspects, and observed that the security guard could easily have sustained much more serious injuries. In a later study of police use of firearms, Squires alone compared the incident to the shootings of Azelle Rodney in 2005 and of Terry Nicholas earlier in 2007. In all three incidents, the police had intelligence that a crime was going to be committed but allowed events to proceed in order to gather evidence, resulting in dangerous confrontations (both Nicholas and Rodney were killed), rather than intervene at an earlier point and arrest the suspects safely but potentially jeopardise an investigation. Squires and Kennison concluded that the shooting and the lengthy prison sentences for the other gang members sent a "clear message" about police handling of armed crime, even if the shooting raised questions about the planning of the operation.

== See also ==
- Millennium Dome raid, another attempted robbery foiled by the Flying Squad in 2000
- List of killings by law enforcement officers in the United Kingdom
