= List of killings by police in the United Kingdom =

This list of people killed by police in the United Kingdom documents cases of people who died directly or indirectly because of the actions of British law enforcement officers, regardless of the manner of death, duty status of the officers, or if they acted officially or unofficially. It includes officers working for all law enforcement agencies, existing or historical, in England, Wales, Scotland, and Northern Ireland, but excludes crown dependencies, colonies or other political entities subject or previously subjected to the direct control of the government of the United Kingdom. It also excludes deaths for which other government agents are responsible, such as deaths as a result of actions of the British Armed Forces.

Many of the killings were by the Royal Ulster Constabulary (RUC) during the Troubles in Northern Ireland. Police in Northern Ireland killed 56 people during the conflict, including at least 30 civilians and at least 20 paramilitary members.

== Single deaths in a single incident ==
=== 2020s ===
Name	Date	Location	Police force	Result of police action	Description	Ruling
Angelo Russo	12 May 2026	Bedford, Bedfordshire	Bedfordshire Police	Direct	Officers responded to reports of vehicle damage and encountered a man who had barricaded himself in his house. He poured petrol around the house and threatened to set off an explosion by turning on his gas, prompting local residents to be evacuated. After a several hour standoff, the man was killed by a single police rifle shot after allegedly pointing a firearm at officers.	Under investigation by the IOPC
Tony Keeble	29 December 2025	Thetford, Norfolk	Norfolk Constabulary	Direct	Officers responded to a two-vehicle collision involving a Mercedes van and Honda Jazz on the A11 London Road in Thetford at around 20:25 GMT. When police arrived, they found the van empty and the driver of the Honda Jazz with minor injuries. The driver of the Mercedes, a man in his sixties, walked northbound on the southbound carriageway, with members of the public informing police that he was in possession of a handgun. Officers arrived on the southbound carriageway and fired two shots 'from a short distance away'. The man was declared deceased at the scene at approximately 22:15 GMT.	Under investigation by the IOPC
David Joyce	1 April 2025	Milton Keynes, Buckinghamshire	Thames Valley Police and British Transport Police	Direct	Officers from Thames Valley Police and British Transport Police were called at 12:55 GMT to reports of a man carrying a firearm at Milton Keynes railway station. The man had called 999, stating ‘there is a man with a gun down at the train station in Milton Keynes’, before hanging up. When the 999 call handler called the number back, the man who made the original 999 call explained that the man with the gun was acting suspiciously and looked like he was about to 'do something bad', explaining how the man was 'definitely' in possession of a gun. Thames Valley Police said its armed officers responded and challenged the man, 38-year-old David Joyce, who was in possession of a steak knife, with a 12cm blade, before firing shots after he "moved at speed" towards them. Later, checks revealed that the 999 call was made by a number linked to Joyce, with CCTV from the station showing Joyce on the phone at the relevant times. Prior to the shooting, in February 2025, Joyce had attended a police station in possession of a knife whilst experiencing a mental health crisis.	Under investigation by the IOPC
Marcus Meade	24 December 2024	Redditch, Worcestershire	West Mercia Police	Direct	West Mercia Police were called after concerns were raised for the safety of a man in possession of a knife at a property. A police negotiator responded and engaged with the man, 39-year-old Marcus Meade over several hours. Distraction devices and Tasers were allegedly used during the incident. He was later shot by an armed officer.	Under investigation by the IOPC
Mariam Ahmed	17 October 2024	Eltham, London	Metropolitan Police	Direct	Metropolitan Police officers in an unmarked police car were in pursuit of a stolen moped at approximately 18:15 GMT on Eltham Road, south east London. 38-year-old Mariam Ahmed was in a vehicle ahead of the police car and indicated to turn right into Sutcliffe Park, when she was struck by a police car overtaking slow-moving traffic. The collision caused Ahmed's vehicle to flip several times, killing her and her unborn child, whom she was 39 weeks pregnant with. An attempt was made to save Ahmed and her unborn baby, with an emergency C-section being performed at the roadside, however, both were pronounced dead. It was believed the police vehicle was travelling at 80mph in the 40mph zone.	Under investigation by the IOPC
Joel Stenning	11 August 2024	Knaphill, Surrey	Surrey Police	Direct	Surrey Police were called to reports shortly before 00:30 BST of two people involved in an altercation in Knaphill, with one of the people involved said to be in possession of a weapon. When officers arrived, the caller reported that one of the men had gone into an address. Police called for the man, later found to be 29-year-old Joel Stenning, to come to the door of the address with nothing in his hands. Stenning opened the door and appeared to point a weapon in the direction of the officers. One of the officers fired one shot, with another firing a police baton round. A 'non-police issue weapon' was located at the scene. First aid was provided to Stenning, who was taken to hospital where he initially was in a critical but stable condition, before dying four days later at St George's Hospital in Tooting, London, with a provisional cause of death being from 'complications of a gunshot wound to the abdomen'.	Under investigation by the IOPC
Bryce Hodgson	30 January 2024	Southwark, London	Metropolitan Police	Direct	Metropolitan Police officers responded to a report that a man, who was armed, was attempting to get into a bedroom of a property, where residents had barricaded themselves in. When police arrived at 05:07 GMT, they located 30-year-old Bryce Hodgson, a convicted stalker who was prohibited from entering the road on which he was on. This followed an incident where he admitted entering a woman's bedroom without consent and was sentenced to a 16-week suspended prison sentence and restraining order, in July 2023. When police first arrived, Hodgson, who was wearing body armour, was attempting to break through an internal door with a sword. Officers challenged him with a Taser, however Hodgson repeatedly swung a sword in the officer's direction. The officers withdrew and requested assistance, with firearms officers arriving at the scene at approximately 05:15 GMT. Having attempted to negotiate with Hodgson, he pointed a loaded crossbow at the officers, with an officer shooting him twice in the neck and chest. Despite being given first aid, Hodgson died at the scene. Officers later recovered weapons included crossbows, a knife, sword and hatchet.	Lawful killing
Giedrius Vasiljevas	23 November 2023	Dagenham, London	Metropolitan Police	Direct	Metropolitan Police officers responded to a report from 40-year-old Giedrius Vasiljevas that he had two loaded guns, a beretta and an air rifle and wanted to shoot himself. Vasiljevas was described as being 'distressed' and 'intoxicated' and had a history of alcohol use and mental health issues, of which he had been unsuccessful in getting support with. When Vasiljevas appeared at the doorway, he was shot twice, with one shot striking him in the lower abdomen. Vasiljevas was pronounced dead at the scene. The gun Vasiljevas had said he was in possession of was later found to be an unloaded CO2 powered BB gun. The officer who fired the shots stated that Vasiljevas pointed a gun directly at both them and another officer. Police bodyworn footage did not clearly show this (due to the environment being dark), however, it appears to show Vasiljevas in possession of a black handgun. Accounts from other officers noted how they saw Vasiljevas arm raise in the direction of the officer who fired the shots.	Lawful killing
Helen Holland	10 May 2023	West London, London	Metropolitan Police	Direct	PC Christopher Harrison, a Metropolitan Police motorcyclist, was escorting Sophie, Duchess of Edinburgh in a convoy with other outriders as she left the Foreign and Commonwealth Development Office on King Charles Street. When the convoy got to West Cromwell Road, he struck 81-year-old Helen Holland at a crossing. Holland was hospitalised and later died from 'complications from a severe head injury'. PC Harrison later explained that he 'did not see her in the footway at all on the approach'	Police officer found not guilty of causing death by dangerous driving. Misconduct matters to be considered 'as soon as possible'
Heather Smedley	23 December 2022	Oldham, Manchester	Greater Manchester Police	Direct	Greater Manchester Police officer PC Mark Burrows was driving an unmarked police car pursuing a suspected stolen Audi A3, when he crashed into a Peugeot 108 that was being driven by 53-year-old Heather Smedley. Smedley died at the scene of the crash. PC Burrows was later charged with causing death by dangerous driving. Appearing at court in April 2025, PC Burrows pleaded not guilty to causing Smedley's death, by either dangerous or careless driving.	Police officer acquitted of charge of causing death by dangerous driving on 7 May 2026.
Sergii Kuzmenko	20 December 2022	Carlisle, Cumbria	Cumbria Constabulary	Direct	Cumbria Constabulary received reports of a man making threats to kill in the presence of a young child at an address in Carlisle. Officers attended the address and located 40-year-old Sergii Kuzmenko, in possession of a knife. Officers shot Kuzmenko, who died at the scene.	IOPC concluded that officers acted in accordance with their training. An inquest into Kuzmenko's death will be held before a jury.
Marius Ciolac	7 October 2022	Derby, England	Derbyshire Constabulary	Direct	Armed officers shot a man allegedly wielding a knife outside a police station. Taser and baton rounds were reported to have been discharged at the male before he was finally shot, a number of knives were found at the scene of the incident.	Lawful killing
Chris Kaba	5 September 2022	Streatham Hill, London	Metropolitan Police	Direct	Police followed a vehicle being driven by Chris Kaba. The vehicle rammed other cars after being blocked by armed police while officers surrounded it on foot. Kaba was shot and taken to hospital where he died. The officer was suspended from duty while being investigated for murder. The case was referred to the Crown Prosecution Service by the police in 2023, and the officer was later charged with murder. The officer was reinstated on 22 October 2024 after being found not guilty.	Inquest opened in October 2022. Officer involved found not guilty at trial.
Unidentified Man	11 December 2021	Kensington, London	Metropolitan Police	Direct	Police responded to reports of a man with a firearm in Kensington after he raided a bank and bookmakers. Around 20 minutes later, police shot the gunman dead as he travelled in the back of a taxi. A non-police firearm was recovered from the scene.	
Odichukumma Kelvin Igweani	26 June 2021	Milton Keynes, Buckinghamshire	Thames Valley Police	Direct	Police were called to a property in Milton Keynes where they found a young child seriously injured and another man dead after reportedly trying to save the child. A taser was deployed before officers shot the assailant dead.	Lawful killing
Graham Trinder	8 November 2020	Swindon, Wiltshire	Wiltshire Police	Direct	Wiltshire Police reported attending a call of two men "arguing in the street", during this incident, a man was shot dead by a responding officer. Cleared of any misconduct by the IOPC and it was stated a non-police issue firearm was found at the scene.	Lawful killing
Badreddin Abadlla Adam	26 June 2020	Glasgow, Scotland	Police Scotland	Direct	Adam was shot by armed officers after he stabbed several people at the Park Inn Hotel in Glasgow.	
Hassan Yahya	8 March 2020	Westminster, London	City of London Police	Direct	Shot after challenging officers with knives.	Lawful killing
Sudesh Amman	2 February 2020	Streatham, London	Metropolitan Police	Direct	Shot after stabbing three people with a machete while wearing a fake explosive belt.	Lawful killing
William Cameron	6 January 2020	Loddon Valley police station, Berkshire	Thames Valley Police	Unknown	A police sergeant and a health care professional are subject to a criminal investigation in relation to his death after he arrived at the Loddon station in a state of unconsciousness.	

=== 2010s ===
Name	Date	Location	Police force	Result of police action	Description	Ruling
Usman Khan	29 November 2019	London	City of London Police and Metropolitan Police	Direct	Khan stabbed five people – two of whom later died – in the vicinity of London Bridge. He was wearing a fake explosive vest, and was shot 11 times by police, dying at the scene.	Lawful killing
Leroy Junior Medford	2 April 2019	Reading, England	Thames Valley Police	Indirect	Medford was arrested on 1 April 2019. While in custody he swallowed drugs he was carrying. Despite several opportunities to implement the Drugs Standard Operating Procedure, officers failed to do so. Proper care and monitoring was not provided, leading to his deteriorating health being unnoticed. He later died in hospital.	Failure to implement, the Drugs Standard Operating Procedure.
Trevor Smith	15 March 2019	Birmingham, England	West Midlands Police	Direct	Shot by police who surrounded a property. Police said a non-police issued firearm was recovered from the property.	Lawful killing
Sean Fitzgerald	4 January 2019	Coventry, England	West Midlands Police	Direct	Shot, while unarmed, during an arrest operation at a property. Witnesses reported hearing four or five gunshots. Two other men were arrested at the scene on suspicion of cultivating cannabis.	Lawful killing
Richard Cottier	9 April 2018	Romford, London	Metropolitan Police	Direct	Cottier called police in the early hours of the morning telling them he had taken an overdose and claiming he had a gun. A member of the public also informed police of a man with a gun. Officers found Cottier at a petrol station and fired two shots. He died at the scene.	Lawful killing
Nuno Cardoso	24 November 2017	Oxford, England	Thames Valley Police	Indirect	After being confronted by officers at his student residence at Ruskin College, Oxford, Cardoso was wrestled to ground, held face down with an officer sitting on his legs. He was then struck with a baton to the back of his knee. Cardoso collapsed in the back of a police van due to ingestion of alcohol, cocaine and morphine. Officers failed to follow guidance to take him to a nearby hospital, instead heading to Abingdon Police station, before his collapse en route.	Uncritical narrative conclusion
Spencer Ashworth	27 September 2017	Portishead, England	Avon and Somerset Police	Direct	Police responded to reports of a man in a car with a handgun threatening other drivers. Firearms officers discharged 15 rounds of ammunition during the incident after Ashworth raised his weapon and fired at police. After shots had been fired he was removed from the car by officers, who began resuscitation attempts. A non-police issued firearm (air pistol) was recovered.	Lawful killing
Khalid Masood	22 March 2017	Westminster, London	Metropolitan Police	Direct	After using a vehicle to hit and kill pedestrians on Westminster Bridge, Masood ran into the grounds of the Palace of Westminster, where he fatally stabbed an unarmed police officer. An armed police officer, believed to have been the Metropolitan Police close protection officer for Michael Fallon, the Secretary of State for Defence, witnessed the stabbing, ran towards the scene and fatally shot Masood.	Lawful killing
Yassar Yaqub	2 January 2017	Huddersfield, England	West Yorkshire Police	Direct	Yaqub was shot by police at junction 24 of the M62, after they received a tip-off that people in the vehicle were in possession of a firearm. A firearm was recovered from the scene.	Lawful killing
Lewis Skelton	29 November 2016	Hull, England	Humberside Police	Direct	Police responded to reports of Skelton wielding an axe, and after deploying tasers, he was shot by armed response officers and died of his wounds in hospital.	Unlawful killing. The firearms officer who shot Skelton did not face misconduct proceedings.
Josh Pitt	9 November 2016	Luton, England	Bedfordshire Police	Direct	Police responded to assist a woman in a flat. After police arrival, Pitt barricaded himself in a room with a hostage and a number of knives, making threats to hurt the hostage. A taser was deployed but despite this he attempted to stab a police officer and was shot in the chest. He was treated by officers and paramedics before being taken to hospital, where he died. Police recovered a "number of knives".	Lawful killing
Dalian Atkinson	15 August 2016	Telford, England	West Mercia Police	Indirect (underlying health condition)	Police responded to a call that Atkinson was in a "manic state" and was threatening to kill his father. After being tasered, Atkinson went into cardiac arrest on the way to hospital, where he was pronounced dead.	Unlawful killing. One police officer involved was found guilty of manslaughter and was given an eight-year prison sentence.
William Smith	2 May 2016	Goudhurst, England	Kent Police	Direct	Police fatally shot Smith during an armed operation. Smith was on bail in connection with the death of a 73-year-old man. Non-police issue firearms were recovered from the address in question.	Lawful killing
James Wilson	29 March 2016	South Shields, England	Northumbria Police	Direct	Wilson was shot by a plastic bullet, and a live round from a police firearm after he refused to lower the air pistol he was carrying, after being told to do so seven times. He was taken to hospital, but died on 1 April.	Lawful killing
Jermaine Baker	11 December 2015	Wood Green, London	Metropolitan Police	Direct	Three men were planning to free Izzet Eren, who was being taken in a prison van to Wood Green Crown Court over firearms offences. Armed police intercepted the men. Baker, who was in the front seat, was fatally shot as police surrounded his vehicle. He was unarmed, although there was an imitation Uzi in the rear foot-well behind the driver's seat.	Lawful killing
Richard Davies	21 October 2015	St Neots, England	Cambridgeshire Police	Direct	Davies threatened to kill his children and fired at police a number of times before he was shot once in the chest and killed by officers.	Lawful killing
James Fox	30 August 2015	London	Metropolitan Police	Direct	Shot by police after reportedly making threats to kill both a child and adult. An air pistol was recovered from the scene.	Lawful killing
Sheku Bayoh	3 May 2015	Kirkcaldy, Scotland	Police Scotland	Unclear (inquiry ongoing)	Bayoh was taken into police custody whilst α-PVP was in his system. It was reported he had been brandishing a knife but this was later disproved by video footage. He sustained bruising from police batons, had his arms and legs restrained and died of asphyxiation in police custody.	Independent public inquiry ongoing
Matthew Williams	6 November 2014	Argoed, Wales	Gwent Police	Indirect (combination of police restraint and fatal drug overdose)	Williams, who had recently been released from prison, attacked and killed a 22-year-old woman, identified as Cerys Yemm. Police responded to a 999 call to find Williams eating Yemm's corpse and shouted a warning, which Williams ignored. PC Alan Cotterell and several unidentified officers then tasered Williams before handcuffing him. Williams became unresponsive and died shortly after.	William's cause of death listed as "sudden unexpected death following a struggle against restraint including discharge of a Taser in a man with a history of schizophrenia who had taken amphetamine and cannabis".
Dean Joseph	5 September 2014	London	Metropolitan Police	Direct	Shot by a police marksman after holding a woman at gunpoint in an armed standoff.	Lawful killing
Anthony Grainger	3 March 2012	Culcheth, England	Greater Manchester Police	Direct	Grainger was shot by police while sitting unarmed in a stolen vehicle. In January 2014 the Crown Prosecution Service announced they would be prosecuting Chief Constable Sir Peter Fahy under health and safety legislation over the shooting, and a full public inquiry into Grainger's death was announced in early 2016.	Greater Manchester Police found to be at fault. However, in January 2015, William Boyce QC, at Liverpool Crown Court accepted an 'abuse of process' argument from the defence.
Mark Duggan	4 August 2011	London	Metropolitan Police	Direct	Duggan was known to possess illegal firearms. Police stated that officers were attempting to arrest Duggan on suspicion of planning an attack, and possession of a handgun. Duggan died from a gunshot wound to the chest. The killing resulted in public protests in Tottenham, which led to conflict with police and escalated into riots across London and other English cities. In January 2014 a jury returned the verdict of lawful killing.	Lawful killing
Kingsley Burrell	31 March 2011	Birmingham, England	West Midlands Police	Indirect (cardiac arrest following restraint)	Died in hospital as a result of asphyxiation after being detained under the Mental Health Act and left in a face-down position on a hospital bed. One police officer of the West Midlands Police was sacked due to gross misconduct having given a misleading account to investigators. His actions were not found to be contributory to Burrell's death. Injuries from restraint were not found to be the cause of Burrell's death.	Inconclusive
Marc Ringland	3 February 2011	Belfast, Northern Ireland	Police Service of Northern Ireland	Direct	While robbing a petrol station armed with a knife, Ringland threatened an off-duty police officer, who then fired a single shot with his authorised personal protection handgun, fatally wounding him.	Lawful killing
Olaseni Lewis	3 September 2010	London	Metropolitan Police	Indirect (died as a result of restraint by police and medical staff)	After being admitted to a mental health ward, Lewis died 3 days after a period of prolonged restraint by police officers. It was identified that a litany of failures by both police and medical staff contributed to Lewis's death. The misconduct case was dismissed on 6 October 2017 as claims of wrongdoing were "unproven" and any failings were "performance matters".	Narrative conclusion after unlawful killing ruled out by coroner.

=== 2000s ===
Name	Date	Location	Police force	Description
Keith Richards	12 May 2009	Shildon, England	Durham Constabulary	Shot after brandishing a crossbow and urging police to shoot him.
Ian Tomlinson	1 April 2009	London	Metropolitan Police	Tomlinson collapsed and died after being struck by a police officer during the 2009 G-20 summit protests. After an inquest jury returned a verdict of unlawful killing, the officer, Simon Harwood, was prosecuted for manslaughter. He was found not guilty but was dismissed from the police service for gross misconduct.
Mervyn Tussler	8 May 2009	Fernhurst, England	Sussex Police	Tussler fired on police officers from his bed in his sheltered accommodation. Inquest jury returned a verdict of lawful killing.
David Sycamore	30 November 2008	Guildford, England	Surrey Police	Shot after brandishing a replica pistol and saying he would "start shooting people".
Andrew Hammond	29 October 2008	Harold Hill, London	Metropolitan Police	Shot after pointing a replica AK-47 at armed police officers who responded to reports of a man brandishing a firearm in the street.
Sean Rigg	21 August 2008	Brixton, London	Metropolitan Police	Rigg died following a cardiac arrest while in police custody at the entrance to Brixton police station. The Independent Police Complaints Commission concluded that there was no evidence of neglect or wrongdoing and that police had acted "reasonably and proportionately". The case became a cause célèbre for civil rights and justice campaigners in the UK, who called for "improvement and change on a national level" regarding deaths in police custody and police treatment of suspects with mental health issues.
Habib Ullah	3 July 2008	High Wycombe, England	Thames Valley Police	Suffered cardiac arrest whilst being restrained during search.
Ian Terry	9 June 2008	Manchester, England	Greater Manchester Police	Terry, a constable for the Greater Manchester Police, was accidentally shot and killed by another officer during a training exercise.
Mark Saunders	6 May 2008	London	Metropolitan Police	Saunders fired a number of shots from his shotgun from his house at neighbouring houses. On arrival of armed police, he shot at them. After a lengthy standoff, he was shot by police when he pointed his firearm in their direction.
Dayniel Tucker	29 December 2007	Stansted, England	Kent Police	Shot after pointing a replica Uzi sub-machine gun at police.
Ann Sanderson	11 June 2007	Sevenoaks, England	Kent Police	Sanderson was shot in an armed standoff with police while armed with an air pistol. Sanderson had mental health issues and had bought an air gun days before her death. The case was ruled as a lawful killing as Sanderson had instigated the incident.
Terry Nicholas	15 May 2007	Ealing, London	Metropolitan Police	Nicholas fired at police officers and was fatally shot by firearms officers.
Robert Haines	31 October 2006	New Romney, England	Metropolitan Police	Haines undertook an armed robbery and fired at police. Police returned fire. Haines died of his wounds en route to hospital.
Steven Colwell	16 April 2006	Ballynahinch, Northern Ireland	Police Service of Northern Ireland	Shot after attempting to evade a police checkpoint in a stolen car.
Philip Marsden	19 December 2005	Meir, England	Staffordshire Police	Shot after adopting a "firing stance" while carrying an imitation firearm and a sword.
Craig King	11 September 2005	Ashton-under-Lyne, England	Greater Manchester Police	King had been involved in a disturbance where he was destroying property with a machete, before firing shots into a building occupied by unarmed police. On arrival of armed police, King pointed his .22 calibre rifle at them and was shot by police.
Jean Charles de Menezes	22 July 2005	London	Metropolitan Police	Menezes was a Brazilian man killed by officers at Stockwell Station on the London Underground after he was wrongly deemed to be one of the fugitives involved in the previous day's failed bombing attempts. These events took place two weeks after the London bombings of 7 July 2005, in which 52 people were killed. The Independent Police Complaints Commission (IPCC) launched two investigations. In July 2006, the Crown Prosecution Service said that there was insufficient evidence to prosecute any named individual police officers, although a criminal prosecution of the Commissioner in his official capacity on behalf of his police force was brought under the Health and Safety at Work etc. Act 1974, on the failure of the duty of care due to Menezes. The Commissioner was found guilty and his office was fined.
John Mark Scott	16 July 2005	Stocksfield, England	Northumbria Police	Scott assaulted a woman and then barricaded himself in a house. He appeared at an upstairs window with what appeared to be a firearm and was shot by armed police. A loaded firearm and ammunition were recovered from the address.
Azelle Rodney	30 April 2005	London	Metropolitan Police	Rodney was shot six times by police, who stopped the car he was travelling in with two other men. Police had observed them picking up three weapons, believed to be MAC-10 sub-machine guns. After a public inquiry led by Lord Bach, it was found that the killing of Rodney was unlawful and eventually resulted in the case for prosecution of the officer who fired the fatal shots for the charges of murder. The jury found the officer not guilty.
Simon Murden	22 March 2005	Hull, England	Humberside Police	Murden was alleged to have been suffering a psychotic episode. He left his house and drove a van against the flow of traffic, crashing with another vehicle. Murden abandoned the vehicle and brandished a sword. Police shot and killed Murden. An independent inquest ruled it a lawful killing.
Dominic Marron	17 August 2004	Donegal, Ireland	Royal Ulster Constabulary	Died 23 years after being shot in the head by plastic bullet while waiting for a friend outside of a store near Dunville Park on 9 May 1981.
Nicholas Palmer	12 May 2004	Thornton Heath, London	Metropolitan Police	Palmer was killed while on bail for arms offences, his death ruled as being lawful.
Philip Prout	4 May 2004	Cornwall	Devon and Cornwall Police	Prout was reported to have a machete and a firearm and to have made threats to kill. Police attended and surrounded his house and initiated negotiations. Prout emerged from the house brandishing a "samurai sword". Officers attempted to fire a baton gun (which failed to fire twice) before he was shot by police.
Keith Larkins	6 June 2003	Heathrow Airport, London	Metropolitan Police	Larkins, who was reported to be mentally ill, shot blanks from a replica firearm. Two police officers then fired on Larkins, killing him. The incident was ruled as a lawful killing.
Derek Bennett	16 July 2001	Brixton, London	Metropolitan Police	Bennet threatened members of the public with a replica gun, then pointed it at armed police officers who fired on Bennet four times. Bennet had reportedly boasted to friends that the replica was real but on closer inspection it was revealed to be a novelty cigarette lighter. A verdict confirmed the case as a lawful killing.
Andrew Kernan	21 July 2001	Liverpool, England	Merseyside Police	Kernan suffered from schizophrenia and during an episode police were called to his home. He fled and brandished a samurai sword. After a stand-off, two shots were fired and Kernan was killed. After a four-year inquiry the killing was deemed lawful.
Patrick O'Donell	30 October 2000	Islington, London	Metropolitan Police	Shot after taking his mother and girlfriend hostage in a siege.
Kirk Davies	24 September 2000	Wakefield, England	West Yorkshire Police	Davies walked into a police station with an air gun and threatened staff. A manhunt was launched and he was surrounded by armed officers outside Newton Lodge secure psychiatric unit, but Davies ignored repeated requests to give himself up before marksmen opened fire. Davies was regarded as being "emotionally disturbed" and was suffering from posttraumatic stress disorder after fighting in the Croatian Army during the Croatian War of Independence.

=== 1990s ===
Name	Date	Location	Description
Harry Stanley	22 September 1999	London, England	He was returning home from a pub while carrying a table leg, in a plastic bag. Someone reported to police "an Irishman with a gun wrapped in a bag". Near his home, an armed response unit challenged Stanley from behind. As he turned to face them, they shot him dead from 15 feet (5 m).
Derek Bateman	22 June 1999	Surrey, England	Shot after his girlfriend told officers he was armed and was threatening to shoot her, or himself.
Anthony Kitts	10 April 1999	Falmouth, Cornwall	Shot after repeatedly aiming an air rifle at police.
Christopher Alder	1 April 1998	Kingston upon Hull, England	Unlawfully killed by asphyxiation, having been placed unconscious and handcuffed on the floor of a police station.
Michael Fitzgerald	February 1998	Bedford, England	Shot after aiming a replica Colt 45 at police, in his home, after he was mistaken for an armed burglar.
James Ashley	15 January 1998	St Leonards-on-Sea, England	Shot at his flat while unarmed and naked during a raid by armed officers. The officer responsible was charged with murder and acquitted, and several senior officers were charged or disciplined.
John Hemsworth	7 July 1997	Belfast, Northern Ireland	Beaten by a group of RUC constables while walking home after a riot, died several months later from a stroke on 1 January 1998.
David Howell	November 1996	Birmingham, England	Psychiatric patient shot in at a Co-op supermarket.
Diarmuid O'Neill	23 September 1996	London, England	IRA member, shot during police raid.
John Christopher Gardiner	10 May 1996	Blackburn, England	Died of heart failure while in police custody following a struggle during his arrest.
Ibrahim Sey	16 March 1996	Ilford, England	Died in Ilford police station. His wife had called police because he appeared to be having a mental breakdown. He was sprayed with CS gas, and four police officers restrained him, face down on the ground, for 15 minutes. When they noticed he was not breathing, an ambulance was called; when the ambulance arrived, he was dead, face down and wearing handcuffs.
David Ewin	April 1995	London, England	Former robber killed in a stolen car. Officer was tried and cleared of murder.
James Brady	April 1995	Newcastle, England	Shot in a police ambush.
Richard O'Brien	4 April 1994	London, England	Died at Walworth Police Station after being arrested for being drunk and disorderly. An officer said O'Brien stopped breathing after holding him face down on the ground with his knee on O'Brien's back. The officer began mouth-to-mouth resuscitation while an ambulance was called. The three officers involved were found not guilty of manslaughter. The prosecution alleged the officers used too much force to hold down O'Brien for more than five minutes, during which time he died of postural asphyxia. However, a pathologist for the defence said O'Brien had a heart attack due to his size and enlarged heart.
Robin Maxwell	27 January 1994	Donaghadee, Northern Ireland	Protestant civilian, shot during attempted robbery at filling station.
David Stone	15 October 1993	London, England	After a bank robbery, Stone hijacked a garbage truck, but later abandoned it after his path was blocked. He fired shots at police officers and was shot in the head by a policeman. His stepson said that Stone was deaf and may not have heard warnings from the police.
Ian Fitzgerald-Hay	13 October 1993	near Moreleigh, England	Shot by a policeman after killing a police dog with a pistol and pointing the gun at officers.
Joy Gardner	1 August 1993	Crouch End, London	Gardner died after being detained during a police immigration raid on her home in Crouch End, when she was restrained with handcuffs and leather straps and gagged with a 13-foot length of adhesive tape wrapped around her head. Unable to breathe, she collapsed and suffered brain damage due to asphyxia. She was placed on life support but died following a cardiac arrest four days later. In 1995, three of the police officers involved stood trial for Gardner's manslaughter, but were acquitted.
David Luckhurt	18 April 1993	Cheshunt, Hertfordshire	Shot at the end of a four-hour siege, after firing at officers surrounding his home.
Leon Patterson	27 November 1992	Manchester, England	Died in police custody. MP Harry Michael Cohen said, "Leon Patterson, 31, was detained on remand at Stockport police station in November 1992. After six days he was transferred to Denton police station, where he died a few hours later. Covered in bruises, he received no proper medical treatment despite suffering diarrhoea and vomiting for several days. He was heavily dosed with Mogadon. The inquest said that he was unlawfully killed and that a failure of duty contributed to or caused his death; yet no one was prosecuted".
Pearse Jordan	25 November 1992	Belfast, Northern Ireland	IRA member, shot immediately after his car was stopped by an undercover Royal Ulster Constabulary mobile patrol.
Arthur Stewart	17 May 1992	Clydebank, Scotland	Was shot after becoming inebriated and going to his ex-girlfriend's house with a shotgun, then engaging in a siege. He was shot by Strathclyde Police marksmen and later died.
Gerard Maginn	3 November 1991	Belfast, Northern Ireland	Catholic civilian, shot in the back of a stolen car.
Kevin McGovern	29 September 1991	Cookstown, Northern Ireland	Catholic civilian, shot by an undercover officer.
Colm Marks	10 April 1991	Downpatrick, Northern Ireland	IRA member, shot while preparing a mortar bomb.

=== 1980s ===
- Ian Johnston (9 November 1989 in Belfast, Northern Ireland) – RUC constable, shot in a raid on his home.
- Seamus Duffy (9 August 1989 in Belfast, Northern Ireland) – Catholic civilian, shot by plastic bullet.
- Keith White (14 April 1986 in Portadown, Northern Ireland) – Protestant civilian, shot by plastic bullet during a riot.
- Cherry Groce (28 September 1985 in Lambeth, London)
- John Shorthouse (24 August 1985 in Birmingham, England)
- John Mikkelson, misadventure (July 1985 in London)
- Henry Foley (12 February 1985 in Southport, England) – severely beaten in police cell by officer, died of injuries in hospital. First time a UK police officer was convicted for a death in custody.
- Gerard Logue (8 February 1985 in Belfast, Northern Ireland) – shot while sitting in a stolen car.
- Sean McIlvenna (17 December 1984 in Blackwatertown, Northern Ireland) – IRA member, shot after being involved in a roadside bomb attack.
- Sean Downes (12 August 1984 in Belfast, Northern Ireland) – ex-IRA member, shot by plastic bullet during protest march.
- Paul McCann (15 June 1984 in Belfast, Northern Ireland) – INLA member, shot during gun battle after police surrounded a house.
- Seamus Fitzsimmons (14 May 1984 in Ballygally, Northern Ireland) – Catholic civilian, shot during attempted post office robbery.
- Anthony Dawson (12 December 1983 in Belfast, Northern Ireland) – Catholic civilian, killed in drive-by shooting by an off-duty police officer.
- Brigid Foster (28 November 1983 in Pomeroy, Northern Ireland) – passerby, shot after armed robbery at post office.
- John O'Hare (26 July 1983 in Lurgan, Northern Ireland) – Catholic civilian, shot while running away after armed post office robbery.
- William Miller (16 March 1983 in Belfast, Northern Ireland) – UVF member, shot while travelling in stolen car.
- Frank McColgan (20 January 1983 in Dunmurry, Northern Ireland) – Catholic civilian, shot during car chase.
- Michael Tighe (24 November 1982 in Derrymacash, Northern Ireland) – Catholic civilian, shot by undercover officers at a farm.
- Ronald Brennan (28 September 1982 in Newtownabbey, Northern Ireland) – Protestant civilian, shot during attempted post office robbery.
- Stephen Hamilton (19 October 1981 in Belfast, Northern Ireland) – UDA member, shot while travelling in stolen car.
- Peter McGuinness (9 August 1981 in Belfast, Northern Ireland) – Catholic civilian, died after being shot by plastic bullet.
- Nora McCabe (9 July 1981 in Belfast, Northern Ireland) – Catholic civilian, died after being shot by plastic bullet.
- Paul Whitters (25 April 1981 in Derry, Northern Ireland) – Catholic civilian, died after being shot by plastic bullet.
- Michael McCartan (24 July 1980 in Belfast, Northern Ireland) – Catholic civilian, shot by undercover officer.
- Terence O'Neill (1 July 1980 in Belfast, Northern Ireland) – IRA member, shot while running away from a community centre.
- Gail Kinchen (Shot 11 June 1980 in Birmingham, England. Died 4 weeks later) - Whilst being used as a human shield by David Pagett, Pagett discharged his shotgun, police officers returned fire hitting Gail three times.

=== 1970s ===
- James Kelly, killed in police custody (21 June 1979 in Liverpool, England)
- Blair Peach (died 24 April 1979 in London, England)
- William Strathearn (19 April 1977 in Ahoghill, Northern Ireland) – shot at his home by off-duty officers.
- William "Billy" Hughes (14 January 1977, Rainow, Cheshire) – escaped prisoner, and mass murderer, shot dead by police marksman following a high speed pursuit.
- Edward Walker (11 June 1976 in Newtownabbey, Northern Ireland) – UDA member, shot while travelling in stolen car.
- Sean McDermott (5 April 1976 in Dunmurry, Northern Ireland) – IRA member, shot shortly after carrying out bomb attack on a hotel.
- Liddle Towers (9 February 1976 in Dryburn Hospital, County Durham, England) - died of injuries inflicted during a beating by police in cells.
- Michael McVerry (15 November 1973 in Keady, Northern Ireland) – IRA member, shot during attack on police/army base.
- Michael Leonard (17 May 1973 in Pettigo, Northern Ireland) – shot while driving his car being chased by police.
- Albert Kavanagh (4 March 1972 in Belfast, Northern Ireland) – IRA member, shot during attempted bomb attack on factory.
- Joseph Cunningham (10 February 1972 in Newtownabbey, Northern Ireland) – IRA member, shot during gun battle.
- Martin Forsythe (24 October 1971 in Belfast Northern Ireland) – IRA member, shot by undercover officers during bomb attack.

=== 1960s ===
- Michael Lynch (15 August 1969 in Belfast, Northern Ireland) – Catholic civilian, shot during the 1969 Northern Ireland riots.
- Samuel McLarnon (15 August 1969 in Belfast, Northern Ireland) – Catholic civilian, shot during the 1969 Northern Ireland riots.
- Hugh McCabe (15 August 1969 in Belfast, Northern Ireland) – British soldier on leave, shot while standing on a roof during the 1969 Northern Ireland riots.
- Patrick Rooney (14 August 1969 in Belfast, Northern Ireland) – 9-year-old boy shot during the 1969 Northern Ireland riots.
- John Gallagher (14 August 1969 in Armagh, Northern Ireland) – Catholic civilian, shot during the 1969 Northern Ireland riots.
- Samuel Devenney (17 July 1969 in Derry, Northern Ireland) – Catholic civilian, died three months after being badly beaten by officers inside his home during a riot.
- James Griffiths (15 July 1969 in Glasgow, Scotland)
- Francis McCloskey (14 July 1969 in Dungiven, Northern Ireland) – Catholic civilian, died after being hit on head with batons during a riot.
- Michael Joseph Ahern (9 September 1968 in London, England) - died after being beaten by police officers whilst handcuffed in Nine Elms Police Station.

=== Before the 1960s ===
- James Crossan (24 August 1958 in Mullan, County Fermanagh, Northern Ireland) – IRA member shot at border customs post during the Border Campaign.
- Aloysius Hand (2 July 1958 in Clontivern, County Fermanagh, Northern Ireland) – IRA member killed in gun battle during the Border Campaign.
- James McKeown (11 May 1922 in Ballyronan, Northern Ireland) – Catholic civilian, shot in his home along with two brothers by Ulster Special Constables.
- Mary McGowan (11 July 1921 in Belfast, Northern Ireland) – 13-year-old Catholic girl, shot by Ulster Special Constables firing from an armoured car during Belfast's Bloody Sunday. The inquest concluded that they had "deliberately" shot her.
- Percy Toplis (6 June 1920 in Cumberland, England)
- Maud Smith (7 June 1893 at Wormwood Scrubs, London) was killed by PC George Cooke, who was subsequently convicted of her murder and hanged.
- Michael Wise (24 August 1687 in Salisbury)

== Multiple deaths in a single incident ==
Names	Date	Location	Description
Adrian Daulby (victim); Jihad al-Shamie (attacker)	2 October 2025	Crumpsall, Greater Manchester	During the Manchester synagogue attack, Daulby and another man stood behind the doors of the synagogue, stopping an attacker from gaining entry. When police arrived and fired at the suspect, both men were accidentally hit, along with the suspect. Daulby and al-Shamie were killed.
Khuram Shazad Butt; Rachid Redouane; Youssef Zaghba	3 June 2017	Southwark, London	Terrorists shot during the 2017 London Bridge attack
Mark Nunes; Andrew Markland	13 September 2007	Chandler's Ford, Hampshire	Armed robbers (see Chandler's Ford shooting). Nunes was shot by police when he aimed a handgun at the head of a security guard during a cash delivery. Markland was shot after he picked up Nunes's weapon.
Darren Franey; Scott Veach	2 March 2002	Liverpool, England	Two 14-year-old boys killed after hitting a HGV vehicle, that Mersey Tunnels Police attempted to use as a rolling road block in order to stop them at approximately 100 Mph in a stolen vehicle. An inquiry led to the verdict of unlawful killing and led to Mersey Tunnels Police officers having to go through the same standard of police training as other police forces. Five officers were suspended for the incident however none of them faced any criminal charges. The incident led many to call for the policing of the tunnels to be transferred to Merseyside Police.
Patrick Loughran; Patrick McBride; Michael O'Dwyer	4 February 1992	Belfast, Northern Ireland	1992 Sinn Féin Headquarters shooting: Catholic civilians shot by an off-duty Royal Ulster Constabulary (RUC) officer, Constable Allen Moore, in a Sinn Féin office in Belfast. The officer entered the building disguised as a journalist before opening fire with a shotgun. He killed himself shortly after.
Michael Flynn; Nicholas Payne	15 July 1987	Plumstead, London	Shot by police during an attempted armed robbery of a wages van at an abattoir in Shooters Hill. The marksman feared for the life of the van driver and fired on three of the assailants. Two died at the scene; the third was injured by gunfire but survived.
Brendan Convery; James Mallon	13 August 1983	Dungannon, Northern Ireland	Irish National Liberation Army (INLA) members, shot while launching a gun attack on a Royal Ulster Constabulary (RUC) guard hut.
Seamus Grew; Rodney Carroll	12 December 1982	Armagh, Northern Ireland	Irish National Liberation Army (INLA) members, shot by undercover officers at a vehicle checkpoint. See shoot-to-kill policy in Northern Ireland.
Sean Burns; Gervaise McKerr; Eugene Toman	11 November 1982	Craigavon, Northern Ireland	Provisional Irish Republican Army (IRA) members, shot by undercover officers at a vehicle checkpoint. See shoot-to-kill policy in Northern Ireland.
Michael Herbert; Michael Cotton	20 March 1974	Markethill, Northern Ireland	British soldiers, shot by mistake. They had been driving civilian vehicles when they were shot by Royal Ulster Constabulary (RUC) officers, who believed the soldiers were paramilitaries.
Michael Connors; John Mahon	1 March 1972	Belfast, Northern Ireland	Irish Travellers, shot during a police chase while in a stolen van.
Fergal O'Hanlon; Seán South	1 January 1957	Brookeborough, Northern Ireland	Irish Republican Army (IRA) members shot while launching an attack on a Royal Ulster Constabulary (RUC) base during the Border Campaign.
Seamus McAllister; John Gore; John Hill	23 June 1922	Cushendall, Northern Ireland	A group of Ulster Special Constables opened fire on civilians in the village while preparing to enforce a nightly curfew. Special Constables summarily executed three young Catholic men by shooting them at close range. They claimed they were ambushed by the IRA and returned fire, but a British government inquiry concluded that this was not true. The report was not made public for almost a century.
Thomas Crawley; Patrick Creggan	13 June 1922	Lislea, Northern Ireland	Ulster Special Constables forced the two Catholic men into the back of a police truck in Bessbrook. Their bodies were found riddled with bullets a few miles away.
Charlie McAllister; Pat McVeigh	24 May 1922	Glenariff, Northern Ireland	Two Irish Republican Army (IRA) volunteers killed in a firefight with the Ulster Special Constabulary.
Francis Higgins; John Higgins Jnr; Henry McGeehan; James McGeehan	19 May 1922	Desertmartin, Northern Ireland	In revenge for the burning of a Protestant-owned mill, Ulster Special Constables took four Catholic men from their homes nearby, lined them up by the roadside and summarily executed them.
John Mallon; Bernard McKenna; John McRory; William Spallen; Joseph Walsh; Michael Walsh	1 April 1922	Belfast, Northern Ireland	Arnon Street killings: Men in police uniform, believed to be Ulster Special Constables, broke into Catholic homes, shooting and beating six people to death, including a 7-year-old boy. It was believed to be in revenge for the Irish Republican Army (IRA) killing of a policeman.
Owen McMahon; Bernard McMahon; Frank McMahon; Gerard McMahon; Patrick McMahon; Edward McKinney	24 March 1922	Belfast, Northern Ireland	McMahon killings: Men in police uniform, believed to be Ulster Special Constables, broke into the home of a Catholic family and shot all males inside, killing six. It was believed to be in revenge for the Irish Republican Army (IRA) killing of two policemen.
Peter McGinnity; John O'Reilly; Thomas O'Reilly; Patrick Quinn	6 July 1921	Altnaveigh, Ireland	Men believed to be Ulster Special Constables took four Catholic men from their homes near Newry "for questioning" and summarily executed them.
Owen Magill; Stephen Magill	8 June 1921	Corrogs, Ireland	The Irish Republican Army (IRA) ambushed an Ulster Special Constabulary patrol at Carrogs, near Newry. In reprisal, Special Constables went to the nearest farmhouse and fatally shot two Catholic brothers. The IRA fired on the Specials from a nearby hill, killing one and forcing them to withdraw.

== See also ==
- Lists of killings by law enforcement officers
- Police use of firearms in the United Kingdom
- Shoot-to-kill policy in Northern Ireland
- Suicide by cop
