= Cash-in-transit =

Physical transfer of money between locations

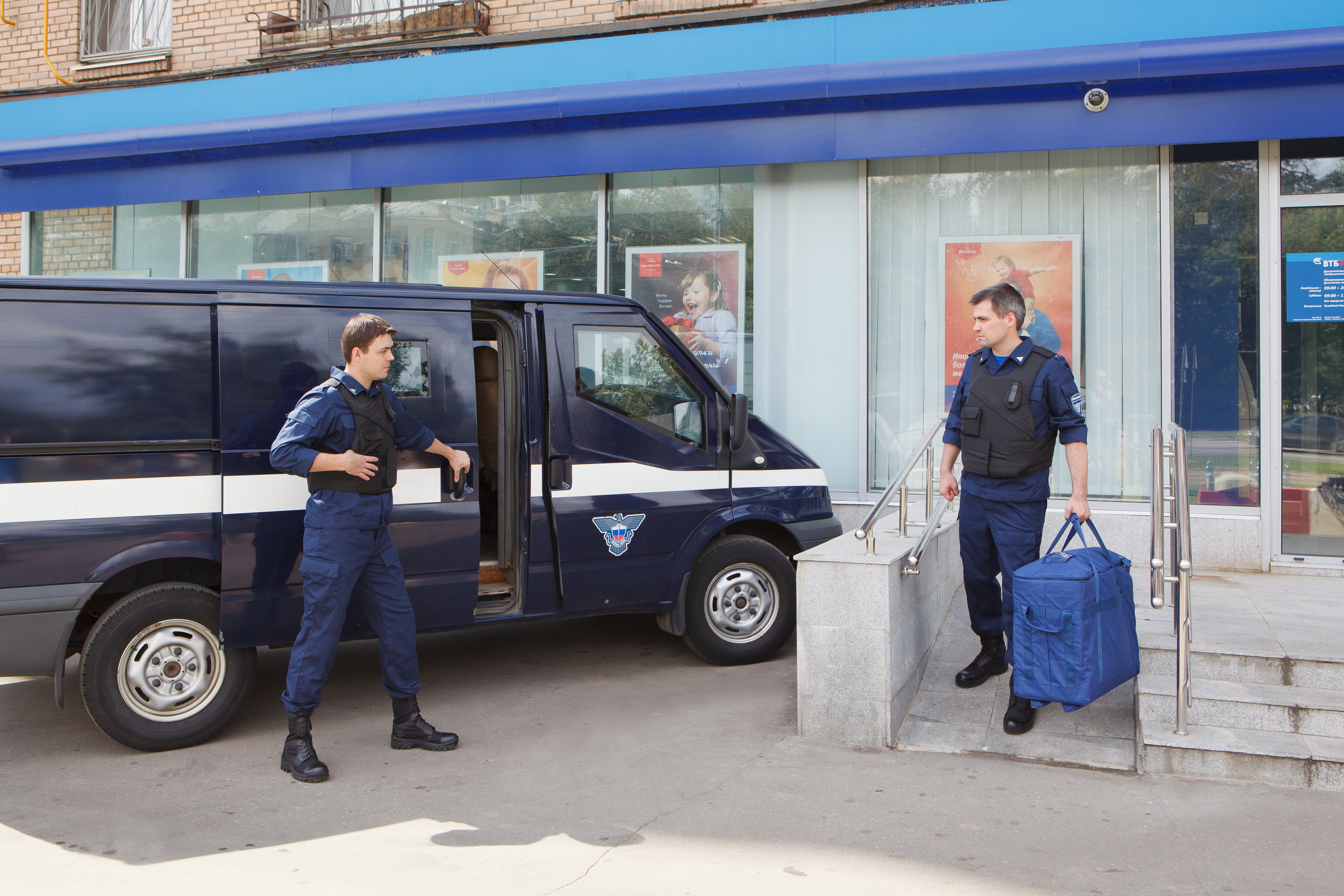
Transfer of cash from a VTB Bank branch in Russia

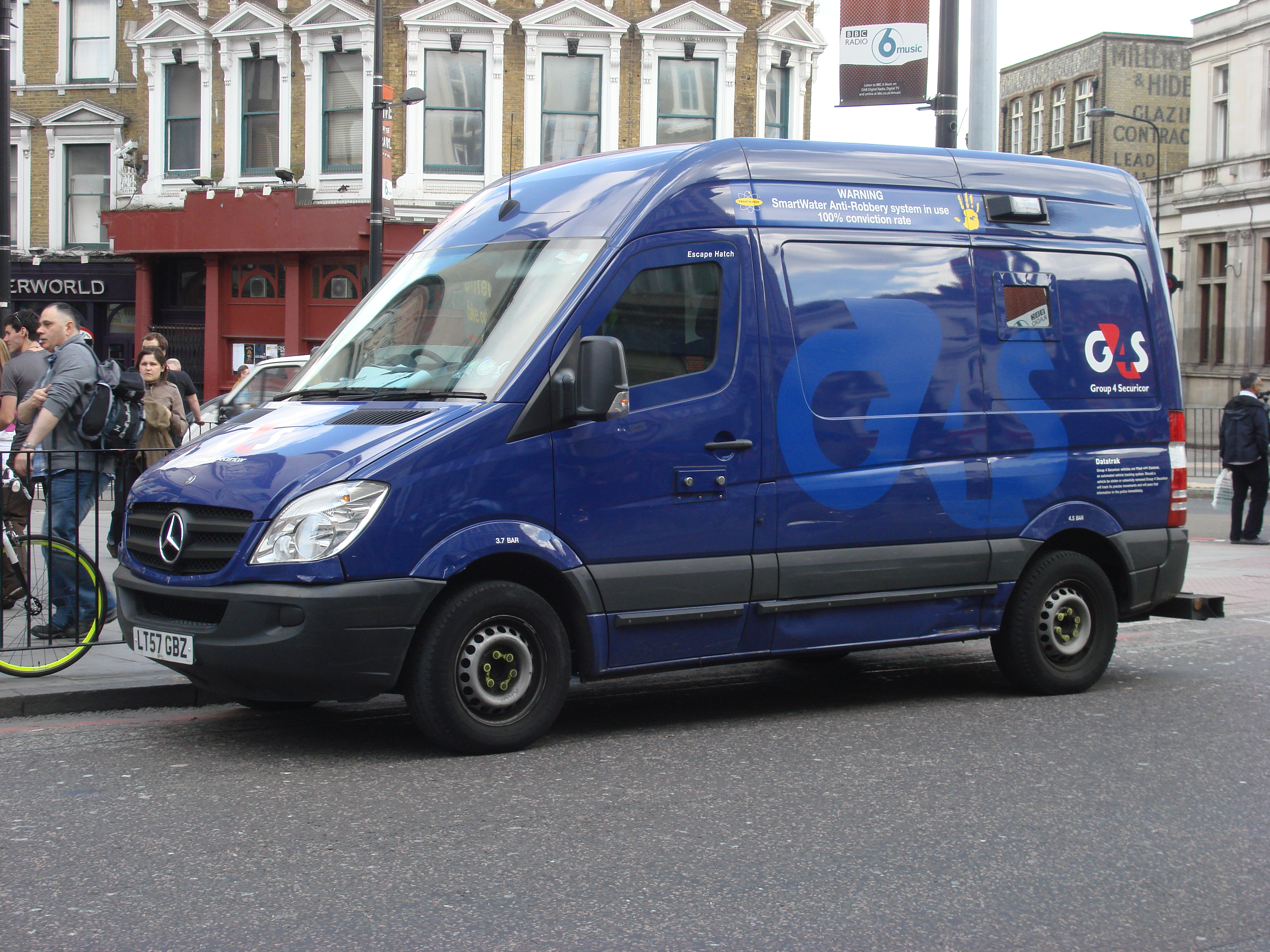
G4S Cash Services CVIT van in London, UK

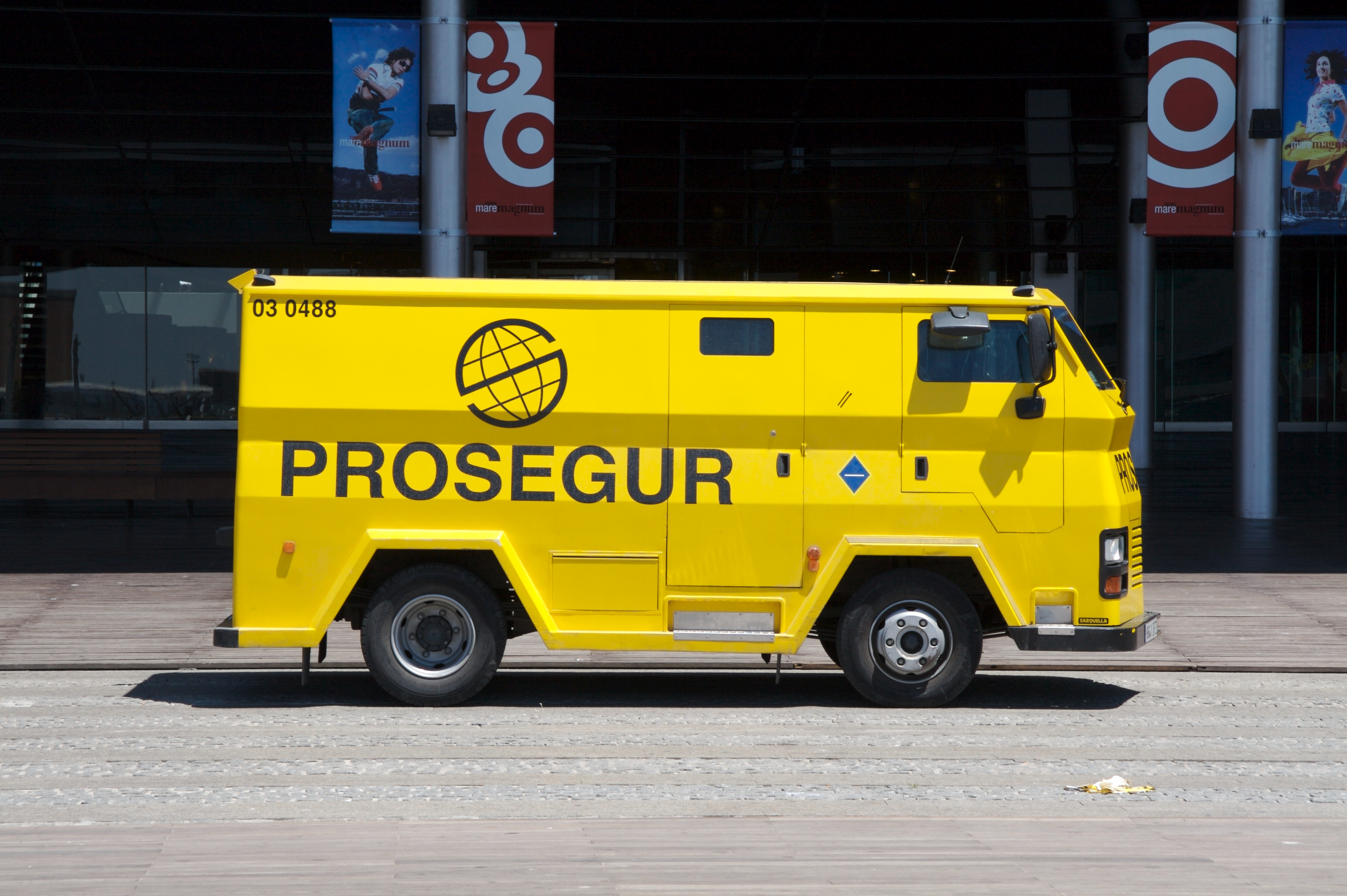
Prosegur armored car in Barcelona, Spain

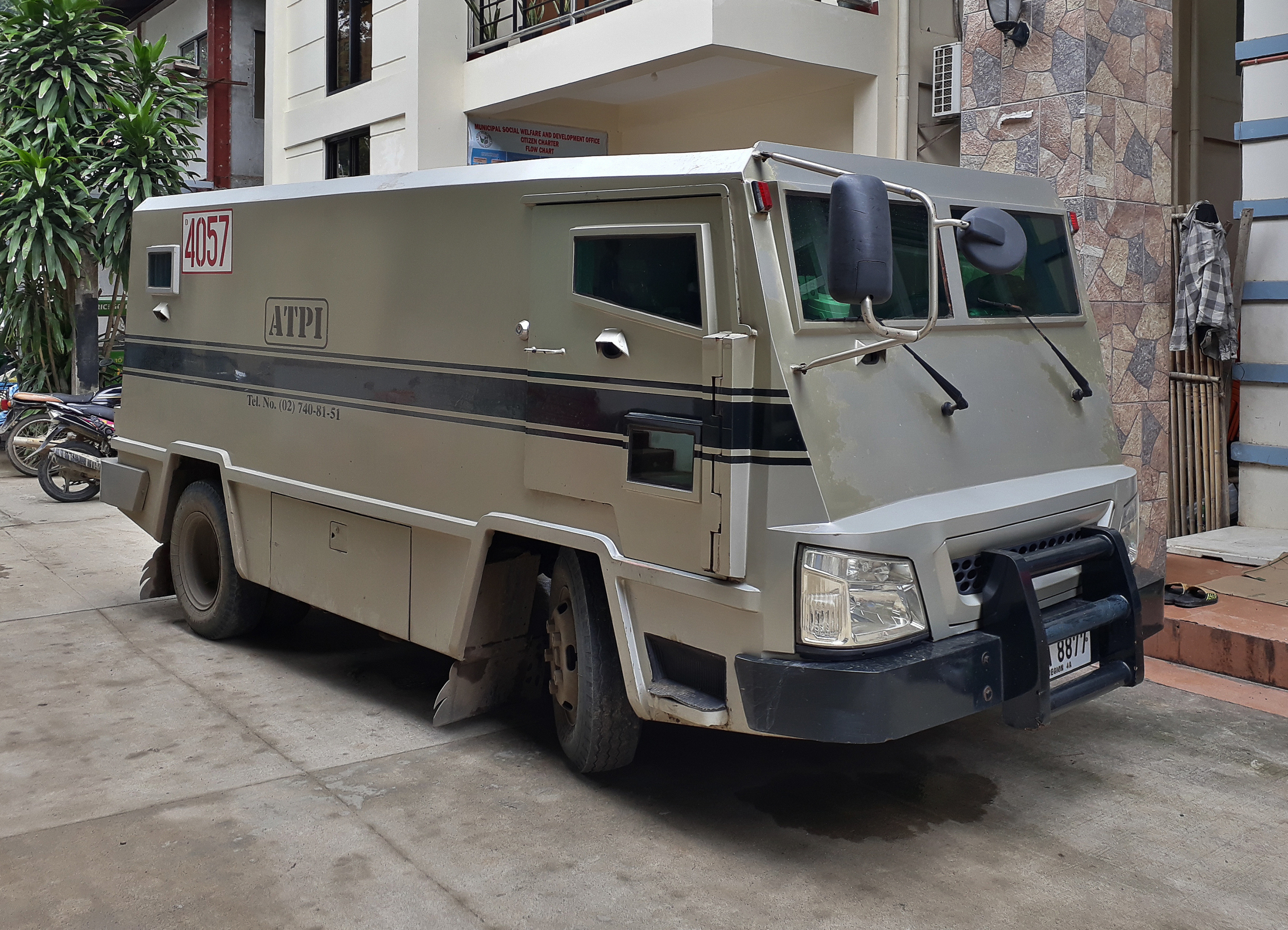
CTK armored van in the Philippines

Cash-in-transit (CIT) or cash/valuables-in-transit (CVIT) is the physical transfer of banknotes, coins, credit cards and items of value from one location to another. The locations include cash centers and bank branches, ATM points, bureaux de change, large retailers and other premises holding large amounts of cash, such as ticket vending machines and parking meters.

Many cash-in-transit companies are private security companies that offer cash handling as part of their services. Loomis, following its split from Securitas, and Shields Business Solutions, a private equity backed company, are the only major CIT businesses fully dedicated to cash handling. Brink's spun off its home security division, likewise placing its focus on cash handling.

By law, the CIT companies are seen as logistics companies in the private security industry and therefore have to comply with transport and security legislation. In some countries, the transportation of cash has its own legislation (for example, Europe has varying CIT laws). The CIT industry is regulated by national, regional and local legislation, social regulations and current practices. Responsible authorities are usually the Ministry of the Interior, the Ministry of Justice and the police. Legislation and regulations may impose requirements and restrictions on use of firearms, types of vehicles, minimum number of crew members, and use of intelligent banknote neutralisation systems.

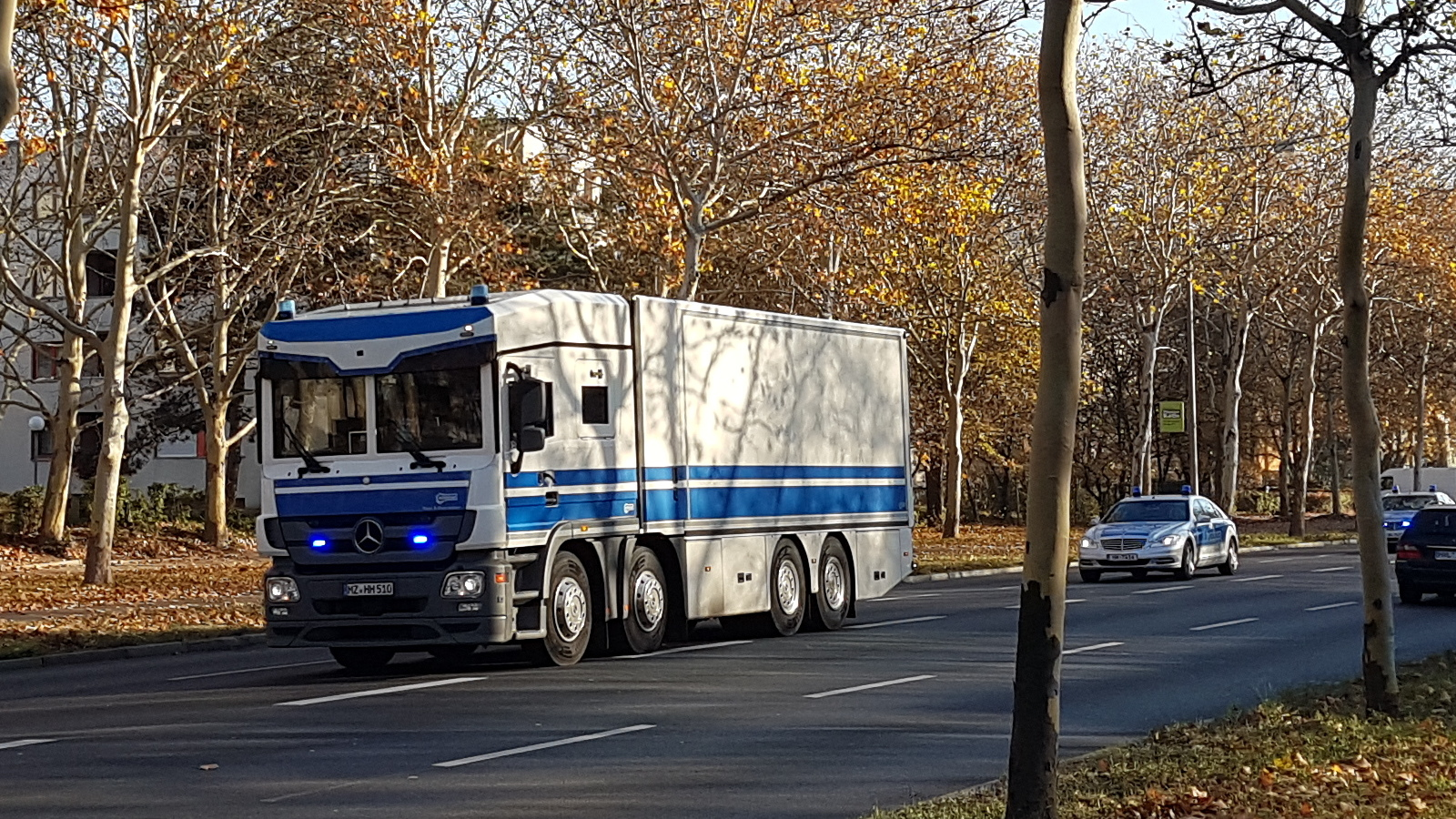
Public money transfer of the Deutsche Bundesbank with an armored Mercedes-Benz Actros and Mercedes W221 S-Guard support vehicles

CIT services can be carried out in soft-skinned, semi-armoured or armoured vehicles. The use of soft-skinned vehicles is normally only allowed when alternative security methods, such as intelligent banknote neutralisation systems, are also used. Security cases containing IBNS are provided by companies as StrongPoint Cash Security and Oberthür. Such CIT is commonly referred to as "Light CIT".

== Services ==
Inside CIT, the companies are specialized in the transportation and processing of cash, valuables and precious metals. They transport banknotes, coins, bulk cash, diamonds, non-personalised smart cards, non-personalised passports and other valuables. That is why, in many countries, the service was renamed "asset handling" or "asset-in-transit".

== Cash processing ==
Cash processing is an industrial process far removed from traditional banking activities and culture. The internal organization of cash handling within banks is often obsolete and inefficient, inherited from old bank organizations and further complicated by mergers, acquisitions and restructuring. This has led the majority of banks to opt for the outsourcing of wholesale cash processing which includes coin and banknote processing.

There are on the other hand inherent difficulties associated with outsourcing. One of them is the loss of control and the reliance on external providers. In some cases, banks no longer have the know-how in relation to cash handling.

Cash processing has evolved from a labor-intensive activity focused on the transportation of cash to a capital-intensive industry offering end-to end solutions. Transport no longer constitutes the value added in the business but continues to structure the organization. The CIT's footprint remains a key factor of selection by banks and retailers.

The industry is generally divided into two sectors: processing and ATM servicing.

== CIT guards ==
Most armored cars have two to three occupants:

- A driver, who is normally never allowed to leave the vehicle until it returns to the garage
- 1–2 guards who deliver the cash or valuables

Depending on the jurisdiction, the guards are armed with weapons and required to wear bulletproof vests and/or ballistic helmets. Most guards are issued with shotguns, while others carry handguns. Submachine guns and even assault rifles may be equipped by those officers in some countries. These guards are required to have firearms training before they can carry them.

Five member states of the European Union—Denmark, Greece, Ireland, Sweden, and the Netherlands—prohibit weapons during cash-in-transit operations.

== See also ==
- Chandler's Ford shooting
- Great Train Robbery (1963)
