= Northolt siege =

1985 hostage-taking in London

Coordinates: 51°32′08″N 0°23′15″W

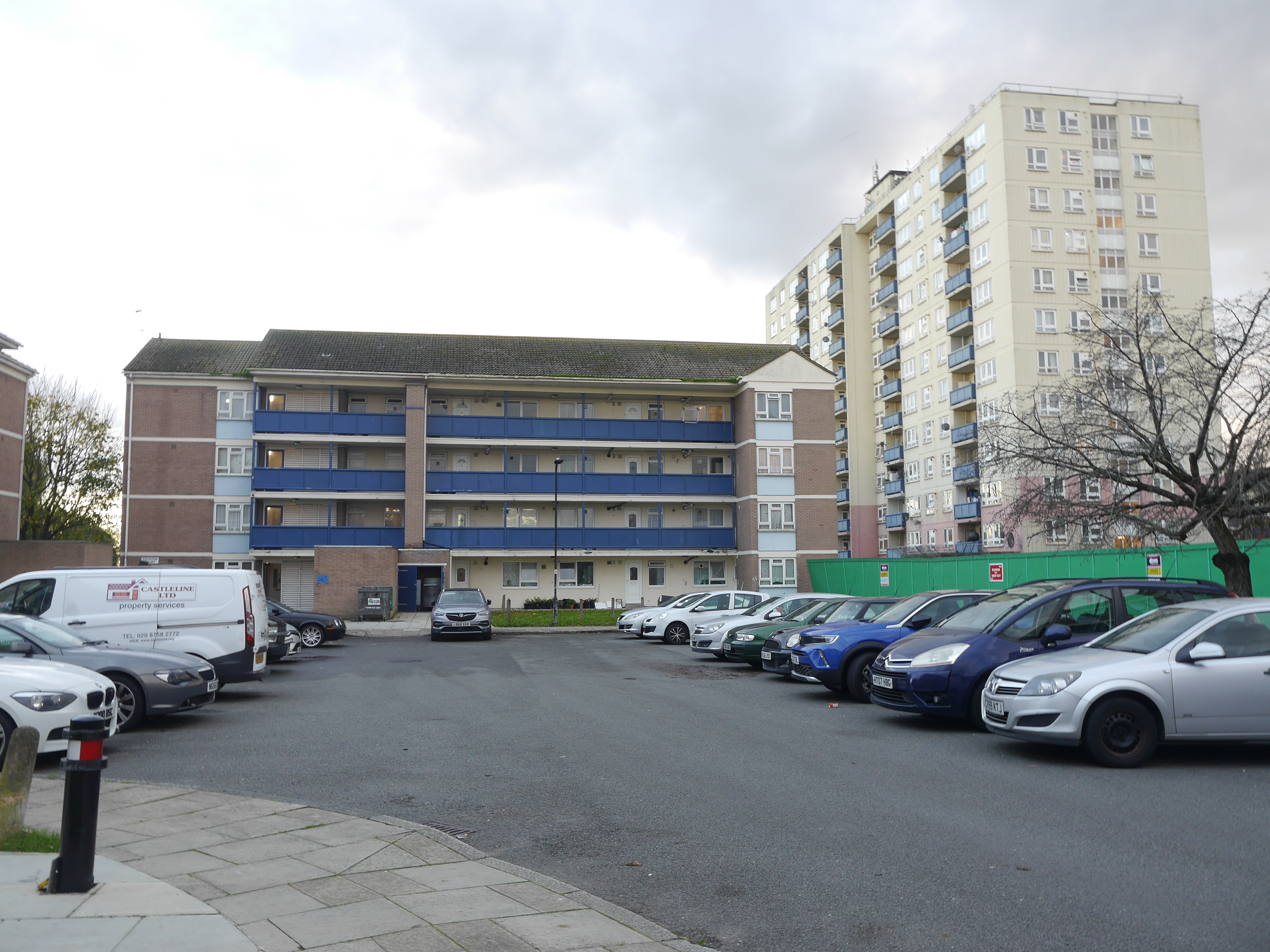
Poynter Court, where the siege took place, photographed in 2022

The Northolt siege took place in Northolt, West London, England, on 25 and 26 December 1985. It resulted in the shooting of the hostage-taker, Errol Walker. It was the first shooting by an officer from the Metropolitan Police's specialist Firearms Wing. After a domestic dispute, Walker forced entry into his sister-in-law's flat. He took the woman, her daughter, and his own daughter hostage and shortly afterwards fatally stabbed the woman. Negotiations eventually secured the release of Walker's daughter, but he still held the child of his murdered sister-in-law hostage with a large kitchen knife.

Senior police officers were keen to resolve the situation without the use of force and adopted a policy of appeasing Walker, which included withdrawing armed officers from Walker's vision. Almost 30 hours into the siege, Walker ventured onto the communal balcony to pick up an abandoned riot shield. Armed police officers attempted to intercept him but he made it back to the flat before they reached him. The officers threw stun grenades through the windows and climbed through the kitchen window. One officer, Tony Long, found Walker lying on a sofa, holding the knife to the child, and fired three shots, hitting Walker twice.

Walker was knocked unconscious but both he and the girl survived. He was sentenced to life imprisonment for murder, attempted murder, and other offences. Although the Firearms Wing had existed for almost 20 years, Northolt marked the first time one of its officers had opened fire, and the first use of stun grenades by British police. The incident demonstrated the unit's capabilities, which it had been developing for several years. One historian of the unit felt that the incident showed that the police had an alternative for crises that could not be resolved peacefully.

== Background ==
British police officers do not routinely carry firearms. In 1985, armed support was provided by authorised local officers who underwent basic weapons-handling training and could access weapons when authorised by a senior officer. In London, the Metropolitan Police ("the Met") also had a Firearms Wing, designated D11—a team of specialist armed officers established following the shooting deaths of three police officers in 1966. D11 trained many of the local authorised officers and could be called upon to handle complex incidents. Throughout the 1970s and into the 1980s, D11 was professionalising and developing its capabilities.

Armed policing was a sensitive subject in 1985. Senior officers were keen to preserve the image of an unarmed police force and often prohibited the overt carrying of weapons. D11's capabilities were not widely publicised, even within the Met, and officers responsible for managing major incidents often did not hold the unit in high regard. Further, the Northolt siege took place less than three months after a black woman was accidentally shot and paralysed in Brixton, South London, during a police raid on her home by officers looking for her son. That shooting sparked two days of rioting.

Errol Walker was born in Jamaica in 1956 and emigrated to England in 1968 where he became a career criminal. He had a lengthy criminal record, predominantly in theft and burglary. He married Marlene in 1982 and the couple had a daughter. Walker continued to commit crimes, expanding to include armed robberies. He was convicted of robbery, possession of a firearm, and false imprisonment later in 1982 and sentenced to five years' imprisonment. Walker became a police informant and was given an early release in 1985. He and his wife and daughter moved to Northolt, West London. According to neighbours, he was often violent towards Marlene. After a domestic incident which left her requiring hospital treatment, Marlene took their daughter to stay with her sister, Jacqueline, in her flat at Poynter Court in Gallery Gardens. Walker visited Marlene and the four-year-old child multiple times over several weeks but was refused entry into Jacqueline's flat.

== Siege ==
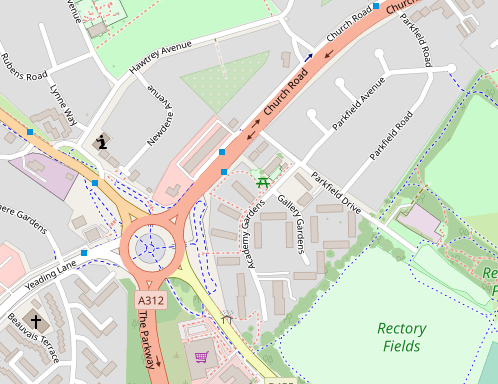
Map of the area with Poynter Court marked

On 24 December 1985, Walker arrived uninvited at Jacqueline's flat and persuaded Marlene to return home with him. There, he threatened Marlene with a knife, beat her, and repeatedly raped her. He returned her to Gallery Gardens the following morning, Christmas Day, and ordered her to collect their daughter but instead she went to a neighbouring flat to call the police. As two police officers arrived, they observed Walker climbing through a front window into Jacqueline's flat. Armed with a large kitchen knife, he took Jacqueline, her daughter, and his own daughter hostage. Once the police officers approached the flat, Walker came to the window, holding Jacqueline at knifepoint. He demanded that the police officers bring Marlene to him and threatened to kill Jacqueline if they refused. One officer left and returned with Marlene while the other attempted to reason with Walker. A few minutes into the negotiations, Walker slashed and stabbed Jacqueline multiple times and pushed her out of the front door onto the balcony. She was taken to hospital by ambulance but was pronounced dead on arrival.

Additional police units soon arrived, including a specialist firearms team from D11. The first officers on the scene continued to attempt negotiations with Walker, who was prone to extreme mood swings. They brought Marlene to the window; Walker attempted to drag her into the flat and became further enraged when she managed to resist him. He repeatedly held the children out of a rear window, threatening to drop them, which prompted firefighters to set up blankets underneath in case it was necessary to catch them. Walker eventually released his daughter but continued to hold the other child, threatening to kill her. At one point, he cut the girl's hand and dangled her over the balcony, causing her blood to drip onto the firefighters. He later tied the girl to a chair and put a plastic bag over her head. The police gave Walker one of their radios to ease communication though he apparently used this to beat the girl. He also threatened to electrocute her with a wire he cut from a kettle.

From an early point in the police operation, senior officers were determined to negotiate a peaceful outcome. D11 snipers were positioned in an overlooking building but were under orders not to fire except on the instructions of police commanders. Armed officers were also positioned in neighbouring flats but were later pulled back to the ends of the balcony in an attempt to appease Walker; they were instructed not to intervene if Walker appeared on the balcony. By the evening of Christmas Day, Walker was demanding the police bring him Marlene in exchange for the girl. Overnight, he barricaded the front door with the refrigerator.

== Rescue ==
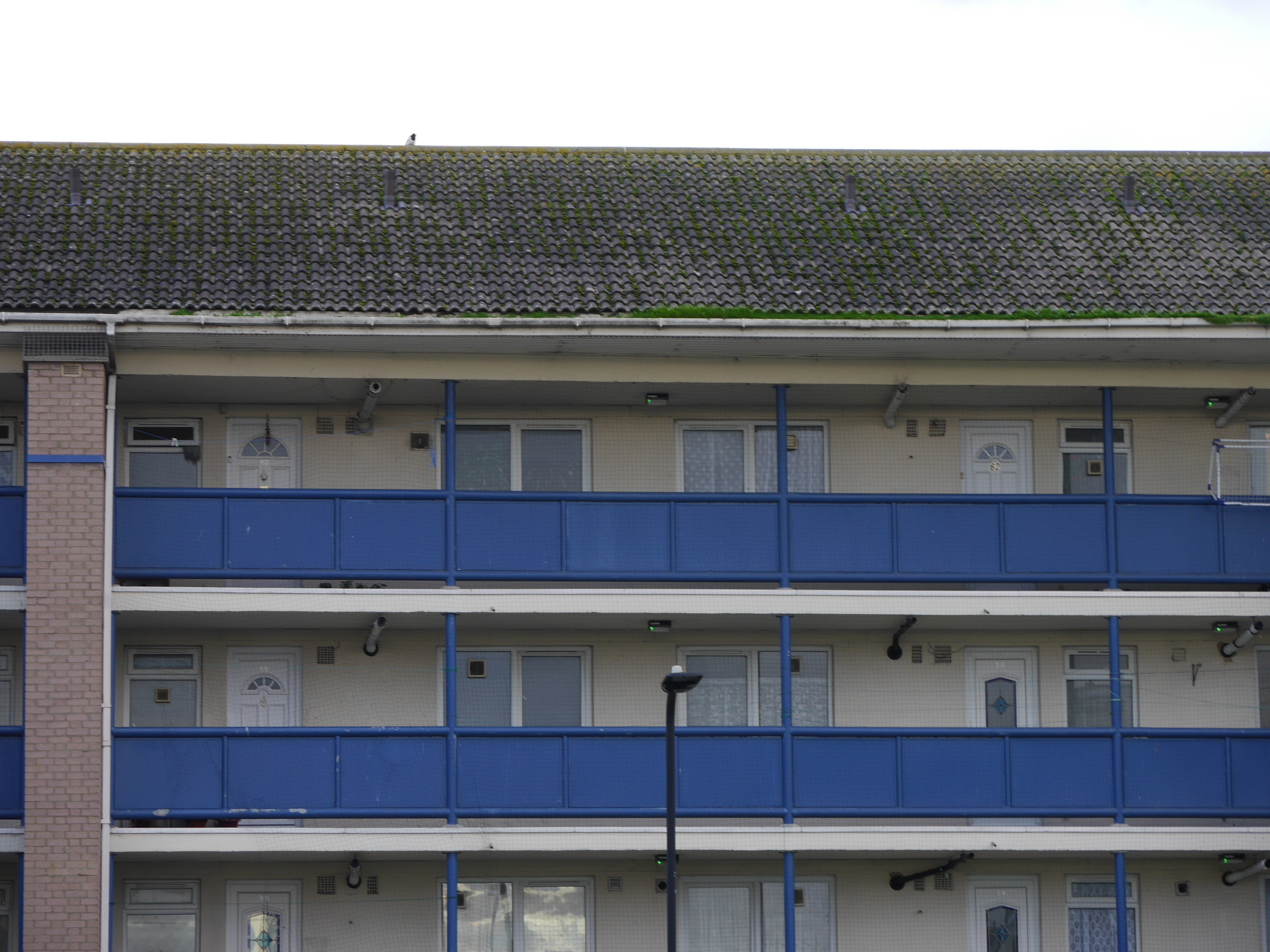
Close-up of the balconies of Poynter Court, where the incident unfolded

On 26 December, Walker appeared on the balcony with the knife. He peered into the window of a neighbouring flat, believing police officers were hiding inside. He then walked to the other end of the balcony and picked up a riot shield which had been abandoned by the police. Guided by commentary from police officers in overlooking buildings, several officers attempted to intercept Walker but, owing to a miscommunication, the officers were unaware of their position relative to Walker and found they were at the opposite end of the balcony. Three officers ran towards Walker who, on seeing them, picked up the shield and began running back to the flat. He reached the front door just before the officers and threw the shield at them, allowing him to escape into the flat. As other officers arrived, they attempted to break the door down, to no avail. They were ordered to withdraw but Walker was screaming "she dies! She dies!", referring to the child.

Two armed officers threw stun grenades through the windows of the flat, knocking out the lights and leaving debris strewn across the floor. They then climbed through the kitchen window. In the darkness, they were able to identify Walker lying on a sofa in the living room, holding the child across his chest and holding the knife to her. As the officers entered the room, they challenged Walker, who stabbed the girl in the neck. Only a small part of Walker's body was visible under the girl. One officer, PC Tony Long, fired two shots at what he believed was Walker's shoulder; when this appeared to have no effect, he fired again at Walker's temple, knocking him unconscious. It later emerged that, of the first two shots, one had missed and one entered Walker's armpit; the third impacted his shoulder and ricocheted into the side of his head.

== Aftermath ==
The incident lasted 29 hours. Its conclusion took place in front of a crowd and was captured by television cameras as the incident commander had been giving a press conference at the moment Walker appeared on the balcony. The officer who shot Walker grabbed the girl and took her out of the flat and to a waiting ambulance. Walker was presumed to be dead but regained consciousness a few minutes later, at which point he was arrested. He begged the armed officers still in the room to kill him. He was taken to hospital, where both he and the girl recovered from their injuries. Walker stood trial at the Old Bailey in December 1986 for the murder of Jacqueline and multiple other charges including wounding with intent and attempted murder. His plea of diminished responsibility was not accepted and he was sentenced to life imprisonment.

The incident demonstrated D11's capabilities. Although D11 had existed since 1966, the Northolt siege was the first incident in which an officer from the unit shot a suspect. It was also the first use of stun grenades by police in Britain. According to Stephen Smith, a former member of the unit and author of two books on its history, the incident proved that "the unit had matured and was capable of doing what was necessary to protect the public". Smith also felt that it demonstrated that not all incidents could be resolved by negotiation, and that D11 presented a "viable alternative" in such situations.

== See also ==
- Hackney siege, a similar hostage situation in East London in 2002–2003
