= Killing of Anthony Grainger =

2012 police shooting in Cheshire, England

Anthony Grainger was shot and killed by an armed Greater Manchester Police officer in Culcheth, Cheshire, England, on 3 March 2012. At the time, Grainger was unarmed. In January 2014, the Crown Prosecution Service announced that they would be prosecuting Chief Constable Peter Fahy under health and safety legislation over the shooting, and a full public inquiry into Grainger's death was concluded in July 2019, blaming the police. The inquiry report also found that Grainger was a career criminal who posed a potential threat to the police.

== Background ==
In September 2011, Grainger had been arrested and questioned regarding the suspected theft from a police officer of a memory stick containing unencrypted details of 1,075 police informants. Grainger was formally cleared in early January 2012 after police found no evidence connecting him to the memory stick. Despite this, several days after officially clearing him of suspicion, Greater Manchester Police launched Operation Shire, a covert surveillance operation monitoring Grainger and two associates.

== Death ==
Grainger was shot in the chest whilst sitting in a stolen Audi with two other occupants. An armed policeman fired a single shot from a semi-automatic only Heckler & Koch MP5. The bullet went through the windscreen, and entered Grainger's heart and both his lungs. The other two occupants of the car, along with a third person, were tried and cleared of plotting a robbery.

== Investigation ==
An inquest into the death was opened by Nicholas Rheinberg at Warrington Coroner's Court on 5 March 2012. The inquest was adjourned until an IPCC investigation was completed. The IPCC concluded its investigation in July 2013, finding that the intelligence gathering under Operation Shire had been 'flawed', criticising the management of the armed police team sent in to apprehend Grainger, and concluding that the officer responsible for shooting Grainger 'may have a case to answer for regarding possible manslaughter'.

These results were forwarded to the Crown Prosecution Service, who have the authority to decide whether or not to pursue a case, and the coroner. Jonathan Bridge, solicitor for Grainger's family, complained that the investigation had been leaked, without being shown to the family. The CPS decided that the armed policeman who fired the shot would not be prosecuted. They decided that it would be unlikely a jury would find him guilty due to perceived threat.

A CPS spokesman alleged that Greater Manchester Police failed to prepare properly for the operation, which left people at risk. Chief Constable Peter Fahy was charged under Health and Safety at Work Act as he was the corporation sole for Greater Manchester Police. The police force faced an unlimited fine if found guilty. However, in January 2015, William Boyce QC, at Liverpool Crown Court accepted an 'abuse of process' argument from the defence, who had argued that the disclosure of evidence which needed to be disclosed in open court in order for the defendant (Fahy) to have a fair trial would not be in the public interest and would prejudice future Greater Manchester Police operations. The CPS had no choice but to accept the judge's decision and drop the case against the Greater Manchester Police.

== Public inquiry ==
In March 2016, then-Home Secretary Theresa May announced that the inquest into Grainger's death would be converted into a statutory public inquiry with greater investigative and legal powers. The public inquiry, officially opening in January 2017 with a preliminary hearing in November 2016, was led by Judge Teague, who was appointed coroner of the original inquest. The conversion from inquest to inquiry enables all relevant evidence, including confidential police documents previously deemed too sensitive, to be considered. The public inquiry issued a report in July 2019, which blamed the police for the shooting and criticised the Greater Manchester force for serious deficiencies in its firearms unit.

== Aftermath ==
The shooting was the subject of a BBC Radio 4 documentary, One Night in March, in May 2021.

== See also ==
- List of people killed by law enforcement officers in the United Kingdom
- Police use of firearms in the United Kingdom
- Death of Jean Charles de Menezes
- Death of Mark Duggan
- Death of Azelle Rodney
- Deaths after contact with the police
