= Hackney siege =

2002–2003 siege in London, England

Coordinates: 51.5465°N 0.0566°W

The Hackney siege was a criminal event that took place in Hackney, in East London, England, for 15 days from 26 December 2002 to 9 January 2003. It ended with the death of the gunman, Eli Hall.

== Background ==
Eli Hall, born in Jamaica and raised from childhood in the UK, was a 32-year-old former nightclub doorman. In the 1990s, he served a series of prison sentences for violence, possession of controlled drugs, and possession of firearms and other weapons. In 2002, Hall was wanted by police in connection with two incidents in which he was believed to have fired on police officers. In the first, in August 2002, Hall was stopped by officers on foot patrol who believed he was acting suspiciously. The encounter turned violent and an officer used his incapacitant spray on Hall, who produced a handgun. Hall fired at the officers, who took cover, and escaped in the commotion. In the second, in December 2002, local officers approached a car where they suspected drugs were being sold, on an estate in Hackney. On seeing the officers, the driver fired one shot from a handgun then sped off. Hall was identified as the perpetrator after both incidents but the police did not have a record of his address.

Hall's father and older brother were both serving lengthy prison sentences for drugs-related offences at the time of the incident. Hall's younger brother had recently been murdered, for which a man was awaiting trial.

== Siege ==
On Boxing Day, 26 December 2002, police officers located Hall's car, a Toyota Celica, parked on Marvin Street, Hackney, near the junction with Graham Road in the East End of London. Officers in armed response vehicles were sent to covertly monitor the vehicle in the hope that Hall would return to it. After several hours with no sign of Hall, the police sent a civilian contractor to remove the vehicle for forensic examination. Unknown to the police, Hall was living in a flat in a large converted building on the street. Hall spotted the contractor and threatened them from a window, brandishing a firearm, before firing at the police officers who confronted him. Once reinforcements arrived, armed officers attempted to enter the building to determine its layout and Hall's location within it, but Hall heard them forcing a door and opened fire from his window. The officers retreated, several of them returning fire at Hall. The police evacuated the other residents of Hall's building and surrounding buildings and brought in specialist officers, including snipers and trained negotiators, beginning the siege.

The police made contact with Hall at first through a megaphone and then through mobile phones. Early on in the siege, police officers reported a smell of petrol coming from the building. On the third day of the incident, the police discovered that a second man was in the building after he phoned 999, claiming that Hall was holding him hostage. Hall made no demands in relation to the man, who escaped 11 days into the siege. From the outset, Hall refused to cooperate with the police and insisted that he had no intention of going back to prison. At one point, he told the police negotiator that he had a "bathtub full of ammunition" and access to multiple firearms, and that he would not be taken alive. In an attempt to break the deadlock, the police contacted Hall's father in prison and arranged for the two men to speak on the telephone; the police were pleased with the direction of the call at first but it soon deteriorated and ended with the father shouting "don't do what they say; don't let them take you alive".

The siege concluded on 9 January 2003. Hall appeared at the window at around 09:15 and opened fire at the police, narrowly missing a group of officers. A police sniper returned fire with a single shot, hitting Hall in the face and causing him to fall back, away from the window. Shortly afterwards, smoke could be seen coming from the building. A fire rapidly took hold, and several bangs were heard from inside the building. The police addressed Hall through a megaphone in an effort to persuade him to surrender. The London Fire Brigade attempted to tackle the blaze and armed police officers used baton rounds to break the windows and allow fire hoses to reach the seat of the fire, while also firing CS gas into the building, hoping to force Hall out.

Throughout the incident, residents in the affected street and immediately surrounding roads were confined to their homes for their own safety, except some vulnerable people who were evacuated. Some residents criticised the police's cautious approach, believing that the police should have taken direct action at an earlier stage to force a resolution. Commander Bob Quick defended the approach, pointing out that the hostage was released unharmed and that the only casualty was Hall, who killed himself. Quick was supported by several academics and the local MP, Diane Abbott.

Hall was last seen at 10:50. After dark, armed police officers climbed through a window and discovered Hall's burnt body in a hallway outside his flat, still clutching his handgun. Police also found several other handguns and a large quantity of ammunition. An autopsy revealed that the police bullet had entered Hall's cheek and lodged in his neck but was not fatal. The cause of death was determined to be a self-inflicted gunshot to the temple.

The incident is believed to be Britain's longest police siege. The cost of the police operation was estimated at £1 million.

An inquest was held into Hall's death in January 2005. Among the witnesses were the chief police negotiator on the scene and the officer who shot Hall at the conclusion of the siege. The coroner ruled the death a suicide.

== Impact ==
The siege was the longest police operation of its kind in London for over twenty years following the 1980 Iranian Embassy siege, and has been compared to two other major sieges in London, the Spaghetti House siege and the Balcombe Street siege, both in 1975.

In April and May 2003, the Tristan Bates Theatre in the West End hosted Come Out Eli, a play based on the events of the siege and local residents' experiences.

== See also ==
- Northolt siege, a similar incident in North London in 1985
