= Killing of Azelle Rodney =

2005 death of a London man by a Metropolitan Police officer

Death of Azelle Rodney
- Date: 30 April 2005
- Location: Edgware, London, England
- Participants: Azelle Rodney, Metropolitan Police Service, Wesley Lovell, Frank Graham
- Outcome: IPCC: insufficient evidence to prosecute / independent public inquiry: unlawful killing
- Inquiries: IPCC, independent public inquiry (Chair: retired High Court judge, Sir Christopher Holland)
- Inquest: 2 August 2007
- Coroner: Andrew Walker
- Charges: 1 former police officer charged with murder
- Verdict: Inquest not possible due to redacted information by IPCC / Murder trial verdict: Not guilty

Azelle Rodney was a London man who was fatally injured by an armed officer of the Metropolitan Police on 30 April 2005. In July 2013, a public inquiry found that the Specialist Firearms Officer who fired the fatal shots, Anthony Long, had "no lawful justification" for killing Rodney. The case was referred to the Crown Prosecution Service (CPS) to determine whether a prosecution should be launched.

On 30 July 2014, the CPS announced that they had made the decision to charge the officer with murder. On 3 July 2015, the officer was cleared by a jury.

== Biography and background ==
Azelle Rodney was born on 22 April 1981 and brought up in west London. He had two brothers. Rodney was known for his sporting abilities at school, his football and athletic development came to an end after a hip injury and two subsequent operations when he was 16. He also had an interest in music, and developed this and attended the local gymnasium.

His mother stated after his death that her son barely knew the two men from whom he had accepted a lift, that he was not a gangster, and that he had only had a minor criminal record. A report compiled for the public inquiry later described Azelle Rodney as a mid-level career criminal at the time of the shooting and he was wanted by police in connection with two stabbings.

His girlfriend gave birth to their daughter after his death.

== Death ==
On the night of 30 April 2005, Rodney was driven by associates Wesley Lovell and Frank Graham in a hired silver Volkswagen Golf. The three drove across north London after they were observed by police to pick up three weapons, believed to be MAC-10 sub-machine guns. They were seemingly unaware that their car had been under surveillance for some time and that it was being followed by armed police in unmarked vehicles. It was later revealed at the trial of Lovell and Graham for drugs and firearms offences that they had been under police surveillance for two days and that the car had been tailed for several hours on 30 April.

According to information later released to Rodney's family by the Independent Police Complaints Commission, the armed police following the VW Golf moved at some point to "State Red", meaning that the car was to be intercepted as soon as possible. This occurred as the car was passing the Railway Tavern on Hale Lane in the London Borough of Barnet at 7:43 pm, the police using a manoeuvre known as a "hard stop". An unmarked police Audi swerved in front of the VW Golf, a Vauxhall Omega halted alongside, and a third vehicle impacted the rear of the VW.

Fourteen members of the Metropolitan Police's Specialist Firearms Command (CO19) emerged from the cars. Hatton rounds – a form of shotgun breaching round – were fired to puncture the VW Golf's tyres. During this, a CO19 officer later referred to by his call sign of E7, who had twenty years of firearms experience, leant across from the front passenger seat of the Vauxhall Omega and fired eight 5.56mm rounds from his Heckler & Koch G36 Compact semi-automatic carbine through the passenger window of the VW Golf at Rodney, six of which hit him in the face, head, neck and chest.

An immediate police search of car found ammunition and three guns: a M1911 0.45 inch ACP Calibre self‐loading pistol; a Baikal pistol; and a smaller gun described as looking like a key fob. A later search of Lovell's flat revealed that it had been used to produce a "significant quantity" of crack cocaine.

Before family liaison officers called on his family, Metropolitan Police officers had called at a neighbour's house to confirm Rodney's identity. That evening various news agencies reported that Rodney had been holding a gun when he was shot, and later described him as a "drugs baron" and a crack dealer. The Times mentioned after Lovell and Graham's trial that he had been "visiting a drug factory that he ran". Police called at his mother's house to inform her of his death on the afternoon of 1 May 2005, almost 24 hours later.

== Investigations and adjourned inquest ==
=== IPCC ===
The shooting was first investigated by the Independent Police Complaints Commission which passed its findings to the Crown Prosecution Service (CPS) for consideration. The CPS concluded in July 2006 that there was insufficient evidence to convict any individual involved for Rodney's death. John Yates, the Metropolitan Police's Deputy Assistant Commissioner at the time, said that "The situation facing our officer that evening clearly left him with no option than to take the course of action he did."

The officer responsible said: "Everything about his actions led me to believe that he was fully ready to fire with a fully automatic weapon." However, the Independent Police Complaints Commission confirmed that Rodney was not seen holding a gun when he was shot dead.

=== Inquest (adjourned) ===
On 2 August 2007, deputy coroner Andrew Walker, sitting at Hornsey North London, ruled that a full inquest into Rodney's death could not be held because of the large number of redactions in police officers' evidence statements. The redactions were made under the Regulation of Investigatory Powers Act 2000 which covers information obtained from covert surveillance including telephone taps and bugs. The Rodney family's solicitor, Daniel Machover, said that he had written to the Home Office and the Ministry of Justice asking that the law be changed to allow the coroner to proceed with the inquest.

In May 2009 four years after his death, Rodney's mother, Susan Alexander, filed a case against the British government in the European Court of Human Rights, claiming that her human rights were breached by the failure to hold a "reasonably prompt" and public investigation into her son's death. The British government apologised to the European Court for the delay in holding a full investigation.

=== Independent public inquiry ===
Logo of the inquiry

On 30 March 2010, Justice Minister, Lord Bach announced in the UK House of Lords a public inquiry into Rodney's death. It was the first time in England that an inquiry under the Inquiries Act 2005 replaced the role of an inquest jury to investigate a death regarding state deprivation of life and use of force as defined by Article 2 of the European Convention on Human Rights. The inquiry began on 6 October 2010 chaired by a former high court judge, Sir Christopher Holland. The chair ruled that evidence previously kept secret could in fact be made public. The Chair sought assurance, which was given in writing, from the Attorney General that evidence provided by witnesses to the Inquiry would not be used in any criminal proceedings.

On 3 September 2012, seven years after Azelle Rodney was killed, the inquiry into his death began hearing oral evidence. The identity of the officer who killed Rodney was protected and the officer was labelled, 'E7'. The inquiry heard that Rodney had been shot at eight times (six shots hit him) by 'E7' from an unmarked police car used, along with other unmarked police vehicles, to stop the car that Rodney was seated in the back of. 'E7' told the inquiry that he shot Rodney because Rodney's movements led him to believe Rodney had picked up a gun, possibly a machine gun, and he believed Azelle Rodney was about to open fire. He stated that at no point had he ever stated that he had seen a gun in Rodney's hands which had been obscured by the car door . The earlier IPCC inquiry established that Rodney was unarmed when he was shot and killed by 'E7'.

In July 2013 the public inquiry concluded that the armed police officer who fired the fatal shots had "no lawful justification" for killing Rodney. The report of the inquiry noted that eight shots were fired from close range in 2.1 seconds, six of which hit Rodney. The first two shots that hit him had neutralised any threat from Rodney. Subsequent shots were unlawful, either causing death or being fired at "a dead or dying man". The inquiry found that 'E7', the officer who killed Rodney, "could not rationally be believed" and rejected his version of events which were contradicted by forensic evidence. The inquiry did not find that 'E7' was deliberately lying. The inquiry concluded that firing at Rodney to kill him "was disproportionate and therefore unreasonable and unlawful".

Susan Alexander, Rodney's mother, said he should not have been, "summarily killed". "The police owe me an apology for the unlawful killing of my son", she said.

'E7', supported by the Metropolitan Police Commissioner, applied to the High Court for a judicial review of the public inquiry, claiming the Chair's conclusions were "irrational". In refusing the application Mr Justice Williams said he had "no doubt" there was "ample evidence to justify the finding" that 'E7' did not have an honest belief that Mr Rodney had picked up a gun.

The case was referred to the Crown Prosecution Service (CPS) to determine whether a prosecution should be launched.

== Criminal proceedings ==
=== Murder trial ===
In July 2014, based on new evidence from the public inquiry and its conclusion of unlawful killing, the Crown Prosecution Service charged the former police officer, who had by now left the Metropolitan Police Service, with Azelle Rodney's murder saying, "there is a realistic prospect of conviction and that a prosecution is in the public interest". Reporting restrictions were lifted allowing the charged officer formerly identified only as 'E7' to be properly named as PC Anthony Long. The conclusion of the public inquiry that Rodney's killing was unlawful was withheld from the jury at the murder trial. The trial started at the Old Bailey, the English Central Criminal Court, on 8 June 2015, some ten years after Rodney's death.

On 3 July 2015 Anthony Long was found not guilty of murder by a majority verdict. After the trial Long said, "Police firearms officers do not go out intending to shoot people and, like me in this case, have to make split-second life or death decisions based on the information available to them at the time".

=== Lovell and Graham trial ===
Wesley Lovell and Frank Graham, who had been in the car with Rodney, were later sentenced to seven years and six years imprisonment respectively at Middlesex Guildhall Crown Court on 24 January 2006 for drugs and firearms offences. The court was told that three guns were found in the car and that Lovell's flat had been used to produce crack cocaine.

The trial also revealed that there was some dispute regarding the guns present in the VW Golf at the time of Rodney's death. In a statement, Scotland Yard said that the guns were "loaded and fully operational", however evidence given by the prosecution differed; it was stated that a Colt .45 pistol which Graham admitted to owning was on the back seat but had been deactivated and could not fire, while Lovell's pistol – which had been converted from a tear gas gun – was found inside a rucksack along with a loaded double-barrelled handgun.

== See also ==
- List of people killed by law enforcement officers in the United Kingdom
- Police use of firearms in the United Kingdom
- Northolt siege, a previous incident (1985) involving the same police officer
- Killing of Mark Duggan
- Killing of Anthony Grainger
- Deaths after contact with the police
