= Law enforcement in the United Kingdom =

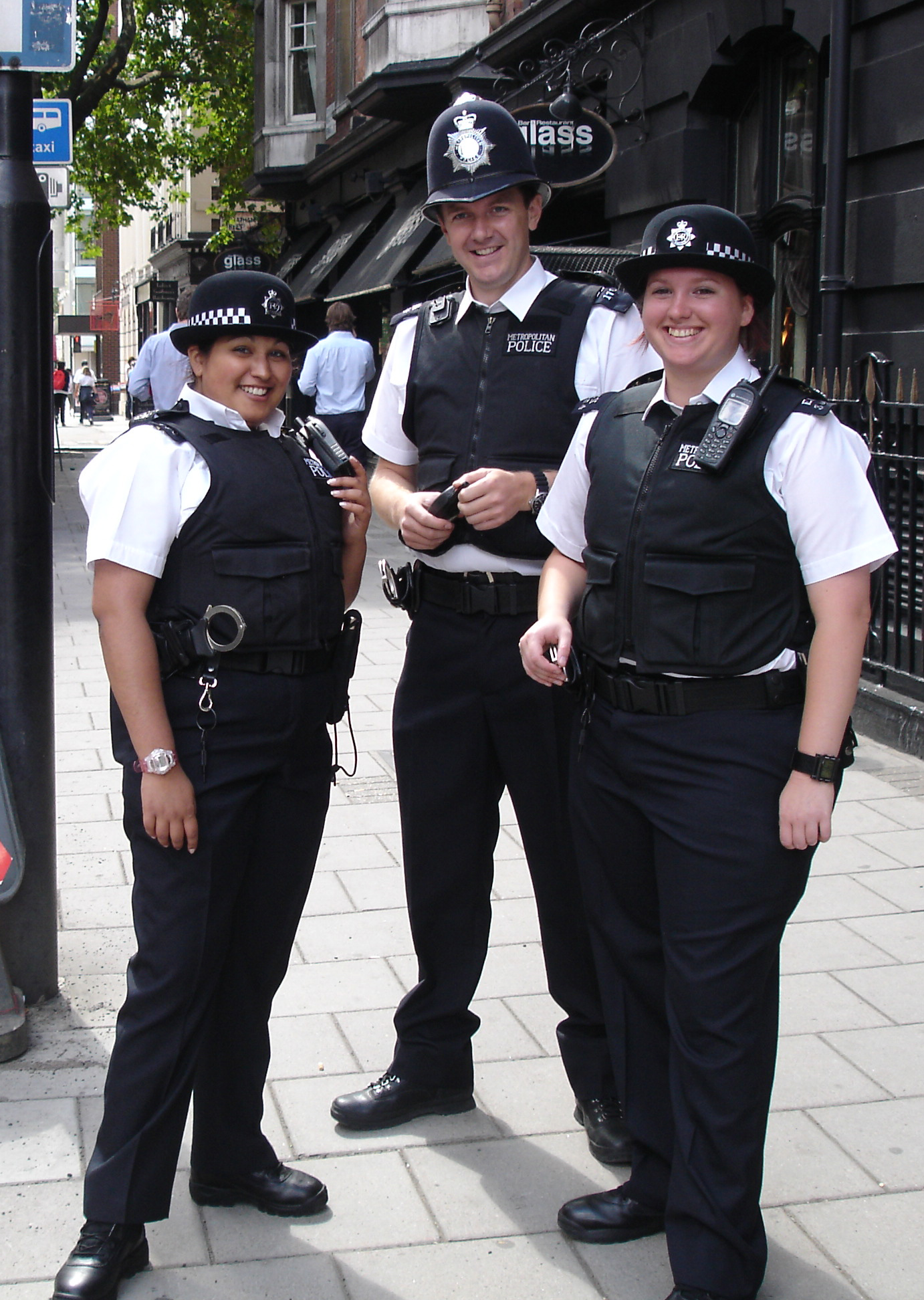
Metropolitan Police officers.

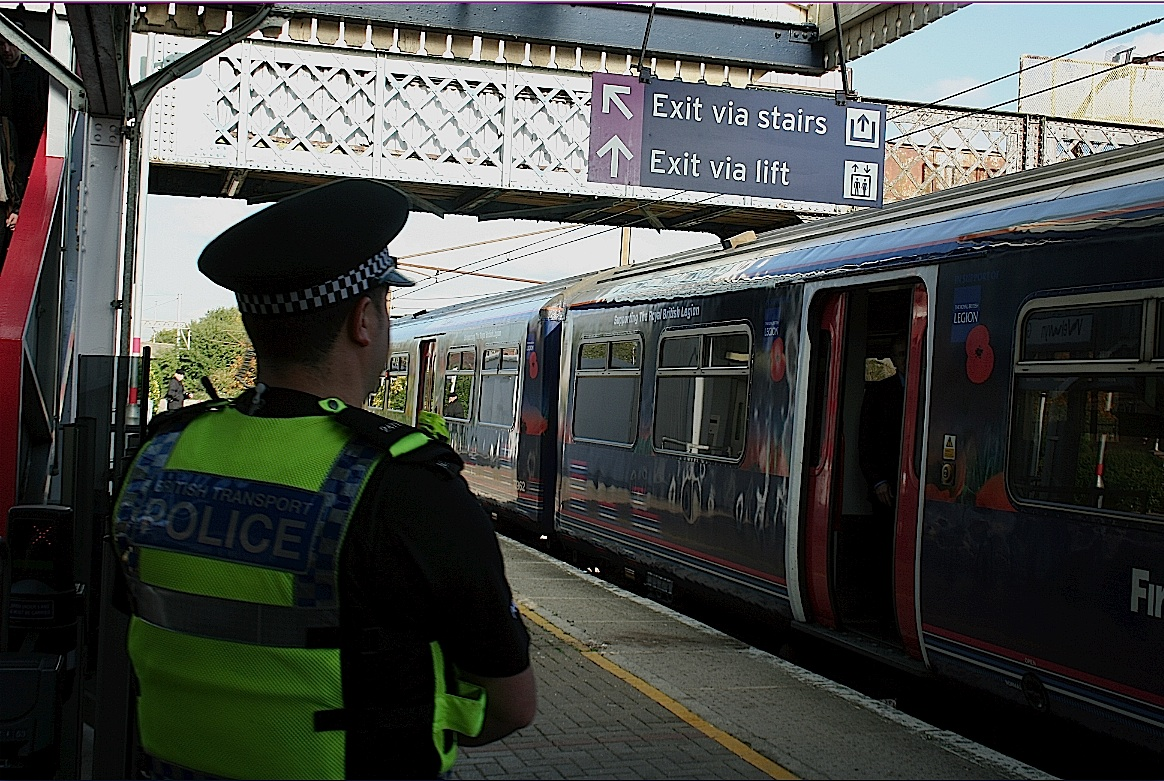
The British Transport Police are responsible for policing the railway network of Great Britain, as well as certain rapid transit and tram systems.

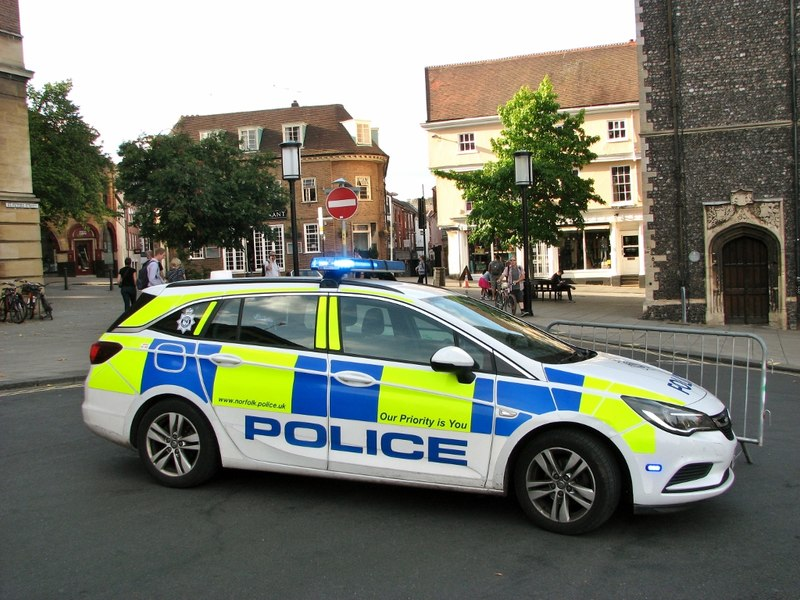
An example of a UK police vehicle, this one a Norfolk Constabulary Vauxhall Astra, featuring standardised blue and yellow Battenburg markings used by all UK police forces

Law enforcement in the United Kingdom is organised separately in each of the legal systems of the United Kingdom: England and Wales, Scotland, and Northern Ireland. Most law enforcement duties are carried out by police constables of a territorial police force.

There are 48 police forces in the UK. These consist of 39 territorial police forces in England, four in Wales, one in Scotland, and one in Northern Ireland. Each is responsible for most law enforcement and crime reduction in its police area. The territorial police forces of England and Wales are overseen by the Home Office and by a police and crime commissioner or other police authority, although they are operationally independent from government. The other three police forces are the British Transport Police (BTP), the Civil Nuclear Constabulary (CNC), and the Ministry of Defence Police (MDP), which provide specialist policing services.

In addition, the National Crime Agency (NCA) is primarily tasked with tackling organised crime and has been compared to the Federal Bureau of Investigation (FBI) in the United States.

The British model of policing is based on three interrelated concepts: the Office of Constable, operational independence, and policing by consent. Police constables have certain powers that enable them to execute their duties. Their primary duties are to protect the public by detecting and preventing crime. Police officers exercise their police powers independently of government and with the implicit consent of the public. "Policing by consent" is the phrase used to describe this. It expresses that the legitimacy of policing in the eyes of the public is based upon a consensus of support that follows from transparency about their powers, their integrity in exercising those powers and their accountability for doing so.

Most police constables in England, Scotland, and Wales do not carry firearms. As of 2022, there were 142,526 police officers in England and Wales, 6,192 of whom are Authorised Firearms Officers (roughly one in 25).

== History ==
In the 18th century, law enforcement and policing were organised by local communities based on watchmen and constables; the government was not directly involved in policing. The City of Glasgow Police, the first professional police, was established following an Act of Parliament in 1800. The first centrally organised police force in the world was created in Ireland, then a part of the United Kingdom, following the Peace Preservation Act in 1814 for which Sir Robert Peel was largely responsible.

London had a population of nearly one and a half million people in the early 19th century, but was policed by only 450 constables and 4,500 night watchmen. The concept of professional policing was taken up by Sir Robert Peel when he became Home Secretary in 1822. Peel's Metropolitan Police Act 1829 established a full-time, professional and centrally-organised police force for the greater London area known as the Metropolitan Police. In March 1839, Sir Edwin Chadwick presented The Royal Commission on Constabulary Forces to Parliament. This report was to evaluate how the burgeoning police force would work with "poor law" as well as to make the case to establish a national force based on the Metropolitan Police. Much of his argument was based on the necessity for the protection of the developing capitalism that was growing in England at the time. Chadwick also addressed the concern that building out a powerful police state could lead to a reduction in civil and personal liberties, but argued that the fear of crime made English citizens slaves, and so they were less free without aggressive policing. Legislation in the 1830s introduced policing in boroughs and many counties, and, in the 1850s, policing was established nationally.

The so-called "Peelian principles" describe the philosophy that Sir Robert Peel is supposed to have used to define an ethical police force. The principles traditionally – but incorrectly – ascribed to Peel, state that:

- Whether the police are effective is not measured by the number of arrests, but by the lack of crime.
- Above all else, an effective authority figure knows trust and accountability are paramount. Hence, Peel's most often quoted principle is that "The police are the public and the public are the police."

Some of these can be found in the "General Instructions" issued to every new police officer in the Metropolitan Police from 1829, such as policing existing to prevent crime, and to minimise the use of force. The Home Office has suggested the list was more likely to have been authored by Charles Rowan and Richard Mayne, the first and joint Commissioners of the Metropolitan Police. None of these are correct, however, and were likely codified by Charles Reith, some from ideas that existed since the eighteenth century.

The police historian Charles Reith explained in his New Study of Police History (1956) that these principles constituted a philosophy of policing "unique in history and throughout the world because it derived not from fear but almost exclusively from public co-operation with the police, induced by them designedly by behaviour which secures and maintains for them the approval, respect and affection of the public". This approach to policing became known as "policing by consent".

Other historians, such as Robert Storch, David Philips and Roger Swift, argue that Peel's Metropolitan Police were built on his experience of the Royal Irish Constabulary. Storch's view is that the English police force is not different from those of other nations and, in fact, follows a rather typical development as a colonial peacekeeping force. There is extensive documentation of police brutality in the 19th century, including excessive force, racial profiling, and several charges of murder. The controversies that plagued the early years of the police force were much the same as the current complaints against modern policing.

The first women police officers were employed during the First World War. Hull and Southampton were two of the first towns to employ women police, although Grantham was the first to have a warranted policewoman.

Since the 1940s, police forces in the United Kingdom have been merged and modernised. Corruption at the Metropolitan Police's Flying Squad led to a conviction and resignations in 1977 after the Operation Countryman investigations. A Police Complaints Board was set up to handle allegations of malpractice in response.

Changes took place to tighten police procedures in the 1980s, in response to the Scarman Report, to ensure that evidence and interviews were robust, in the introduction of the Police and Criminal Evidence Act 1984. In 1989, the West Midlands Serious Crime Squad was disbanded as a series of around 100 criminal cases failed or were subsequently overturned in the West Midlands, after new forensic techniques showed police officers had been tampering with statement evidence to secure convictions, including those of the Birmingham Six. The Police Complaints Board was replaced by the Police Complaints Authority in 1985, which itself was superseded by the Independent Police Complaints Commission (IPCC) in 2004. On 8 January 2018, the IPCC was replaced by the Independent Office for Police Conduct (IOPC).

== National Crime Agency ==
The National Crime Agency (NCA) is the UK's lead agency against organised crime, human and drug trafficking, weapons and cybercrime, including economic crime that goes across regional and international borders, but it can be tasked to investigate any crime.

The NCA has a strategic role as part of which it looks at serious crime in aggregate across the UK, especially analysing how organised criminals are operating and how they can be disrupted. To do this, it works closely with regional organised crime units (ROCUs), local police forces, and other government departments and agencies. It is not a police force as such, but many of its employees do have the power of a constable.

It is the UK's point of contact for foreign agencies such as Interpol, Europol and other international law enforcement agencies. On a day-to-day basis, the NCA assists police forces and other law enforcement agencies (and vice versa) under voluntary assistance arrangements. In extremis, the NCA director general has the power to direct a chief officer of a police force to give directed assistance with NCA tasks where necessary (but only with consent of the relevant Secretary of State). The NCA itself can also be directed by the Secretary of State to give directed assistance to a police force or other law enforcement agency.

It was established in 2013 as a non-ministerial government department, replacing the Serious Organised Crime Agency and absorbed the previously separate Child Exploitation and Online Protection Centre (CEOP) as one of its commands. It also assumed a number of responsibilities from other law enforcement agencies.

The NCA has also assumed a range of functions from the National Policing Improvement Agency, which has been scrapped as part of the government's changes to policing. These include a specialist database relating to injuries and unusual weapons, expert research on potential serial killers, and the National Missing Persons Bureau. The agencies going into the NCA had a combined budget of £812 million (equivalent to £1.1 billion or US$1.41 billion in 2024) yet the new agency only had £464 million in its first year—a decrease of 43%. Some of the responsibilities of the former UK Border Agency (now Immigration Enforcement and Border Force) relating to border policing also became part of the NCA. Like its predecessor SOCA, the NCA has been dubbed the "British FBI" by the media.

The director general is Graeme Biggar.

== Powers of officers ==
=== Territorial police constables ===
Most police officers are members of territorial police forces. A person must make a declaration before taking up office as a constable and having any powers; although this is sometimes still known as the police oath, and the process sometimes referred to as "swearing in", it now takes the form of an "attestation" (in England and Wales and Northern Ireland) or a "declaration" (in Scotland). Their primary duties are the protection of life and property, preservation of the peace, and prevention and detection of criminal offences. The process is carried out in the presence of a magistrate, and is usually followed by the issue of a warrant card. This grants the officer all the powers and privileges, duties, and responsibilities of a constable in one of the three distinct legal systems – England and Wales, Scotland, or Northern Ireland, and the territorial waters of that country. The limited circumstances where their powers extend across the border are described in the section above.

Police powers can be grouped into three categories:

- Powers to investigate crime. This includes a range of powers to collect evidence needed to identify suspects and support their fair and effective trial.
- Powers to prevent crime. This includes a range of powers to maintain public order, prevent anti-social behaviour, and manage known offenders/ suspects.
- Powers to "dispose" of criminal cases. These powers allow police officers to dispose of criminal cases outside of court or charge suspects so they can be prosecuted.

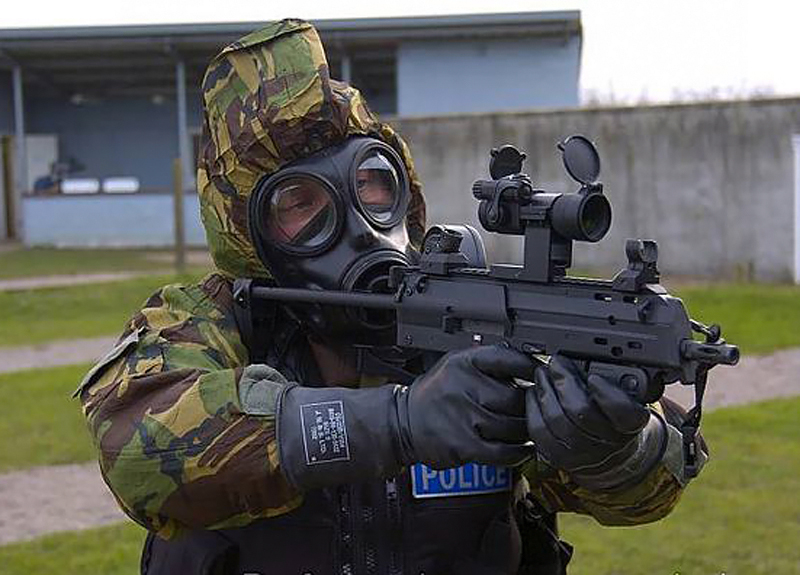
Ministry of Defence Police (MDP) officer wearing chemical protective equipment and armed with a HK7 personal defence weapon taking part in training

=== Other constables ===
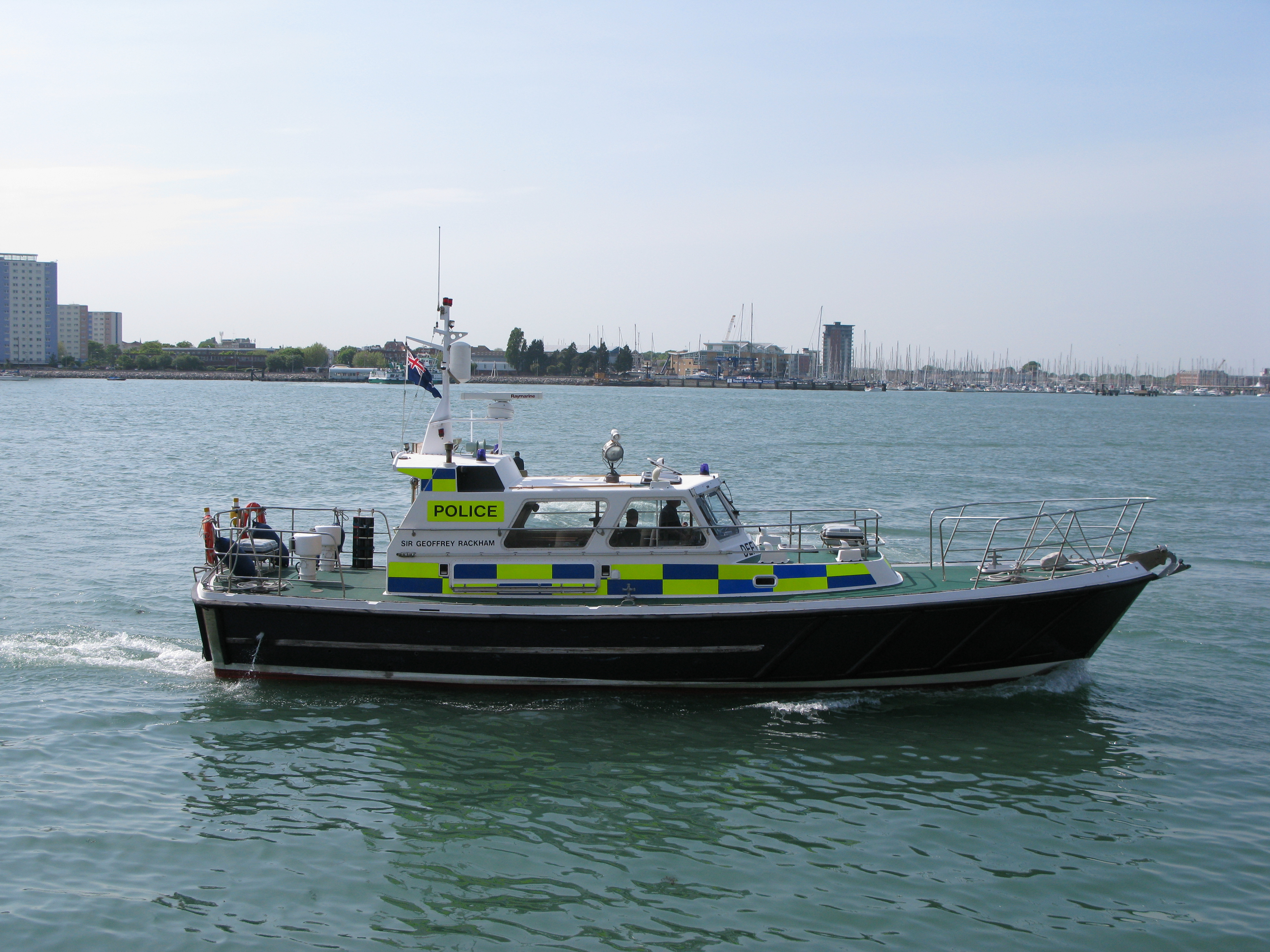
Ministry of Defence Police (MDP) boat in Portsmouth Harbour

Many constables are not members of territorial police forces. The most notable are members of the three forces referred to as special police forces: the British Transport Police, Ministry of Defence Police, and Civil Nuclear Constabulary. Such officers have the "powers and privileges of a constable" in matters relating to their work. BTP and MDP officers have additional jurisdiction where requested by a constable of another force, in which case they take on that constable's jurisdiction. Upon request from the chief police officer of a police force, members of one of the above three forces can be given the full powers of constables in the police area of the requesting force. This was used to supplement police numbers in the areas surrounding the 2005 G8 summit at Gleneagles.

Many acts allow companies or councils to employ constables for a specific purpose. There are ten companies whose employees are sworn in as constables under section 79 of the Harbours, Docks, and Piers Clauses Act 1847. As a result, they have the full powers of a constable on land owned by the harbour, dock, or port and at any place within one mile of any owned land. There are also forces created by specific legislation, such as the Port of Tilbury Police (Port of London Act 1968), Mersey Tunnels Police (County of Merseyside Act 1989), and the Epping Forest Keepers (Epping Forest Act 1878).

==== Parks Constables ====
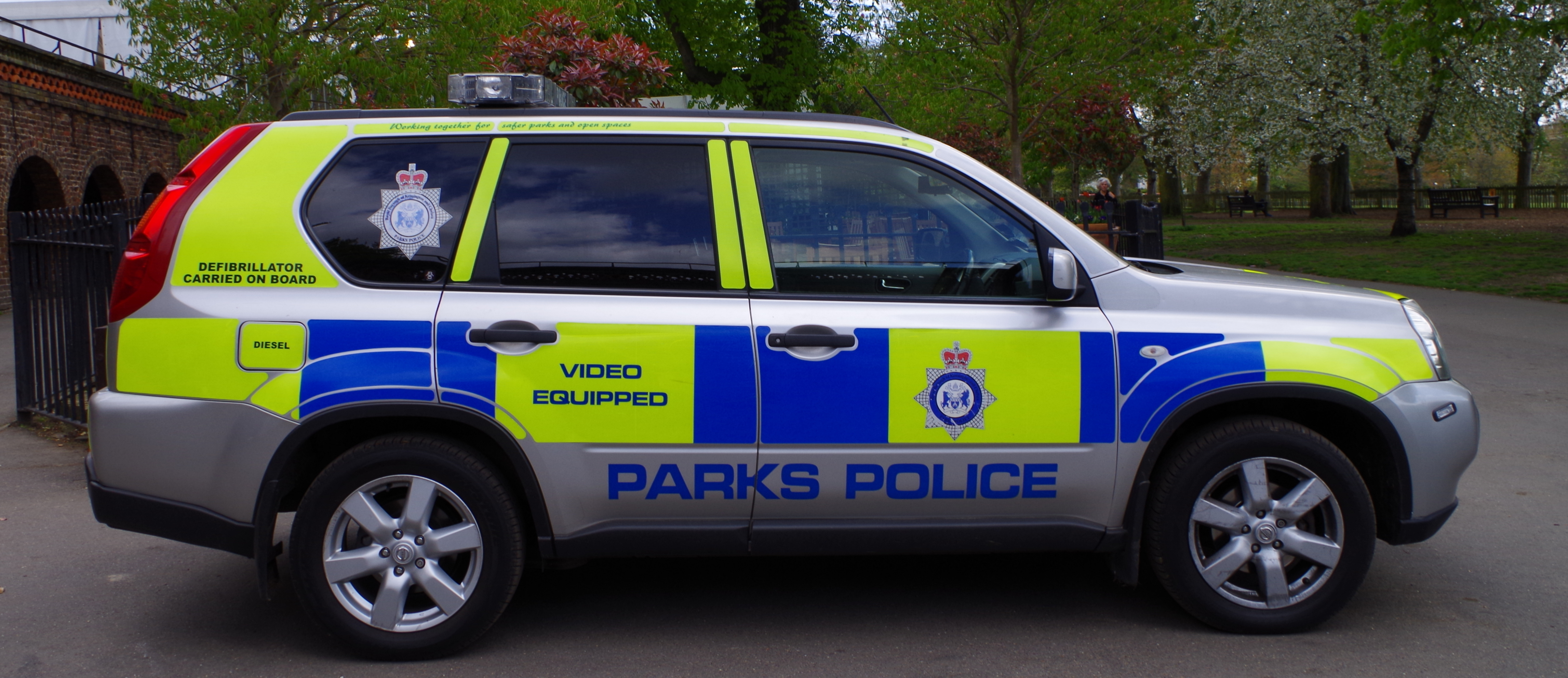
Royal Borough of Kensington and Chelsea Parks Police vehicle

Under Article 18 of the Ministry of Housing and Local Government Provisional Order Confirmation (Greater London Parks and Open Spaces) Act 1967, London Borough Councils are allowed to swear in council officers as constables for "securing the observance of the provisions of all enactments relating to open spaces under their control or management and of bye-laws and regulations made thereunder". Local Authority Parks Constables have all the powers of a constable in relation byelaws regulations and all enactments relating to open spaces, Article 19 of the Act was repealed by section 26(1) of the Police and Criminal Evidence Act 1984 (Local Acts) and the power of arrest for Parks Constables is now contained in Section 24 of P.A.C.E 1984, further amendments to Article 19 covering coming to the aid and assistance of such a constable or officer were repealed by SOCPA 2005, as this provision is already covered in P.A.C.E 1984 (Legal Counsel 2007,2012). No enforcement agency with the power of arrest or detention can operate outside of the provisions of P.A.C.E 1984; therefore, all local powers of arrest and detention were brought into line under section 26(1) P.A.C.E 1984.

=== Police staff ===
Police forces employ staff who perform many functions to assist officers and support the smooth running of their police force. They do not hold the office of constable. In England and Wales, the chief police officer of a territorial police force may designate any person who is employed by the police authority maintaining that force, and is under the direction and control of that chief police officer, as one of the following:

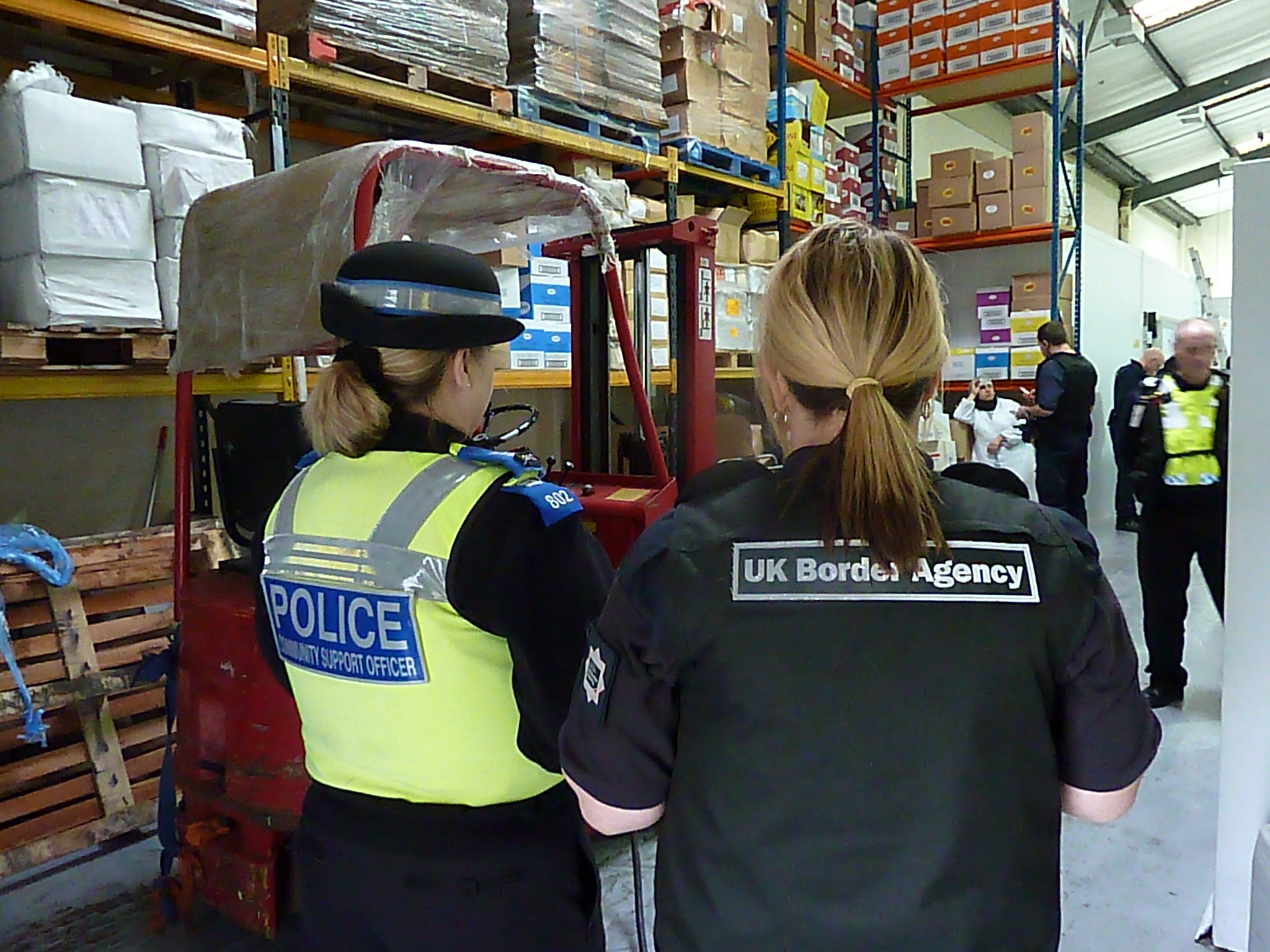
Police Community Support Officer and UK Border Force Agent

- Police community support officer (PCSO)
- Policing support officer.

PCSOs were created by the Police Reform Act 2002, with a range of standard powers, as well as additional powers that can be conferred at the discretion of their chief police officer. Unlike a police constable, a PCSO only has powers when on duty and in uniform, and within the area policed by their respective force.

The policing support officer role was originally as three separate roles in Police Reform Act 2002, each with a specific list of discretionary powers that may be awarded by a chief constable:

- Investigating officer,
- Detention officer, or
- Escort officer.

The Policing and Crime Act 2017 reformed this and streamlined it to the two roles above, and gave full discretionary powers to Chief Constables, such that they may assign any powers, other than powers reserved for constables only, to any police staff or volunteer.

Until 1991, parking enforcement was primarily conducted by police-employed traffic wardens. Since the passage of the Road Traffic Act 1991, decriminalised parking enforcement has enabled local authorities to take on this role, and now very few forces still employ police traffic wardens. These include the Metropolitan Police Service; however, it has combined the role with PCSOs as traffic community support officers.

In Scotland, police custody and security officers have powers similar to those of detention officers and escort officers in England and Wales. Similar powers are available in Northern Ireland.

=== Accredited persons ===
Chief police officers of territorial police forces (and the British Transport Police) can also give limited powers to people not employed by the police authority, under Community Safety Accreditation Schemes. A notable example is officers of the Driver and Vehicle Standards Agency, who have been given powers to stop vehicles. This practice has been criticised by the Police Federation who described it as "half-baked".

=== Members of the armed forces ===
In Northern Ireland only, members of British Armed Forces have powers to stop people or vehicles, arrest and detain people for three hours and enter buildings to keep the peace or search for people who have been kidnapped. Additionally, commissioned officers may close roads. If necessary, they may use force when exercising these powers as long as it is reasonable.

Under the Customs Management Act 1979, members of the armed forces may detain people if they believe they have committed an offence under the Customs & Excise Acts, and may seize goods if they believe they are liable to forfeiture under the same acts.

Service police/military police personnel are not constables under UK law and they do not have any police powers over the general public; however, they have the full range of policing powers that constables possess when dealing with service personnel or civilians subject to service discipline, drawing their powers from the Armed Forces Act 2006. The service police assist territorial police forces in towns in the UK with nearby military barracks, where there are likely to be significant numbers of service personnel off duty. In British Overseas Territories, they are sometimes sworn in as constables to assist and/or act as the police force (e.g. the British Indian Ocean Territory Police which is made up of tri-service police personnel and are known as "Royal Overseas Police Officers") and anywhere that British Forces are stationed or deployed. Generally, when carrying out this assistance, service policemen/women are unarmed, but have a range of PPE, including batons, handcuffs, and stab vests.

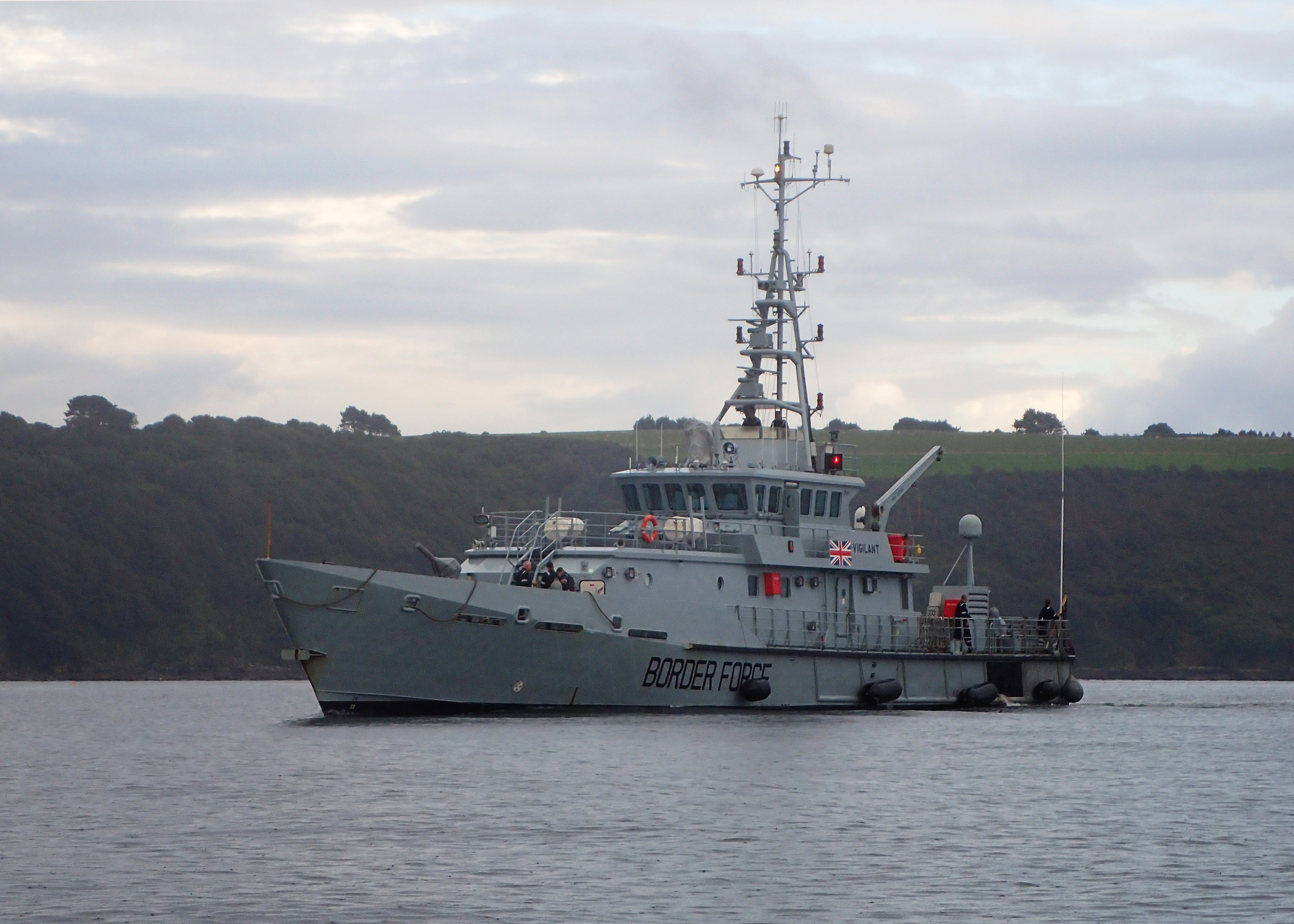
A Border Force cutter, primarily enforcing customs and immigration laws in UK waters

=== Other persons ===
==== Sworn persons ====
- Prison officers of His Majesty's Prison Service, the Scottish Prison Service, and the Northern Ireland Prison Service have the powers, authority, protection, and privileges of a constable when acting as such.
- Employees of the National Crime Agency can be granted the powers of a constable, immigration officer or customs officer.
- Border Force and Immigration Enforcement officers hold powers as immigration officers and/or customs officers, with certain powers of arrest, detention, and search.
- HM Revenue and Customs staff can hold the powers of a customs officer, with widespread powers in relation to customs offences.
- In England and Wales, Environment Agency fisheries enforcement officers have the powers, authority, protection, and privileges of a constable and powers in relation to enforcement of fishing regulations. Scottish water bailiffs have similar powers.
- Court officers, commonly referred to as "bailiffs" — bailiff in Scotland and enforcement agents in England and Wales — can enforce court orders and, in some cases, have powers of arrest.

==== Non-sworn persons ====
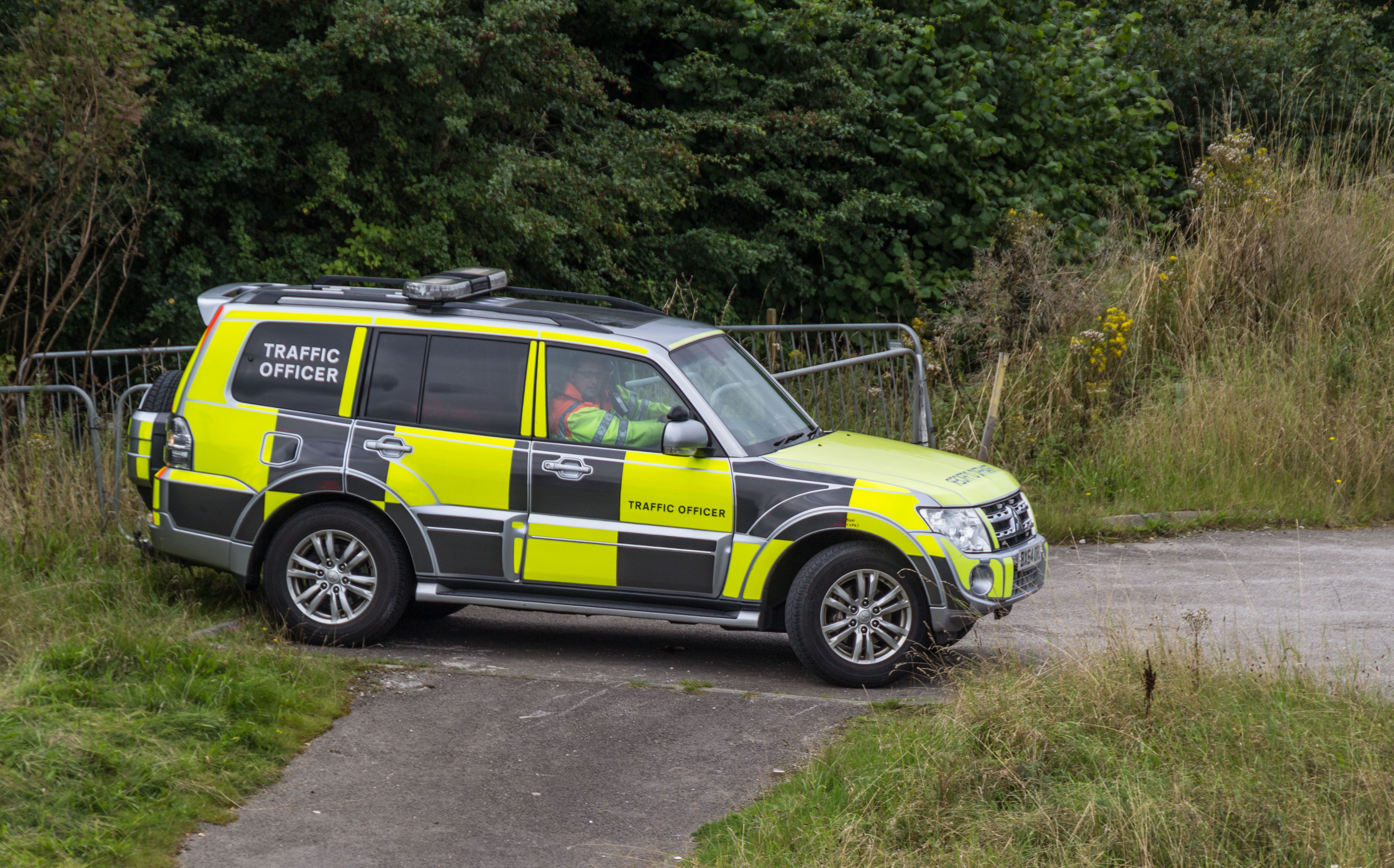
National Highways Traffic Officer vehicle

- In England, Traffic Officers are employed by National Highways to maintain traffic flow on trunk roads. Traffic Officers have powers to direct traffic and place road signs, close lanes of an active motorway, and stop vehicles if they believe them to be unroadworthy for the road and the condition they are driving in.
- Some employees of local authorities have powers of entry relating to inspection of businesses under the Sunday Trading Act 1994 and powers to give Fixed Penalty Notices for offences such as littering, graffiti or one of the wide-ranging offences in the Clean Neighbourhoods and Environment Act 2005. Such powers may be granted under local bylaws or acts of parliament. The Community Safety Accreditation Scheme also led to the proliferation of accredited neighbourhood warden schemes (and supporting enforcement functions) employed by several local authorities (and sometimes social housing providers) across England and Wales, such as Nottingham City Council's Community Protection Officers.
- Natural England and Animal and Plant Health Agency wildlife inspectors have certain powers of entry and inspection to investigate wildlife offences and licences relating to wildlife.
- Inshore Fisheries and Conservation Authority officers have powers to enforce bylaws and parts of the Marine and Coastal Access Act 2009.
- Employees of fire and rescue services have extensive powers in the event of an emergency, and more limited powers in other circumstances, such as fire investigations.
- The Ministry of Defence Guard Service (MGS) is an unarmed, civilian, security force that protects Ministry of Defence (MOD) sites and persons. They provide access control, patrols, and static guarding.
- The Military Provost Guard Service (MPGS) is part of the Adjutant General's Corps Provost Branch of the British Army, responsible for maintaining physical and armed security at British Armed Forces locations throughout Great Britain.
- Regimental police of the British Army (properly called Regimental Provost Staff) are non-commissioned officers (NCOs) of a regiment or corps that are responsible for regimental discipline and service law enforcement. They belong to the regiment or corps, in which they enforce discipline, rather than the Royal Military Police or its equivalent. They are not to be confused with service/military police.
- Civilian Security Officers (CSO) of the Northern Ireland Security Guard Service whilst on duty hold similar powers to those of a Police Constable, as allowed by the Emergency Laws (Miscellaneous Provisions) Act 1947. A CSO has the powers of arrest under the Police and Criminal Evidence (Northern Ireland) Order 1989 (PACE).
- The Military Provost Staff (MPS) is the British Army's prison service and specialists in custody and detention. They operate the Military Corrective Training Centre (MCTC) (Colchester, Essex) and the seven regional service custody facilities around the country.

In the United Kingdom, every person has limited powers of arrest if they see a crime being committed: at common law in Scotland, and in England and Wales if the crime is indictable;– these are called "every person powers", commonly referred to as a citizen's arrest. In England and Wales, the vast majority of attested constables enjoy full powers of arrest and search as granted by the Police and Criminal Evidence Act 1984. For this legislation, constables are defined to mean all police officers, irrespective of rank. Although police officers have wide-ranging powers, they are still subject to the same laws as members of the public (aside from specific exemptions such as the carrying of firearms and certain road traffic legislation). There are additional legal restrictions placed on police officers, such as the prohibitions on industrial action and on taking part in active politics.

== Accountability ==
From 22 November 2012, police authorities outside London were replaced by directly elected Police and Crime Commissioners or Police, Fire and Crime Commissioners. In London, the City of London Police continued to be overseen by City of London Corporation, whilst the Mayor of London has responsibility for the governance of the Metropolitan Police. The mayors of Greater Manchester and West Yorkshire also have responsibility for governance.

In Northern Ireland, the Police Service of Northern Ireland is supervised by the Northern Ireland Policing Board.

In Scotland, Police Scotland is overseen by the Scottish Police Authority.

The British Transport Police and the Civil Nuclear Constabulary had their own police authority established in 2004. These forces operate across the United Kingdom, and their responsibility is to the specific activities they were established to police.

=== His Majesty's Inspectorates of Constabulary ===
The official bodies responsible for the examination and assessment of police forces to ensure their requirements are met as intended are:

- His Majesty's Inspectorate of Constabulary and Fire & Rescue Services (HMICFRS): this organisation is responsible to the Home Office for police forces in England and Wales. It also inspects, by invitation, various UK special police forces and elements of the Service (Military) Police. Since 2004, HMICFRS has also had responsibility for examining HM Revenue and Customs and the Serious Organised Crime Agency. Inspection services have been provided on a non-statutory basis for the Police Service of Northern Ireland. Since July 2017, it has also become responsible for inspecting Fire & Rescue Services in England.
- His Majesty's Inspectorate of Constabulary in Scotland (commonly known as HMICS): this organisation is responsible to the Scottish Government and examines the Police Service of Scotland and the Scottish Police Authority.

As of June 2022, in addition to the London Metropolitan Police, six police forces are in special measures because they are failing. They are the Cleveland, Greater Manchester police, and Gloucestershire police. Staffordshire and Wiltshire forces. London mayor Sadiq Khan said "(...) after 12 years of massive cuts. We've lost 21,000 experienced officers around the country, many of them in London. Because of City Hall funding, we've managed to replace many of them, but clearly, with newer, inexperienced officers."

== Operations ==
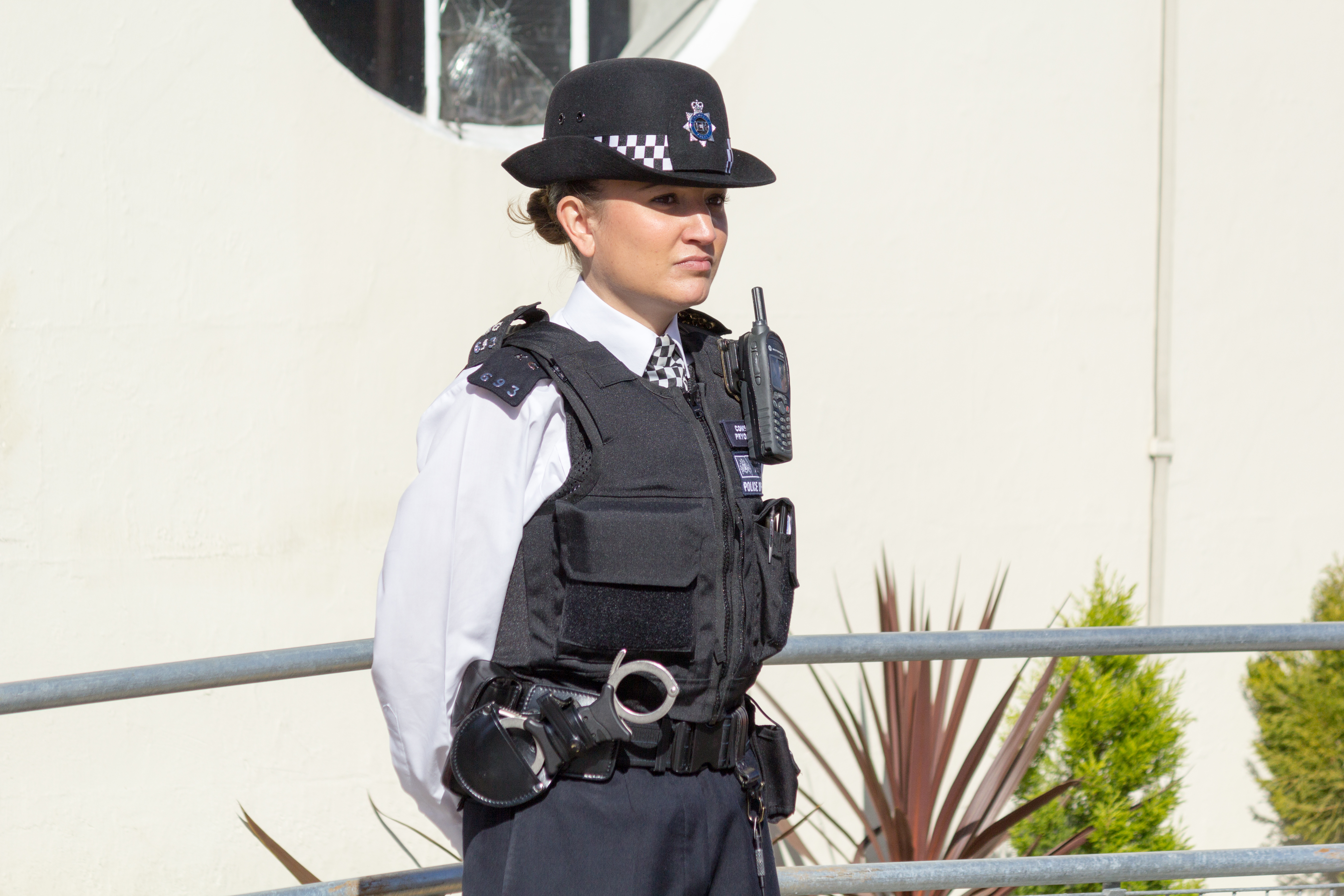
Female officers in the UK typically wear a bowler cap, as opposed to a peaked cap or custodian helmet.

=== Ranks ===
Throughout the United Kingdom, the rank structure of police forces is identical up to the rank of chief superintendent. At higher ranks, structures are distinct within London where the Metropolitan Police Service and the City of London Police have a series of commander and commissioner ranks as their top ranks whereas other UK police forces have assistants, deputies and a chief constable as their top ranks. All commissioners and chief constables are equal in rank.

Police community support officers (PCSOs) were introduced following the passing of the Police Reform Act 2002, although some have criticised these as being a cheap alternative to fully trained police officers.

=== Uniform and equipment ===
Uniforms, the issuing of firearms, the type of patrol cars, and other equipment vary by force. The custodian helmet, which is synonymous with the "bobby on the beat" image, is frequently worn by male officers in England and Wales (and formerly in Scotland), while the equivalent for female officers is the "bowler" hat. The flat peaked cap is worn by officers on mobile patrol and higher-ranking officers.

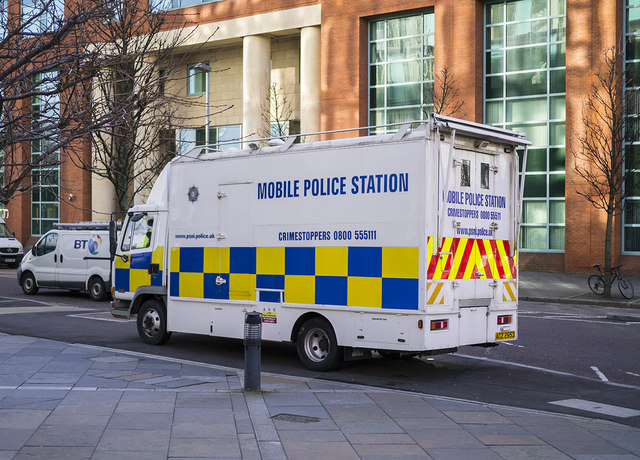
A mobile police station in Northern Ireland

Unlike police in most other developed countries, the vast majority of British police officers do not carry firearms on standard patrol; they carry an ASP baton and CS gas or PAVA spray. Officers are becoming increasingly trained in the use of and equipped with the TASER X2 as another tactical option.

==== Firearms ====
As of 2022, there were 142,526 police officers in England and Wales, 6,192 of whom were firearms authorised. Every territorial force has a specialist Firearms Unit, which maintains armed response vehicles to respond to firearms-related emergency calls. The Police Service of Northern Ireland, Belfast International Airport Constabulary, Belfast Harbour Police, Civil Nuclear Constabulary, and the Ministry of Defence Police are routinely armed.

London's Metropolitan Police firearms unit is the Specialist Firearms Command (SCO19), but every force in the United Kingdom maintains its own armed unit. Metropolitan and City of London Police operate with three officers per armed response vehicle, composed of a driver, a navigator, and an observer who gathers information about the incident and liaises with other units. Other police forces carry two authorised firearms officers instead of three.

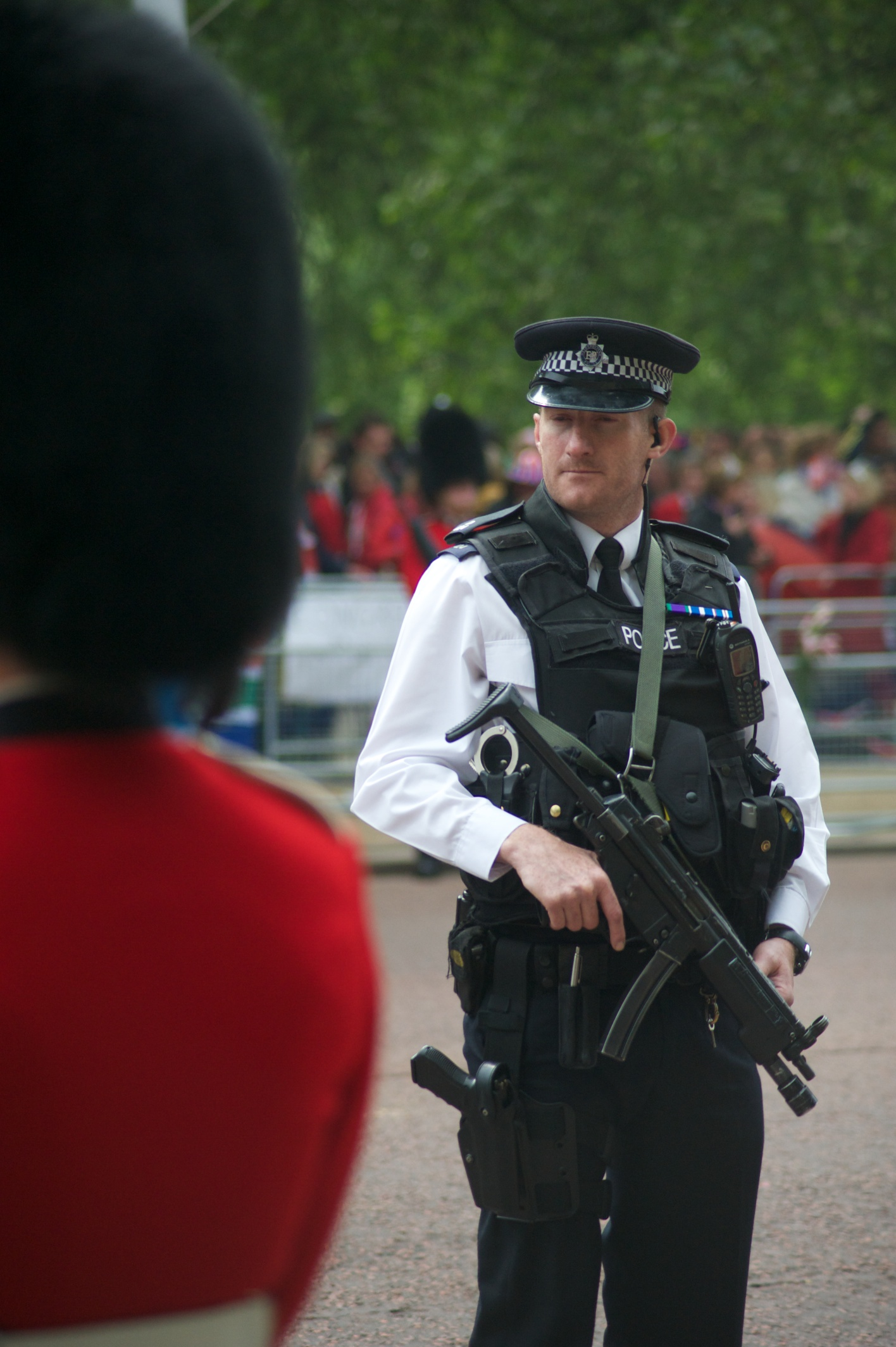
Armed Police in London

Armed police carry various weapons, ranging from semi-automatic carbines to sniper rifles, baton guns (which fire baton rounds) and shotguns. All officers also carry a sidearm. Since 2009, Tasers have been issued to armed officers as an alternative to deadly force.

==== Vehicles ====
The majority of officers on mobile patrol will do so in a marked police vehicle, namely an Incident Response Vehicle (IRV). Officers typically hold a "response" permit, allowing them to utilise blue lights and sirens to make an emergency response. Some officers may not have undergone the additional training, and as such, are only permitted to use emergency equipment when positioned at a scene or to pull over a vehicle. Officers who have undergone additional training to reach the "initial pursuit phase" standard are allowed to pursue vehicles, should they fail to stop. Vans are used as IRVs and, more specifically, to transport arrested suspects in a cage, who are unsuitable to be taken to custody in a car.

Some forces utilise Area Cars in addition to IRVs. Like IRVs, they respond to 999 calls and are manned by officers from response teams. However, officers are trained as "advanced" drivers – allowing them to drive high-performance vehicles and pursue fleeing vehicles in the tactical phase of a pursuit. Some drivers may also be trained in skills like Tactical Pursuit and Containment (TPAC).

In addition, forces' specialist units utilise a wide variety of vehicles to help perform their role effectively. Roads Policing Units (RPU) utilise performance vehicles to primarily enforce traffic laws and pursue fleeing suspects. Armed Response Vehicles (ARV) are used to transport armed officers and carry weaponry. Tactical/operational support units use larger vans, equipped with windscreen cages and/or reinforced glass, to transport officers into public order situations.

Forces also utilise unmarked vehicles for a wide variety of roles. Covert surveillance vehicles are typically not fitted with any emergency equipment, as it is not necessary. Some forces utilise unmarked response vehicles to aid in proactive work. Similarly, some roads policing vehicles and ARVs are unmarked to help officers identify offences and use pre-emptive tactics to stop a suspect fleeing. Additionally, some forces have dedicated road crime units who use high-performance vehicles to primarily focus on organised criminals using the road committing offences.

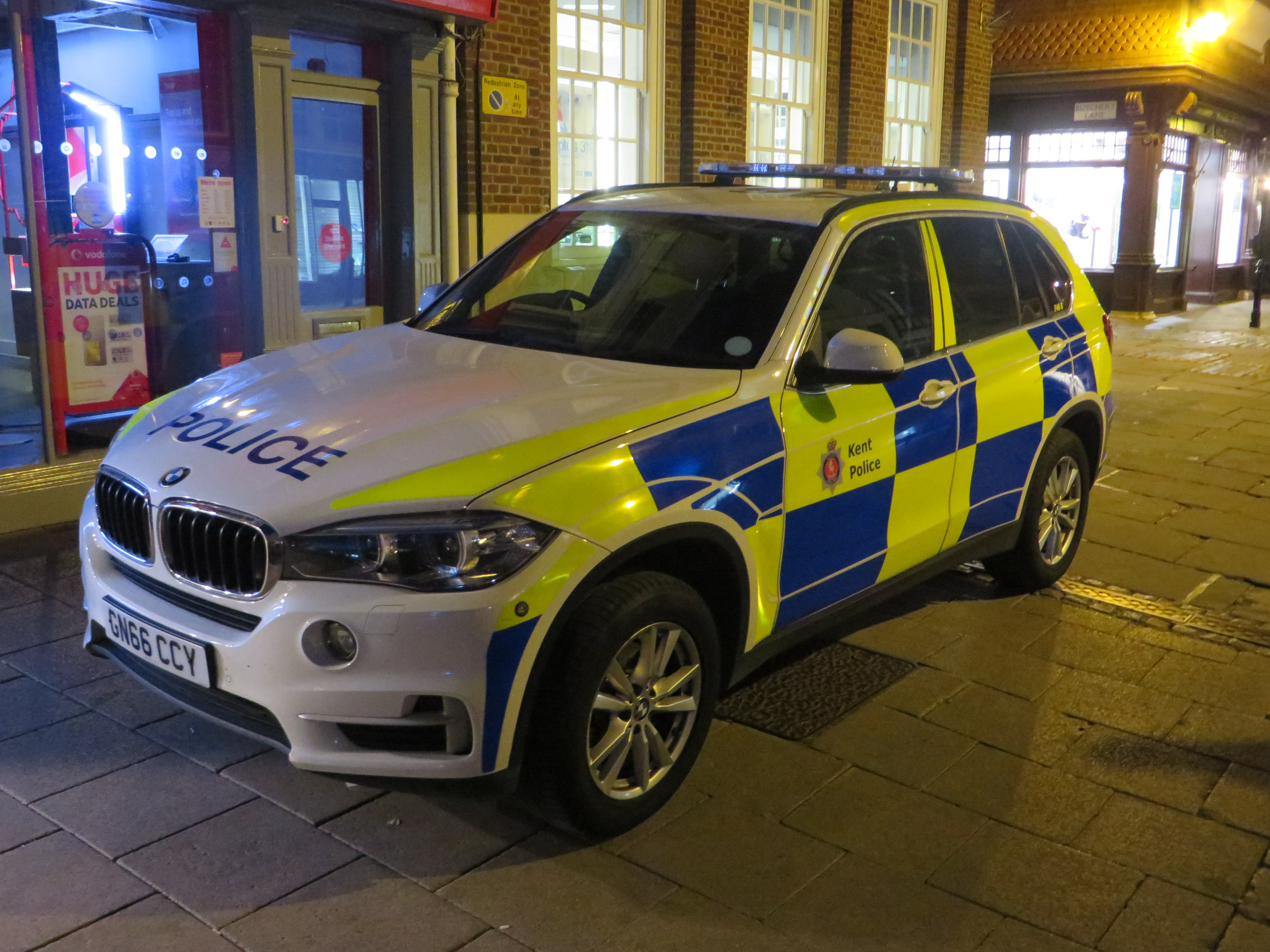
Kent Police BMW X5

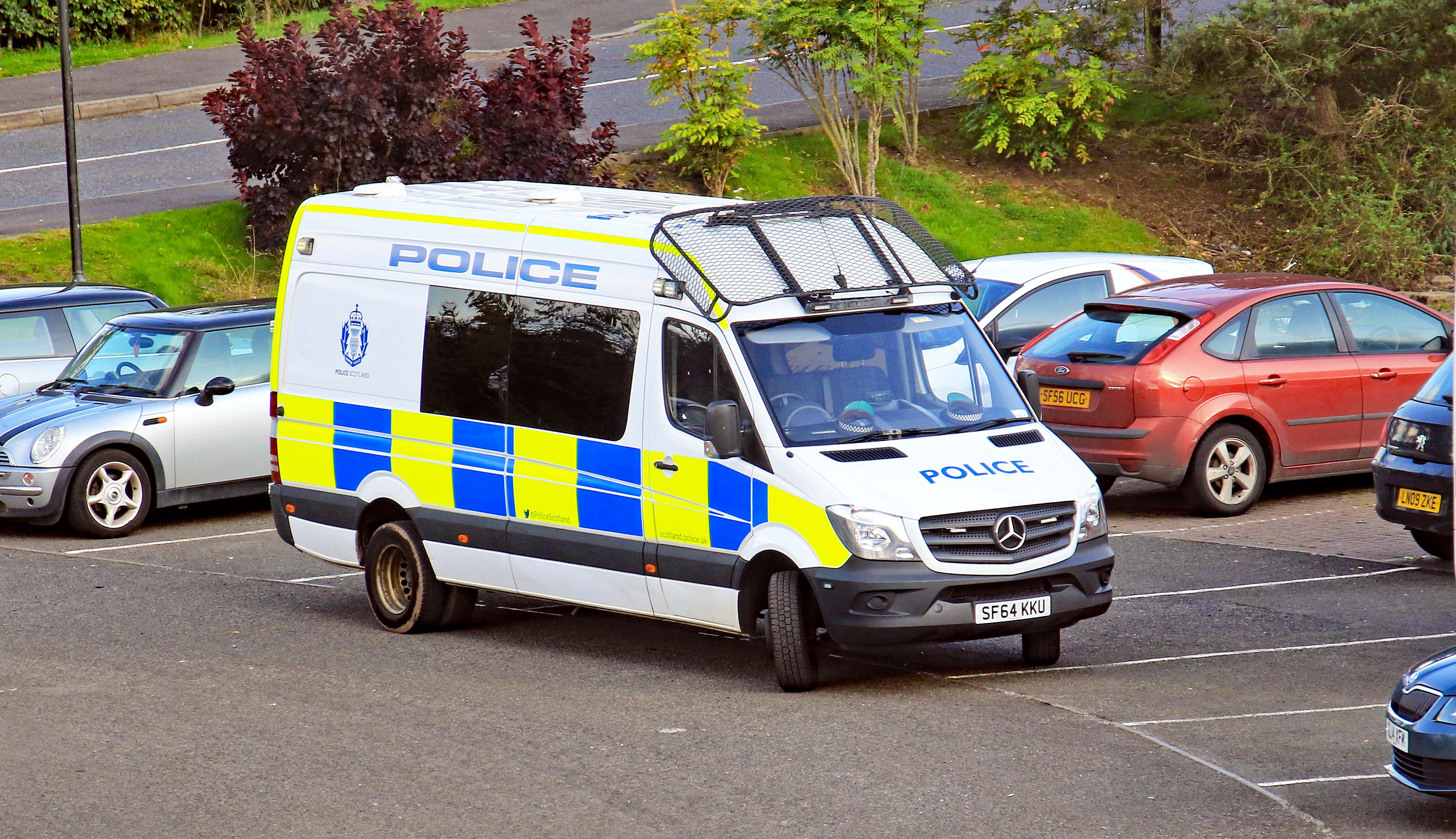
Police Scotland Mercedes-Benz Sprinter

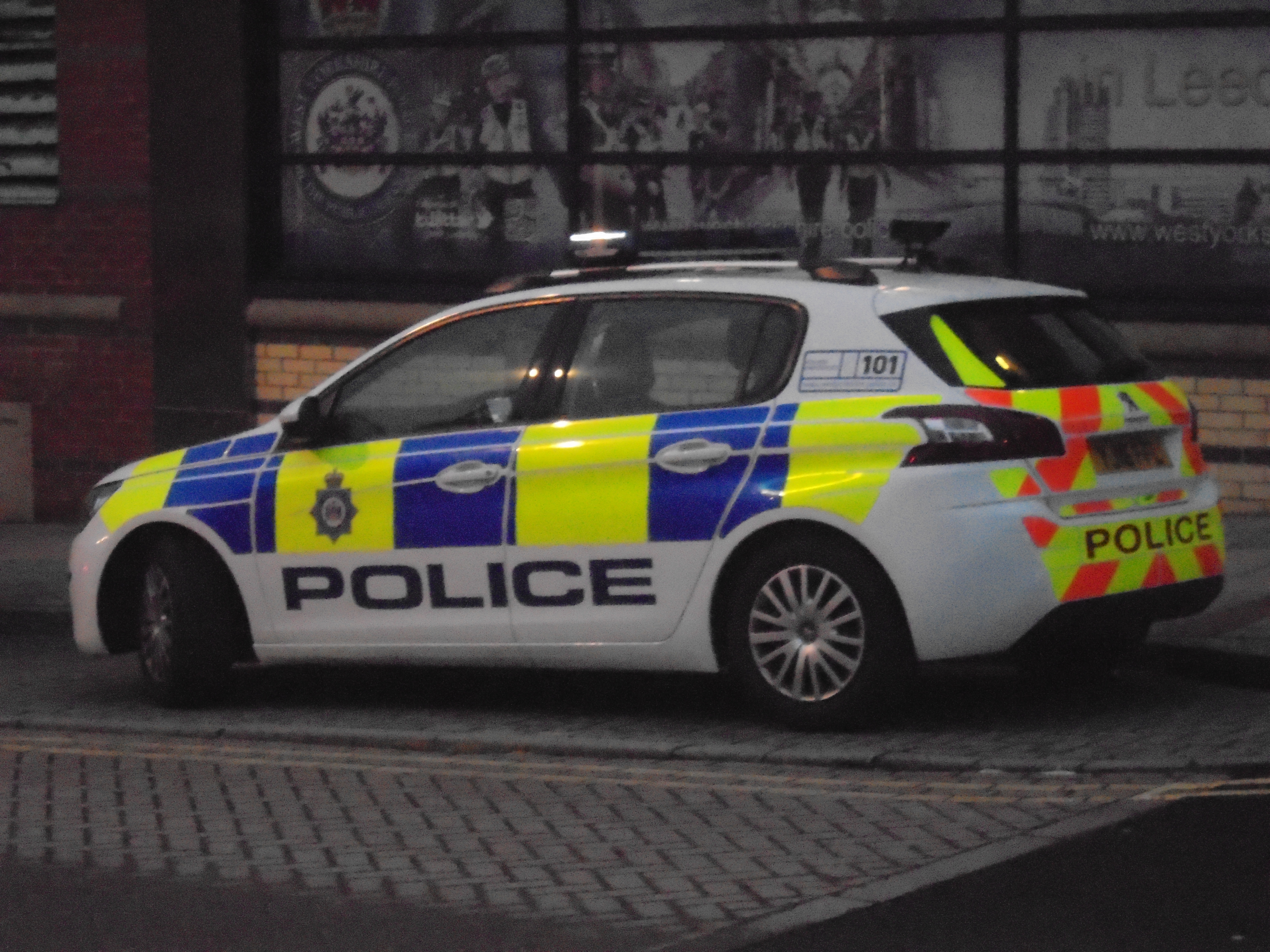
West Yorkshire Police Peugeot 308

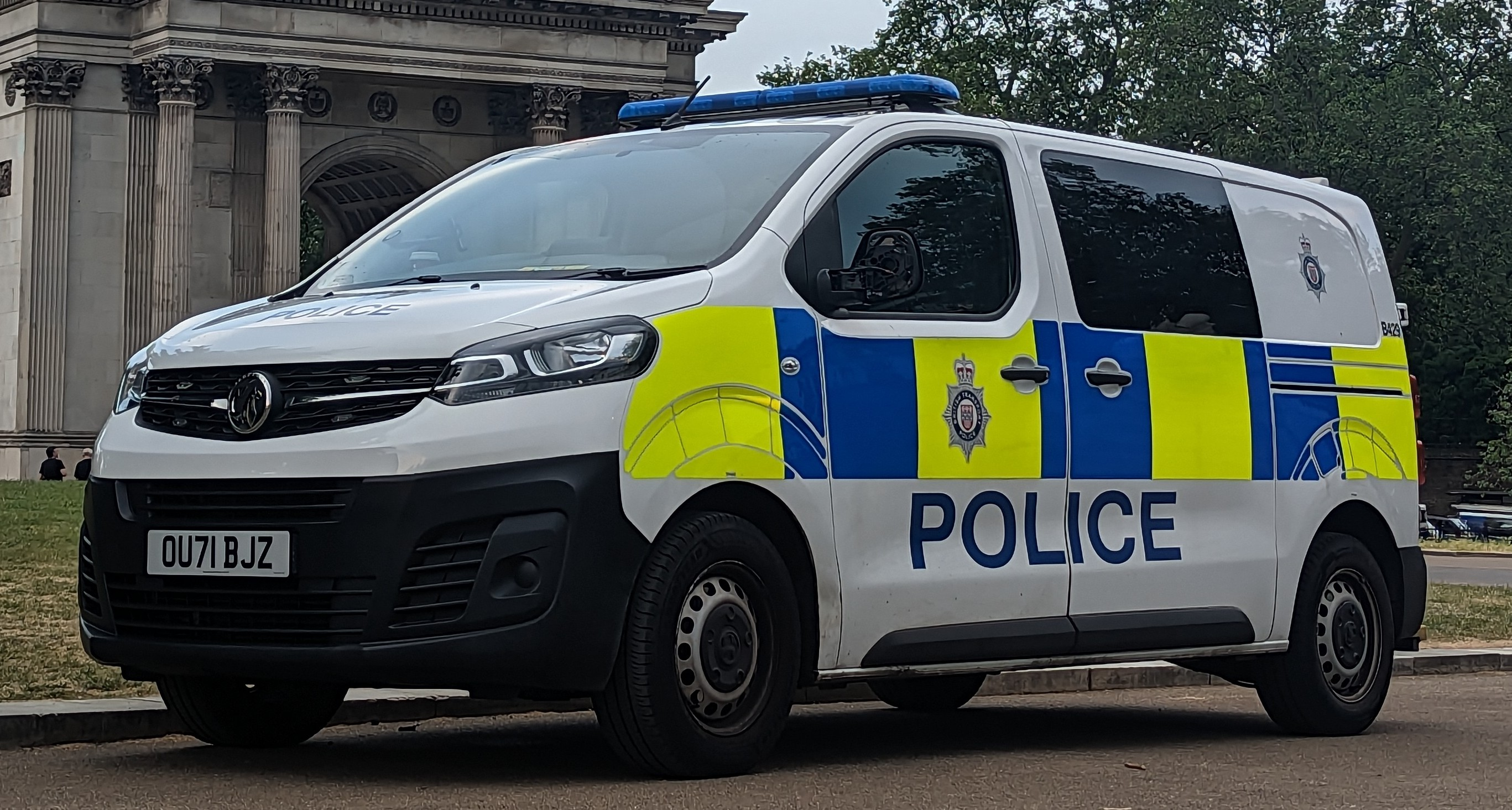
British Transport Police Vauxhall Vivaro

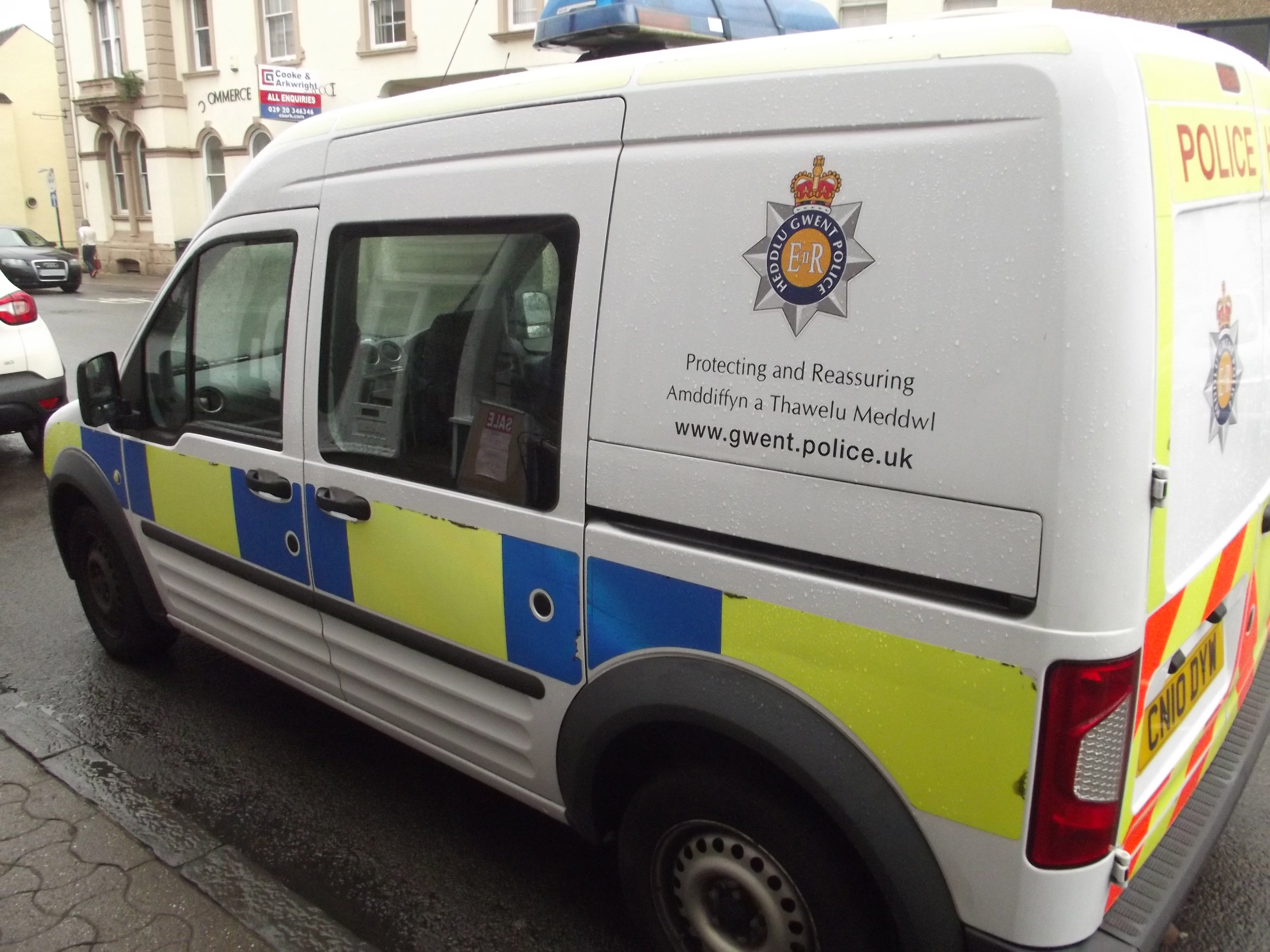
Gwent Police Ford Transit Connect

=== Initial training ===
==== England and Wales ====
The College of Policing defines six curricula for new police constables, special constables and police community support officers:

- Police Constable Degree Apprenticeship (PCDA), Degree Holder Entry Programme (DHEP) or a pre-join Policing degree course for police constables
- Initial Learning for the Special Constabulary (IL4SC) for special constables
- PCSO National Learning Programme for police community support officers

Several alternative programmes exist to join police forces, including Police Now and Fast Track programmes to the rank of Inspector and Superintendent for those with substantial management experience in other sectors.

===== Initial Learning for the Special Constabulary =====
Derived from the IPLDP, and although not linked to a formal qualification as such, IL4SC requires that the learning outcomes and National Occupational Standards (NOSs) be met to become compliant. This curriculum will bring an officer to the 'point of safe and lawful accompanied patrol'. This course equates to roughly 3.5 weeks of direct learning.

===== PCSO National Learning Programme =====
Successful completion of the PCSO NLP over a period of six months to a year will result in a non-mandatory Certificate in Policing, and this equates to 10 weeks of direct learning and consists of six mandatory units. Four of these units also feature within the IPLDP, and being a QCF qualification, this can allow for officers wishing to become police officers for 'Recognition of Prior Learning' (RPL) and the transfer of such units to the IPLDP scheme.

==== Scotland ====
All initial probationer training in Scotland is undertaken at the Scottish Police College (or SPC) at Tulliallan Castle. Recruits initially spend 12 weeks at the SPC before being posted to their divisions, and over the next two years return to the SPC several times to complete examinations and fitness tests. Training is composed of four distinct modules undertaken at various locations, with some parts being delivered locally and some centrally at the SPC.

Training for Special Constables is delivered locally at seven locations throughout Scotland over a series of evenings and/or weekends. The training is split into two parts, with the first phase being delivered in a classroom environment before being sworn in as a Special Constable, and the second phase is delivered after being sworn in. Upon successful completion of both parts of the training programme, Special Constables are awarded a certificate of achievement and are eligible to complete an abbreviated course at the Scottish Police College should they later wish to join the Police Service of Scotland as a regular officer.

=== Organisation of police forces ===
As all police forces are autonomous organisations, there is much variation in organisation and nomenclature; however, outlined below are the main strands of policing that make up police forces:

- All police forces have teams of officers who are responsible for general beat duties and response to emergency and non-emergency calls from the public. These officers are generally the most visible and will invariably be the first interface a member of the public has with police. In general terms, these officers will normally patrol by vehicle (though also on foot or bicycle in urban areas). They will generally patrol a sub-division or whole division of a police force area, or in the case of the Metropolitan Police Service, a borough. Nearly all police officers begin their careers in this area of policing, with some moving on to more specialist roles. The Metropolitan Police Service calls this area of policing 'Response Teams', whilst other forces use terms such as 'patrol', 'section', and other variations.
- Most local areas or wards in the country have at least one police officer who is involved in trying to build links with the local community and resolve long-term problems. In London, the Metropolitan Police Service addresses this area of policing with Safer Neighbourhood Teams. This entails each political ward in London having a Police Sergeant, two police constables, and a few PCSOs who are ring-fenced to address problems and build community links in their respective wards. Other police forces have similar systems but can be named 'Area officers', 'Neighbourhood officers', 'Beat Constables', and several other variations.
- Criminal Investigation Departments (CID) can be found in all police forces. Generally, these officers deal with investigations of a more complex, serious nature; however, this again can differ from force to force. Most officers within this area are detectives. Depending on the force in question, this area of policing can be further divided into a myriad of other specialist areas, such as fraud. Smaller forces tend to have detectives who deal with a wide range of varied investigations, whereas detectives in larger forces can have a very specialist remit.
- All police forces have specialist departments that deal with certain aspects of policing. Larger forces such as Greater Manchester Police, Strathclyde Police, and West Midlands Police have many and varied departments and units, such as traffic, firearms, marine, horse, and tactical support, all named differently depending on the force. Smaller forces such as Dyfed Powys Police and Warwickshire Police will have fewer specialists and will rely on cross-training, such as firearms officers also being traffic-trained officers. The Metropolitan Police, the largest force in the country, has a large number of specialist departments, some of which are unique to the Metropolitan Police due to policing the capital and its national responsibilities. For example, the Diplomatic Protection Group and Counter Terrorism Command.

==== Fixated Threat Assessment Centre ====
In the United Kingdom, the Fixated Threat Assessment Centre is a joint police/mental health unit set up in October 2006 by the Home Office, the Department of Health and Metropolitan Police Service to identify and address those individuals considered to pose a threat to VIPs or the Royal Family. They may then be referred to local health services for further assessment and potential involuntary commitment. In some cases, they may be detained by police under the section 136 powers of the Mental Health Act 1983 before referral.

==== Border Force ====
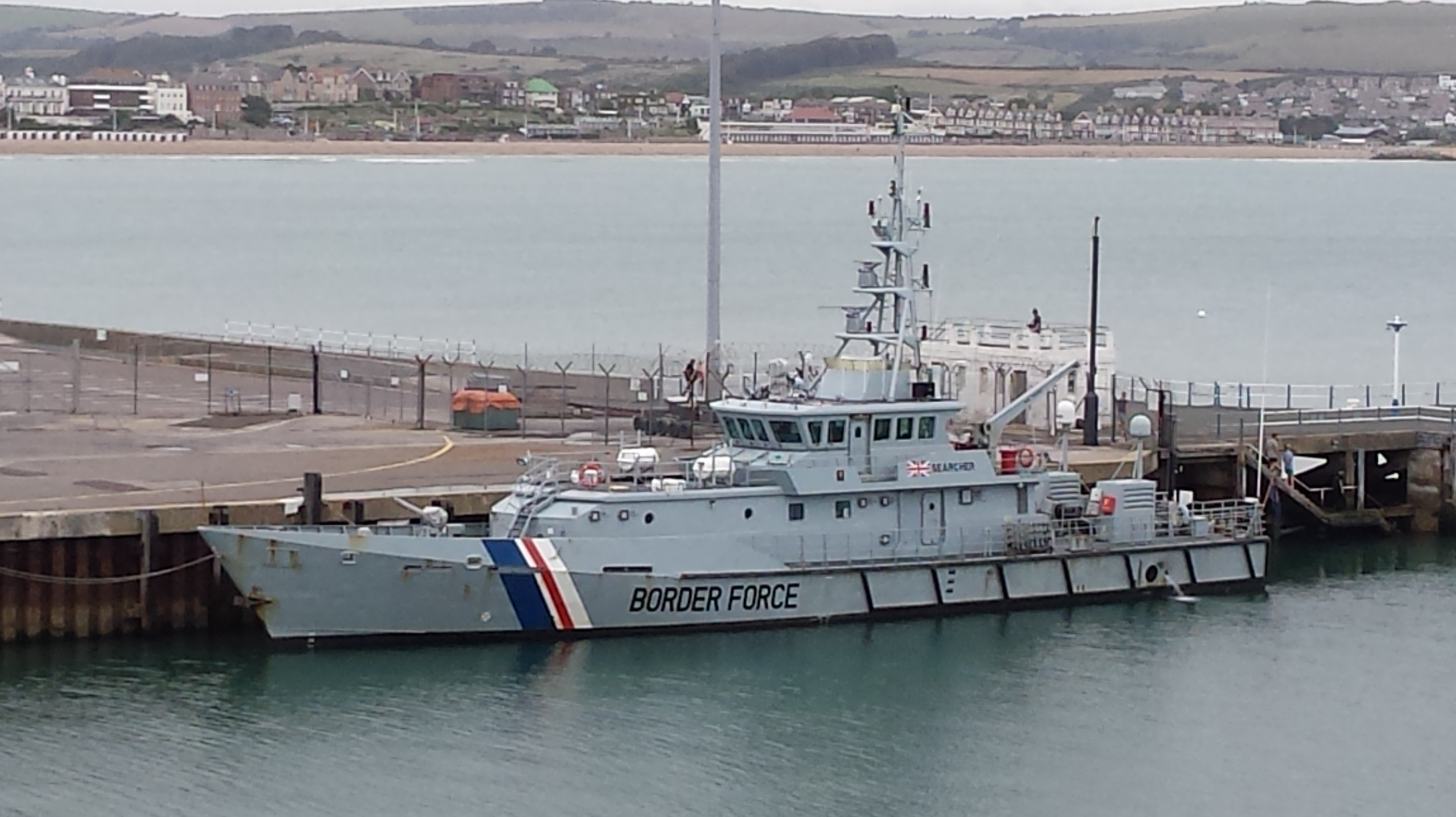
A Border Force patrol vessel

As part of the wide-ranging review of the Home Office, the then Home Secretary, John Reid, announced in July 2006 that all British immigration officers would be uniformed. On 1 April 2007, the Border and Immigration Agency (BIA) was created and commenced operation. However, there were no police officers in the Agency, a matter that attracted considerable criticism when the Agency was established: agency officers have limited powers of arrest. Further powers for designated officers within the Agency, including powers of detention pending the arrival of a police officer, were introduced by the UK Borders Act 2007.

The Government effectively admitted the shortcomings of the Agency by making several fundamental changes within a year of its commencement. On 1 April 2008, the BIA became the UK Border Agency following a merger with UKvisas, the port of entry functions of HM Revenue and Customs. The Home Secretary, Jacqui Smith, announced that the UK Border Agency (UKBA) "...will bring together the work of the Border and Immigration Agency, UK Visas and parts of HM Revenue and Customs at the border, [and] will work closely with the police and other law enforcement agencies to improve border controls and security."

Within months of this, the Home Secretary revealed (in a 16-page response to a report by Lord Carlile, the independent reviewer of UK terrorism legislation) that the Home Office would issue a Green Paper proposing to take forward proposals by the Association of Chief Police Officers (England and Wales) for the establishment of a new 3,000-strong national border police force to work alongside the Agency.

Following a major enquiry into the UK Border Agency that exposed significant flaws in the operation of border controls, the Home Secretary, Theresa May, announced in 2012 that the Border Force, which is responsible for manning all points of entry into the United Kingdom, would be split from the control of the UKBA and become a separate organisation with direct accountability to ministers and a "law-enforcement ethos". Brian Moore, the former Chief Constable of Wiltshire Police, was appointed as the first head of the new UKBF.

==== Overseas British Territories and Crown Dependencies Police Forces ====
The Crown Dependencies and British Overseas Territories have their own police forces, the majority of which use the British model. Because they are not part of the United Kingdom, they are not answerable to the British Government; instead they are organised by and are responsible to their own governments (an exception to this is the Sovereign Base Areas Police; as the SBAs' existence is solely for the benefit of the British armed forces and do not have full overseas territory status, the SBA Police are responsible to the Ministry of Defence). Because they are based on the British model of policing, these police forces conform to the standards set out by the British government, which includes voluntarily submitting themselves to inspection by the HMIC. Their vehicles share similarities with the vehicles owned by forces based in the UK, such as the use of Battenburg markings.

==== Overseas secondments ====
UK police officers have often served overseas as part of secondments to United Nations Police (UNPOL), Organization for Security and Co-operation in Europe (OSCE), and European Union Police (EUPOL). These are typically training and mentoring posts, but sometimes involve carrying out executive policing duties.

==== Overseas police forces in the UK ====
There are certain instances where police forces of other nations operate to a limited degree in the United Kingdom:

- The "Police aux Frontières" or PAF (French Border Police), a division of the Police Nationale, is permitted to operate in regard to Eurostar rail services through the Channel Tunnel. This includes on Eurostar trains to London, within the international terminal at St Pancras station, at Ebbsfleet International and Ashford International railway stations, and at the Cheriton Parc Le Shuttle terminal (alongside French Customs officials). The PAF also operates at Dover Ferry terminals. This arrangement is reciprocated to the British Transport Police, UK Border Force, and UK Customs Officers on Paris-bound trains and within the terminal at Paris Gare du Nord, Coquelles (Le Shuttle), Gare de Lille-Europe, Bruxelles-Midi/Brussel-Zuid and the Calais, Dunkerque, and Boulogne ferry terminals. The French police officers, who carry firearms while on duty in France, are not permitted to carry their firearms in the London Terminal; the firearms must be left on the train.
- Garda Síochána (Irish Police), under an agreement between the Republic of Ireland and the United Kingdom, has the right, alongside the Radiological Protection Institute of Ireland, to carry out inspections of the Sellafield nuclear facility in Cumbria.
- In 2006, a small number of officers from the Policja (Polish Police) were seconded to the North Wales Police to assist with the supervision of foreign (largely eastern European) truck traffic, largely on European route E22 (the A55 road). The Chief Constable of North Wales has publicly stated (November 2006) that he is considering directly recruiting a small number of officers from Poland to assist with policing the substantial population of Polish people that have migrated to his area since Poland acceded to the EU in 2004.
- Military Police of forces present in the UK within the terms of the Visiting Forces Act 1952 are permitted to travel to/from relevant premises in uniform, and their (usually distinctive) vehicles will occasionally be seen. Their powers (including the carrying of firearms) are generally limited by that and other legislation to those necessary for the performance of duties related to their own forces and to those possessed by the general public.

===== Greater London =====
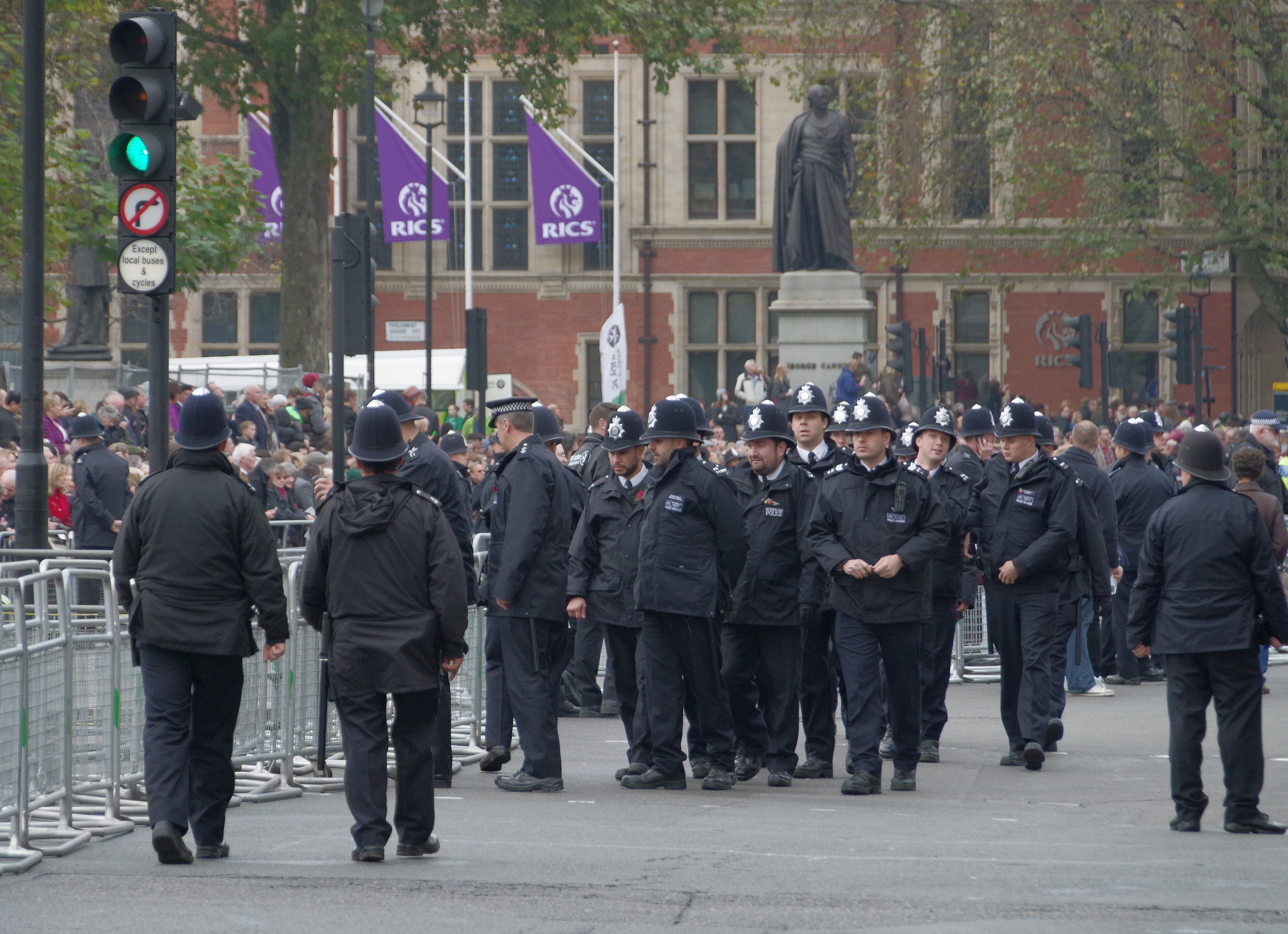
British police officers

One of the most common merger proposals is to merge the City of London Police and London operations of the British Transport Police into the Metropolitan Police.

The 2005–06 merger proposals had not included Greater London. This was due to two separate reviews of policing in the capital. The first was a review by the Department of Transport into the future role and function of the British Transport Police. The second was a review by the Attorney-General into national measures for combating fraud (the City of London Police is one of the major organisations for combating economic crime). Both the Metropolitan Police Commissioner, Sir Ian Blair, and the Mayor, Ken Livingstone, stated that they would like to see a single police force in London, with the Metropolitan Police also absorbing the functions of the British Transport Police in London. However, the proposal to merge both the BTP and City forces with the Met drew significant criticism from several areas: the House of Commons Transport Select Committee severely criticised the idea of the Metropolitan Police taking over policing of the rail network in a report published on 16 May 2006, while the City of London Corporation and several major financial institutions in the City made public their opposition to the City Police merging with the Met. In a statement on 20 July 2006, the Transport Secretary announced that there would be no structural or operational changes to the British Transport Police, effectively ruling out any merger The interim report by the Attorney General's fraud review recognised the role taken by the City Police as the lead force in London and the South-East for tackling fraud, and made a recommendation that, should a national lead force be required, the City Police, with its expertise, would be an ideal candidate to take this role. This view was confirmed on the publication of the final report, which recommended that the City of London Police's Fraud Squad should be the national lead force in combatting fraud, to "act as a centre of excellence, disseminate best practice, give advice on complex inquiries in other regions, and assist with or direct the most complex of such investigations".

Separate from the proposals raised by the Mayor of London and Metropolitan Police Commissioner was a plan by the government to reform policing in the Royal Parks. Since 1872, this had been the responsibility of the Royal Parks Constabulary. A report by former Metropolitan Police Assistant Commissioner Anthony Speed provided three options to reform the RPC, and it was decided that it should be merged with the Metropolitan Police. The Met took over responsibility for policing the Royal Parks on 1 April 2004 with the formation of the Royal Parks Operational Command Unit. The full merger and abolition of the Royal Parks Constabulary took place in May 2006.

In May 2016, following his election, the Mayor of London Sadiq Khan ordered a review, led by Lord Harris, of London's preparedness in the face of potential terror attacks. Amongst the recommendations, which were published in October 2016, was a revisiting of the idea of merging the Metropolitan Police, City of London Police, and British Transport Police. In commenting, both the City Police and BTP cautioned against the proposal.

=== Funding ===
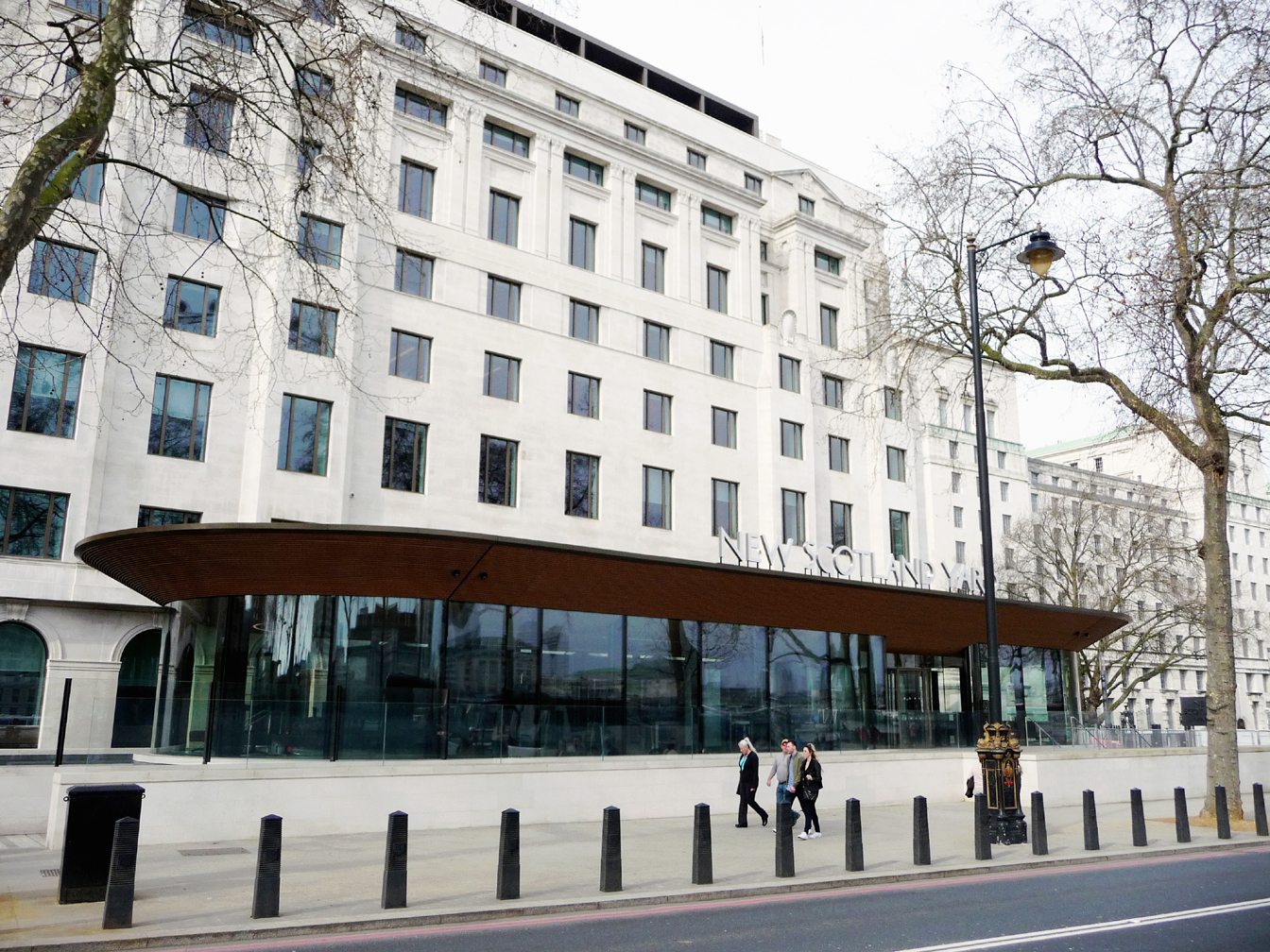
New Scotland Yard is the headquarters of the Metropolitan Police Service

The police are funded both by the central government and by the local government. Central government funding is calculated based on a formula, based on several population and socio-economic factors which are used to determine the expected cost of policing the area.

For the 2017/18 fiscal year, the budget for local Police and Crime Commissioners to spend on police is £11 billion (equivalent to £14.11 billion or US$18.03 billion in 2024) with an extra £1.5 billion allocated to counter-terrorism and other special programmes. The combined funding will reduce from £12.3 billion in 2017/18 to £11.6 billion (equivalent to £13.61 billion or US$17.39 billion in 2024) in 2020/21. His Majesty's Inspectorate of Constabulary (HMIC) estimates that officer numbers will fall by around 2%.

According to the National Audit Office, funding was decreased between 2011 and 2016 by 22% in real terms and police officer numbers fell by 20,000 from 2010 to 2017. Funding levels stayed the same in real terms between 2015 and 2018, with a decrease in central government funding made up for by an increase in local government funding. Increased spending in some areas such as counter-terrorism has been offset by decreased spending in other departments. In 2018 further funding cuts will force further cuts in the numbers of police officers. 80% of UK people believe Britain is less safe due to cuts to police funding.

In 2017, a report from the Inspectorate found that most police forces were providing a good service, though it noted that some aspects such as investigations and neighbourhood policing were being compromised by "rationing" and cutbacks. A report from the Inspectorate in March 2018 had similar findings; it reported improvement in neighbourhood policing and highlighted issues with response policing. Several current and former chief constables were raising concerns about whether the police can meet foreseeable challenges with current levels of funding.

== Issues ==
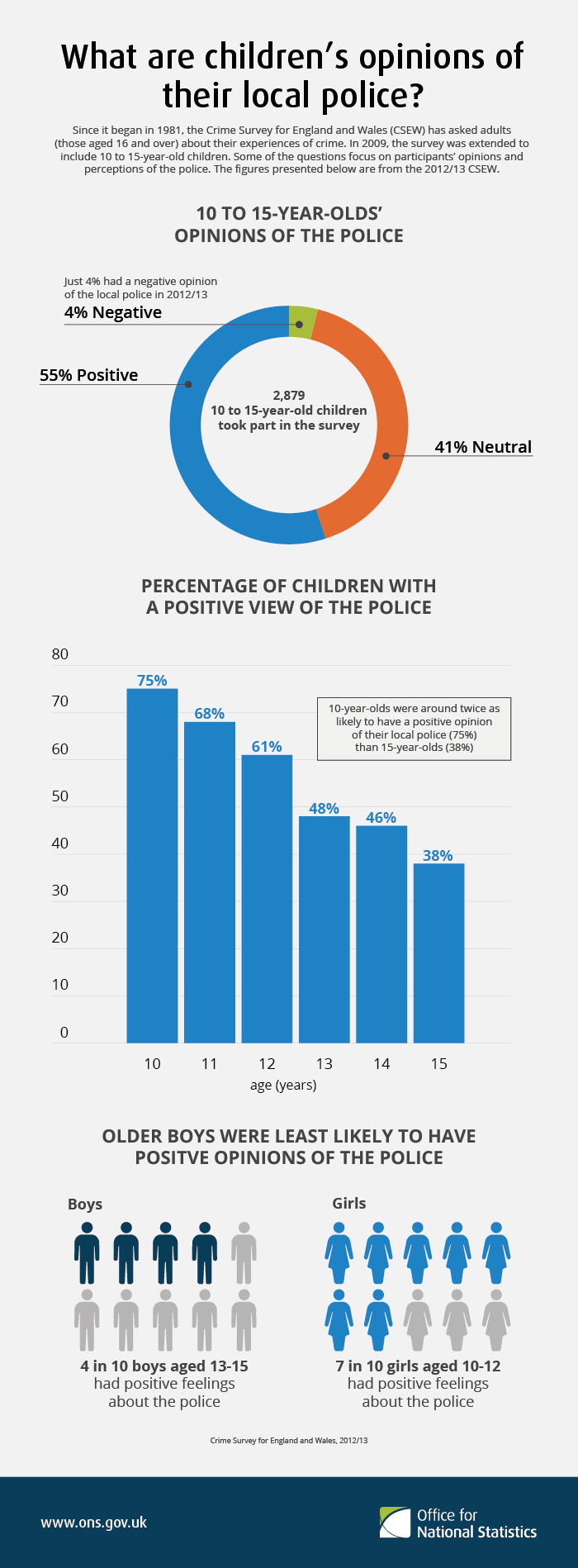
Children's opinions of their local police in England and Wales in 2012/13.

=== Deaths after contact with the police ===
The police service is often criticised for incidents that result in deaths due to police firearms usage or in police custody, as well as the lack of competence and impartiality in investigations (in England and Wales only) by the Independent Police Complaints Commission after these events. The Economist stated in 2009:

Bad apples ... are seldom brought to justice: no policeman has ever been convicted of murder or manslaughter for a death following police contact, though there have been more than 400 such deaths in the past ten years alone. The IPCC is at best overworked and at worst does not deserve the "I" in its name.

— The Economist

Numbers of deaths in or following police custody
Year	Nos. of deaths	Notes
2011/12	15	There were two fatal police shootings, and 39 people died from suicide following contact with the police.
2012/13	15	Nearly half of those who died had known mental health issues, and four of those who died had been restrained by police officers. There were 64 deaths by suicide within 48 hours of release from police custody.
2013/14	11	The number of people recorded as having committed suicide within 48 hours of release from police custody was 68, a ten-year high.
2014/15	17	There was one fatal police shooting, and there were 69 suicides following custody.

==== Controversial shootings ====
The policy under which police officers in England and Wales use firearms has resulted in controversy. Notorious examples include the Stephen Waldorf shooting in 1983, the deliberate fatal shootings of James Ashley in 1998, Harry Stanley in 1999, and Jean Charles de Menezes in 2005, and the accidental non-fatal shooting of Abdul Kahar in 2006.

==== Deaths in police custody ====
From 1990 to July 2012, 950 deaths occurred in police custody.

In 1997/98, 69 people died in police custody or following contact with the police across England and Wales; 26 resulted from deliberate self-harm.

There are two defined categories of death in custody issued by the Home Office:

Category A: This category also encompasses deaths of those under arrest who are held in temporary police accommodation or have been taken to hospital following arrest. It also includes those who die, following arrest, whilst in a police vehicle.

- they have been taken to a police station after being arrested for an offence, or
- they are arrested at a police station after attending voluntarily at the station or accompanying a constable to it, and are detained there or are detained elsewhere in the charge of a constable, except that a person who is at a court after being charged is not in police detention for those purposes.

Category B: Where the deceased was otherwise in the hands of the police or death resulted from the actions of a police officer in the purported execution of his duty.

- when suspects are being interviewed by the police but have not been detained;
- when persons are actively attempting to evade arrest;
- when persons are stopped and searched or questioned by the police; and
- when persons are in police vehicles (other than whilst in police detention).

Hundreds of people kill themselves within 48 hours of being released from police custody.

=== Civil unrest and misconduct ===
- The coal miners' strike (1984–1985) saw thousands of police from various forces deployed to maintain public order and to prevent intimidation of those continuing to work during a national strike by miners, frequently resulting in violent confrontation.
- The Channel 4 Dispatches 2006 documentary Undercover Copper showed police officers watching pornography while on duty, raising questions of standards within UK police forces.

=== Racism ===
The Macpherson Report coined the phrase "institutionalised racism" to describe policies and procedures that adversely affect persons from ethnic minority groups after the death of Stephen Lawrence.

In 2003, ten police officers from Greater Manchester Police, North Wales Police and Cheshire Constabulary were forced to resign after a BBC documentary, The Secret Policeman, shown on 21 October, alleged racism among recruits at Bruche Police National Training Centre at Warrington. In March 2005 it was reported that minor disciplinary action would be taken against twelve other officers in connection with the programme, but that they would not lose their jobs. In November 2003, allegations were made that some police officers were members of the British National Party.

In June 2015, the Metropolitan Police Commissioner, Sir Bernard Hogan-Howe, said there was "some justification" in claims that the Metropolitan Police Service is "institutionally racist":

I have always said if other people think we are institutionally racist, then we are. It is no good for me to say we are not and then say you must believe me; it's nonsense, if they believe that. I think it is a label, but in some sense, there is a truth there for some people .... You're very much more likely to be stopped and searched if you're a young black man. I can't explain that fully. I can give you reasons, but I can't fully explain it. So there is some justification ... I think in some ways society is institutionally racist. We see a lack of representation in many fields, of which the police are one.

The question of institutional racism arose again as a topic of controversy during the Covid-19 pandemic. The stop and search rate for all demographics rose, but increased more for certain ethnic (and age) groups. In the first lockdown, the rate of stop and search for Black and Asian people (and individuals aged 18-24) rose by 109% or more, for white people it rose by 89%. Before the pandemic, stop and search was already controversial due to disproportionate applications of it. Further, the style of stop and search used was reported to be cynical and unfair, with numerous incidences of officers using erroneous reasons to conduct a stop. Disproportionality was also noted in the deployment of Fixed Penalty Notices. Additionally, during the pandemic, the Metropolitan Police experienced controversy due to the kidnapping, rape, and murder of Sarah Everard by then serving Metropolitan Police Officer Wayne Couzens. This led to a report on practices and culture within the Metropolitan Police by Baroness Louise Casey, who concluded that the Metropolitan Police were institutionally racist. The Angiolini Inquiry into Wayne Couzens also discovered racist messages he had sent to other police officers via WhatsApp.

=== Privacy ===
At the beginning of 2005 it was announced that the Police Information Technology Organisation (PITO) had signed an eight-year £122 million (equivalent to £197.47 million or US$252.39 million in 2024) contract to introduce biometric identification technology. PITO are using CCTV facial recognition systems to identify known suspects; a future link to the proposed National Identity Register has been suggested by some. In January 2026, Home Secretary Shabana Mahmood announced an expansion of the use of the technology. The plans included increasing the number of mobile Live Facial Recognition (LFR) camera vans from 10 to 50, making them available to all police forces in England and Wales to scan public spaces for individuals on police watchlists.

=== Freedom of speech ===
The police have sometimes been accused of infringing on free speech. In December 2005, author Lynette Burrows was interviewed by police after expressing her opinion on BBC Radio 5 Live that homosexuals should not be allowed to adopt children. The following month, Sir Iqbal Sacranie was investigated by police for stating the Islamic view that homosexuality is a sin. The police have also been accused of taking sides in political controversy by, for example, marching in uniform at politicised Pride events. In 2025, Mr Justice Linden ruled that Northumbria Police had not acted impartially. He said: “The fact that the officers had publicly stated their support for transgender rights by taking part in the 2024 march would be likely to give the impression that they may not deal with the matter fairly and impartially.”

=== Photography of police ===
Section 76 of the Counter-Terrorism Act 2008 came into force on 15 February 2009 making it an offence to elicit, attempt to elicit, or publish information "...of a kind likely to be useful to a person committing or preparing an act of terrorism" about: a member of His Majesty's Armed Forces; a constable, the Security Service, the Secret Intelligence Service, or Government Communications Headquarters. Any person found guilty faces 10 years' imprisonment and an unlimited fine. It is a defence for a person charged with this offence to prove that they had a reasonable excuse for their action. It is not otherwise illegal to photograph or film a police officer in a public place per se. Any film or photography recorded whilst a constable is dealing with an incident may be seized as it becomes evidence under section 19 of PACE 1984.

=== Policing of public protests ===
Public order policing presents challenges to the approach of policing by consent. In April 2009, a total of 145 complaints were made following clashes between police and protesters at the G20 summit. Incidents including the death of 47-year-old Ian Tomlinson, minutes after an alleged assault by a police officer, and a separate alleged assault on a woman by a police officer, has led to criticism of police tactics during protests. In response, Metropolitan Police Commissioner Sir Paul Stephenson asked Her Majesty's Chief Inspector of Constabulary (HMIC) to review policing tactics, including the practice of kettling. These events sparked a debate in the UK about the relationship between the police, media and public, and the independence of the Independent Police Complaints Commission. In response to the concerns, the Chief Inspector of Constabulary, Denis O'Connor, published a 150-page report in November 2009 that aimed to restore Britain's consent-based model of policing.

=== Police undercover conduct ===
During 2010 and 2011, it emerged that, while engaged in covert infiltration of protest groups, undercover police officers had entered into intimate relationships with several people on false pretences and under assumed aliases, in some cases sharing a home, making plans for weddings, or fathering children, only to vanish after some years when their role was complete. In 2015, a public inquiry under a senior judge was announced. In November 2015, the Metropolitan Police published an unreserved apology in which it exonerated and apologised to those women who had been deceived and stated the methodology had constituted abuse and a "gross violation" with severely harmful effects, as part of a settlement of their cases. In 2016, new cases continued to come to light.

=== Capacity to solve crimes ===
The way in which police forces record crime in the UK has been subject to a series of improvements since the late 1990's. This created a dramatic, but misleading increase in police reported crime compared to a steady decrease in crime reported by victims over that time, a trend observed both in the UK and internationally.

Nationally, detection rates have been falling as police-reported crime has been rising. In 2024, there was even a zero detection rate for crimes within 166 neighborhood areas under the responsibility of the Metropolitan Police Service (MPS). More generally, positive outcome rates for the MPS were just 7.3% on average, with some crimes (criminal damage and offences against vehicles) as low as 0.9% in 2022/2023, while drug offences had a 38% detection rate. Corresponding figures for 2010/2011 were far higher, with an average total of 24%.

However, an increase in crimes reported means the same volume of detections is therefore divided by a much larger number of total recorded offences. While this does not fully explain the drop in detection rates, it is thought to have contributed to it. Other reasons include lack of police resources and that the crimes the police record disproportionately affect those offences which (in law, if not by the public) are treated as the least serious.

=== Police sex abuse allegations ===
In 1988, 19-year-old PC Eileen Waters alleged that another officer raped her in the police hostel section at her work, having only been in the force for around one year. She reported it the next day to colleagues. The Evening Standard reported that she was then targeted by a "horrific campaign of intimidation which led to a bloodstained truncheon being left in her locker." After 24 years of court cases, hearings, and her case appearing before law lords in the House of Lords, in 2012, she was compensated by the Metropolitan Police, receiving £270,000 (equivalent to £374,364.09 or US$478,472.79 in 2024)

In 2016, allegations of serious sexual abuse were made against hundreds of police officers in England and Wales. Several forces in England and Wales received 436 allegations of abuse of power for sexual gain against 436 police officers, including 20 police community support officers and eight staff in the two years to March 2016. Mike Cunningham, inspector of constabulary and former chief constable of Staffordshire police said: "It's the most serious form of corruption. It is an exploitation of power where the guardian becomes an abuser. What can be worse than a guardian abusing the trust and confidence of an abused person? There can be no greater violation of public trust".

=== Brexit ===
Before Brexit, there were concerns that the UK might lose access to important cross-border databases of criminals, which would make it harder for the police to keep the public safe. Police leaders warned of "a significant loss of operational capacity" if the UK were to leave the EU without an agreement on policing. The Association of Police and Crime Commissioners sent a letter to Home Secretary Sajid Javid stressing the need for co-operation with European policing and justice organisations after March 2019. The letter stated that 32 measures were used daily, including the European Arrest Warrant, the Schengen Information System (SIS) – a database giving alerts about individuals – and the European Criminal Records Information System. The letter stressed the importance and mutual benefit of continued cooperation between the UK and Europe to face mutual threats.

The loss of access to SIS has led to police officers being unable to see alerts on criminals from EU countries, and vice versa. UK police agencies have replaced these with Interpol, but this comes with additional administrative overhead and reduced powers, and they are unable to know if they are missing any entries that are in SIS but not in Interpol systems. The loss of access to European Investigation Orders has been especially damaging. However, the UK has retained access to DNA, fingerprint, vehicle, and flight data.

=== Allegations of "two-tier policing" ===
Critics have accused the police of "two-tier policing", claiming that the enforcement is biased and treats people from certain political or racial groups more harshly than others. These allegations have been popularised with the outbreak of Gaza war protests since 2023 and after the 2024 riots, and have been promoted by the right and far-right, and to a lesser extent the far-left. Critics on the left, such as Jamie Driscoll, argue that the police have a right-wing bias and are harsher against left-wingers, ethnic minorities, and pro-Palestinian groups. Critics on the right, such as Nigel Farage and Robert Jenrick, argue that the police have a left-wing bias and are more harsh against right-wingers and white people, and the white working class in particular.

Examples of prominent policing incidents in which the accusation have been made include a peaceful protest by Just Stop Oil climate protesters in July 2024, in which some protesters were given five-year sentences while a far-right rioter who assaulted a police officer was given a three-year sentence. In 2025, the government proscribed Palestine Action as a terrorist organisation, leading to the arrested of hundreds of peaceful protestors who expressed their support for the organisation. Protesters believed that the police had targeted them disproportionately, with far-right groups like the English Defence League still not proscribed and their supporters not persecuted. In June 2026 allegations arose again following the murder of Henry Nowak by British Sikh Vickrum Digwa; after being stabbed and later falsely accused of a racist attack by Digwa, Nowak was handcuffed by police and died shortly afterwards.

== Jurisdictions and territories ==
As of 2021, there were 39 territorial police forces in England, 4 in Wales, one in Scotland, and one in Northern Ireland. Every geographic place in the United Kingdom is defined in law as part of certain police area. (Note: In England and Wales, these areas rarely follow local government or county boundaries.) In England and Wales, this is currently defined in Section 1 of the Police Act 1996. A police area defines the geographic area for which a territorial police force is responsible for policing. This is different from legal jurisdiction (see below). Special police forces (such as the BTP) do not have police areas, and ultimately the Chief Constable of a territorial police force is responsible for maintaining law and order throughout his/her police area, even if, for example, BTP have a presence at railway stations within the police area. Scotland and Northern Ireland have national police forces.

In England, Police forces are funded by a combination of sources, including central government and through the police precept tax levied as part of Council Tax, which is charged by local governments. The local police force precept can be increased via referendum. Since 2013, police forces in England (and Wales) have been overseen by a directly elected Police and crime commissioner (PCC) who holds the force to account for the public. PCCs do not have operational control of the police force; operational management of the police force is the responsibility of the chief constable in most English police forces, although the equivalent position is referred to as commissioner in the London Metropolitan Police and the City of London Police. Administration of police matters is not generally affected by the Government of Wales Act 2006.

=== England and Wales ===
==== England ====
Territorial Police Forces of England
Police force	Established	Police area	Commissioner (a/o July 2023)
Avon and Somerset Police	1974	Bristol, South Gloucestershire, and Somerset	Labour
Bedfordshire Police	1966	Bedford, Central Bedfordshire, and Luton	Conservative
Cambridgeshire Constabulary	1965	Cambridgeshire and Peterborough	Conservative
Cheshire Constabulary	1857	Cheshire including Chester, Borough of Halton and Borough of Warrington.	Labour
City of London Police	1839	City of London	No PCC, police responsible to the City of London Corporation
Cleveland Police	1974	Hartlepool, Middlesbrough, Redcar and Cleveland, and Stockton-on-Tees	Conservative
Cumbria Constabulary	1974	Cumberland and Westmorland and Furness	Conservative
Derbyshire Constabulary	1967	Derby and Derbyshire	Conservative
Devon and Cornwall Police	1967	Cornwall, Devon, Isles of Scilly, Plymouth and Torbay	Conservative
Dorset Police	1974	Bournemouth, Christchurch and Poole and Dorset	Conservative
Durham Constabulary	1839	County Durham and Darlington	Labour
Essex Police	1840	Essex, Southend-on-Sea and Thurrock	Conservative
Gloucestershire Constabulary	1839	Gloucestershire (excluding South Gloucestershire)	Conservative
Greater Manchester Police	1974	Bolton, Rochdale, Manchester, Stockport, Tameside, Oldham, Wigan, and Trafford	No PCC, police responsible to Mayor of Greater Manchester
Hampshire and Isle of Wight Constabulary	1839	Portsmouth, Hampshire, Isle of Wight and Southampton	Conservative
Hertfordshire Constabulary	1841	Hertfordshire	Conservative
Humberside Police	1974	North East Lincolnshire, North Lincolnshire, Kingston upon Hull and East Riding of Yorkshire	Conservative
Kent Police	1857	Kent and Medway	Conservative
Lancashire Constabulary	1839	Blackburn with Darwen, Blackpool, and Lancashire	Conservative
Leicestershire Police	1839	Rutland, Leicester and Leicestershire	Conservative
Lincolnshire Police	1856	Lincolnshire (excluding North East Lincolnshire and North Lincolnshire)	Conservative
Merseyside Police	1974	Liverpool, St Helens, Wirral, Knowsley, and Sefton	Labour
Metropolitan Police	1829	Metropolitan Police District (Greater London excluding the City of London)	No PCC, police responsible to Mayor of London
Norfolk Constabulary	1839	Norfolk	Conservative
Northamptonshire Police	1966	North Northamptonshire and West Northamptonshire	Conservative
Northumbria Police	1974	City of Sunderland, Gateshead, Newcastle upon Tyne, South Tyneside, Northumberland and North Tyneside	Labour
North Yorkshire Police	1974	North Yorkshire (excluding Middlesbrough and Redcar and Cleveland) and York	Conservative
Nottinghamshire Police	1968	Nottingham and Nottinghamshire	Conservative
South Yorkshire Police	1974	Barnsley, Doncaster, Rotherham and Sheffield	Labour
Staffordshire Police	1968	Staffordshire and Stoke-on-Trent	Conservative
Suffolk Constabulary	1967	Suffolk	Conservative
Surrey Police	1851	Surrey	Conservative
Sussex Police	1968	Brighton and Hove, East Sussex and West Sussex	Conservative
Thames Valley Police	1968	Berkshire, Buckinghamshire, Oxfordshire, Milton Keynes and West Berkshire	Conservative
Warwickshire Police	1840	Warwickshire	Conservative
West Mercia Police	1967	Worcestershire, Herefordshire, Shropshire, and Telford and Wrekin	Conservative
West Midlands Police	1974	Birmingham, Solihull, Coventry, Wolverhampton, Dudley, Sandwell and Walsall	Labour
West Yorkshire Police	1974	Calderdale, City of Bradford, City of Wakefield, Kirklees and Leeds	No PCC, police responsible to Mayor of West Yorkshire
Wiltshire Police	1839	Swindon and Wiltshire	Conservative

==== Wales ====
- Dyfed-Powys Police
- Gwent Police
- North Wales Police
- South Wales Police

1. North Wales Police; 2. Dyfed-Powys Police; 3. South Wales Police; 4. Gwent Police

==== Proposed mergers for England and Wales ====
In 1981, James Anderton, Chief Constable of Greater Manchester Police, called for the number of forces to be reduced to nine in England (one for each Region) and one for Wales. A 2004 proposal by the Police Superintendents' Association for the creation of a single national police force, similar to Garda Síochána, was objected to by the Association of Chief Police Officers. The government did not accept the proposal at the time.

Administration of police matters is not generally affected by the Government of Wales Act 2006. From 2005 to 2006, the government considered merging several territorial police forces in England and Wales. The review only concerned policing outside of Scotland, Northern Ireland, and Greater London. Likewise, the major non-territorial forces (British Transport Police, Civil Nuclear Constabulary, Ministry of Defence Police) are responsible to other government departments, and would not have been affected either. The primary argument for merging forces is that forces with 4,000 or more officers would perform better and could save costs. The view was supported by HM Inspectorate of Constabulary, who said in September 2005 that the existing structure was "no longer working".

Merger proposals were announced by the Home Secretary in early 2006. They proposed reducing the number of police forces to less than 25, with Wales and several regions of England having one force each. The consultation period on this second batch of mergers started on 11 April 2006, and would have finished on 11 August, with a target of April 2008 for the mergers coming into effect.

On 20 June 2006, the then Home Secretary, John Reid, announced that the contested mergers would be delayed for further discussion. The only merger agreed to was with Lancashire Constabulary and Cumbria Constabulary. On 12 July 2006, the Home Office confirmed that all the mergers were to be abandoned, with the entire proposal taken back for consultation.

In 2026, Home Secretary Shabana Mahmood announced plans to reduce the number of police forces in England and Wales.

=== Scotland ===
In 2013, the 8 territorial police forces in Scotland were merged into a single Scottish police force, named "The Police Service of Scotland", or colloquially Police Scotland. Merging these forces had been first mooted in 2010, and was supported by the Scottish National Party, Scottish Labour Party and Scottish Conservative Party ahead of the 2011 Scottish Parliament election. After a consultation process, the Scottish Government confirmed on 8 September 2011 that a single police service would be created in Scotland. The Scottish Government stated that "reform will safeguard frontline policing in communities by creating designated local senior officers for every council area with a statutory duty to work with councils to shape local services. Establishing a single service aims to ensure more equal access to national and specialist services and expertise such as major investigation teams and firearms teams, whenever and wherever they are needed." The Police and Fire Reform (Scotland) Bill was published in January 2012 and was approved on 27 June 2012 after scrutiny in the Scottish Parliament. The Bill received royal assent as the Police and Fire Reform (Scotland) Act 2012. This created a force of approximately 17,000 police officers, the second largest in the United Kingdom after the Metropolitan Police in London.

In March 2015, following the transfer of police oversight powers to the Scottish Government, the Justice Secretary announced proposals to further unify policing in Scotland by merging the British Transport Police's operations north of the border with Police Scotland. This proposal was eventually dropped due to costs and the complexities of jurisdictions.

=== Cross-jurisdiction powers ===
Territorial police constables have certain powers of arrest in another one of the UK's three legal jurisdictions than they were attested in. There are four main provisions for them to do so: arrest with a warrant, arrest without a warrant for an offence committed in their home jurisdiction whilst in another jurisdiction, arrest without a warrant for an offence committed in another jurisdiction whilst in that jurisdiction, and mutual aid. A fifth power of cross-jurisdictional arrest was introduced by section 116 of the Policing and Crime Act 2017, which fills a loophole in arrest powers in certain situations. This power came into force in March 2018. This new power allows a constable from one jurisdiction to arrest without warrant a person suspected of an offence in another jurisdiction whilst in their home jurisdiction. This power is in relation to more serious offences as listed in the act. The Act sets out how long the person can be detained in custody by the "arresting force" in one jurisdiction until constables from the "investigating force" in another jurisdiction can travel to re-arrest the person and deal accordingly. Below is a summary of these five powers with a practical example due to the complicated nature of this area of law. Note: this section applies to territorial police constables only, and not to others, except the British Transport Police, who also have certain cross-border powers in addition to their natural powers.

==== Arrest with warrant ====
Certain warrants can be executed by constables even though they are outside their jurisdiction: arrest warrants and warrants of committal (all); and a warrant to arrest a witness (England, Wales or Northern Ireland); a warrant for committal, a warrant to imprison (or to apprehend and imprison), and a warrant to arrest a witness (Scotland). A warrant issued in one legal jurisdiction may be executed in either of the other two jurisdictions by a constable from either the jurisdiction where it was issued, or the jurisdiction where it is executed.

When executing a warrant issued in Scotland, the constable executing it shall have the same powers and duties, and the person arrested the same rights, as they would have had if execution had been in Scotland by a constable of a police force in Scotland. When executing a warrant issued in England and Wales or Northern Ireland, a constable may use reasonable force and has specified search powers provided by section 139 of the Criminal Justice and Public Order Act 1994.

==== Arrest without warrant: offences committed in home jurisdiction ====
In very simple terms, this power allows constables of one jurisdiction to travel to another jurisdiction and arrest a person they suspect of committing an offence in their home jurisdiction. For example, constables from Cumbria Police investigating an offence of assault that occurred in their police area could travel over the border into Scotland and arrest the suspect without a warrant found in Gretna.

If a constable suspects that a person has committed or attempted to commit an offence in their legal jurisdiction, and that person is now in another jurisdiction, the constable may arrest them in that other jurisdiction.

A constable from England and Wales is subject to the same necessity tests for arrest (as under section 24 of the Police and Criminal Evidence Act 1984) as they would be in England and Wales, a constable from Scotland may arrest if it would have been lawful to do so in Scotland and a constable from Northern Ireland is subject to the same necessity tests for arrest (as under Article 26 of the Police and Criminal Evidence (Northern Ireland) Order 1989.) as they would be in Northern Ireland.

A person arrested under the above powers:

- in Scotland, shall be taken to the nearest convenient designated police station or to a designated police station in a police area in which the offence is being investigated (England and Wales or Northern Ireland),
- in England or Wales, shall be taken to the nearest convenient police station (Scotland) or to a police station within a sheriffdom in which the offence is being investigated (Scotland), to the nearest convenient designated police station (Northern Ireland) or to a designated police station in which the offence is being investigated (Northern Ireland), or
- In Northern Ireland, shall be taken either to the nearest convenient designated police station (England and Wales) or to a designated police station in a police area in which the offence is being investigated (England and Wales) or to the nearest convenient police station (Scotland) or to a police station within a sheriffdom in which the offence is being investigated (Scotland).

==== Arrest without warrant: offences committed in other jurisdictions (known as reciprocal powers of arrest) ====
In simple terms, this power gives a constable of one jurisdiction, whilst in another jurisdiction the same power of arrest as a constable of the jurisdiction they are visiting. As a practical example, if constables from Police Scotland are over the border in Cumbria on enquiries and come across a burglary in progress, they can arrest the suspect on suspicion of burglary using the same arrest powers as a constable of England or Wales.

A constable from one legal jurisdiction has, in the other jurisdictions, the same powers of arrest as a constable of that jurisdiction would have.

A constable from England or Wales has:

- In Scotland, the same power of arrest as a constable from Scotland
- In Northern Ireland, the same power of arrest as a constable from Northern Ireland would have under Article 26 of the Police and Criminal Evidence (Northern Ireland) Order 1989 (necessity test).

A constable from Scotland has:

- In England and Wales, the same power of arrest as a constable from England or Wales would have under section 24 of the Police and Criminal Evidence Act 1984 (necessity test).
- in Northern Ireland, the same power of arrest as a constable from Northern Ireland would have under Article 26 of the Police and Criminal Evidence (Northern Ireland) Order 1989 (necessity test).

A constable from Northern Ireland has:

- In Scotland, the same power of arrest as a constable from Scotland
- In England and Wales, the same power of arrest as a constable from England or Wales would have under section 24 of the Police and Criminal Evidence Act 1984 (necessity test).

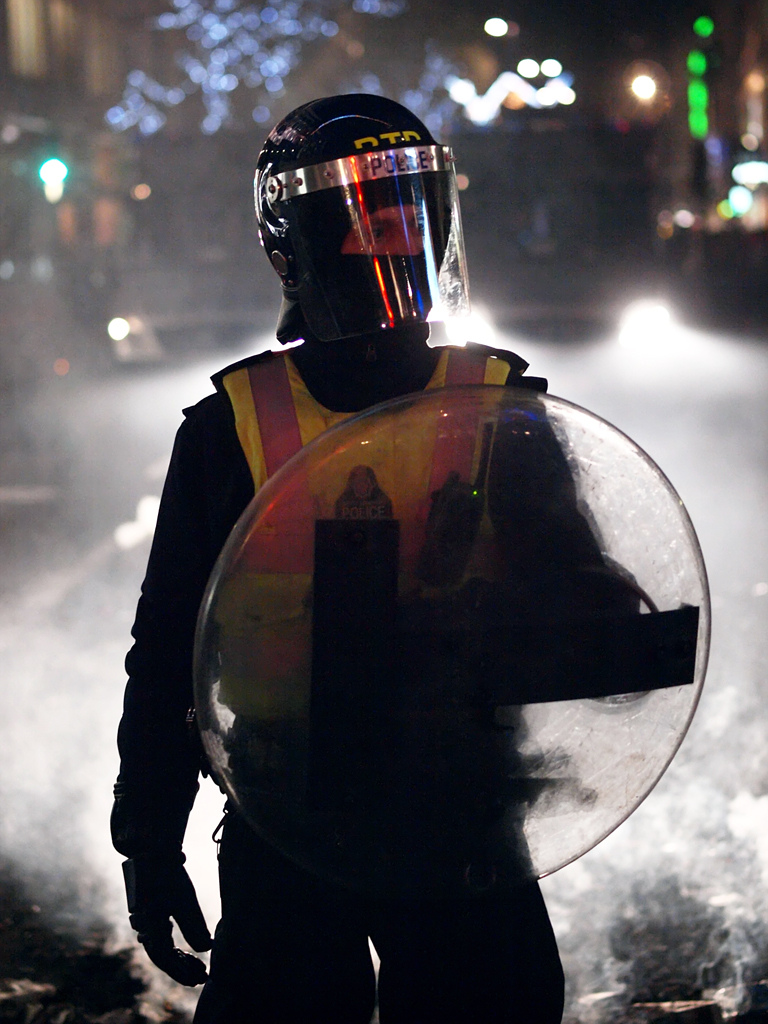
A British Transport Police public order officer on "mutual aid", supporting the Metropolitan Police

When a constable arrests a person in England and Wales, the constable is subject to the requirements of section 28 (informing of arrest), section 30 (taking to a designated police station) and section 32 (search on arrest). When a constable arrests a person in Scotland, the arrested person shall have the same rights and the constable the same powers and duties as they would have were the constable a constable of a police force in Scotland. When a constable arrests a person in Northern Ireland, the constable is subject to the requirements of Article 30 (informing of arrest), Article 32 (taking to a designated police station) and Article 34 (search on arrest).

==== Arrest without warrant by a constable in his home jurisdiction for an offence committed in another jurisdiction ====
This power allows a constable of one jurisdiction to arrest without warrant a person suspected of an offence in another jurisdiction whilst in their home jurisdiction. The Policing and Crime Act 2017 sets out which offences this power of arrest will apply to in each jurisdiction (generally serious offences), and how long the person arrested can be kept in custody, with relevant authorities, by the "arresting force" to allow sufficient time for officers from the "investigating force" in another jurisdiction to travel and re-arrest the detained person for their investigation.

This relatively new power came into force in March 2018. Until the introduction of this power, there was an issue whereby a constable in his home jurisdiction could not arrest a person suspected of an offence in another jurisdiction without a warrant.

==== Other situations (including Mutual Aid) ====
Police forces often support each other with large-scale operations, such as those that require specialist skills or expertise and those that require policing levels that the host forces cannot provide. Referred to as mutual aid, constables loaned from one force to another have the powers and privileges of a constable of the host force. Constables from the Metropolitan Police who are on protection duties in Scotland or Northern Ireland have all the powers and privileges of a constable of the host police force. A constable who is taking a person to or from a prison retains all the powers, authority, protection and privileges of his office regardless of his location. Regardless of where they are in the United Kingdom, a constable may arrest under section 41 and may stop and search under section 43 of the Terrorism Act 2000 on suspicion of terrorism (defined by section 40)

=== List of British Overseas Territories Police Forces ===
The fourteen British Overseas Territories are:

Flag	Arms	Name	Location	Force One	Force Two	Notes	Capital
		Akrotiri and Dhekelia	Cyprus, Mediterranean Sea	Sovereign Base Areas Police (SBA Police)		Civilian. Separate from, but administered by MOD	Episkopi Cantonment
		Anguilla	Caribbean, North Atlantic Ocean	Royal Anguilla Police Force (RAPF)		Civilian	The Valley
		Bermuda	North Atlantic Ocean between the Azores, the Caribbean, Cape Sable Island and Canada	Bermuda Police Service (BPS)	Airport Security Police (Bermuda)	BPS Includes Bermuda Reserve Police	Hamilton
		British Antarctic Territory	Antarctica	No official police force for the territory			Rothera (main base)
		British Indian Ocean Territory	Indian Ocean	Ten Royal Overseas Police Officers (ROPOs) (military)		Drawn from the three British Armed Forces' service police organisations (Royal Navy Police including Royal Marines Police, Royal Military Police and Royal Air Force Police)	Diego Garcia (base)
		British Virgin Islands	Caribbean, North Atlantic Ocean	Royal Virgin Islands Police Force (RVIPF)		Includes special constables and auxiliary constables	Road Town
		Cayman Islands	Caribbean	Royal Cayman Islands Police Service		Includes a Special Constabulary	George Town
		Falkland Islands	South Atlantic Ocean	Royal Falkland Islands Police	Joint Service Police & Security Unit (JSPSU) of British Forces Falkland Islands	JSPSU are sworn in as Royal Falkland Islands Police reserve constables and thus have civil as well as military policing powers on the islands	Stanley
		Gibraltar	Iberian Peninsula, Continental Europe	Royal Gibraltar Police (RGP)	Gibraltar Defence Police (GDP)	Plus His Majesty's Customs (Gibraltar) and Border and Coastguard Agency (Gibraltar)	Gibraltar
		Montserrat	Caribbean, North Atlantic Ocean	Royal Montserrat Police Service			Plymouth (abandoned due to volcano—de facto capital is Brades)
		Pitcairn, Henderson, Ducie and Oeno Islands	Pacific Ocean	Pitcairn Islands Police (two constables, one local & one UK)		See Law enforcement in the Pitcairn Islands	Adamstown
		Saint Helena, Ascension and Tristan da Cunha, including:	South Atlantic Ocean				Jamestown
		Saint Helena				|	
		Ascension Island					
		Tristan da Cunha		Royal Saint Helena Police Service			
		South Georgia and the South Sandwich Islands	South Atlantic Ocean	No [permanent] force			King Edward Point
		Turks and Caicos Islands	Lucayan Archipelago, North Atlantic Ocean	Royal Turks and Caicos Islands Police Force		Formed in 1799	Cockburn Town

==== List of forces for the Crown Dependencies ====
Name	Flag	Arms	Location	Title of Monarch	Forces	Notes	Capital
Bailiwick of Guernsey	Guernsey		English Channel	Duke of Normandy	States of Guernsey Police Service	Includes three distinct types of special constables	Saint Peter Port (capital of the whole Bailiwick and of Guernsey also)
Bailiwick of Guernsey	Alderney		English Channel	Duke of Normandy	States of Guernsey Police Service	Includes three distinct types of special constables	Saint Anne
Bailiwick of Guernsey	Sark		English Channel	Duke of Normandy	States of Guernsey Police Service	Includes three distinct types of special constables	The Seigneurie (de facto; Sark does not have a capital city)
Bailiwick of Jersey			English Channel	Duke of Normandy	States of Jersey Police Honorary Police (Jersey)	The Honorary Police are unpaid, elected officials of each parish	Saint Helier
Isle of Man			Irish Sea	Lord of Mann	Isle of Man Constabulary Isle of Man Airport Police (disbanded)		Douglas

=== Map ===
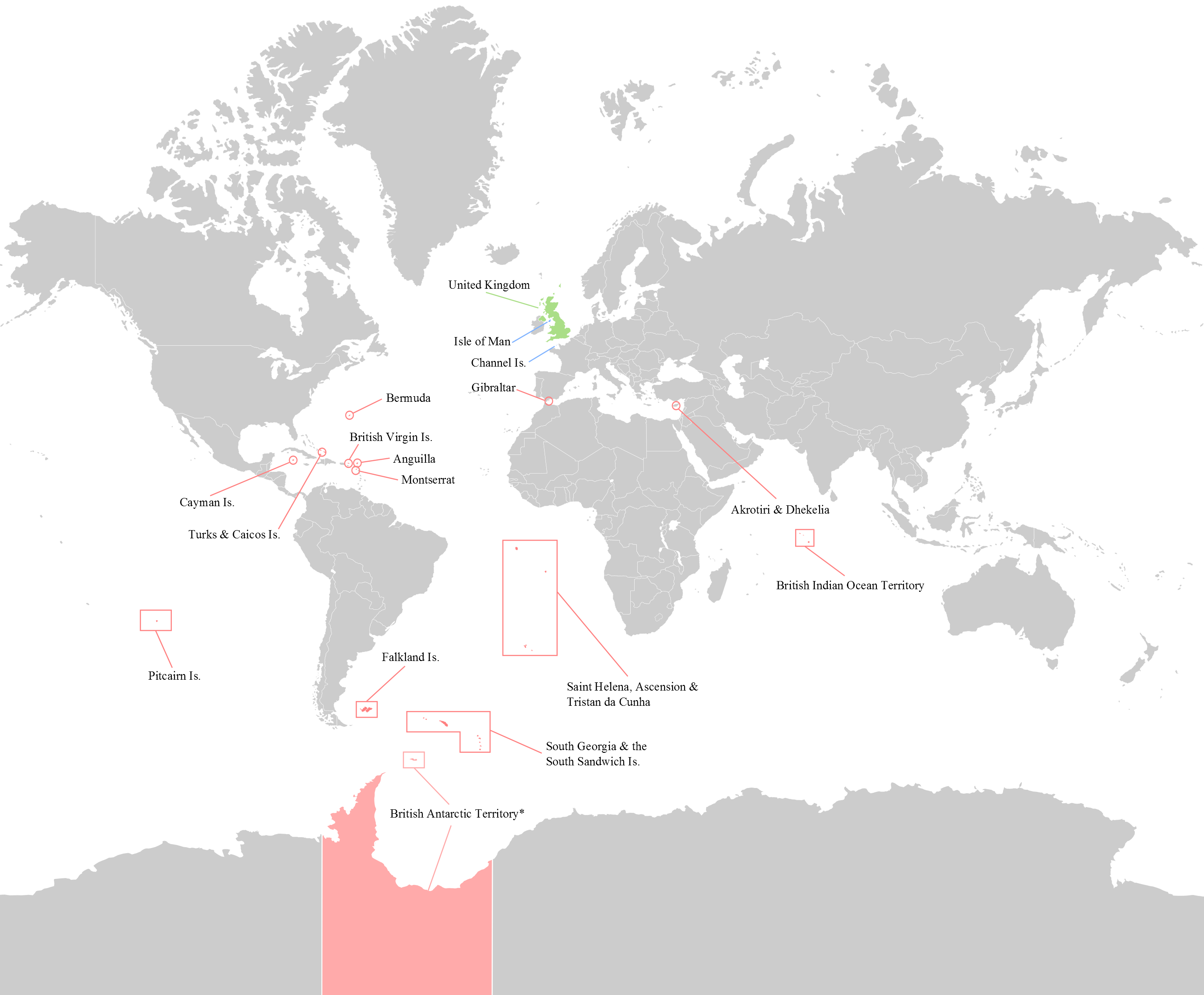
British Overseas Territories United Kingdom Crown Dependencies

== See also ==
=== Topics ===
- Police uniforms and equipment in the United Kingdom
- Police ranks of the United Kingdom
- Police aviation in the United Kingdom
- Police vehicles in the United Kingdom
- List of law enforcement agencies in the United Kingdom, Crown Dependencies and British Overseas Territories
- Police use of firearms in the United Kingdom
  - List of police firearms in the United Kingdom

=== Bodies ===
- Europol
- Forensic Science Service
- Interpol
- LGC Forensics – Laboratory of the Government Chemist
- National Black Police Association
- National Policing Improvement Agency

=== Databases ===
- Police National Computer
- Service Police Crime Bureau
- UK National DNA Database
- Violent and Sex Offender Register

=== Other articles ===
- List of British police officers killed in the line of duty
- List of killings by law enforcement officers in the United Kingdom
- List of United Kingdom uniformed services
- Panda car
- Police intelligence
- Scotland Yard
- Crime in the United Kingdom
- Crime statistics in the United Kingdom
- 61016 – BTP (British Transport Police) contact number for non-emergencies on public transport
