= Custody assistant =

A Custody Assistant is a non-warranted officer of a police force who assists police officers and custody officers in processing people who have been arrested and detained in a police custody suite. The custody assistant also has responsibilities relating to the care and welfare of the detained person.

== Role ==
The duties of a custody assistant (or known as a Detention Officer) commonly include:

- Searching, or assisting in searching arrested persons,
- Performing regular scheduled checks on detained persons in cells,
- Taking photographs, DNA samples and fingerprints of the detained person,
- Assisting custody officers with general admin and the running of the suite,
- Providing meals to those detained.

== Powers ==
In England & Wales, the chief police officer of a territorial police force may designate any person who is employed by the police authority maintaining that force, and is under the direction and control of that chief police officer, as a detention officer. They have a range of powers given by the Police Reform Act 2002, and their chief police officer decides which of these powers they may use.

In Scotland, Police Custody and Security Officers have powers similar to those of detention officers and escort officers in England and Wales. Similar powers are available in Northern Ireland.

== See also ==
- Custody suite
- Custody Sergeant
