= Waters v Comr of Police for the Metropolis =

Waters v Commissioner of Police of the Metropolis
- Court: House of Lords
- Decided: 27 July 2000
- Citations: [2000] 1 WLR 1607; [2000] UKHL 50; [2000] IRLR 720

Court membership
- Judges sitting: Lord Slynn of Hadley, Lord Jauncey of Tullichettle, Lord Clyde, Lord Hutton and Lord Millett

Keywords
- Discrimination

Waters v Commissioner of Police of the Metropolis [2000] UKHL 50 is a UK labour law case concerning victimisation for alleging rape, and whether the employee could claim this amounted to sex discrimination. The case concerned an incident in 1988 whereby Police Constable Eileen Waters stated she had been raped by another officer within Police hostel grounds. The landmark case went before five law lords in July 2000, who unanimously ruled that Eileen Waters' case should go ahead, therefore allowing her to sue the Metropolitan Police. In 2012 Waters won £270,000 in compensation from Scotland Yard for the claim, whereby the Crown Prosecution Service did not bring any charges after the failure of the earlier employment tribunal claim. At the time, it was one of the highest out-of-court settlements received by a police officer and reportedly reopened the public debate concerning the scale of compensation culture within the UK police force.

== Background ==
Police Constable Eileen Waters alleged she was raped in the police hostel for her work by a colleague in February 1988 when she was 19 years old, having been in the force for around one year.

Waters stated that this occurred when her colleague entered her Marylebone Road police hostel room above the station, under the pretext of not being able to get home that night. She made a report to her colleagues the next day at Harrow Road, stating that she had been raped.

The Independent reported that "The investigation into her allegations was treated as an internal affair by Scotland Yard's complaints investigation bureau. The officer concerned was not suspended and, after the Crown Prosecution Service decided that he should not face charges, was not disciplined." and that by August 1992 he was still a serving officer.

The London Evening Standard reported that following Waters' report to the force, she was subjected to "a horrific campaign of intimidation which led to a bloodstained truncheon being left in her locker."

== Judgments ==
=== Court of Appeal ===
Waite LJ dismissed PC Waters’ appeal.

The interpretation proposed by Mr Allen would involve an imprecision of language leaving employers in a state of uncertainty as to how they should respond to a particular complaint, and would place the machinery of the Acts at serious risk of abuse. It is better, and safer, to give the words of the subsection their clear and literal meaning... The facts alleged by the complaint in this case were incapable in law of amounting to an act of discrimination by the Commissioner because they were not done by him, and they cannot (because the alleged perpetrator was not acting in the course of his employment) be treated as done by him for the purposes of s 4(1).

This now falls under the Equality Act 2010 section 27.

=== Employment Tribunal ===
In August 1992 an Employment Tribunal ruled that the alleged rape was not actionable discrimination within the Sex Discrimination Act (SDA) 1975 stating that it "would not amount to a contravention of the Sex Discrimination Act".

=== House of Lords ===
In July 2000 the case was brought before the House of Lords. The House of Lords did not hear an appeal on the SDA 1975 definition of victimisation, but allowed an appeal in respect of negligence over the harassment, unfair treatment and victimisation after the rape complaint. Lord Hutton stated that if it were shown that psychiatric harm resulted from complaining about rape, "it is in the public interest that it should be brought to light so that steps can be taken to seek to ensure that it does not continue, because if officers… are treated as the plaintiff alleges, citizens will be discouraged from joining the police, or from continuing to serve in the police after they have joined, with consequent harm to the interests of the community."

== See also ==
- UK labour law
- UK employment equality law
