= Police custody and security officer =

Uniformed police staff role within Scotland

A Criminal Justice Police Custody and Security Officer (CJPCSO), formerly known as a Turnkey or PCSO (not to be confused with a police community support officer or a prisoner custody officer in England and Wales) is a uniformed non-warranted officer of Police Scotland who upholds current vetted employment with Scottish Police Authority and works in a police station within a police custody suite in some cases they can also work in productions, front counter in smaller more remote highland areas.

Primary roles of a CJPCSO are ensuring care, welfare, safety and security of the nominals admitted into their care. Proceeding with detaining and delivering their rights in accordance with the Criminal Justice (Scotland) Act 2016 and ensuring disposal in accordance with the Lord Advocate Guidelines whilst under the direct supervision of the custody sergeant for this process.

== Training and safety ==
This is a rather active and physical job especially in custody suites with high footfall and more experienced clients and despite having no entrance fitness test it requires strength and agility in order to protect the people in the officer's care from harming themself or others. Operational safety training is provided along with personal protective equipment such as stab-proof and basic ballistics proof vest, handcuffs, leg restraints, and personal protective weapons such as Baton and PAVA Incapacitant Spray.

== Risks ==
Police Scotland supports officers in reporting assaults including verbal threats or hate crime related abuse to seek maximum punishment.

The following is not exhaustive of the risks that could be presented to a CJPCSO however some of these are assessed as ultimate risk or injuries following incidents.

- stab wounds / gun shot wounds resulting in minor to severe blood loss or pneumothorax.
- physical injury from assault resulting in broken bones, head injury, limb and joint damage, internal bleeding and bruising and permanent disfigurement.
- psychiatric ailments such as
  - PTSD
  - Depression
- Entrapment of fingers within cell door on closure or degloving of skin surrounding finger.

Personal protective equipment and weapons are provided subsequent to appropriate training and are only used as a last resort in accordance with police Scotland's use of force policy. Other security and safety measures are unique to each environment. Officers are watched 24/7 by CCTV and have the ability to summon help in a violent situation.

== Powers ==
Officers have powers to

- transfer people in custody from any court, prison, police station or mental hospital to another
- have custody of persons held in legal custody on court premises (whether or not such persons would otherwise be in the custody of the court) and to produce them before the court
- have custody of persons temporarily held in legal custody in relevant premises (any court, prison, police station or hospital) while in the course of transfer from one set of such premises to another
- apprehend people who have escaped from any court, prison, police station or hospital or whilst being transferred between those places
- remove from relevant premises any person—
  - who they have reasonable grounds to believe has committed or is committing an offence, or
  - who is causing a disturbance or nuisance
- search any person who is in custody or is unlawfully at large, anywhere
- in relevant premises, or in any other place in which a person in his custody who is being transferred from one set of relevant premises to another is present, to search (any or all)—
  - property;
  - any person who he has reasonable grounds to believe has committed or is committing an offence;
  - any person who is seeking access to a person in the officer's custody or to relevant premises;
- in relevant premises, or in any other place in which a person in legal custody is or may be, to require any person who he has reasonable grounds for suspecting has committed or is committing an offence to give his name and address and either—
  - to remain there with the officer until the arrival of a constable; or
  - where reasonable in all the circumstances, to go with the officer to the nearest police station, but only if before imposing any such requirement on a person the officer informs him of the nature of the suspected offence and of the reason for the requirement
- at a constable's direction, photograph, or take relevant physical data from, any person held in custody
- to use reasonable force (which may include the use of handcuffs and other means of restraint) where necessary in exercising the above powers

== Additional duties ==
They also have duties to

- attend to the well-being of persons in their custody
- prevent the escape of such persons from their custody
- prevent, or detect and report on, the commission or attempted commission by such persons of other unlawful acts
- act with a view to preserving good order in the premises of any court and in land connected with such premises
- ensure good order and discipline on the part of such persons (whether or not in the premises of any court or in land connected with such premises)
  - in fulfilment of this duty, apprehend any person and to detain that person in custody in the premises of the court in question;
- give effect to any order of a court.

It is an offence to Assault, Resist or interfere with a Criminal Justice Police Custody and Security Officer (as it is the same for a police officer) in the exercise of their duty when appointed the duty by the chief constable of Scotland as detailed on their authorisation card.

== Line management structure ==
A CJPCSO is answerable to their line manager, a CJPCSO Team Leader (TL) who holds the same duties as listed as a CJPCSO, butr completes various other managerial and supervisory duties such as employee attendance and other basic HR related enquiries as a first line manager.

The CJPCSO(TL) works alongside the custody sergeant in sync.

The team leader manages and risk assesses care and welfare for nominals as well as being a line manager for the staff on duty.

The Custody sergeant is responsible for the legal and lawful aspect of business conduct ensuring it is necessary and proportional in order to keep people detained in police custody only for the time necessary.
