= Firearms unit =

Armed police unit in the UK

A firearms unit is an armed unit within each territorial police force in the United Kingdom. For the most part, the police forces of the United Kingdom are unarmed; however, all have firearms units to provide the police force with the capability to deal with armed criminals. A police officer cannot apply to join the firearms unit without first finishing their two-year probationary period, with a further two years in a core policing role for some forces. Firearms unit is the most common name outside of the capital, while that of London's Metropolitan Police Service is called the Specialist Firearms Command, Trojan, or MO19. Within the media, it is sometimes compared to the SWAT units of the United States.

The number of firearms legally available to criminals is low due to the United Kingdom's gun laws requiring licensing and background checks to legally acquire and possess most types of firearms. In the majority of cases, the presence of an armed officer can often be enough to negotiate the surrender of an armed criminal. The number of times a police firearm is deliberately discharged at suspects in England and Wales is usually less than 10 occasions per year; since 2009, the highest number was 13 occasions during the April 2018-March 2019 financial year.

Only three services in the United Kingdom routinely arm officers due to the nature of their work; the Ministry of Defence Police which polices MOD property, the Civil Nuclear Constabulary which polices civil nuclear facilities, and the Police Service of Northern Ireland due to the paramilitary threat.

On 13 January 2016, following the November 2015 Paris attacks it was decided to significantly increase the numbers of armed officers in London. The then Commissioner of the London Metropolitan Police, Sir Bernard Hogan-Howe has decided that he will double the number of armed officers and promised a 'significant' further announcement.

== Organisation, history, training and tactics ==
=== History ===
Police use of firearms has been a slow and controversial process, usually due to resistance from senior officers regarding firearms and adverse reactions from the public. During the Second World War, firearms were only carried on protection duties, such as guarding Downing Street, Buckingham Palace and locations at risk from enemy sabotage. However, the police were supplied with many firearms such as the Canadian Ross Rifle and P14 Enfield as part of the anti-invasion preparations of World War II. Due to equipment shortages, firearms issued to the police were often in poor condition and sometimes lacked a holster to accommodate the weapon, leading to them being concealed in the uniform tunic or tucked in the waistline of the trouser. In the years following the Second World War, training for the standard-issue Webley & Scott revolver consisted of firing six shots, to pass, it was required that three shots be on target. Loading, unloading and safe handling of the weapon was not usually taught. During the same period, the police had an increased number of ex-servicemen joining the ranks, and their previous knowledge was treated to suffice leading to them being issued with firearms without police training, in an emergency. An example of this, was when the police mounted a large-scale search following the Shepherd's Bush murders, firearms were issued to any officer who had previous experience of their use, such as officers that attended shooting clubs or ex-members of the armed forces.

The Metropolitan Police was formed on 29 September 1829, with the passing of the Metropolitan Police Act. The officers of the 'new police' were unarmed to counter fears of a paramilitary organisation. Despite this, Home Secretary Sir Robert Peel gave the commissioner authorisation to purchase fifty flintlock pocket pistols for use in exceptional circumstances. As time progressed, the flintlocks were decommissioned, being superseded by early revolvers. During the 1880s, burglary (or "house breaking" as it was then called) was a common problem for police. "House breakers" often carried firearms, due to the law of the day permitting members of the public to own firearms. After a series of fatal shootings of officers on the outer divisions of the Metropolis, and after much press coverage debating whether the service should be routinely armed, the commissioner applied to the Home Secretary for authorisation to allow officers on the outer districts to carry a revolver if they wished to at night. A revolver could only be issued if, in the opinion of the senior officer, the officer could be trusted to use it safely and with discretion. From then on, all officers who felt the need to be armed, could be so. The practice lasted until 1936, although the vast majority of the system was phased out by the end of the 19th century.

During the late 19th century, revolvers were issued to divisional police stations. The number of revolvers stored at the station depended on its size, and geographical location. In the Metropolitan Police the issue of firearms to stations was standardised with; ten pistols with 320 rounds of ammunition issued to divisional stations, six pistols with 192 rounds per sub-divisional station, and three pistols with 96 rounds to each section station. The firearms were kept in a locked box, with rules of their use attached to the front of it. The key to the box was held by a senior officer, whose permission had to be sought before the box could be opened. Rules of their use dictated that if the revolvers were to be issued, the names of the officers who they were allocated to be recorded, and they be checked of their condition and loaded by the section sergeant when the officers paraded for duty.

In 1948, concerns were aired by the Home Office over the civil police's role if there were to be another war, invasion or the newly posed threat of nuclear attack. The government dictated that the role of the police would still be to maintain law and order, even in times of emergency. However, despite the police not being a combatant force, in the event of war they were to have an offensive capability assisting the Armed Forces. It was decided that to be successful in this role, the police needed to be issued firearms. The Ministry of Defence loaned Sten submachine guns, along with a number of Lee–Enfield No4 bolt-action rifles. These, along with Webley & Scott revolvers and ammunition were kept in secret depots around the United Kingdom, with the locations known by senior officers, so each force had access to them if required.

Before the 1970s, rules regarding operational use of firearms dictated that they were to be worn in a holster on the duty belt, concealing the weapon until drawn. The rule was revised when armed police officers began to carry firearms other than pistols, the size of which meant they could not be concealed. The first instance of this was when armed airport officers of the Metropolitan Police Aviation Security OCU were issued with the newly sanctioned Heckler & Koch MP5 semi-automatic carbine.

Before a major reconstruction of the rules regarding operational use of firearms, high-ranking officers such as chief inspectors or superintendents could authorise firearms officers to draw weapons from an Armed Response Vehicle (ARV), in the event of an "immediate threat to life". In a less threatening situation, authorisation had to be gained from an on-call senior officer of the Association of Chief Police Officers. The difficulty of this authorisation was realised, as desired officers were not always available. The decision to draw firearms from the secure cabinet in the rear of the ARV now rests upon the individual judgement of the firearms officer, with personal side arms being carried on each member as a matter of routine. For planned operations, a designated senior officer can authorise the deployment of carbines. Intervention from specialist firearms officers requires authorisation from the Home Office before the chief constable of the force can deploy them.

Before the creation of authorised firearms officer and specialist firearms officer roles, each large police station had a small number of "authorised shots" (as they were then called). trained in the use of firearms. Until needed, the "authorised shots" carried out routine policing duties. After the formation of firearms units, all trained officers in each force were brought together under one unit, with a structured training programme headed by senior officers. The concept of Armed Response Vehicles were not introduced until 1991, being first transitioned in London.

Within London's Metropolitan Police, "authorised shots" were not completely phased out after the creation of AFO and SFO. Within London, sieges involving a terrorist objective or required specialist entry was dealt with by D11. Whereas, all other siege situations involving an armed, barricaded criminal were dealt with by borough "divisional riflemen", supervised by a senior officer doubling as instructor from D11.

The Metropolitan Police firearms unit has had a series of name changes, due to continuous changes in departmental units. When first formed in 1966, it was named D6, before being changed to D11. After that it was changed to PT17 under Personnel and Training, when the Specialist Operations designation was introduced it was changed to SO19. Upon "SO" being phased out in 2005, its designation was replaced by Central Operations. The firearms unit's present name is Specialist Firearms Command, with its designation being SCO19.

Since 2005, the police have been equipped and authorised to employ the use of the Heckler & Koch L104A1 "baton gun", which fires an attenuating energy projectile. The "baton gun" is authorised for use in situations where an offender needs to be incapacitated, without resorting to the use of conventional firearms. Armed officers also have access to the discriminating irritant projectile, which is designed to deliver a cloud of irritant in the direction of an aggressive offender.

During July 2007, the Home Office announced plans to supply police forces in England & Wales with tasers as a Less-lethal option. Tasers are authorised for use in situations where an offender needs to be incapacitated, but without resorting to the use of conventional firearms. Tasers are authorised for use by Authorised and specialist firearms officers, along with other units who are not routinely armed such as public order Police Support Units. Following a 12-month trial period in 2004, tasers became authorised on a full-time basis.

=== Organisation ===
Firearms units in large forces are headed by a chief superintendent, superintendent, four chief inspectors, three inspectors and six sergeants, with up to fifty to sixty constables. In certain smaller forces, the firearms unit is headed by a superintendent, four chief inspectors, two inspectors, four sergeants, with forty to fifty constables.

Firearms units maintain a number of tactical advisors to aid senior officers in decision making during major incidents, and to provide a planning capability for planned firearms operations and VIP protection. The main responsibilities of firearms units in the UK are the response to emergency calls believed to involve firearms, and the arrest of armed, dangerous or barricaded criminals in official raids and operations. Specialist firearms officers receive enhanced training in dynamic entry tactics, for hostage rescue.

Each police force operates an Armed Response Vehicle system, crewed by authorised firearms officers. ARVs were introduced into the British police in the early 1990s, to provide them with the capability to respond to firearms incidents. ARVs constantly patrol a geographical area, reducing deployment time. Most forces have purchased Volvo V70s for ARV duties, although the Metropolitan Police Service employs standard BMW area cars, adapted for specialist duty usage.

The new 'standard' vehicle for ARV use, as of 2012, favored by most forces and soon to be adopted by the MET police is the BMW X5.

Many forces operate Road Policing Units, solely responsible for maintaining the traffic flow on UK motorways and A roads. Instead of creating both an ARV and an RPU, certain forces have merged them together creating "Traffic ARVs" which carry out normal road policing duties, until required for firearms incidents.

Within London's Metropolitan Police, Armed Response Vehicles are crewed by three authorised firearms officers. Each AFO has a specified task - an advanced driver, a navigator and an observer who is responsible for scene assessment and liaison with other services. ARVs outside of the capital are crewed by two officers, with the observer assuming the role of navigator. Some forces have reserved a radio call sign for ARVs, such as "trojan" to make them easier to identify when using radios. ARVs in most forces are identified by a circular yellow sticker on the body of the vehicle, and some have "ARV" printed on the vehicle.

Metropolitan Police firearms officers usually patrol on-foot more often than those outside London, due to the large geographic area the Metropolitan Police are responsible for and the number of sensitive government buildings in need of armed security. They can also be found at major demonstrations, and large social events such as the Chinese New Year. Diplomatic Protection Group officers are routinely armed as they are responsible for guarding government buildings classed as "high risk", such as foreign embassies, Downing Street, along with Westminster and Buckingham Palace.

If a police forces geographical area includes an airport, armed officers would be assigned to the airport to assist in security. The Metropolitan Police's Aviation Security Operational Command Unit polices London Heathrow Airport, Sussex Police are responsible for Gatwick Airport, and Essex Police are responsible for Stansted Airport.

In some forces major crime or specialist operational units have firearms capacities. The Metropolitan Police Service has the flying squad, which is a group of specialist firearms officers used operationally to tackle organised crime groups and armed gangs.

=== Training ===
Before a police officer can apply to join the firearms unit, they are required to have completed their two-year probationary period. After being screened for security clearance and undergoing various interviews, they are invited to attend the National Police Firearms Training Centre at Gravesend, Kent. At the centre, the potential AFOs undergo one week of intensive training on the Glock 17 pistol, Heckler & Koch MP5 semi automatic carbine, Heckler & Koch L104A1 baton gun and the X2 Taser. This is followed by training on the legal regulations regarding the police use of firearms and rules of engagement, a further six weeks of training is focused solely on ARVs, with an emphasis on driving techniques, high speed pursuit methods and safely executing controlled crashes.

Authorized Firearms Officers applying to become specialist firearms officers, are required to attend an eight-week training course at the National Police Firearms Training Centre. The main role of an SFO is to intervene in situations that are beyond the control of AFOs, such as building sieges involving a hostage situation. Potential SFOs are extensively trained in the use of specialist firearms, method of entry techniques and abseiling 'fast rope' skills. Potential SFOs are also trained in safe entry into air and watercraft. Training also includes the use of tear gas and stun grenades, safe handling of hostages and rescue techniques, computer simulated 'war games' of potential threats such as a major evacuation or terrorist attack, and training in the use of protective clothing against CBRN attack.

The guidelines regarding operational use of firearms and rules of engagement are dictated by the Association of Chief Police Officers, making sure that the rules outlined are compliant with the European Convention of Human Rights and the Police and Criminal Evidence Act 1984. Firearms officers are authorized to fire upon a suspect if they pose an "immediate threat to life", such as if an armed offender brandished a firearm at a member of the public or police officer. They may also fire if an offender is clearly in possession of a firearm, or is suspected to be carrying one. In all situations, a clear oral warning must be given of the officer's intention to use firearms, unless in a particular situation where it would be pointless or place life at risk. Firearms officers are also authorized to use their firearms for the humane destruction of animals, if the latter pose a significant threat. Firearms officers are not required to give an oral warning if they are approaching someone who is believed to be intent on committing a suicide bombing. All officers are trained to fire once at the central mass in order to incapacitate a threat, then to re-assess the situation and the threat posed to justify any further shots. However, if Operation Kratos contingency plans are activated, an armed officer may shoot at the target's head, to kill, as a standard incapacitating shot risks detonating a bomb attached to the person. In all situations, the officer is to make the decision when to shoot. However, they are accountable in court and are asked to justify their actions in a court of law.

=== Tactics ===
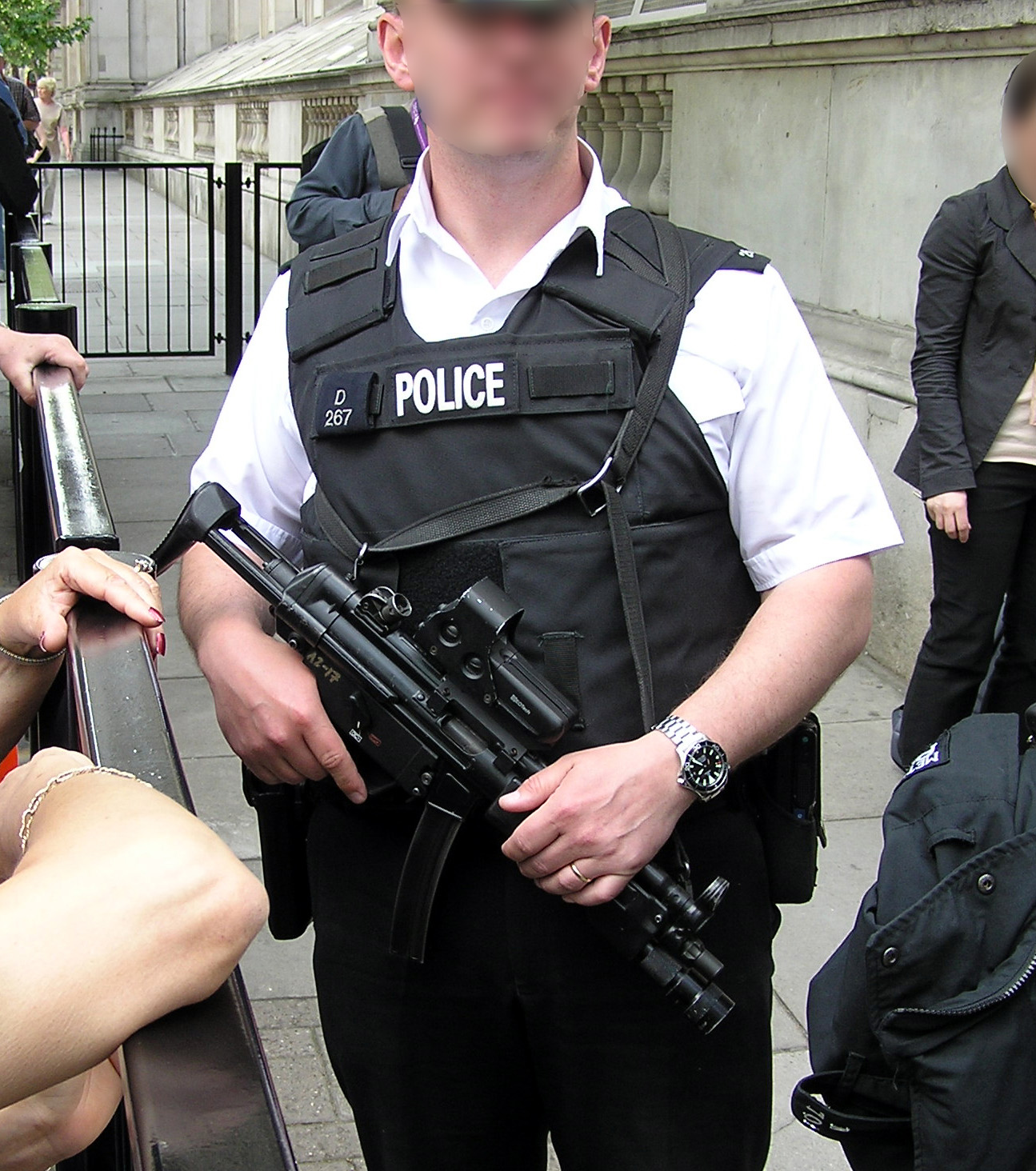
A Metropolitan police officer attached to the DPG guards an entrance to Downing Street, London, home of the Prime Minister.

Upon an emergency call being received about an incident involving firearms, an Armed Response Vehicle crewed by AFOs would be dispatched. The AFOs first on scene would attempt to contain an armed subject if they are inside a building, whereas if they were in the open where an immediate threat is posed a quicker solution would be sought. If a subject is inside a building which is barricaded, AFOs would most likely assault the building as long as it does not require specialist entry or the motive of the subject is terrorist affiliated. If the building required specialist entry or a terrorist gain, specialist firearms officers would attempt to assault the building. Pending authorisation from the Home Office to deploy SFOs, ARV officers would organise an inner and outer cordon. The inner being made up of armed officers, and the outer of unarmed to prevent members of the public gaining entry and prevent traffic entering the affected area. Efforts would be made to evacuate people in the immediate vicinity so that they are not at risk of stray gunfire, or confine them to their homes for their own safety. A control room would be established where emergency services can liaise and plan the operation, along with a mobile canteen nearby. The police would employ the Gold Silver Bronze command structure, with a Gold Commander being a senior officer overseeing events from a nearby police station, the Silver Commander who would oversee events from the on-scene control room, and the Bronze Commander who would be as close to the incident as possible.

In the preliminary stages of a siege or hostage situation, an observation point is allocated and assigned a marksman. A deliberate action plan would be devised, briefing each member of the assault team on the entry points, and details of the assault. Negotiations are made allowing the hostage takers to issue demands, which are usually done to acquire time and avoid harm to the hostages. The negotiations would be attended by a psychological profiler to assess the hostage takers state of mind, such as whether they have been forced into the situation through avoiding arrest or have a wider objective.

If negotiations deteriorate to a point where hostages are placed at risk of immediate death or injury, an assault by SFOs may be authorised. In a minority of cases, the police may hand over responsibility to the British Army Special Forces.

The structure of police assault teams vary, but the most commonly deployed are:

- "Shield officer" - carrying a ballistic shield to cover the team from being fired upon.
- "Baton officer" - carrying a baton (as well as a firearm) to engage any unarmed offenders.
- Method of entry specialist - responsible for opening barricaded doors, usually armed with a Remington shotgun.
- "Cover officer" - responsible for protecting the other members of the team as they carry out their functions.
- "Prisoner reception officer" - responsible for handling prisoners.
- A team leader and a police dog may enter.

Such an assault may be preceded by "ferret" CS gas canisters fired into the property, to concuss and soften resistance.

Following an assault firearms officers have made the premises safe, by clearing it out of offenders and making both police and offenders weapons safe. Scenes of Crime Officers will forensically seal both police and other weapons for examination to discover if either have been discharged, and to be used as evidence in court.

== Legal status of the use of firearms ==
The usage of firearms by the police is covered by statute (such as the Police and Criminal Evidence Act 1984 and Human Rights Act 1998), policy (such as the Home Office Code of Practice on Police use of Firearms and Less Lethal Weapons and the ACPO Manual of Guidance on Police Use of Firearms) and common law.

AFOs may only carry firearms when authorized by an "appropriate authorising officer". The appropriate authorizing officer must be of the rank of inspector or higher. When working at airports, nuclear sites, on Protection Duties and deployed in Armed Response Vehicles in certain areas, 'Standing Authority' is granted to carry personal sidearms. All members of the Police Service of Northern Ireland have authority to carry a personal issue handgun as a matter of routine, and may carry it whilst off duty. In all forces, usage of other weapons such as semi-automatic carbines requires further training and authorisation. Semi-automatic carbines are stored in a locked armoury which is situated in the boot of an Armed Response Vehicle. Equipping of semi-automatic carbines rests on a judgment of the AFO.

United Kingdom law allows the use of "reasonable force" in order to make an arrest or prevent a crime or to defend one's self. However, if the force used is fatal, then the European Convention of Human Rights only allows "the use of force which is no more than absolutely necessary". Firearms officers may therefore only discharge their weapons "to stop an imminent threat to life".

ACPO policy states that "use" of a firearm includes both pointing it at a person and discharging it (whether accidentally, negligently or on purpose). As with all use of force in England and Wales, the onus is on the individual officer to justify their actions in court.

== Firearms intelligence unit ==
Certain police forces that have high gun crime rates have set up an FIU to gather intelligence on gun crime, or certain parts of the community it may affect. Possibly one of the most notable FIUs is the Metropolitan Police's Operation Trident & Trafalgar, which initially only investigated gun crime involving the black community but has since expanded to investigate all shootings. FIU also works to identify criminals who are known to have access to firearms.

== Types of firearms officer ==
- Authorised firearms officers are trained in the use of the standard-issue firearms of his or her police force as well as battlefield medicine, which includes the treatment of gunshot wounds. They also crew Armed Response Vehicles. AFOs form the majority of police firearms officers.
- Specialist firearms officers are qualified as an AFO, with extra training within a specific area, such as specialist weapons, Close Protection, Tactical Medicine, Tactics Advice, Advanced Police Driving or Police Firearms Instruction, and are commonly the firearms officers to assault a building in a hostage situation. SFO's no longer exist in London being instead replaced by CTSFO's.
- Counter terrorist specialist firearms officers are elite officers based in several areas of the UK, where terrorist attacks are most likely. Trained in explosive method of entry (EMOE) and tactical insertions from helicopters to name a few new tactics they use.
- Tactical rifle officers are specialist police marksmen used during operational deployments such as at the 2012 Olympic games or during situational deployments such as during a siege.
- Principal protection officers (PPO) are the officers in charge of protection teams. These protection officers were made better known by the BBC television series Bodyguard.

== Firearms and equipment ==
Firearms and equipment in service vary between forces, due to individual police authorities' and chief officers' independence in deciding equipment for their service.

Despite being armed, AFOs carry the standard-issue telescopic or rigid baton, CS/PAVA incapacitant spray, and Speedcuffs on the duty belt. Instead of wearing the standard-issue stab vest, AFOs and SFOs wear a ballistic vest which affords greater protection from gun shots. Instead of carrying one TETRA radio like that of an unarmed officer, AFOs carry two, with one being for the service frequency and the other to communicate solely with other firearms officers on the same duties. The radios are specially adapted so that the officer is not forced to release the grip on the firearm. SFOs would be more likely to wear fire retardant coveralls with webbing including "belt order" kit.

During the early 1990s, most services adopted white dress shirts for officers, rather than the previous light blue. In most services, AFOs wear a black polo style shirt with standard black trousers. AFOs and SFOs often wear a PASGT style ballistic helmet, rather than a peaked cap or custodian helmet.

Firearms issued to the police are adapted so that they can only fire semi-automatic.

== Alternative names for firearms units ==
- Devon and Cornwall Constabulary: Tactical Aid Group
- Metropolitan Police Service: Specialist Firearms Command (known as SCO19, after the CO designation, now MO19 Internally, previously within SO). Furthermore, the Road Transport Policing Command, Specialist Protection, Counter Terrorism Command and Surveillance unit all have firearms officers in their ranks.
- Kent Police: Training and Tactical Firearms Unit
- City of London Police: Tactical Firearms Group
- Wiltshire Police: Armed Response Group
- Northumbria Police: Firearms Support Unit, based at Follingsby Park.
- Greater Manchester Police: Tactical Firearms Unit
- Police Scotland: Strategic Firearms Unit, with ARVs deployed in all divisions.
- Merseyside Police: Matrix: Armed Policing, based at the Matrix OCC in Liverpool.
- South Yorkshire Police: Firearms Support Group
- West Midlands Police: Firearms Operations Unit [FOU] - encompassing both the ARV Team, and the Tactical Firearms Team.

== Firearms units outside the UK ==
Specialist police firearm units are present in foreign Law enforcement agencies in which firearms are routinely carried by officers. These units are provided with increased firepower, more equipment and training than regular officers. Foreign firearms units are not intended to deal with routine firearms incidents, as they are attended to by officers who routinely carry firearms. Such units are normally only called upon when firearms incidents are of such a nature, that they require specialist intervention whereas the firearms units within the United Kingdom respond to all firearms related incidents, as UK police (with the exception of Northern Ireland) are not routinely armed. The New Zealand Police had a similar policy to the UK of no routine carriage of firearms by officers and established Armed Offenders Squads around their country to respond to firearms incidents. However, New Zealand police officers whilst still not carrying firearms are now being provided with ready access and training that is diminishing the role of the Squads. Examples of tactical units include Ireland's Garda Emergency Response Unit and Australian Police Tactical Groups. The United States has tactical units referred to commonly as Special Weapons and Tactics (SWAT) units.

== See also ==
- Police use of firearms in the United Kingdom
