= Police uniforms and equipment in the United Kingdom =

Police uniforms and equipment in the United Kingdom vary enormously per force or service, and different uniforms and equipment is used for different situations. Both what is worn and what is carried have varied considerably from the inception of the earliest recognisable mainstream police services in the early 19th century. As various laws in the mid-19th century standardised policing in the United Kingdom, so too were uniforms and equipment. From a variety of home grown uniforms, bicycles, swords and pistols the British police force evolved in look and equipment through the long coats and top hat, to the recognisable modern uniform of a white shirt, black tie, reflective jackets, body armour, and the battenburg-marked vehicles, to the present-day Airwave Solutions radios, electric vehicles and tasers.

The lists of police uniforms and equipment here are not exhaustive, nor specific for each force, but give a general overview of typical "kit" used in the United Kingdom.

== Equipment ==
Various items of equipment are usually carried on the duty belt of uniformed officers, although some have pouches attached to their stab vest, eliminating the need for a belt. Plainclothes officers may wear a harness, which can be worn under clothes. They usually have:

- baton (extendable/collapsible)
- personal radio
- CS/PAVA incapacitant spray
- Police notebook (some forces now use electronic notebooks on their police-issued smart phone)
- Pens
- Smartphones (for accessing the PNC, issuing tickets and taking statements)
- Torch
- Bodycam with audio
- Leg restraints
- Rigid cuffs (handcuffs)
- Taser (specially trained officers, but becoming routinely issued in a few forces)

Extra equipment, such as a first aid kit (including a pocket mask, disposable gloves, germicidal wipes, hypoallergenic tape, wound dressings, a triangular bandage, and sterile plasters), may be stored in a patrol car.

== Uniform ==
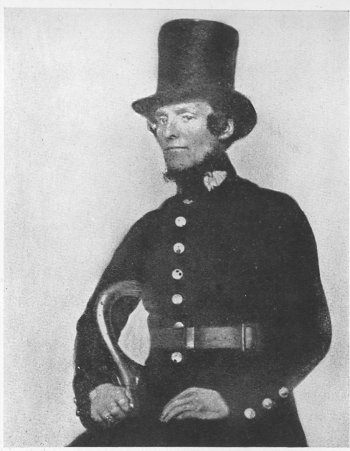
An 1850s Metropolitan Police "Peeler"

For much of the twentieth century up to the mid-1990s, male police officers wore a dark blue (almost black) tunic with polished silver buttons (gold for the City of London Police), and trousers of matching colour with a sewn-in truncheon pocket. No stab vest was worn and much less equipment was carried than is today. Following concerns about police officers' safety, it was suggested that the uniform should be changed.

From the 1990s, it was generally accepted that the police could patrol in "shirt-sleeve order" which meant that they need not wear the jacket, as its widespread use was an impediment in some situations. In 1994, the Home Office, with the co-operation of many chief constables, changed the uniform to black trousers, shirt, blue NATO-style V-neck jumper, stab vest (typically with pockets, pouches and other compartments), service belt (duty belt) and reflective jacket.

Although there are minor variations in the styling, pattern and insignia, the police forces of Great Britain, Jersey, Guernsey, the Isle of Man and Gibraltar all wear very similar uniforms. In general, these have taken their lead from the Metropolitan Police Service, due to it being recognised as the first Home Office police service in England. The base colour is a very dark blue, almost indistinguishable from black (and recently often is black), which earned the police the nickname of the "boys in blue".

=== Uniform history ===
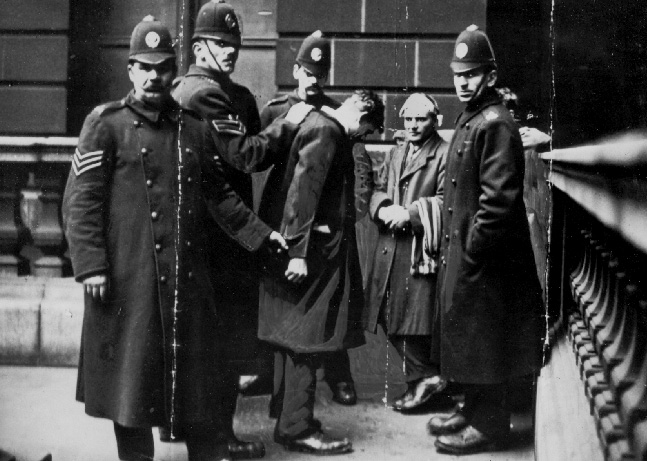
Greatcoated British police officers of 1919.

The Metropolitan Police officers were unarmed to clearly distinguish them from military enforcers, which had been the system of policing seen before the 1820s. Their uniform was also styled in blue, rather than the military red. Despite the service being unarmed, the then Home Secretary, Robert Peel, gave authorisation to the Commissioner to purchase fifty flintlock pistols, for exceptional incidents that required the use of firearms. As time progressed, the obsolete flintlocks were replaced by early revolvers. At the time, burglary (or "house breaking" as it was then called) was a common problem for police, as house breakers were usually armed. Due to the deaths of officers at the hands of armed criminals in the outer districts of the Metropolis, and after much press coverage debating whether Peel's service should be fully armed, the Commissioner applied to the Home Secretary to supply all officers on the outer districts with revolvers. These could be issued only if, in the opinion of the senior officer, the officer could be trusted to use it safely, and with discretion. From that point, officers who felt the need to be armed, could be so. The practice lasted until 1936, although the vast majority of the system was phased out by the end of the 19th century.

From 1829, to 1839, Metropolitan Police officers wore blue swallowtail coats with high collars to counter garroting. This was worn with white trousers in summer, and a cane-reinforced top hat, which could be used as a step to climb or see over walls. In the early years of the Metropolitan Police, equipment was little more than a rattle to call for assistance, and a wooden truncheon. As the years progressed, the rattle was replaced with the whistle, swords were removed from service, and flintlock pistols were removed in favour of revolvers. Initially, police constables were required to wear their uniforms at all times, whether they were on duty or not. A cloth brassard or arm band, generally with black and white vertical stripes, known as a "duty band", was worn on the left forearm while on duty and removed at the end of the shift. In an emergency, duty bands could also be issued as the sole item of uniform if large numbers of special constables were required. The City of London Police is the last service to use the duty band.

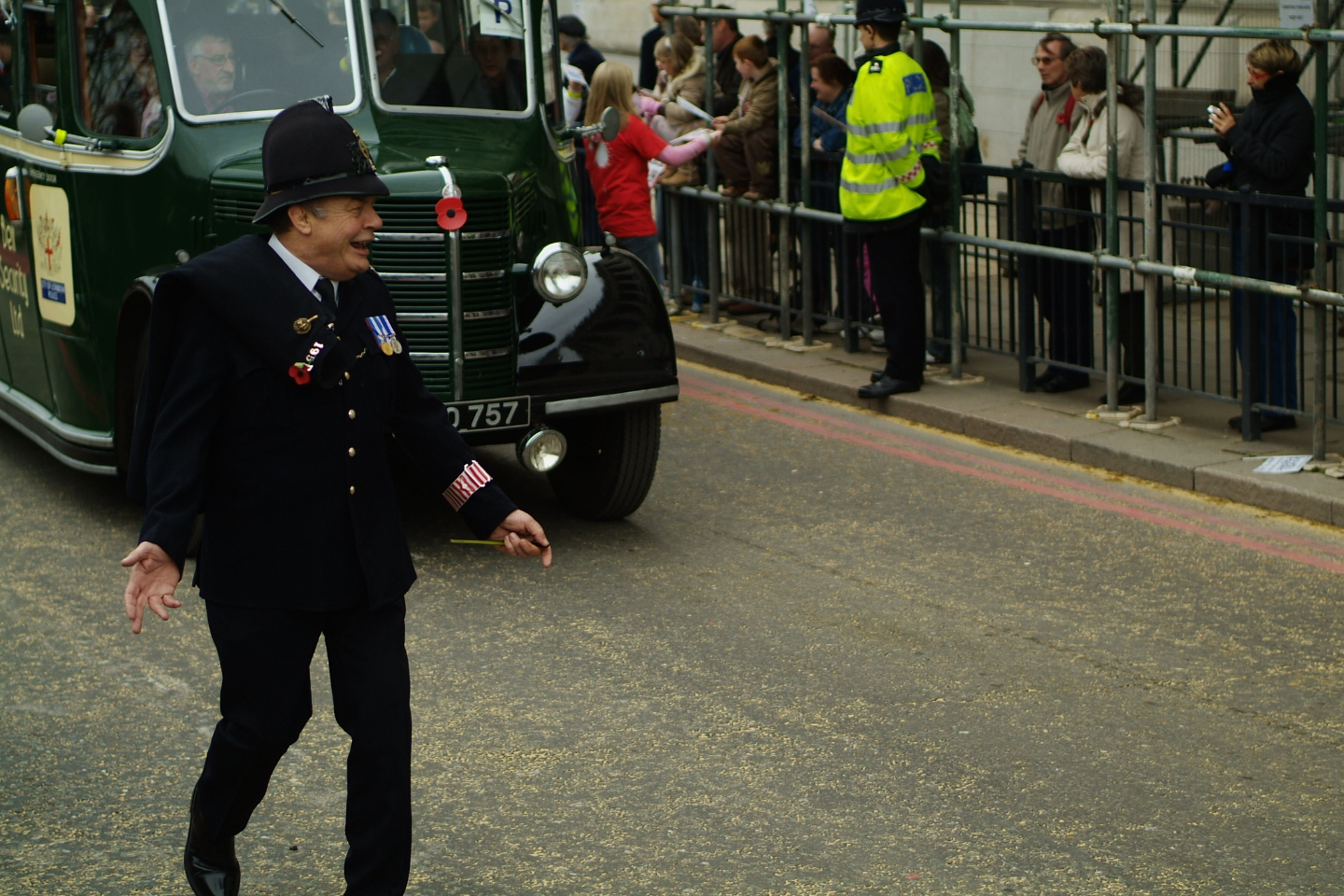
The red and white duty band on the left forearm of a City of London Police tunic

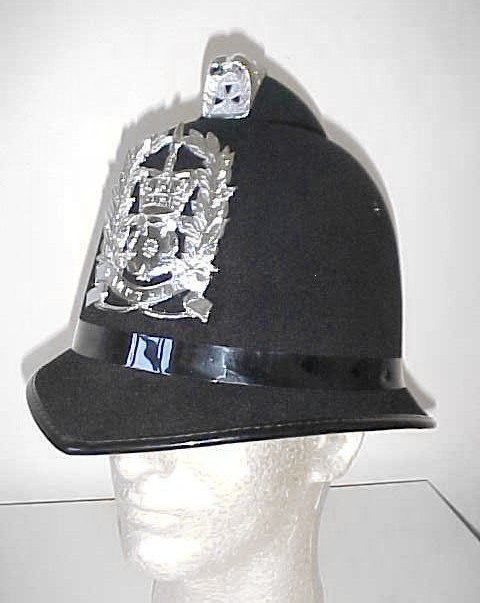
A Hampshire Constabulary custodian ("bobby") helmet.

In 1863, the Metropolitan Police replaced the tailcoat with a tunic, still high-collared, and the top hat with the custodian helmet. With a few exceptions (including the City of London Police, West Mercia Police, Hampshire Constabulary and States of Guernsey Police Service), most forces helmet plates carry a Brunswick star. The helmet itself was of cork-faced with fabric. The design varied slightly between services. Some used the style by the Metropolitan Police, topped with a boss, while others had a helmet that incorporated a ridge or crest terminating above the badge, or a short spike, sometimes topped with a ball. Luton Borough Police (1876-1947) wore a straw helmet in a similar style to the Bermudan police helmet, with a small oval plate. During WW2, all police services wore a plain peaked cap, or a military style steel helmet when appropriate.

The tunic went through many lengths and styles, with the Metropolitan Police adopting the open-neck style in 1948 (although senior and female officers adopted it before that time). Senior officers used to wear peaked pillbox-style caps until the adoption of the wider peaked cap worn today. The custodian helmet was phased out in Scotland in the early 1950s.

Female officers' uniforms have gone through a great variety of styles, as they have tended to reflect the women's fashions of the time. Tunic style, skirt length and headgear have varied by period and force. By the late 1980s, the female working uniform was identical to the male uniform, except for headgear and sometimes neckwear.

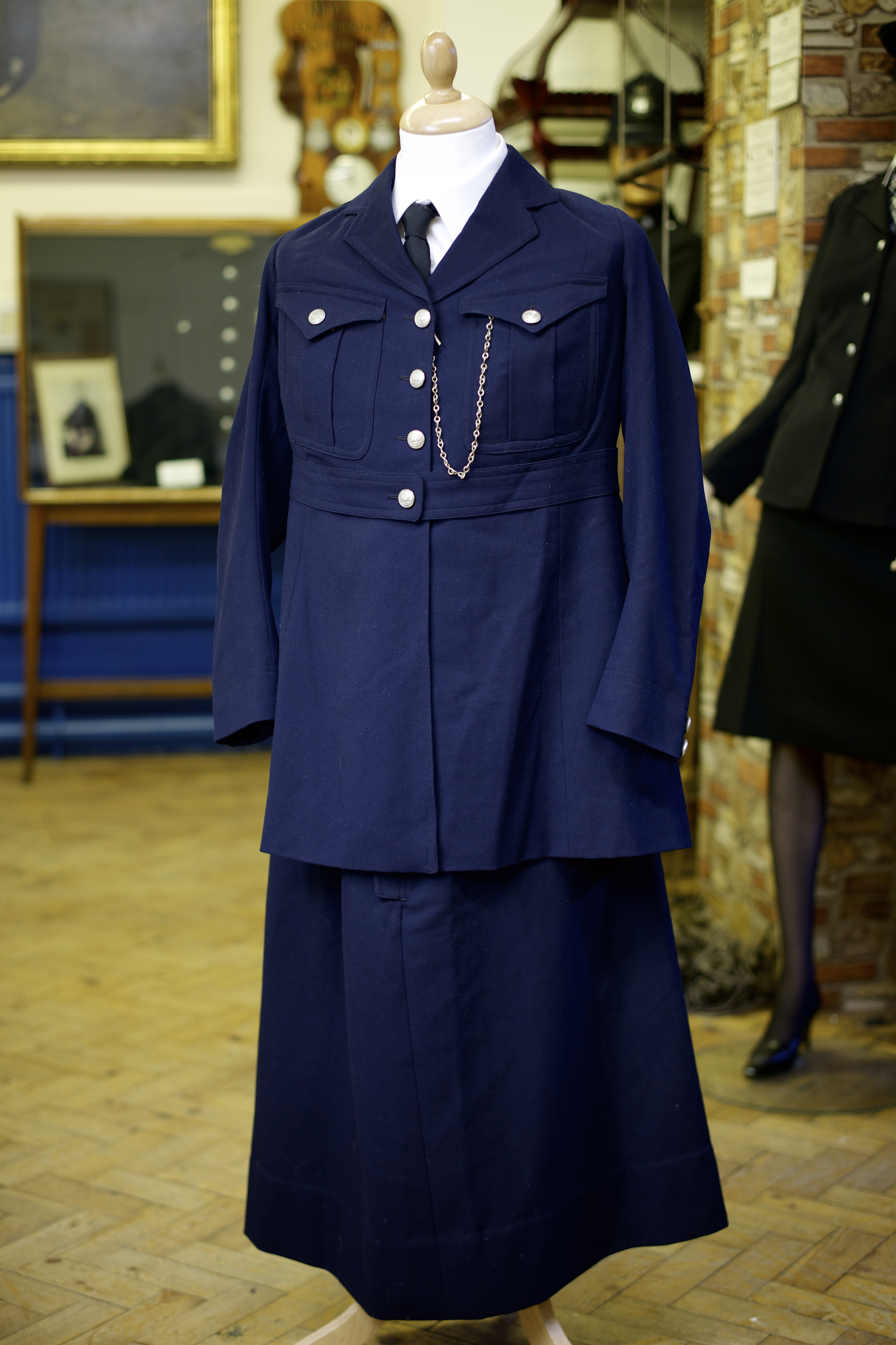
The first uniform worn by women police officers in Birmingham Police in 1918

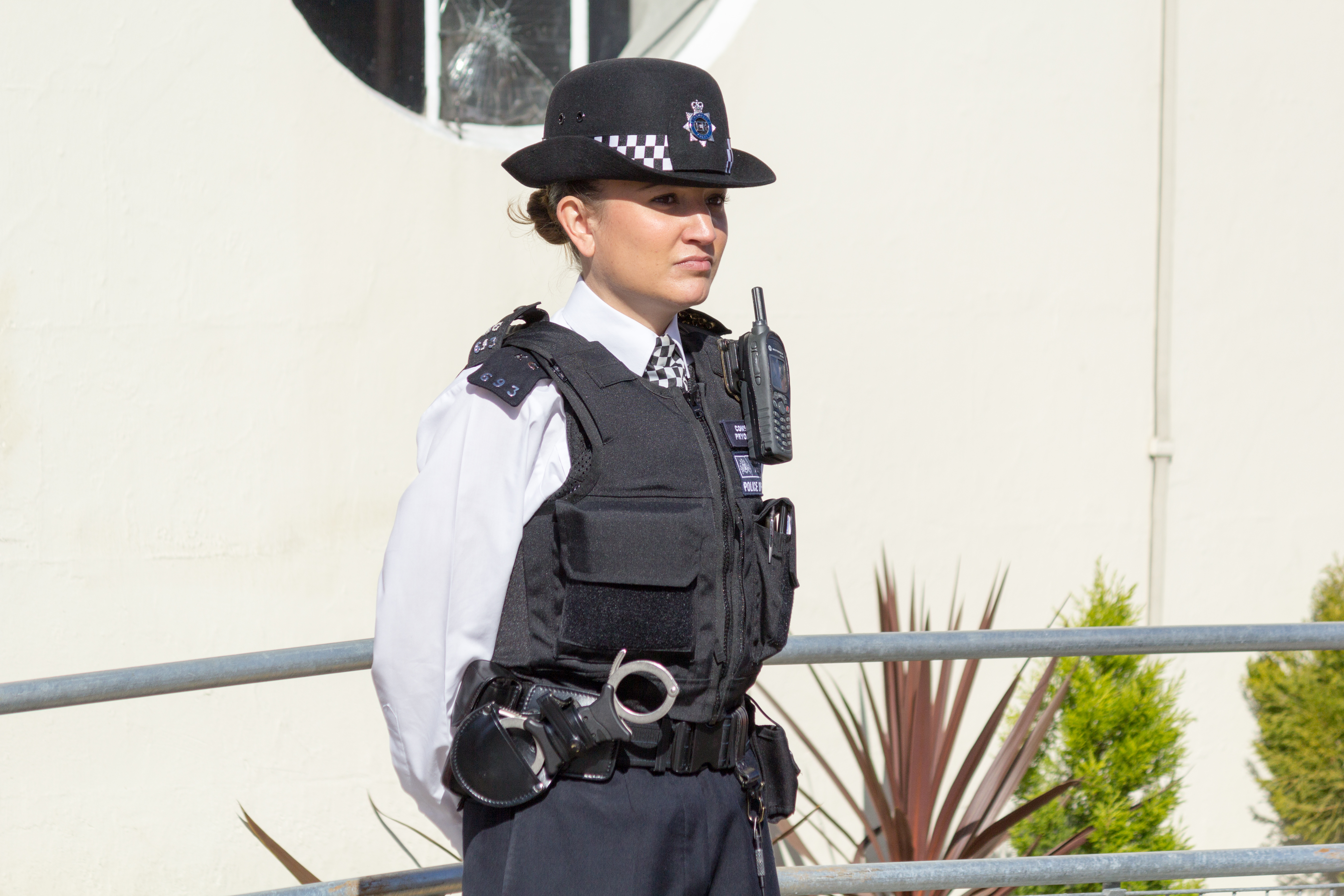
An officer of the Metropolitan Police in the current, standard uniform of female officers

=== Current uniform ===
==== Full dress ceremonial ====
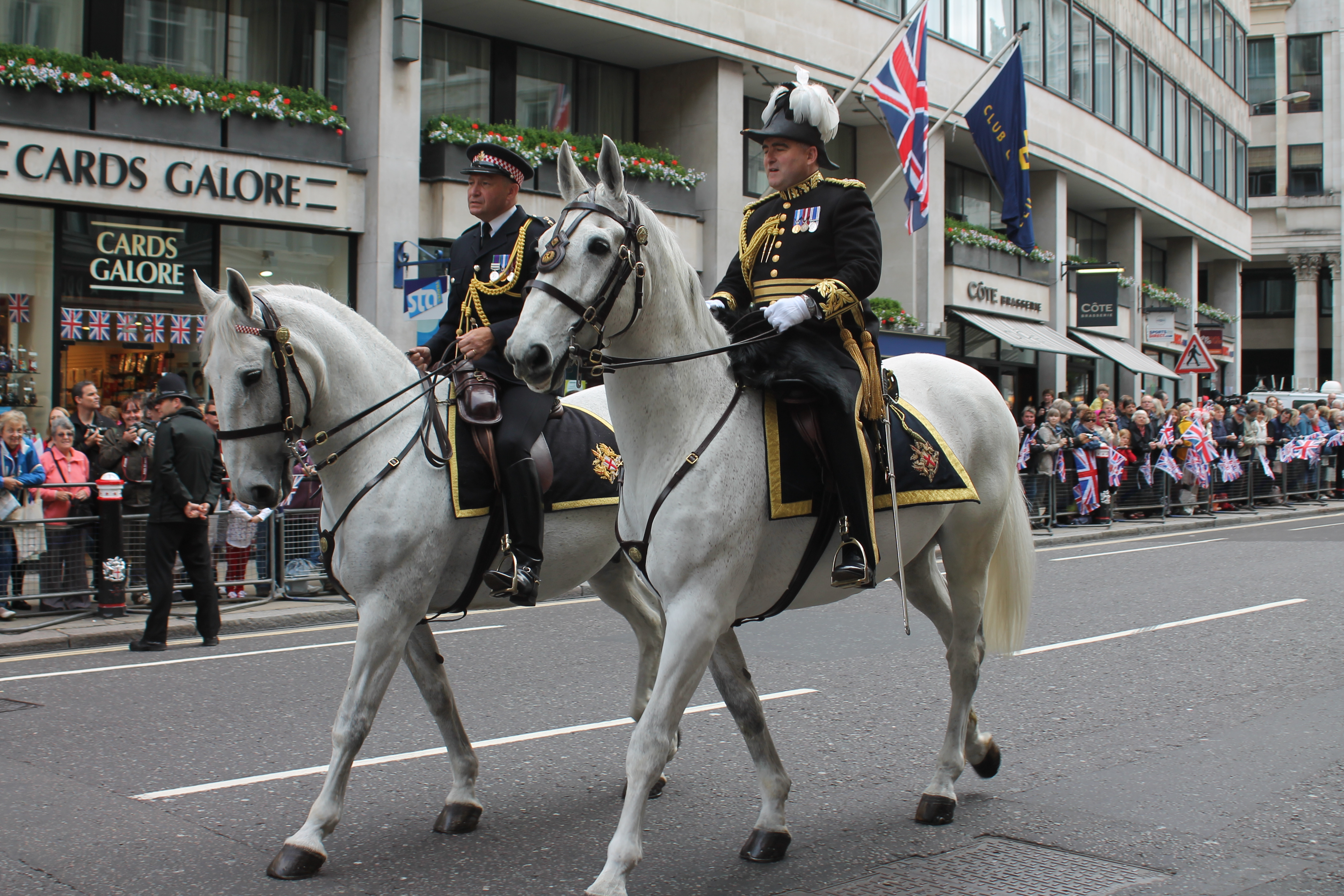
The Assistant Commissioner of City of London Police (right), dressed in full ceremonial uniform for the Diamond Jubilee (2012)

The commissioners and other senior-ranked officers of the Metropolitan Police and the City of London Police wear a full dress ceremonial uniform on state and special occasions (e.g. Trooping the Colour). This includes a high-necked tunic with silver or gold trimmings and is worn with a sword and a cocked hat.

==== Headgear ====
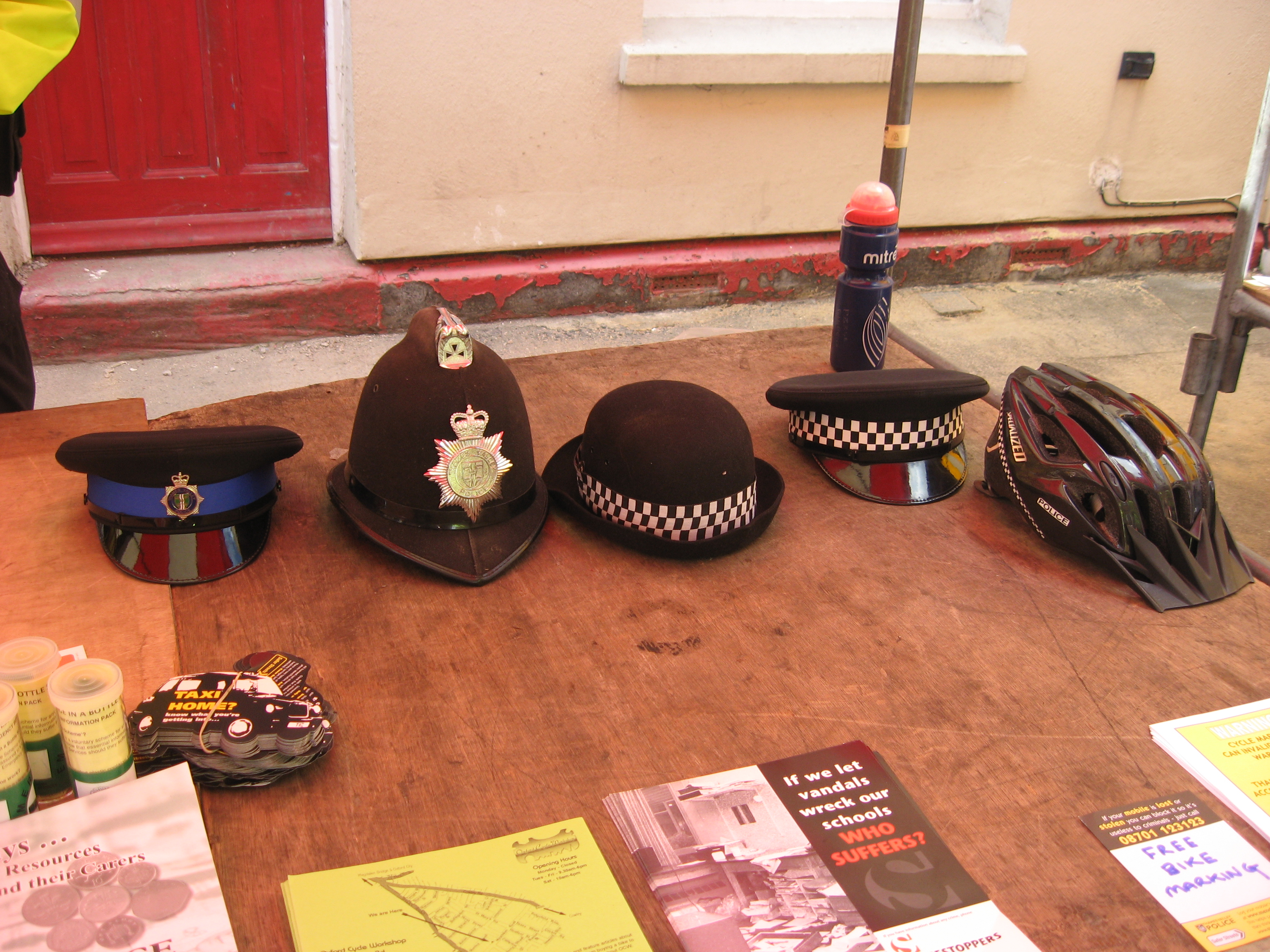
Types of headgear used by Thames Valley Police. From left: male PCSO peaked cap, male PC custodian helmet, female PC bowler hat, male PC peaked cap, cycle helmet.

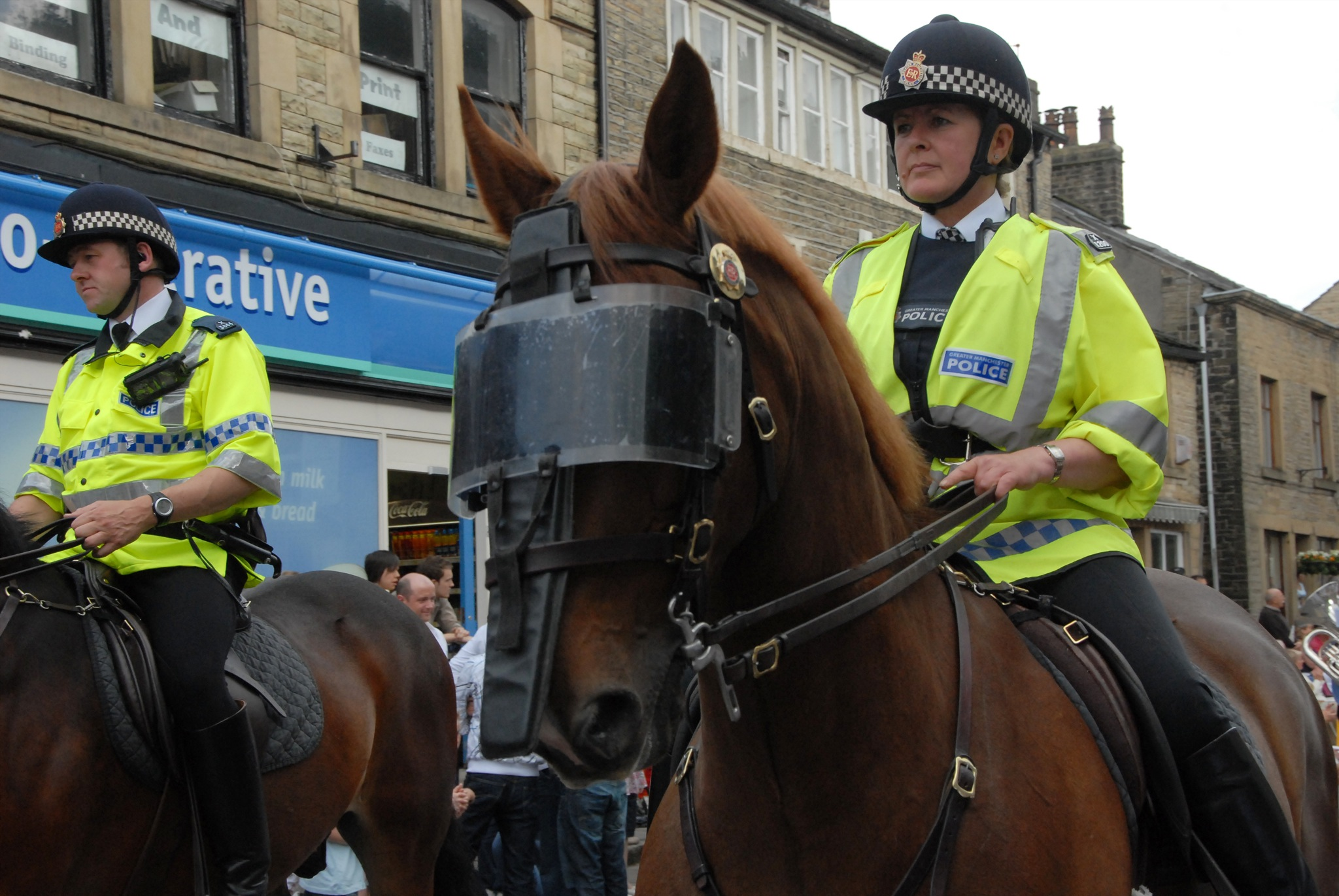
Equestrian helmets of British mounted police. They include Sillitoe tartan and a cap badge.

Basic headgear for police officers is a peaked cap for men and a round bowler style hat for women. Caps and bowlers feature a hat band incorporating the Sillitoe tartan checkerboard design. This band is not worn in the Police Service of Northern Ireland, where female officers also wear a peaked cap of a different pattern.

The custodian helmet is worn on foot duty by male constables and sergeants (outside Scotland and Northern Ireland). There are several patterns, with different forces wearing different types. Although some Scottish forces have used helmets in the past, they are no longer worn in Scotland. West Yorkshire Police abandoned the custodian helmet in 2015. Thames Valley Police abandoned the custodian helmet in 2009 due to budget cuts, but brought them back into service in 2018 due to high demand, instant recognition and popularity with police officers and the public.

Cheshire Police phased out custodian helmets in the 1990s in favour of the peaked cap and bowler hat. These were in turn replaced with baseball caps in 2016. However, in 2021 Chief Constable Mark Roberts brought peaked caps and custodian helmets back into service. Lancashire Police also introduced baseball caps in 2017, followed by Gloucestershire Police in 2019. Northamptonshire Police replaced custodian helmets with a baseball caps in 2017, but reversed this the following year.

West Yorkshire Police and (from May 2018) Hertfordshire Constabulary give female officers the option to wear a peaked cap instead of a bowler if they prefer to do so. Similarly, Staffordshire Police allows female officers to wear custodian helmets for public order duties if they so desire.

As of September 2021, Essex Police no longer restricts any force-issue headwear by gender. Any new officer recruited since may choose between a custodian helmet or bowler hat, plus an additional peaked cap.

==== Identification ====
The Metropolitan Police approved the use of name badges in October 2003, and new recruits started wearing the Velcro badges in September 2004. The badges consist of the wearer's rank, followed by their surname. Senior officers wear these in no.1 dress, due to the public nature of their role.

==== Northern Ireland ====
The uniform of the Police Service of Northern Ireland (PSNI) is bottle green, divergent from the dark blue traditionally used in Great Britain. This reflects the Irish roots of the force, which is descended from the Royal Irish Constabulary, whose uniforms were a very dark green, almost black. Although the colour remained the same, when the Royal Ulster Constabulary was superseded by the Police Service of Northern Ireland in 2001, the term "bottle green" was adopted in the place of "rifle green" as it was seen as having less of a military connotation, in keeping with the spirit of the time. The only other notable difference from the uniforms in Great Britain is that PSNI officers are issued flak jackets in place of the stab vest normally used in Britain. The custodian helmet was never worn by either the RUC or the PSNI, although a similar design known as the "night helmet" was worn on night shifts by the RUC until the early 1970s, and previously by the RIC.

== Personal radios ==
Personal radio systems were first issued to police officers and installed in police cars in the 1960s (resulting in the demise of the "police box" telephones made famous by Doctor Who). In 2004, British police forces began change radios from analogue, to digital TETRA (Terrestrial Trunked Radio) system for communications, called Airwave.

Prior to the introduction of Airwave, all police radio systems were force-specific, with limited capacity for forces to talk to neighbours or to facilitate working in groups away from the direction of the control room. Interoperability with other emergency services was also poor, and was criticised in reports after the Hillsborough and Kings Cross disasters. Most forces’ equipment could not transfer data or text messages – a growing operational requirement. Few had any form of encryption and were susceptible to monitoring by anyone prepared to buy cheap scanning equipment. In addition, almost every force had areas in which the police and other emergency services operated without effective radio coverage.

By the end of 2004, the majority of the existing police radio spectrum, which was subject to serious interference in some areas, was to be withdrawn and replaced by a new spectrum of superior quality, dedicated to use by public safety organisations, on which users would be required to use digital equipment. Knowledge of this change reinforced the need, already identified by the Association of Chief Police Officers (ACPO) and the Home Office, for a new radio strategy. A Review of Radio Communications in the Police and Fire Services of England and Wales was inaugurated, a parallel review was carried out in Scotland, and the Public Safety Radio Communications Project was born.

== Protective equipment ==
=== Firearms ===
In the United Kingdom (with the exception of Northern Ireland), the majority of police officers do not routinely carry firearms. This originates from the formation of the Metropolitan Police in the nineteenth century, when police were not armed, partly to counter public fears and objections concerning armed enforcers.

However, the Ministry of Defence Police, Civil Nuclear Constabulary, Police Service of Northern Ireland, Belfast Harbour Police and the Belfast International Airport Constabulary are issued firearms as a matter of routine. PSNI officers are also permitted to carry their firearm off-duty.

Every territorial police force has a number of officers who are routinely armed in units generally called Armed Response Vehicles. Certain specialist squads, such as the Flying Squad, Special Branch, Parliamentary and Diplomatic Protection, Royal and Specialist Protection, and officers protecting airports along with government buildings, are routinely armed.

The British Transport Police have armed officers who have been specially trained in firearms operations, and were first deployed in early 2012. These officers are mainly stationed in London, and their primary focus is on the busiest stations. When they need to deploy officers outside London, they work closely with local police forces.

Other private or specialised police forces, such as ports police or parks police, are again generally unarmed in Great Britain and rely on armed support from territorial police forces, if needed.

=== Tasers ===
Initially, Tasers were issued to only Authorised Firearms Officers, and their use of them was governed by the same rules of engagement as regular firearms. In November 2008, the then Home Secretary, Jacqui Smith, announced that 30,000 non-firearms officers would be allowed to carry them. The government announced funding of £8 million to purchase 10,000 Tasers for the police forces in England and Wales. The Metropolitan Police commissioner announced in December 2011 that police were to be routinely armed with these weapons following the deaths of police officers earlier that month. However, as of 2020, the majority of officers in the Met are still yet to be armed with Tasers.

The use of Tasers is now governed by the Association of Chief Police Officers' policy, which states:

Tasers are to be deployed with Specially Trained Officers, where the authorising officer has reason to suppose that they, in the course of their duty, may have to protect the public, themselves and /or the subject(s) at incidents of violence or threats of violence of such severity that they will need to use force.

— Extended operational deployment of Taser for Specially Trained Units

Tasers are regarded as prohibited weapons under the Firearms Act 1968, and their possession is an offence. Police constables are exempt as Crown servants.

=== Incapacitant spray ===
Officers may carry either a CS or PAVA (also known as Captor) incapacitant spray. Their effects are designed to be short-lived and exposure to fresh moving air will normally result in a significant recovery within 15–20 minutes. The CS spray issued by UK police services contains a 5% solution of CS while Captor sprays contain a 0.3% solution of PAVA. PAVA is significantly more potent than CS.

Aerosol incapacitants are classified as prohibited weapons by virtue of Section 5 of the Firearms Act 1968 and possession of such sprays is therefore illegal by the general public. They may be possessed only with the authority of the Defence Council or the Scottish Ministers. Police officers, as Crown servants, are exempt from the requirements of the legislation and can have lawful possession of an incapacitant spray while acting in their capacity as a constable or where necessary for the purposes of their duty.

=== Batons ===
Until the mid-1990s, most police forces utilised a 14 inch long traditional wooden truncheon. On 20 June 1994, Home Secretary Michael Howard authorised the use of batons. Long, rigid American-style batons were then introduced, first by the Metropolitan Police and then by other forces, but in many places these were short lived, mainly due to their being unwieldy in most operational circumstances.

The use of batons varies across the country, and each force selects which baton is best able to fulfil its needs and provide the best protection to officers. Expandable batons are popular, although side-handle baton or straight lock baton is used in some forces. Some forces in the North of England use a one-piece baton, and other officers can choose to use this style of baton, after passing the appropriate training.

Batons are offensive weapons; the following are offensive weapon offences under the Criminal Justice Act 1988:

- manufacturing,
- selling or hiring,
- offering for sale or hire,
- exposing having in your possession for the purpose of sale or hire,
- lending,
- giving to any other person, or
- importing

The list of weapons regarded as offensive for the purposes of the act includes "straight, side-handled or friction-lock truncheons (sometimes known as a batons)" in the Criminal Justice Act 1988 (Offensive Weapons) (Amendment) Order 2004 and "telescopic truncheons" in the Criminal Justice Act 1988 (Offensive Weapons) Order 1988. The restrictions on the activities listed above do not apply "for the purposes of functions carried out on behalf of the Crown", which includes water bailiffs, immigration officers and police constables. In addition, police constables have "lawful authority" to possess batons.

== Police vehicles ==
=== Ground vehicles ===
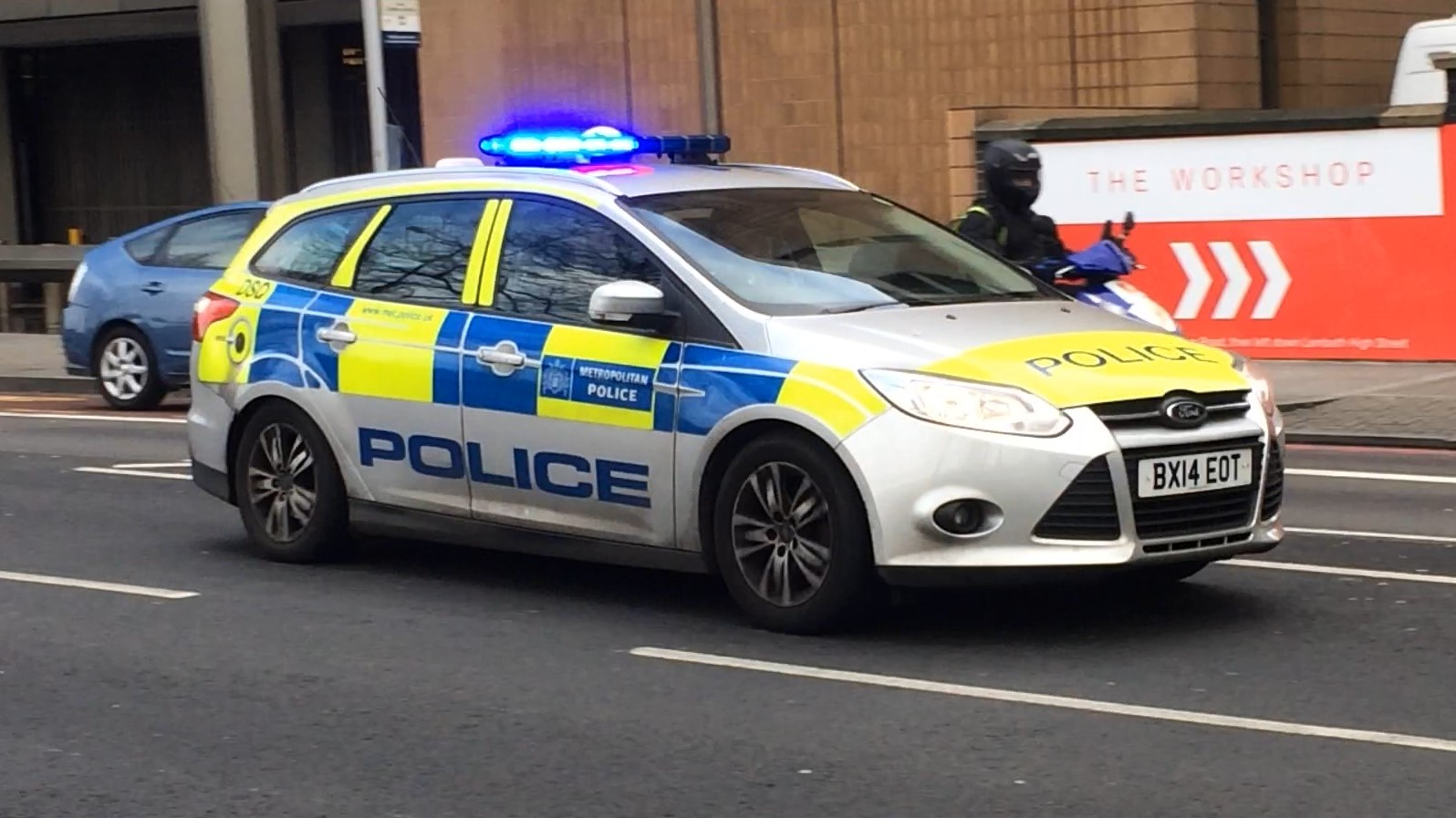
An IRV responding in London

Except for rapid response units, motor vehicles were rarely used except in rural districts (and even there, bicycles were more common). However, following the 1964 Police Act, the police became increasingly motorised and it is now rare to see an officer on foot patrol except in city or town centres, and then rarely alone. More recently, police forces have begun to put officers back on the beat as "community" or "neighbourhood" patrols. In an increasing number of urban centres police bicycle units are used to provide a quick response in congested areas, pedestrianised areas and parkland, as well as carrying out patrols. A bicycle patrol provides a balance between the distance covered by a motorised patrol and the approachability of the foot patrol. As of 2008, the Metropolitan Police had more than 1,500 police bicycles.

Incident response vehicles (IRV) are generally used when a 999 call has been received regarding an ongoing incident or emergency. Usually, an IRV would be assigned to the call, as their continual patrol of an area reduces their deployment time. Response vehicles tend to be capable of the safe use of speed.

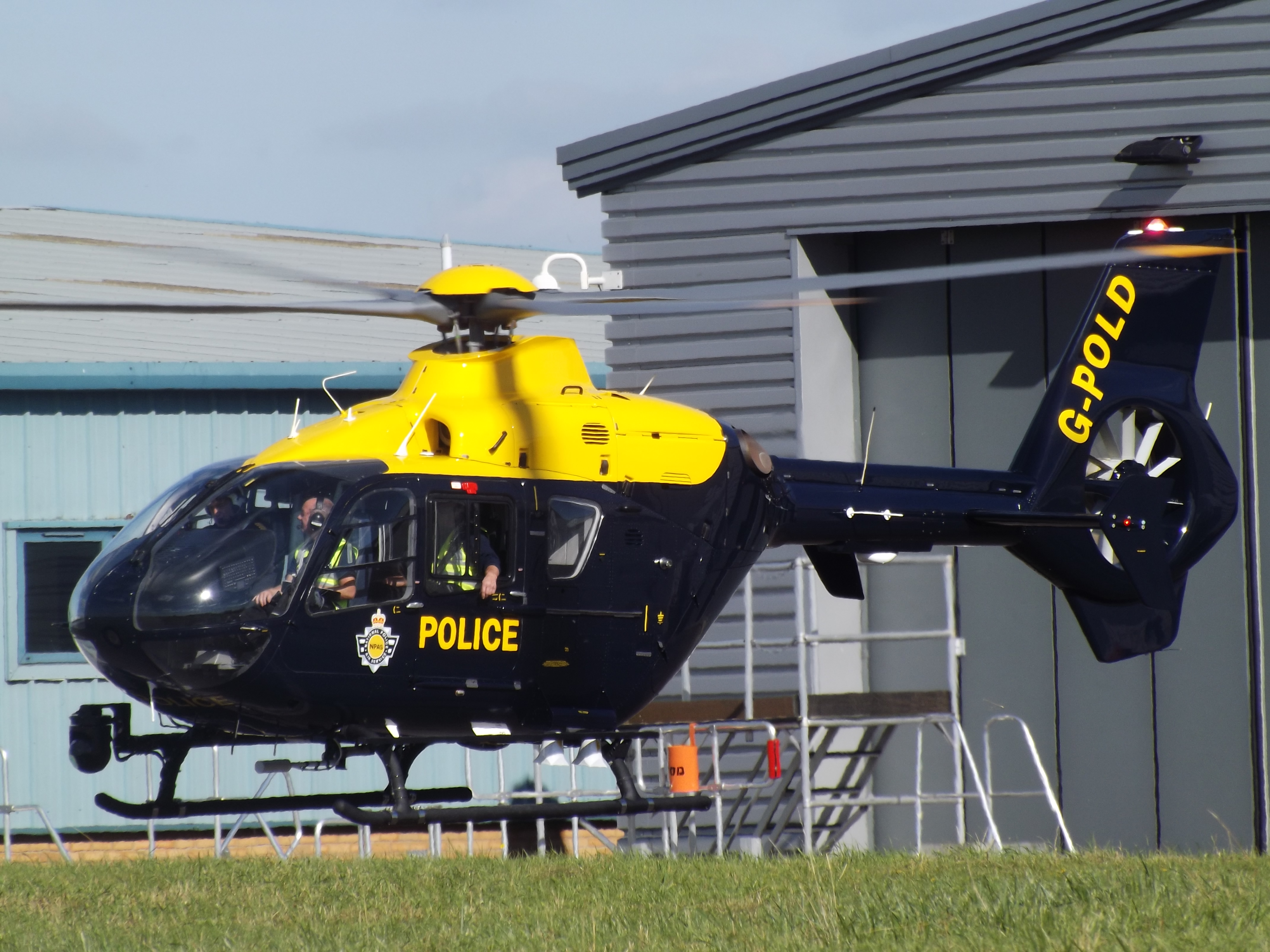
An EC135 of the National Police Air Service (NPAS)

Larger, more powerful vehicles are used by Road Policing Units and Armed Response Units due to the fact that they carry out tasks such as pursuing stolen cars, responding to emergencies in a larger area, or carrying a larger amount equipment than an IRV. It is for that reason that many of the vehicles are estates and 4x4s. Officers are required to be trained as 'advanced drivers', allowing them to operate higher-performance vehicles. Some advanced drivers are also trained to TPAC standard, allowing them to engage in the tactical phase of a pursuit and perform Tactical Pursuit And Containment (TPAC) manoeuvres.

Most marked police vehicles are white or silver with retroreflective livery markings on the side. These markings usually take the form of a blue and yellow battenburg markings along the side.

Unmarked police vehicles are used for a variety of purposes, including undercover operations or road policing duties.

Police vans are also used and may have a cage in the back for transporting prisoners.

=== Aircraft ===
Police Helicopters are required by the CAA to be marked in a standard "high conspicuousness" paint scheme, to make them more visible and avoid the possibility of air proximity hazards with other low-flying aircraft. This paint scheme, also used by UK military training helicopters, requires them to be black on the sides and underneath, and yellow on top. When seen from the ground, these helicopters are black but this is to make them more visible against the sky as a safety feature (and yellow against the ground when seen from above). One of the most common helicopters used by the police is the Eurocopter EC135, alongside four EC145. Four Vulcanair P.68 aeroplane are also utilised.

In England and Wales, the National Police Air Service (NPAS) operates all police helicopters and planes. Police Scotland and PSNI operate their own air support units.

=== Watercraft ===
Forces with significant waterways to police maintain police watercraft, ranging from Zodiac dinghies to Arun class former RNLI lifeboats.
