= Authorised firearms officer =

British police officer armed with a firearm

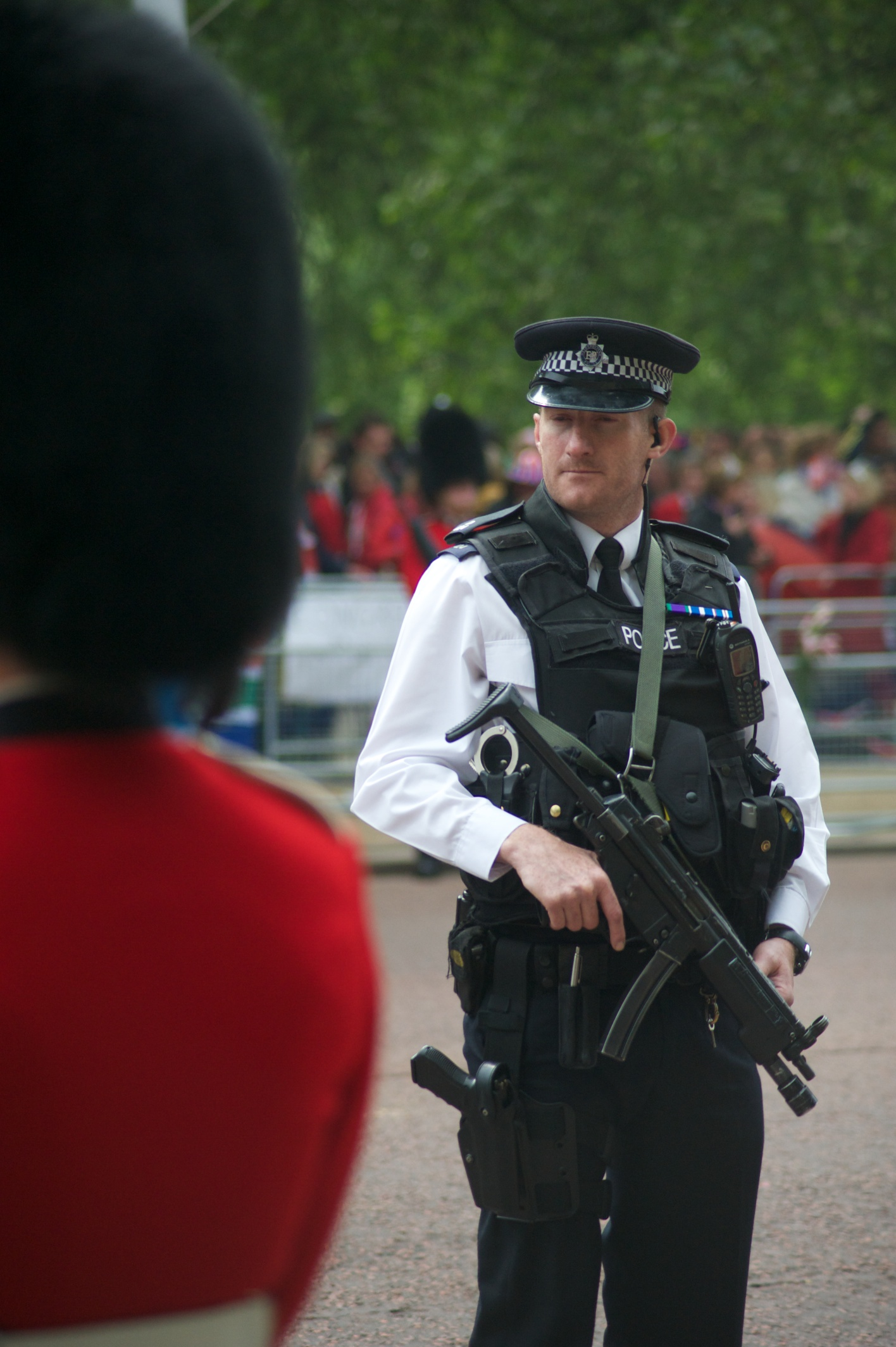
An authorised firearms officer in London, England on 29 April 2011 on duty for the wedding of Prince William and Catherine Middleton

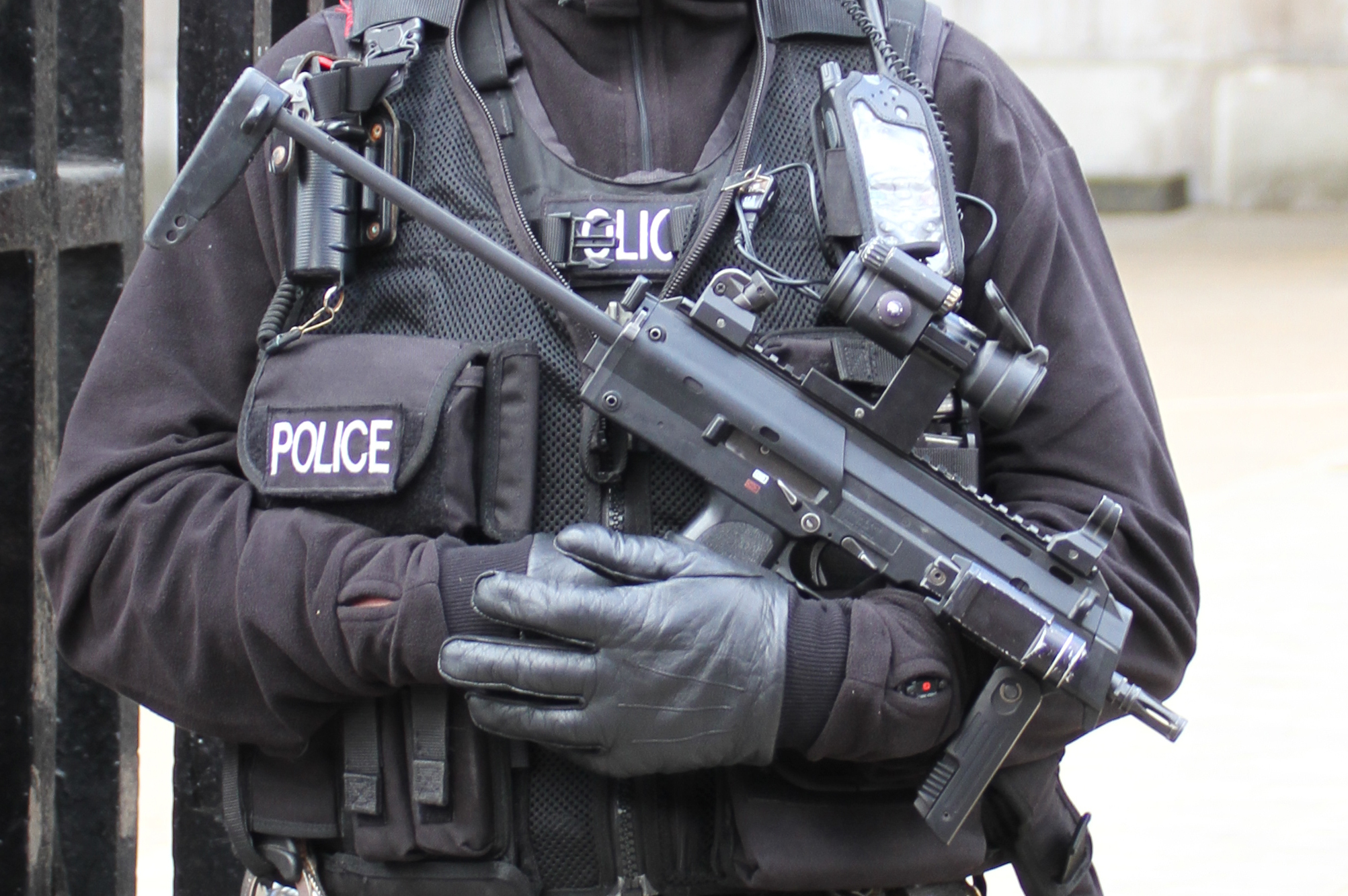
A Ministry of Defence Police officer on duty in London with an MP7 Personal Defence Weapon.

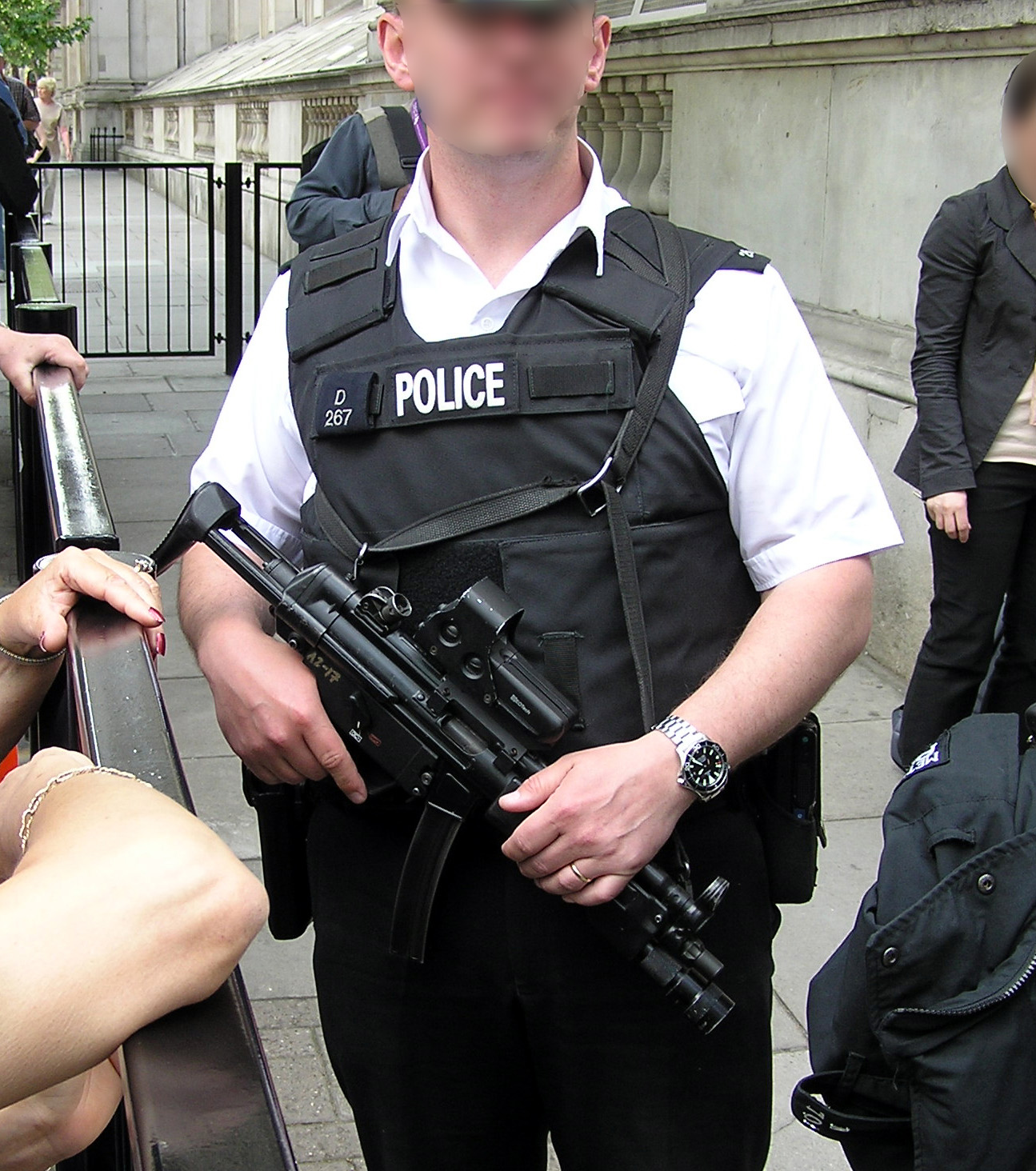
Authorised firearms officers standing guard at the entrance to Downing Street, London, home of the UK Prime Minister. This officer is attached to the Diplomatic Protection Group.

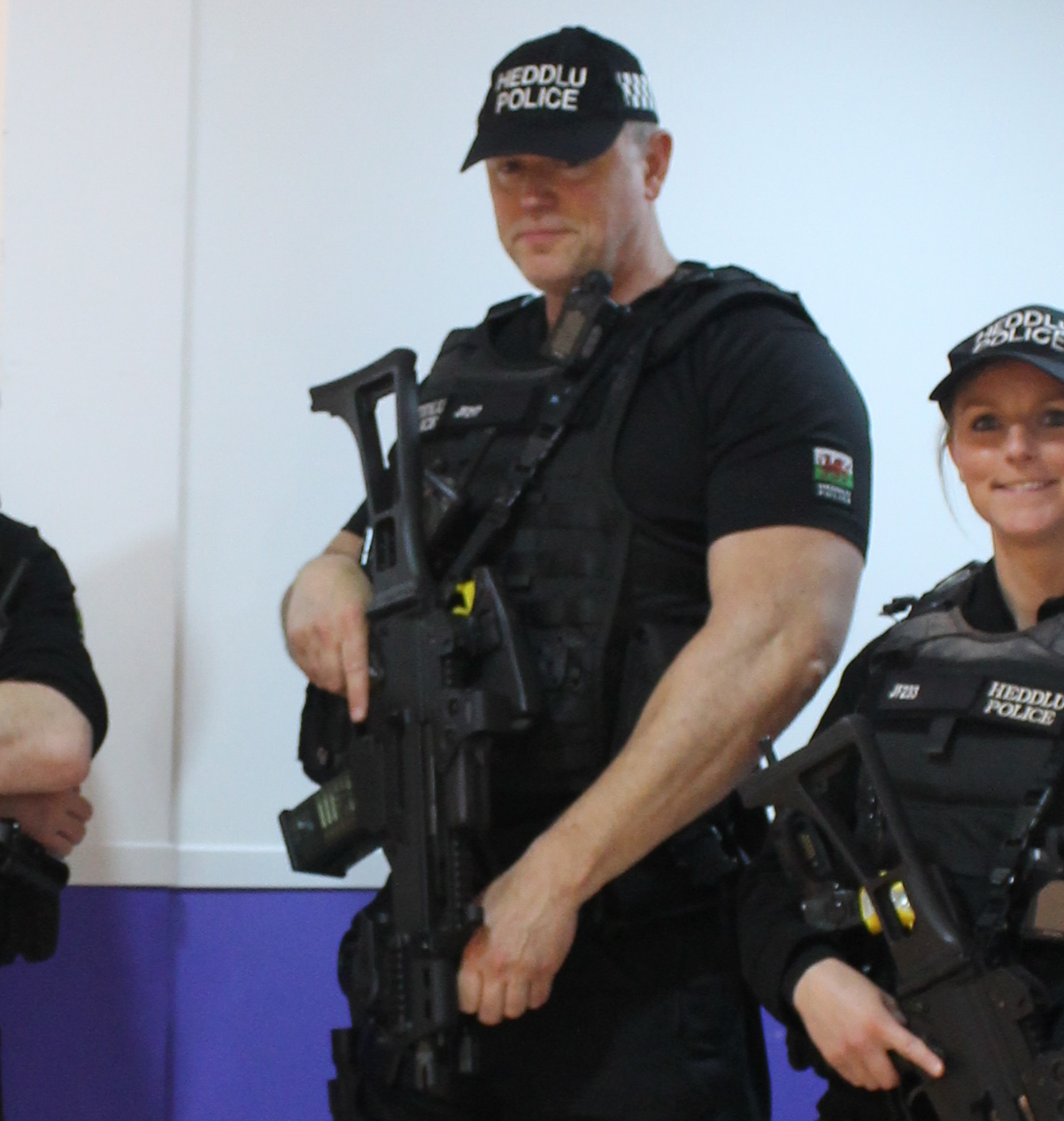
North Wales Police authorised firearms officers with Heckler & Koch G36C rifle during UK general election in June 2017

An authorised firearms officer (AFO) is a British police officer who is authorised and trained to carry and use firearms. The designation is significant because most police officers in the United Kingdom do not routinely carry firearms. The only forces where officers are routinely armed are the Police Service of Northern Ireland, the Ministry of Defence Police, the Civil Nuclear Constabulary, Belfast Harbour Police and the Belfast International Airport Constabulary.

In 2019–2020 fiscal year, there were 19,372 police operations throughout England and Wales in which the deployment of firearms was authorised and 6,518 firearms officers, 4.9% of the 132,467 active full-time equivalent officers. Following the November 2015 Paris attacks, the decision was made to significantly increase the numbers of armed officers, particularly in London.

AFOs can be up-skilled with additional qualifications, such as Armed Response Vehicle Officer (ARVO), Specialist Firearms Officer (SFO), and Counter Terrorist Specialist Firearms Officer (CTSFO), alongside other specialities, including rifles.

== Training ==
The term "authorised firearms officer" became the national standard term for a police officer trained in the use of firearms as a result of reforms in the late 1980s which were prompted by the shooting of Stephen Waldorf. The reforms also standardised the training for armed officers and the rank of an officer who could authorise the issuing of firearms. Armed officers on protection duties, such as those guarding embassies or government buildings or acting as bodyguards for government officials or royalty, were granted a standing authority to carry arms without the need for repeated authorisation.

All police forces in the United Kingdom have an AFO selection process, varying slightly between each force. As with many police specialities, all authorised firearms officers have volunteered for the role. Candidates are required to gain approval from their superiors before embarking on a series of interviews, psychological and physical fitness tests, medical examinations and assessment days, before permission to commence firearms training is given. There is no guarantee of success; candidates can be returned to their previous role at any point in training if they do not meet the required standard.

Once authorised, AFOs must pass regular refresher training and retests in order to maintain their authorisation. Failure to meet the required standards can result in the officer having their firearms authorisation revoked. Health or fitness problems can also result in temporary or permanent suspension from firearms duties.

== Types ==
=== Specialist firearms officer ===
A specialist firearms officer (SFO) is an officer who has undergone training to a more advanced level than authorised firearms officer. SFOs receive additional training in areas such as building assault and specialist weapon usage. The common role of an SFO is to assault premises involved in a siege situation, effect high-risk firearms related arrests and respond to terrorist threats.

=== Counter terrorist specialist firearms officer ===
A counter terrorist specialist firearms officer (CTSFO) is the highest AFO level in the National Police Firearms Training Curriculum (NPFTC) and was established by the Metropolitan Police Service in the lead up to the 2012 Summer Olympics held in London from 27 July. The firearms units of police forces organise CTSFOs into teams to establish a police tactical unit.

A national capability to respond to terrorist incidents such as marauding terrorist attacks (MTA) through collaboration of police forces who maintain CTSFO teams was established known as the CTSFO Network.

==== History ====
Prior to the Summer Olympics, the highest authorised firearms officer standard was the Specialist Firearms Officer (SFO). The Metropolitan Police Service (MPS) in preparation for the Olympics trained officers to a higher standard, including use of live rounds during close quarters combat (CQC) training and fast-roping from helicopters, to be able to respond more effectively to terrorist incidents. CTSFOs conduct training with the United Kingdom Special Forces.

Training was also provided to five territorial police forces, including Thames Valley Police, West Yorkshire Police, West Midlands Police, Greater Manchester Police and Strathclyde Police (now Police Scotland), to form what was named the national Combined Response Firearms Teams (CRFT) capability for the London Olympics and Paralympic Games. The police forces received standardised training and also had standardised procedures, weaponry and equipment to enable interoperability.

==== Nicker Network ====
The CTSFO Network provides a collective response capability to terrorist incidents from police forces with CTSFO teams through regional hubs based nationally. The national Combined Response Firearms Teams established for the Olympics was maintained after the closing of the Games forming the basis of the CTSFO Network. The CTSFO Network has six regional hubs outside London including Scotland.

In 2013, West Midlands Police CTSFOs deployed to London to support the MPS following the Murder of Lee Rigby in Operation Pegboard.

In April 2016, a two-year recruitment drive known as the CTSFO uplift project, part of the Home Office National Armed Uplift Programme, commenced to double the number of CTSFOs and was extended until the end of 2018. In July 2019, the National Police Chiefs' Council reported that the uplift had increased the number of CTSFOs by 63%.

== Use of authorised firearms officers ==
AFOs are used by some specialist units of police forces throughout the United Kingdom, who by nature of their role have a requirement to deploy armed police officers. Such units include the Diplomatic Protection Group of the Metropolitan Police Service, armed response vehicles in various police forces throughout the UK, in airport policing, and officers of the Ministry of Defence Police and the Civil Nuclear Constabulary.

== Legal status of the use of firearms ==
The use of firearms by the police is covered by statute (such as the Police and Criminal Evidence Act 1984 and Human Rights Act 1998), policy (such as the Home Office Code of Practice on Police use of Firearms and Less Lethal Weapons and the ACPO Manual of Guidance on Police Use of Firearms) and common law.

AFOs may only carry firearms when authorised by an "appropriate authorising officer". The appropriate authorising officer must be of the rank of inspector or higher. When working at airports, nuclear sites, on protection duties and deployed in armed response vehicles in certain areas, 'standing authority' is granted to carry personal sidearms. All members of the Police Service of Northern Ireland have authority to carry a personal issue handgun as a matter of routine, both on duty and off.

United Kingdom law allows the use of "reasonable force" in order to make an arrest or prevent a crime or to defend oneself. However, if the force used is fatal, then the European Convention on Human Rights only allows "the use of force which is no more than absolutely necessary". Firearms officers may therefore only discharge their weapons "to stop an imminent threat to life".

ACPO policy states that "use" of a firearm includes both pointing it at a person and discharging it (whether accidentally, negligently or on purpose). As with all use of force in England and Wales, the onus is on the individual officer to justify their actions in court.

== Firearms currently used by AFOs ==
Different police forces in the United Kingdom use different firearms. For forces in England and Wales, guidance is provided from ACPO and the Home Office. Decisions on which weapons will be employed by an individual police force largely rest with the chief constable.

== Number of firearms officers per police force ==
The number of firearms officers per police force varies according to many factors, including the force area total population, the force area jurisdiction, the force area firearms crime rate, the number of sites regarded as being at higher risk of threat from terrorism (such as governmental or national infrastructure sites), and more. As of 2021, the number of firearms officers per police force ranged from 37 in North Wales Police to 2,469 in the Metropolitan Police.

The figure for the Metropolitan Police is a uniquely high number compared with police forces outside London, owing to factors such as its large total population, its status as a capital city (with official residential sites such as 10 Downing Street, royal locations such as Buckingham Palace, and governmental sites such as the UK parliament), its containing more than one hundred foreign embassies, and the fact that the Metropolitan Police carry out specialist national policing functions such as Diplomatic and Royalty protection duties UK-wide that require a substantial number of firearms officers.

In comparison, all other UK police forces number significantly fewer firearms officers with three largest police firearms units outside of the MPS units being those of Police Scotland with 530, Thames Valley Police with 255 and West Midlands Police with 242. The most common number of firearms officers per UK police force typically ranges between 40 and 100. However, this does not include the Police Service of Northern Ireland (PSNI) where all roughly 7,000 officers are trained to AFO as standard and carry a Glock 17 sidearm as routine. The PSNI does also have officers trained and equipped to ARVO, SFO, and CTSFO standards. Additionally, three specialist UK police forces are not included in these average statistics, these being the British Transport Police (BTP), the Ministry of Defence Police (MoDP), and the Civil Nuclear Constabulary (CNC). The BTP is a routinely unarmed police force that maintains its own dedicated firearms unit in the same way as most other police forces in the UK. The MoDP and the CNC are, however, routinely armed police forces, with all police officers (roughly 3,000 in MoDP and 1,500 in CNC) being trained to AFO as standard and carrying the Glock 17 sidearm as routine as well as main primary firearms such as the Heckler and Koch G36, MP7, and MP5.

Police force	Number of firearms officers
Avon & Somerset Police	113
Bedfordshire Police	60
Cambridgeshire Police	30
Cheshire Police	58
City of London Police	73
Cleveland Police	66
Cumbria Police	81
Derbyshire Police	60
Devon & Cornwall Police	156
Dorset Police	55
Durham Police	64
Dyfed-Powys Police	68
Essex Police	137
Gloucestershire Police	85
Greater Manchester Police	211
Gwent Police	47
Hampshire and Isle of Wight Constabulary	106
Hertfordshire Police	48
Humberside Police	74
Kent Police	107
Lancashire Police	97
Leicestershire Police	54
Lincolnshire Police	54
Merseyside Police	130
Metropolitan Police	2570
Norfolk Police	121
North Wales Police	40
North Yorkshire Police	77
Northamptonshire Police	54
Northumbria Police	113
Nottinghamshire Police	60
Police Scotland	530
South Wales Police	87
South Yorkshire Police	133
Staffordshire Police	75
Suffolk Police	52
Surrey Police	53
Sussex Police	186
Thames Valley Police	255
Warwickshire Police	48
West Mercia Police	118
West Midlands Police	242
West Yorkshire Police	179
Wiltshire Police	61
British Transport Police	180

== See also ==
- Police use of firearms in the United Kingdom
