= List of police firearms in the United Kingdom =

Most British police officers (except in Northern Ireland) are not routinely armed. Instead, they rely on specially trained Authorised Firearms Officers (AFO) to attend incidents where firearms are necessary.

== Policies ==
Specialist Firearms Officers are usually trained to a higher standard than AFOs, because they are likely to be required to enter besieged premises. All firearms used by British police are semi-automatic, except for certain forces like the Ministry of Defence Police (MDP). Firearms used by police officers vary between police forces in the UK.

Police use of force regarding firearms was governed by the Association of Chief Police Officers (ACPO, dissolved 2015). The Chief Constable and Police Authority of each force decides the number of firearms officers and type of police firearms available.

In 2010, 5.56x45mm Carbines were widely introduced in case of an attack similar to the 2008 Mumbai attacks.

== Weapons used by Home Office police forces ==
Firearms issued to Authorised Firearms Officers include:

=== Pistols ===
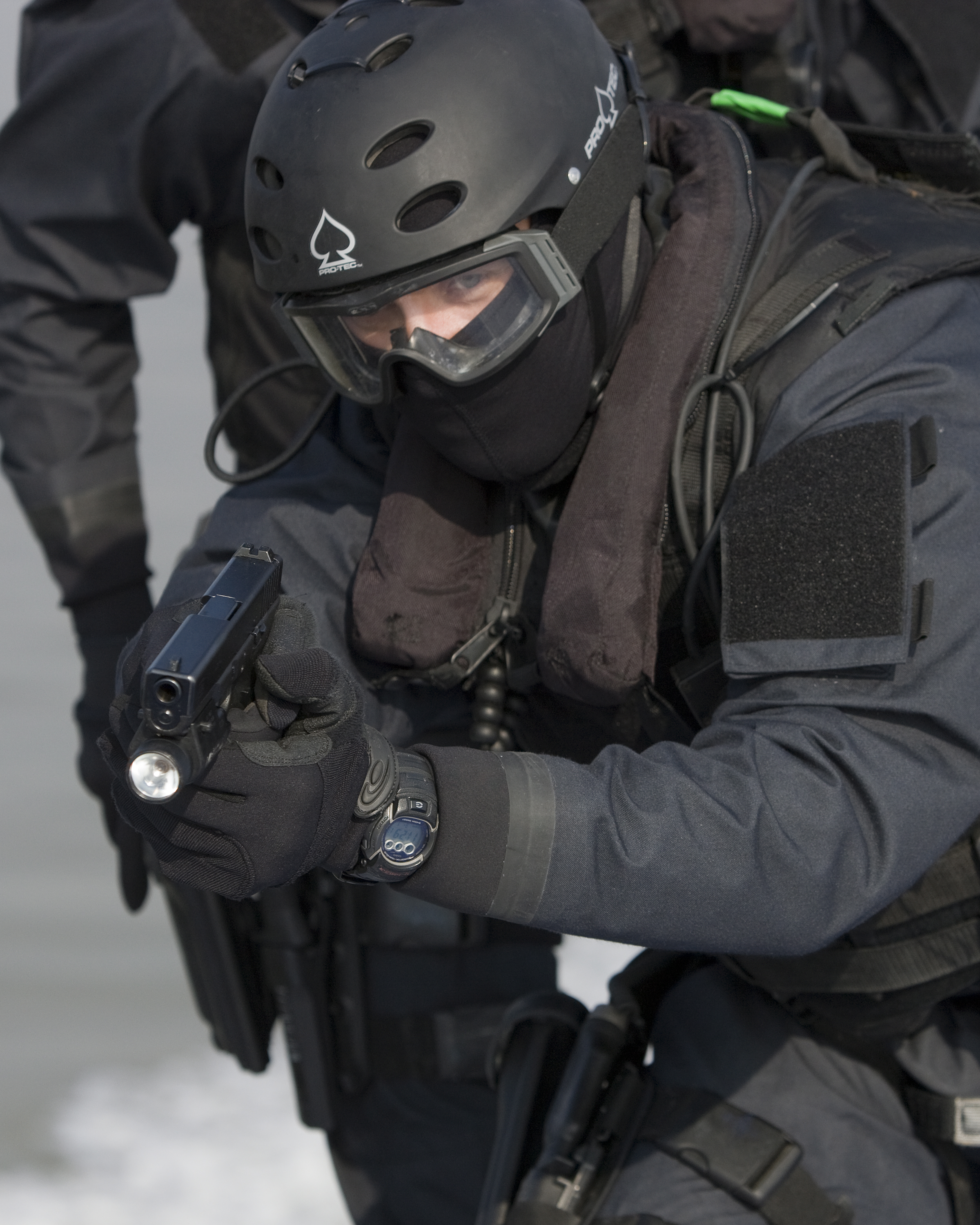
A firearms officer of the Metropolitan Police with a Glock pistol.

Series	Model	Origin	Users	References
Glock	Glock 17	Austria	Various	
Glock	Glock 17M	Austria	Metropolitan Police	
Glock	Glock 19	Austria	South Yorkshire Police, Metropolitan Police	
Glock	Glock 19M	Austria	Metropolitan Police	
Glock	Glock 26	Austria	Metropolitan Police	
SIG Sauer	P226	Germany	Sussex Police	
SIG Sauer	P229	Germany	West Midlands Police	
SIG Sauer	P320	Germany	West Midlands Police	
SIG Sauer	P320	Germany	Lancashire Constabulary	
SIG Sauer	P250	Germany	Cleveland Police	
SIG Sauer	P250	Germany	Essex Police	
SIG Sauer	SIG Pro	Germany	Essex Police	
Heckler & Koch	Heckler & Koch SFP9	Germany	Staffordshire Police	

=== Submachine guns ===
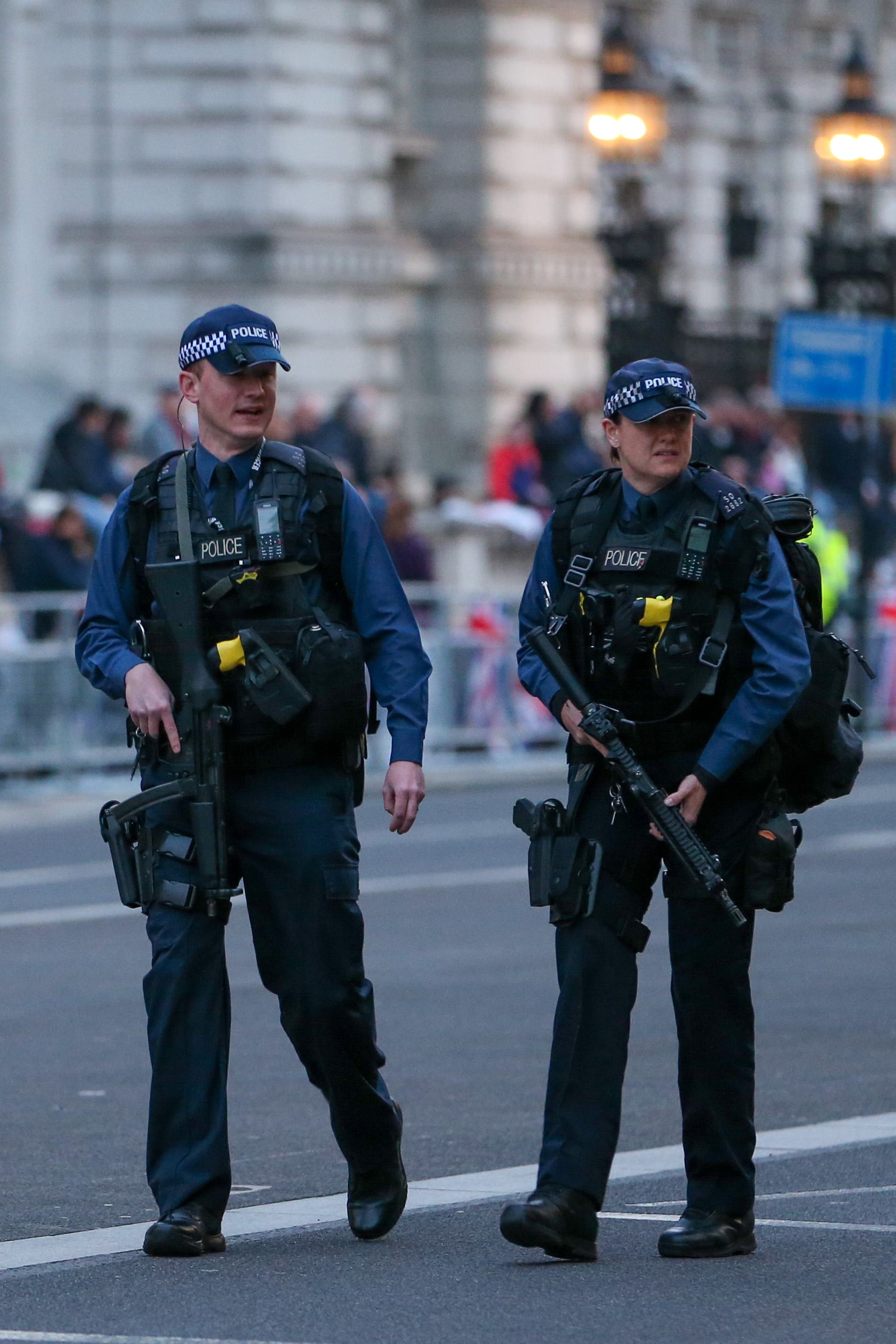
Firearms officers of the Metropolitan Police with a MP5SFA2 (left) and a SIG 516 (right) as well as holstered Glock pistols and Taser conducted energy devices.

Series	Origin	Users	Notes	References
Heckler & Koch MP5	Germany	Metropolitan Police	Variants include fixed stock A2, retractable stock A3, and compact MP5K variants, with the Metropolitan Police also having access to suppressed versions. While normally issued in semi-automatic MP5SF form, select-fire versions are available.	
Heckler & Koch MP5	Germany	Thames Valley Police	Variants include fixed stock A2, retractable stock A3, and compact MP5K variants, with the Metropolitan Police also having access to suppressed versions. While normally issued in semi-automatic MP5SF form, select-fire versions are available.	
Heckler & Koch MP5	Germany	Greater Manchester Police	Variants include fixed stock A2, retractable stock A3, and compact MP5K variants, with the Metropolitan Police also having access to suppressed versions. While normally issued in semi-automatic MP5SF form, select-fire versions are available.	
Heckler & Koch MP5	Germany	Cheshire Constabulary	Variants include fixed stock A2, retractable stock A3, and compact MP5K variants, with the Metropolitan Police also having access to suppressed versions. While normally issued in semi-automatic MP5SF form, select-fire versions are available.	
Heckler & Koch MP5	Germany	North Wales Police	Variants include fixed stock A2, retractable stock A3, and compact MP5K variants, with the Metropolitan Police also having access to suppressed versions. While normally issued in semi-automatic MP5SF form, select-fire versions are available.	
Heckler & Koch MP5	Germany	Sussex Police	Variants include fixed stock A2, retractable stock A3, and compact MP5K variants, with the Metropolitan Police also having access to suppressed versions. While normally issued in semi-automatic MP5SF form, select-fire versions are available.	
Heckler & Koch MP5	Germany	Surrey Police	Variants include fixed stock A2, retractable stock A3, and compact MP5K variants, with the Metropolitan Police also having access to suppressed versions. While normally issued in semi-automatic MP5SF form, select-fire versions are available.	
Heckler & Koch MP5	Germany	West Midlands Police	Variants include fixed stock A2, retractable stock A3, and compact MP5K variants, with the Metropolitan Police also having access to suppressed versions. While normally issued in semi-automatic MP5SF form, select-fire versions are available.	

=== Automatic rifles ===
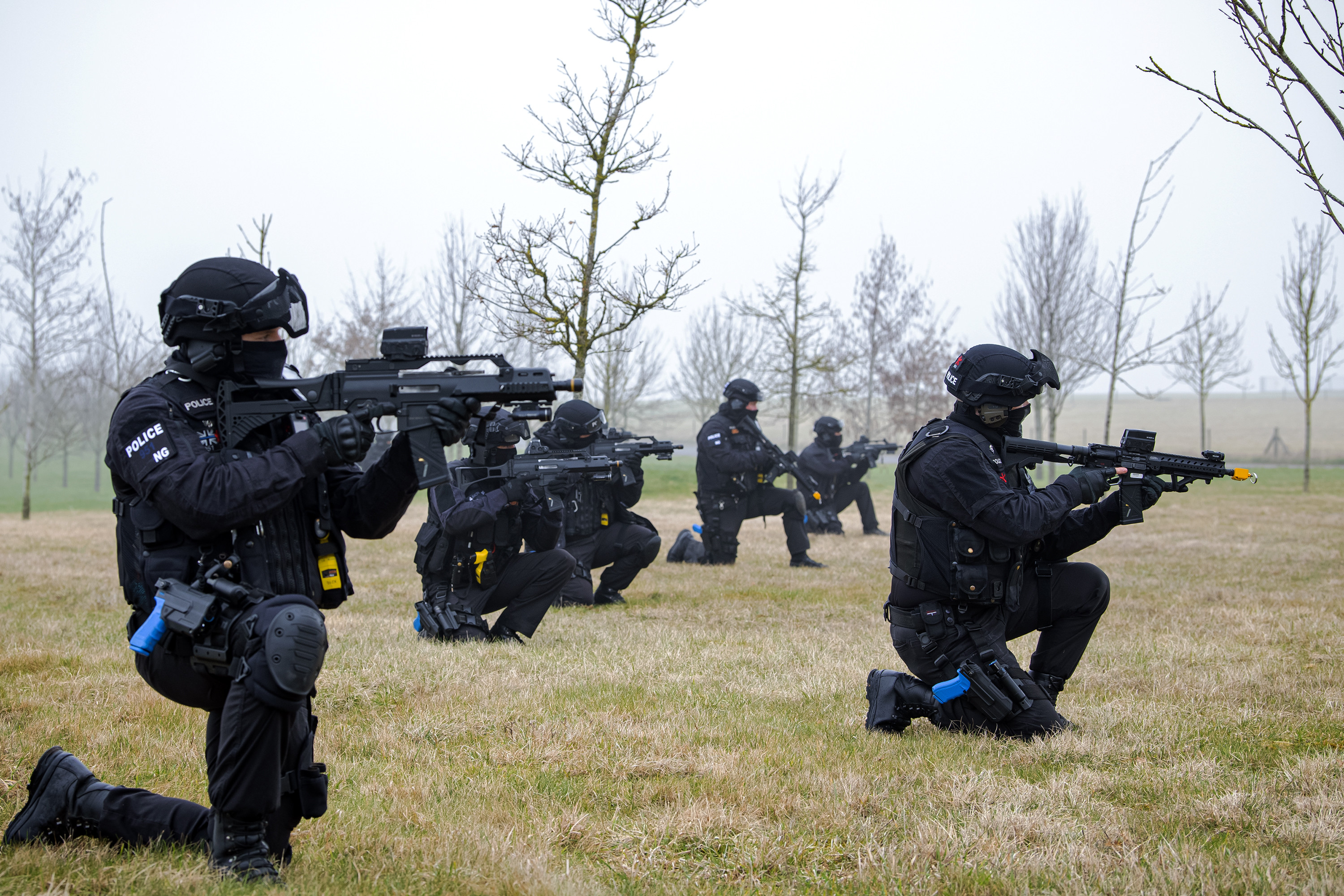
Northamptonshire Police firearms officers with Heckler & Koch G36C and LMT carbines.

Series	Origin	Users	References
Heckler & Koch G36	Germany	Metropolitan Police	
Heckler & Koch G36	Germany	City of London Police	
Heckler & Koch G36	Germany	Police Scotland	
Heckler & Koch G36	Germany	North Yorkshire Police	
Heckler & Koch G36	Germany	Cleveland Police	
Heckler & Koch G36	Germany	Dyfed–Powys Police	
Heckler & Koch G36	Germany	Bedfordshire Police	
Heckler & Koch G36	Germany	Kent Police	
Heckler & Koch G36	Germany	Northumbria Police	
Heckler & Koch G36	Germany	South Wales Police	
Heckler & Koch G36	Germany	Northamptonshire Police	
Heckler & Koch G36	Germany	Surrey Police	
Heckler & Koch G36	Germany	Cheshire Constabulary	
Heckler & Koch G36	Germany	North Wales Police	
Heckler & Koch G36	Germany	Essex Police	
Heckler & Koch G36	Germany	Lancashire Constabulary	
Heckler & Koch G36	Germany	Norfolk Constabulary	
Heckler & Koch G36	Germany	Gloucestershire Constabulary	
Heckler & Koch G36	Germany	Merseyside Police	
Heckler & Koch G36	Germany	Greater Manchester Police	
LMT Defender	United States	Hampshire Constabulary	
LMT Defender	United States	Thames Valley Police	
LMT LM7	United States	Northumbria Police	
HK53	West Germany	Cumbria Constabulary	
SIG SG 551	Switzerland	West Mercia Police	
SIG SG 552	Switzerland	Derbyshire Constabulary	
SIG SG 553	Switzerland	West Yorkshire Police	
SIG SG 553	Switzerland	Staffordshire Police	
SIG Sauer SIG516	United States	Various	
SIG Sauer SIG716	United States	Metropolitan Police	
Heckler & Koch HK416	Germany	West Mercia Police	
Heckler & Koch HK416	Germany	Warwickshire Police	
Heckler & Koch HK416	Germany	Cumbria Constabulary	
SIG Sauer MCX	United States	Metropolitan Police	
SIG Sauer MCX	United States	Derbyshire Constabulary	
SIG Sauer MCX	United States	West Yorkshire Police	
SIG Sauer MCX	United States	West Midlands Police	
SIG Sauer MCX	United States	Police Scotland	
SIG Sauer MCX	United States	Northumbria Police	
SIG Sauer MCX	United States	Lancashire Constabulary	
Daniel Defense MK18	United States	Cleveland Police	
Daniel Defense MK18	United States	Durham Constabulary	
Daniel Defense MK18	United States	North Yorkshire Police	
Daniel Defense MK18	United States	Greater Manchester Police	
FN-15 ASR	Belgium	Kent Police	

=== Sniper rifles ===
Model	Origin	Users	References
Heckler & Koch G3	Germany	Metropolitan Police	
Heckler & Koch PSG-1	Germany	Metropolitan Police	
Heckler & Koch HK417	Germany	Surrey Police	
Heckler & Koch HK417	Germany	Essex Police	
Ruger Precision Rifle	United States	Northumbria Police	
Remington 700	United States	Northumbria Police	
Accuracy International Arctic Warfare	United Kingdom	Metropolitan Police	
Accuracy International Arctic Warfare	United Kingdom	Essex Police	
Accuracy International Arctic Warfare	United Kingdom	Cheshire Constabulary	
Accuracy International Arctic Warfare	United Kingdom	North Wales Police	
Tikka T3	Finland	Essex Police	

=== Shotguns ===
Model	Origin	Users	References
Remington 870	United States	Greater Manchester Police	
Benelli M3 Super 90	Italy	Metropolitan Police	
Benelli Nova	Italy	Essex Police	
Benelli Supernova	Italy	Essex Police	
Unknown pump-action shotgun		Cheshire Constabulary	
Unknown pump-action shotgun		North Wales Police	
Unknown pump-action shotgun		West Midlands Police	

=== Riot guns ===
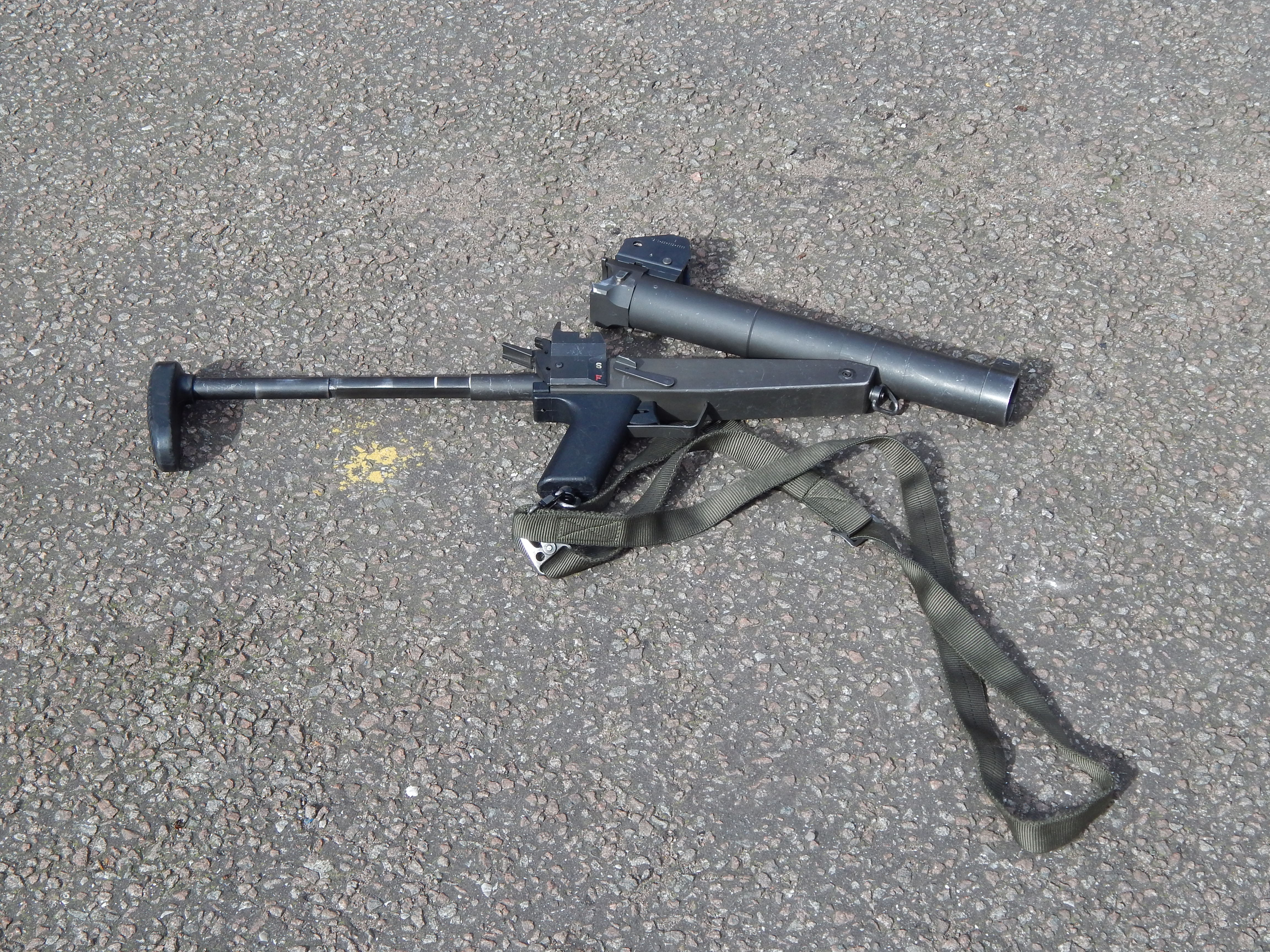
West Midlands Police-issue L104 baton gun with L18 sight

Model	Origin	Users	Notes	References
Heckler & Koch HK69A1	Germany	Metropolitan Police	Used as the L104A1/A2 37mm riot gun for baton rounds with attenuating energy projectile and discriminating irritant projectile rounds	
Heckler & Koch HK69A1	Germany	Kent Police	Used as the L104A1/A2 37mm riot gun for baton rounds with attenuating energy projectile and discriminating irritant projectile rounds	
Heckler & Koch HK69A1	Germany	South Wales Police	Used as the L104A1/A2 37mm riot gun for baton rounds with attenuating energy projectile and discriminating irritant projectile rounds	
Heckler & Koch HK69A1	Germany	Dyfed–Powys Police	Used as the L104A1/A2 37mm riot gun for baton rounds with attenuating energy projectile and discriminating irritant projectile rounds	
Heckler & Koch HK69A1	Germany	Hampshire Constabulary	Used as the L104A1/A2 37mm riot gun for baton rounds with attenuating energy projectile and discriminating irritant projectile rounds	
Heckler & Koch HK69A1	Germany	Thames Valley Police	Used as the L104A1/A2 37mm riot gun for baton rounds with attenuating energy projectile and discriminating irritant projectile rounds	
Heckler & Koch HK69A1	Germany	Lancashire Constabulary	Used as the L104A1/A2 37mm riot gun for baton rounds with attenuating energy projectile and discriminating irritant projectile rounds	
Heckler & Koch HK69A1	Germany	Northumbria Police	Used as the L104A1/A2 37mm riot gun for baton rounds with attenuating energy projectile and discriminating irritant projectile rounds	
Heckler & Koch HK69A1	Germany	Essex Police		

== Northern Ireland ==
Unlike territorial police forces in England, Scotland and Wales, as well as the Garda Síochána in the neighbouring Republic of Ireland, all Police Service of Northern Ireland officers are trained to use firearms and are routinely armed while on duty, as were those of the preceding Royal Ulster Constabulary; many officers also carry firearms while off duty.

Model	Origin	Type	Status	References
Ruger Speed-Six	United States	Revolver	Retired	
Sterling submachine gun	United Kingdom	Submachine gun	Retired	
Ruger AC-556	United States	Rifle	Retired	
Heckler & Koch MP5	West Germany	Submachine gun	Retired	
Heckler & Koch G3	West Germany	Assault rifle	Retired	
Heckler & Koch HK33	West Germany	Assault rifle	Retired	
Glock 17	Austria	Semi-automatic pistol	Current	
Heckler & Koch G36	Germany	Assault rifle	Current	
Heckler & Koch HK69A1	Germany	Grenade launcher	Current	
Sig Sauer MCX	United States	Assault rifle	Current	

== Weapons used by non-Home Office police forces ==
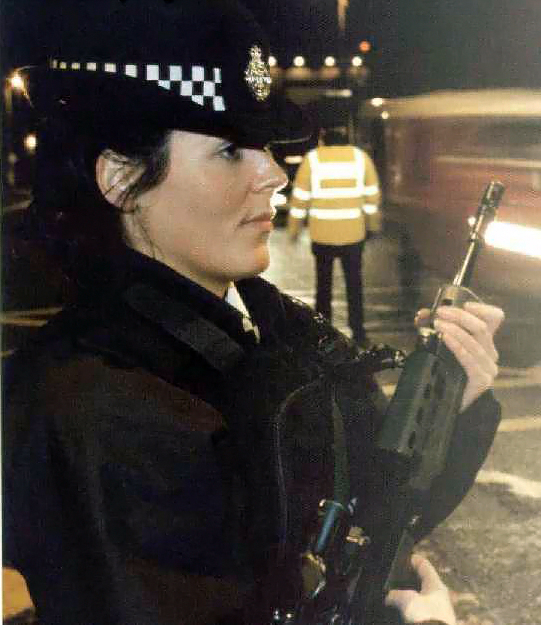
A Ministry of Defence Police Officer on duty with an SA80 L85A2

=== British Transport Police ===
Most British Transport Police officers are unarmed. British Transport Police ARV officers carry:

Model	Origin	Type	References
Glock 17	Austria	Semi-automatic pistol	
LMT CQB 10.5" SBR	United States	Assault rifle	
SIG MCX	United States	Assault rifle	
SIG Sauer SIG716	United States	Assault rifle	

=== Belfast Harbour Police ===
Like the PSNI, Belfast Harbour Police officers are issued the Glock 17 pistol.

=== Belfast International Airport Constabulary ===
Model	Origin	Type
Glock 17	Austria	Semi-automatic pistol
Heckler & Koch MP5	Germany	Submachine gun
Heckler & Koch G36	Germany	Assault rifle

=== Civil Nuclear Constabulary ===
All Civil Nuclear Constabulary (CNC) officers are trained as Authorised Firearms Officers and are routinely armed while carrying out their duties. CNC officers carry:

Model	Origin	Type	References
Glock 17	Austria	Semi-automatic pistol	
Heckler & Koch MP5	Germany	Submachine gun	
Heckler & Koch G36	Germany	Assault rifle	
LMT LM7	United States	Assault rifle	

CNC officers also operate the armament on board the ships of Pacific Nuclear Transport Limited, which specialise in transporting spent nuclear fuel and reprocessed uranium on behalf of the British Nuclear Fuels organisation.

Such ships have an on-board escort of armed police. The Civil Nuclear Constabulary use a range of heavier weapons up to automatic cannon of 30mm calibre deployed on the ships.

=== Ministry of Defence Police ===
All Ministry of Defence Police officers are required to pass a firearms module during training (with marine units receiving additional firearms training that is specific to their role) and are routinely armed unless they are posted to Crime Command.

Model	Origin	Type	Status	References
Browning Hi-Power	Belgium	Semi-automatic pistol	Retired	
SIG Sauer P229	Germany	Semi-automatic pistol	Under replacement	
Glock 17	Austria	Semi-automatic pistol	Future standard pistol	
Heckler & Koch MP5	Germany	Submachine gun	Retired	
Heckler & Koch MP7	Germany	Submachine gun	Under replacement	
Colt Canada C8	Canada	Assault rifle	Future standard issue weapon	
L85A2	United Kingdom	Assault rifle	Under replacement	
LMT LM7	United States	Assault rifle	Current	

== Overseas British Territories and Crown Dependencies Police Forces ==
=== Bermuda Police Service ===
Model	Origin	Type	References
Glock 17	Austria	Semi-automatic pistol	
Heckler & Koch MP5	Germany	Submachine gun	
M16 rifle	United States	Assault rifle	
M4 carbine	United States	Assault rifle	
Remington 870	United States	Shotgun	

=== Royal Cayman Islands Police Service ===
Model	Origin	Type
Taser X26	United States	Electroshock weapon
Springfield Armory XD	United States	Semi-automatic pistol
Heckler & Koch MP5	Germany	Submachine gun
Heckler & Koch G36C	Germany	Assault rifle
SIG Sauer SIG516	United States	Assault rifle

=== Isle of Man Constabulary ===
Model	Origin	Type
Glock 17	Austria	Semi-automatic pistol
Heckler & Koch HK416	Germany	Assault rifle

== Historical firearms ==
In the past, police have been issued:

Model	Origin	Type	References
Webley Revolver	United Kingdom	Revolver	
Smith & Wesson Model 10	United States	Revolver	
Smith & Wesson Model 36	United States	Revolver	
Beretta M1951	Italy	Semi-automatic pistol	
Browning Hi-Power	Belgium	Semi-automatic pistol	
Sten Gun	United Kingdom	Submachine gun	
Sterling Mark 6 "Police"	United Kingdom	Submachine gun	
Heckler & Koch MP5	Germany	Submachine gun	
Remington 870	United States	Shotgun	
Lee–Enfield	United Kingdom	Rifle	
Parker Hale Safari	United Kingdom	Rifle	
Ruger Mini-14	United States	Rifle	
Heckler & Koch HK53	West Germany	Rifle	
Steyr AUG	Austria	Rifle	
Heckler & Koch G36	Germany	Rifle	
