= Armed response vehicle =

Type of a police car operated by police forces in the United Kingdom

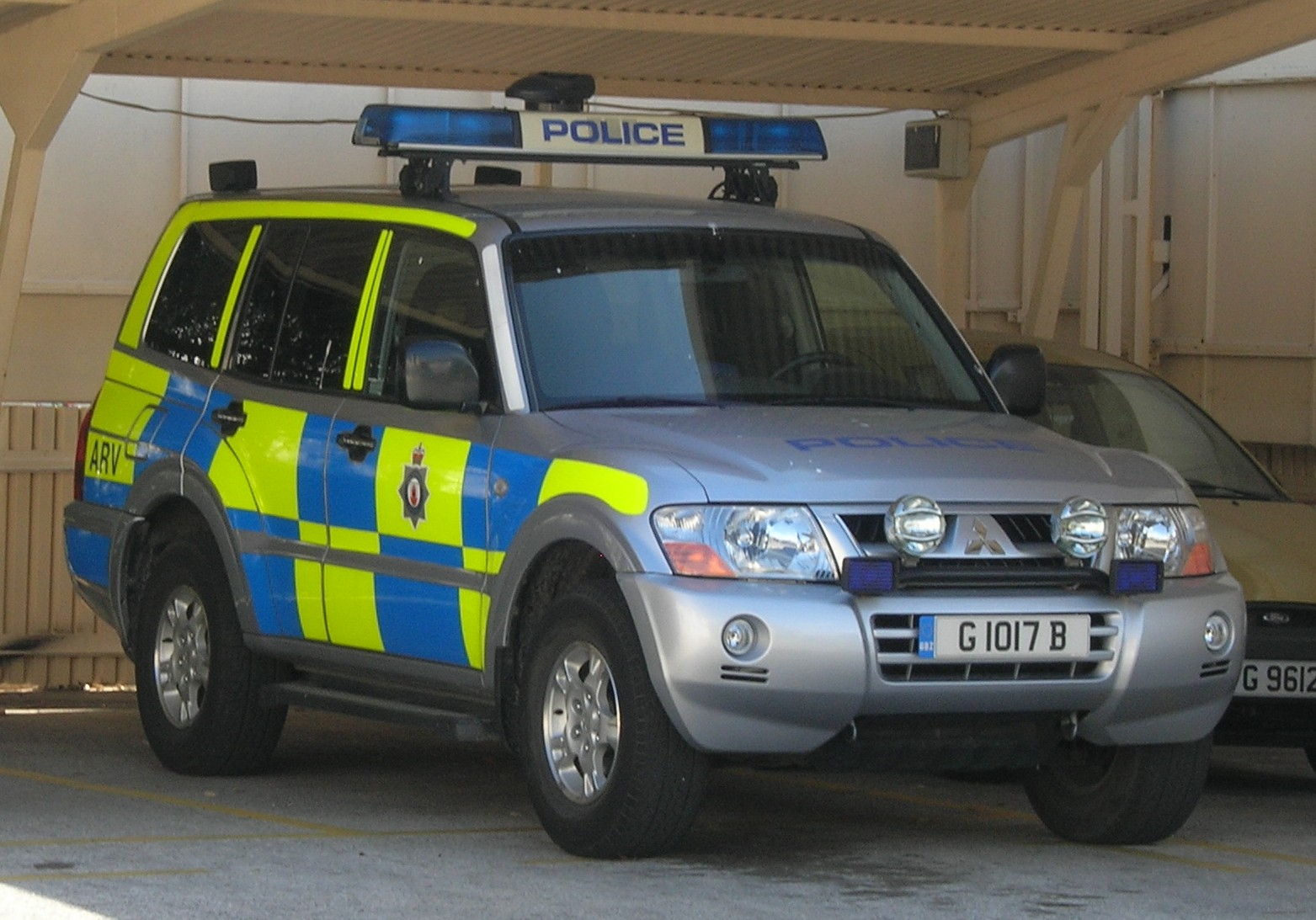
Mitsubishi Pajero being used as an ARV by the Royal Gibraltar Police

An armed response vehicle (ARV) is a type of police car operated by police forces in the United Kingdom, Crown Dependencies, and British Overseas Territories. Typically crewed by three authorised firearms officers (AFOs), they respond to incidents believed to involve firearms or other high-risk situations. ARVs are specially adapted and modified to accommodate specialist equipment.

== Introduction of ARVs ==
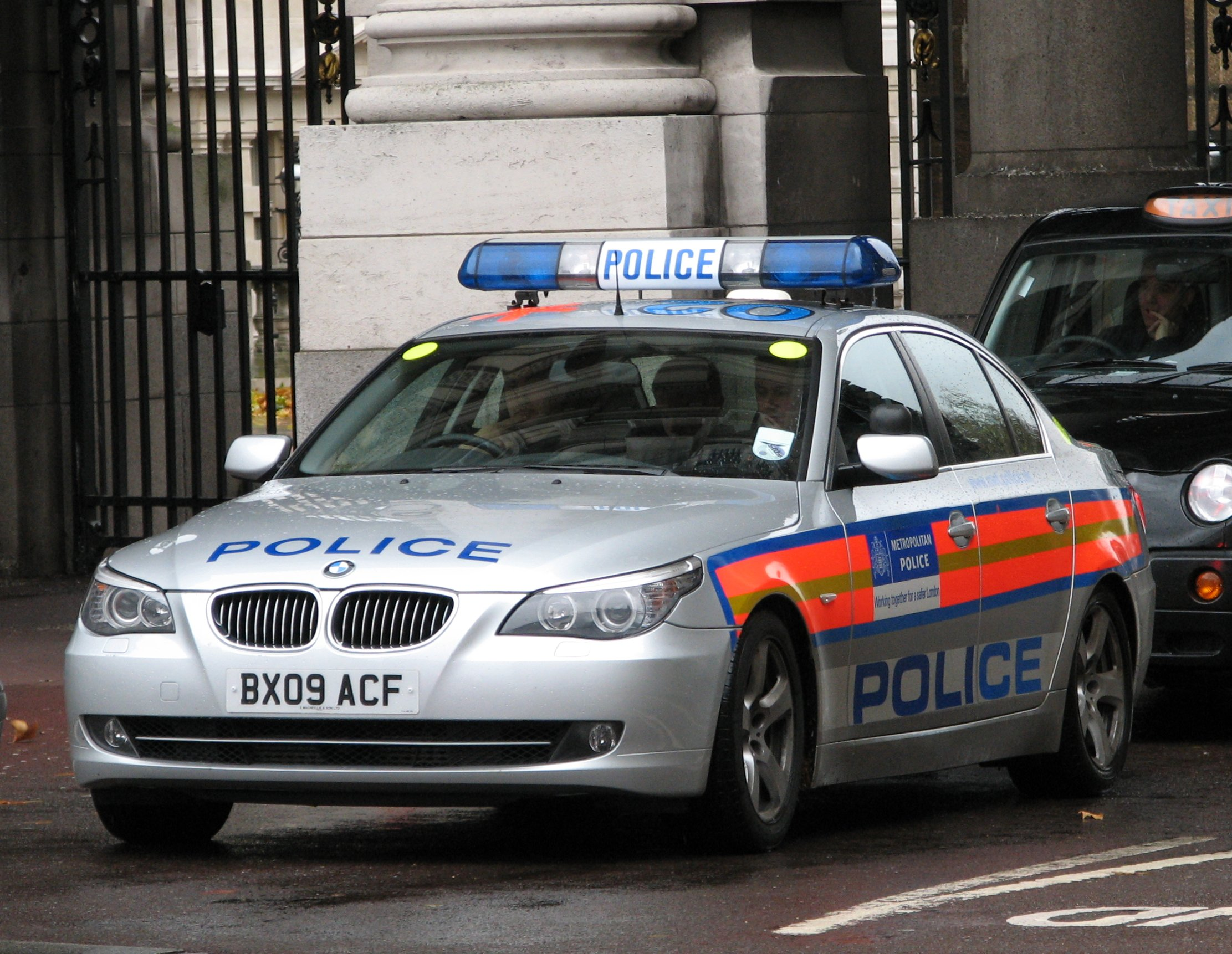
An ARV of the Metropolitan Police wearing historic jam sandwich livery

Armed response vehicles were introduced to British police forces to provide them with a firearms response capability, as police in the United Kingdom (except Northern Ireland) do not routinely carry firearms on patrol, with the exception of a minority of armed officers.

ARVs were deployed officially for the first time in London in 1991. An "unpublicised" ARV was deployed in the Brixton area after the riots and was operational in the 1980s, code name Lima Delta 53. This had the standard Smith & Wesson revolvers and was on patrol at all times. Following their success, forces outside of the capital later formed similar units during the early to mid-1990s. The concept of an ARV was influenced by West Yorkshire Police's instant response cars, as used from 1976.

=== Firearms Access ===
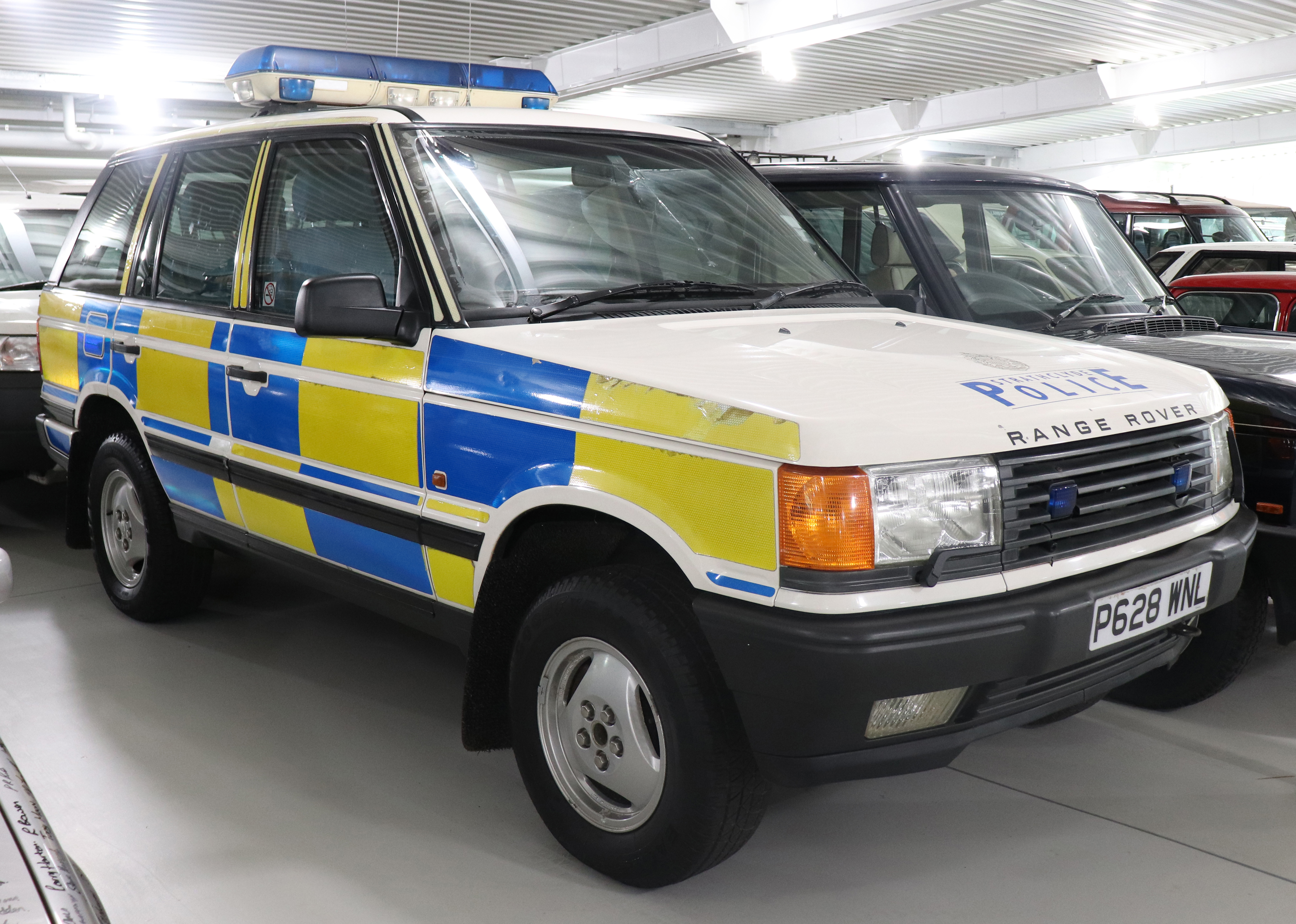
A Land Rover Range Rover once used as an ARV, now preserved at the British Motor Museum

Early ARVs contained a secure safe between the seats containing a .38 Smith & Wesson Model 10 for each member, with two 9mm Heckler & Koch MP5 semi-automatic carbines secured in the boot. After ARVs became established and the practice was accepted for widespread use, the Model 10 revolvers were replaced by the semi-automatic Glock 17 handgun chambered in 9×19mm. In 2010, the Heckler & Koch G36C 5.56mm carbine was introduced in case of a Mumbai style terrorist attack.

Revolvers and pistols could be removed from the secure safe by ARV members if, in a member's opinion, an immediate threat to life was posed. Authorisation for this from the control room was required, including contacting an officer of Association of Chief Police Officers (ACPO) rank. If a high-ranking officer was not available, a chief inspector could give authorisation in an emergency. Following an increase in the size of the firearms unit, Commissioner Sir Paul Condon issued regulations, effective 23 May 1994, that gave ARV crews standing authority to wear their handguns overtly and to deploy their weapons. Several police forces followed suit. The Greater Manchester police became one of those whose ARVs openly carried firearms beginning 6 September 1994.

In 2013, the inaugural chief constable of Police Scotland granted a standing authority for ARV crews to overtly wear handguns and to deploy their weapons when he introduced ARV patrols nationally.

== Identification ==
ARVs are visually identified by fellow officers from a yellow dot sticker and an asterisk on the roof for helicopters to identify them.

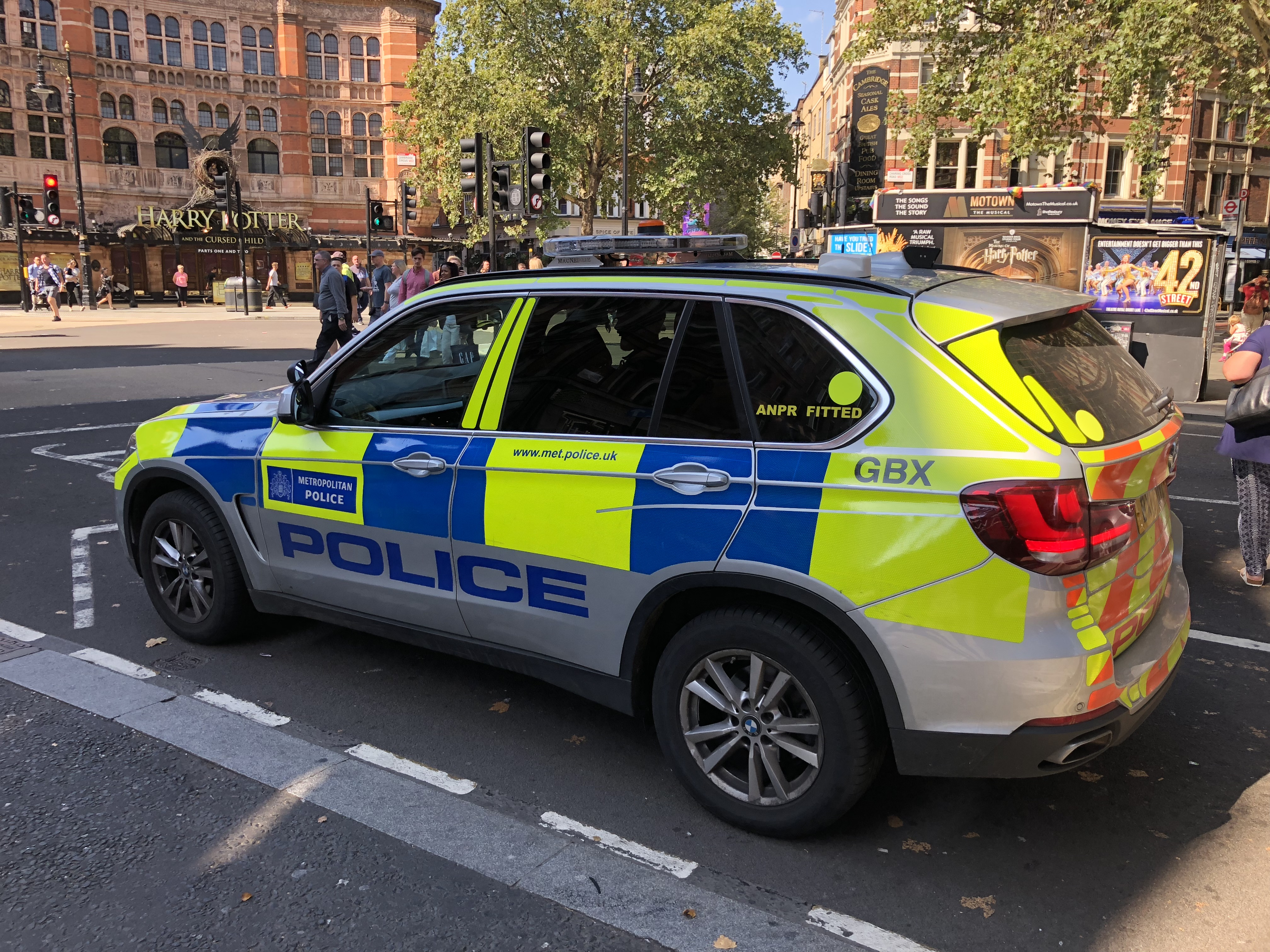
BMW X5 ARV

== See also ==
- Authorised firearms officer
- Firearms unit
