= Belfast International Airport Constabulary =

- Abbreviation: BIAC

Agency overview
- Legal personality: Privately held company

Jurisdictional structure
- Legal jurisdiction: Land owned by the Belfast International Airport
- Governing body: Belfast International Airport Authority
- Constituting instrument: Article 19(3), Airport (Northern Ireland) Order 1994
- General nature: Civilian police

Operational structure
- Headquarters: Airport Police Station, Airport Road, Aldergrove, BT29 4AB

Facilities
- Stations: 1

The Belfast International Airport Constabulary (BIAC) is a small, specialised police force responsible for providing policing to the Belfast International Airport in Aldergrove, Northern Ireland. Officers employed by the force are empowered to act as Constables in accordance with the Airport (Northern Ireland) Order 1994 whilst on land owned or controlled by the airport. The Belfast International Airport Constabulary is the last remaining privately funded airport police force in the United Kingdom, however airport forces still operate in the Republic of Ireland and the Isle of Man.

Officers of the Belfast International Airport Constabulary are employees of the airport authority. Like all police agencies operating in Northern Ireland, they are subject to oversight from the Police Ombudsman for Northern Ireland. Any serious incidents taking place at the airport are automatically passed to the local territorial police force, the Police Service of Northern Ireland.

== See also ==
- Airport policing in the United Kingdom
- List of law enforcement agencies in the United Kingdom, Crown Dependencies and British Overseas Territories
- Law enforcement in the United Kingdom
