= Police duty belt =

Belt used to carry equipment

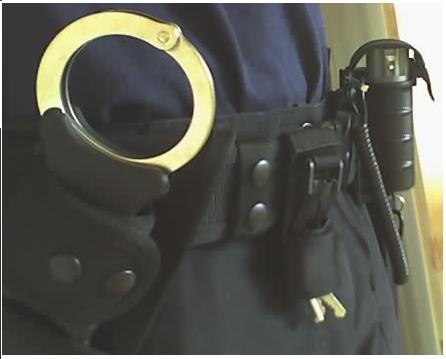
A police officer's duty belt, with Hiatts Speedcuffs, handcuff keys and CS spray visible.

A police duty belt (sometimes referred to as a gun belt, "duty rig" and/or kit belt) is a belt, typically constructed of nylon or leather used by police, prison and security officers to carry equipment easily in a series of pouches attached to the belt, in a readily-accessible manner, while leaving the hands free to interact. This belt can carry various items, including handcuffs and guns.

The duty belt came into use in the early 1900s, in lieu of carrying the required equipment in greatcoat pockets or additional bags. These early types were almost exclusively made of dark colored leather with simple pockets or clip systems attached, such as the Sam Browne belt. However, there are some issues with the use of a duty belt, with the large amount of equipment carried on modern duty belts often weighing more than 20 lbs (9 kg).

== History ==
Many police forces in the United Kingdom began with a uniform consisting of a swallow-tail coat and top hat. A pillbox or kepi hat along with a frock coat were introduced in the 1860s, along with helmets designed especially for protection against attack and the weather. Truncheons themselves had been introduced as early as 1764, however it was not until 1994 that police forces in the UK started to nationally standardize their uniform prompting the introduction of the duty belt to contain such equipment, instead of previously having their staff carry equipment in their handbags or adapted pockets. In the case of the earliest equipment carrying, a cutlass or firearm was usually clipped to the belt of the frock coat. In fact pockets themselves were not introduced until the early 1900s in some cases.

Before duty belts, British female officers carried their truncheons, which were shorter than the male version, in their handbags along with their police notebook as a matter of routine. Male officers carried handcuffs, whereas female officers were not permitted to without special permission. During the 1950s and 1960s, the Sam Browne belt was in popular use by police officers in the USA.

== Composition ==
=== Material ===
Most duty belts have a width of 2 1/4 inches and are either made of ballistic nylon or leather. Many Canadian police departments have had officers complain of having back pain due to their supposedly rigid leather belts. In response, many Canadian departments are now switching to nylon belts because they are considered by some to be more flexible. The Service de Police de la Ville de Montréal (SPVM), the second largest municipal police service in Canada, gave a contract to a consulting firm in order to find more ergonomic solutions.

In Australia, instead of belts the WA Police are trending towards wearing vests with more equipment in them than belts due to back problems, and maneuverability. Older belts used to fail under the weight of whatever was carried; recently, manufacturers have introduced double-ply belts which retain their shape and can withstand the weight of the equipment.

Nylon duty gear is generally less expensive, lighter, and easier to maintain than leather gear of comparable quality. However, leather gear is generally regarded as having a more traditional and professional appearance. To combine the best of both materials, companies like Bianchi manufacture nylon duty gear that has the appearance of leather.

=== Color ===
The most common color for duty belts in service with law enforcement personnel and security officers is black; however, there is some variation. In some instances, brown leather is used in place of black, which is generally only chosen for cosmetic purposes — usually because it is more suited to the color scheme of the officers' uniforms.

== Application ==
Duty belts wrap around the officer's waist and fasten with a buckle at the front. This is often protected by a velcro cover to prevent release of the belt by anyone other than the officer.

=== Belt keepers ===
In the past, many belts would sag and move around while around the waist while an officer was engaging in a physical activity. Belt keepers wrap around the duty belt and trouser belt, ensuring that the belt stays in place, even when the officer is taking something from the belt or engaging in an altercation with a suspect.

=== Belt suspenders ===
A three-way buckle.

Belt suspenders allow the wearer to move a portion of the weight of the belt onto the shoulders, reducing the weight imposed on the lower back. This also means that the belt does not have to be worn as tightly, cutting down on pressure exerted on the stomach and waist area. However, there are also safety concerns over suspenders, as they can be used against the officer in the event of a struggle, but newer versions such as break off act like a clip-on tie when pulled, reducing the risk of any injury to the officer.

=== Fasteners ===
Traditionally, belts have been fastened using a metal buckle; however, this type is changing for a number of reasons. Now plastic buckles are more common, and many incorporate a three-way buckle system for added security. An example of this is the 'Coplock' system, which requires the wearer to depress a third release catch before the buckles may be separated; this is to decrease the chance of the belt being released by anyone but its wearer.

Plastic buckles are often favored over the traditional metal versions, because when in use it is much easier to adjust the length of the belt to suit the officers' natural curves, whereas with the metal belt buckles it was only possible to have the belt at pre-set lengths, determined by the position of the holes in the belt, therefore making it difficult to suit an officer personally.

== Equipment ==
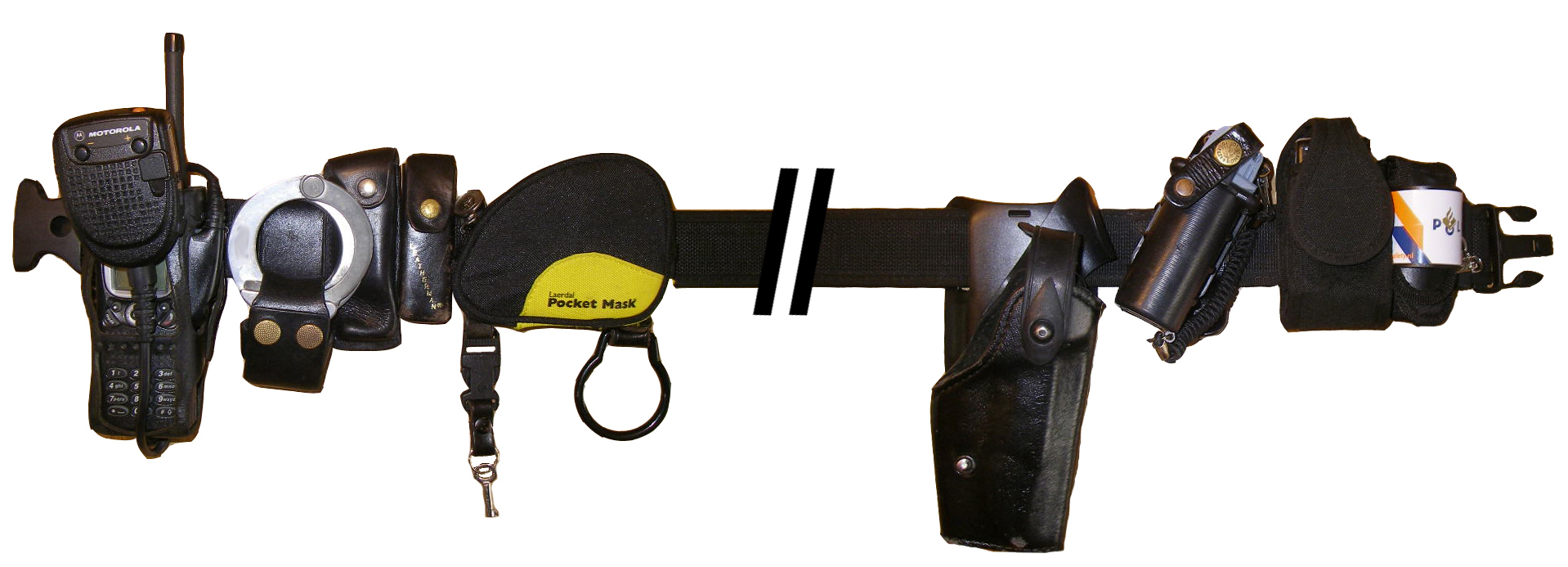
The duty belt of a police officer.

Equipment commonly carried on the belt includes: handcuff, radios, baton, hand-held protection devices such as pepper spray, firearms and ammunition, taser, flashlights, batteries, gloves, pens, pencils, keys, multi-tool, window punch etc. The equipment carried largely differs from country to country, and between areas in the same country not only because of choice but natural hazards — e.g. pepper spray would freeze in very cold climates. In some countries officers carry a knife.

=== Handgun holster ===
A handgun holster securely holds the officer's firearm. It has between one and three locking points to keep the gun in place and may have a cord attached to the firearm to prevent theft of the weapon.

=== Radio pouch ===
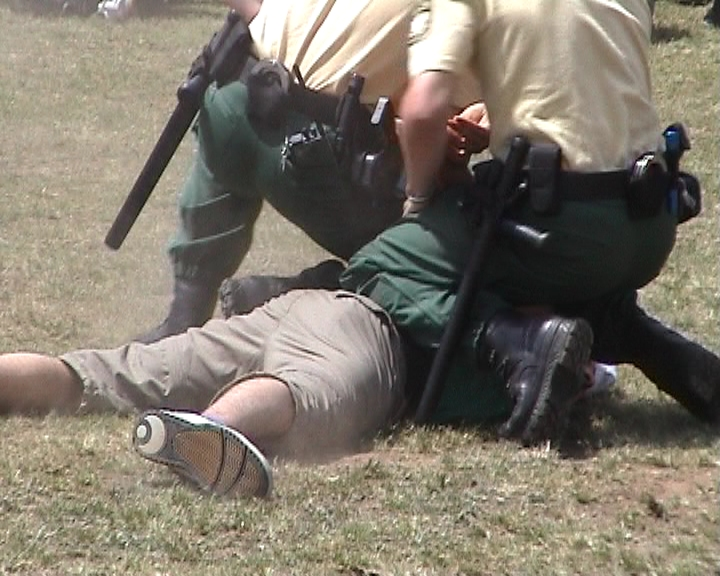
German policemen subdue an offender. Both officers have nightsticks, sidearms, handcuffs and radios clipped onto their duty belts.

The radio pouch securely holds the officer's portable personal radio or handheld transceiver (HT).

There are 2 popular radio pouch designs. The first consists of an L-shaped bar which the radio rests on, and is secured by a loop around the middle of the radio.

The second is a two-piece design consisting of a radio pouch and a swivel. The radio is held in the pouch by a loop over the top, then the pouch is attached to the belt by a swivel. This design allows the radio to be easily removed from the belt for handheld use.

Often, an external speaker microphone is attached to the radio, usually clipped to the officer's uniform shirt.

Recently, in-ear monitoring has become more common, with a smaller lapel microphone clipped to the shirt. This in-ear system supplements or replaces the older lapel microphone. A 'Push to Talk' button is usually located at the radio, or extended to a separate switch located elsewhere on the officer.

=== Handcuffs ===
==== Chain link or hinged ====
Handcuffs are commonly carried at many different locations on the belt, and using a variety of pouches, such as open and closed top holders and handcuff loops.

Recently, concerns have been aired that carrying handcuffs on the back of the belt may be unsafe, due to the pressure exerted on the small of the back by the cuffs and case, while seated. Although this may not be a problem for beat officers, who patrol an area on foot, this can cause severe problems in vehicle-based 'response' officers. Over time, the handcuff case may cause a rupture in the L-5 disc of the back, and cause pinching of the Sciatic nerve — thus numbing the officer's left leg, severely affecting his or her running ability.

Some officers choose to carry their handcuffs in the small of back position, but do not utilize a handcuff case, meaning that one side of the handcuffs is pushed between the officer's belt and trousers (or simply tucked into his or her trousers), and the other side is allowed to hang loose on the outside. This method is often utilized by plain clothes officers who do not wear a belt of any sort, and therefore are unable to use a proper handcuff case.

Modern British police officers who carry handcuffs openly have an adapted holder designed to accommodate the cuffs at an angle, with a speed release mechanism.

==== Rigid ====
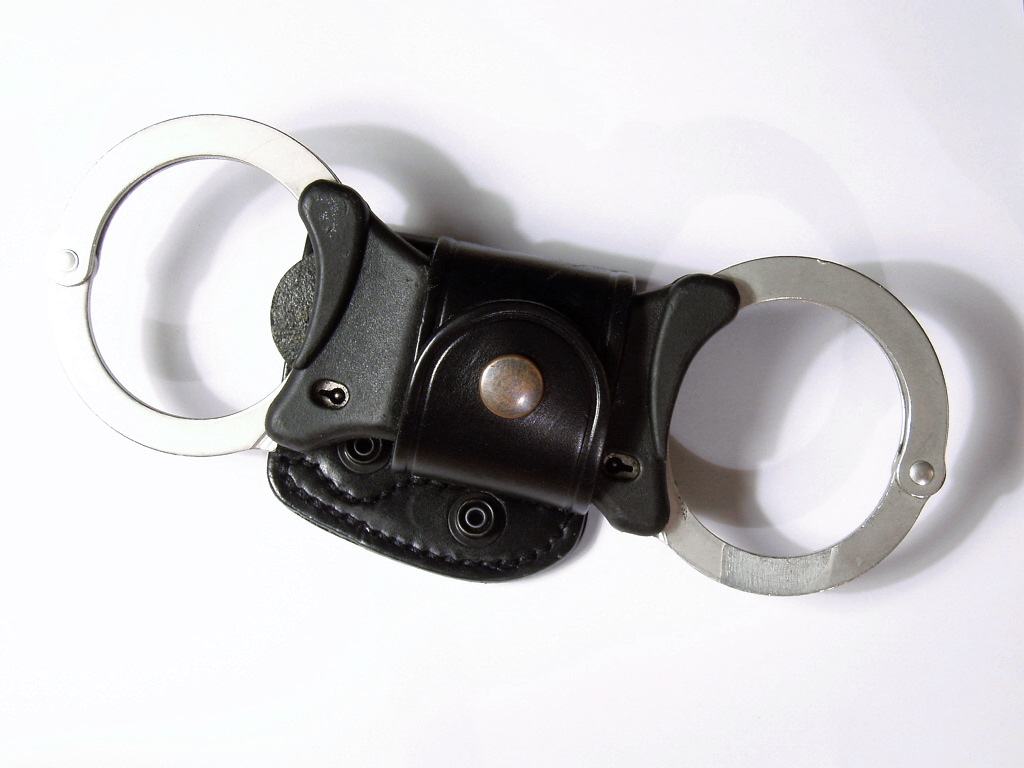
Speedcuffs with a plastic grip fitted to allow easy manipulation and storage on a duty belt

Because of the rigid bar in this type of handcuffs, these tend to occupy more space on a belt whereas the chain link could be folded; the rigid type decreases the number of possible wearing positions. Typically, the cuffs are worn in a specially designed holster at a 45° angle, on either the left or right side of the officer, depending on whether they are left- or right-handed. These types of handcuffs are known as speedcuffs or quickcuffs, as the rigid bar design allows the officer to easily control the suspect and a much quicker placement on the wrist of the offender. Rigid handcuffs are most popular in the UK.

==== Others ====
Some officers supplement their standard handcuffs with disposable restraints ('zip ties'), such as the ASP Tri-Fold (TM) restraints, which can be carried in a pocket or in a specialized pouch on the belt.

=== Chemical sprays (aka pepper spray or mace) ===
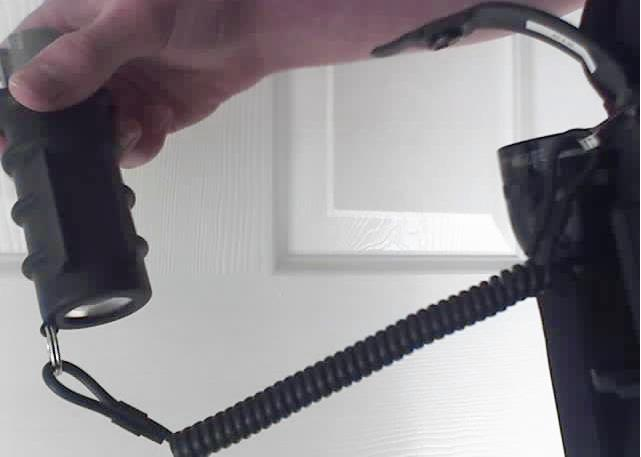
Detachable CS spray holder.

Aerosol chemical irritants are also commonly carried by police officers. The four most common formulations are: OC, CS, CN tear gas, or PAVA Spray. They are referred to as control sprays, pepper spray or mace.

One method of carrying these is in a detachable holder, attached to the wearer by a belt loop and a lanyard. This provides the officer with both an easy, fast method of bringing their spray in a position for use against a suspect and also a secure way of carrying it, as the lanyard means that it is always within reach of the officer, and they have a method of drawing it back should it fall.

Another method of carriage that is used, and is more basic, is to simply contain the canister in a pouch, secured by either a velcro or button fastener. For the canister to be ready for operational use, most pouches of this type contain a coiled spring at the bottom bringing the canister into reach above the neck of the pouch when the cover is undone.

Some officers who carry a taser did not carry OC in the past, due to concerns of safety (ignition of the propellant) and limited belt space; the taser and OC are often considered to be approximately the same level of force. This has largely changed in the US, as the Taser is more effective, and the OC sprays are now nonflammable.

=== Taser ===
The taser is normally carried in a one- or no-point locking holster slanted across the front of the officer's duty belt.

=== Portable lighting ===
==== Primary flashlights ====
Law enforcement and security officers often have a large and powerful flashlight for duty use which is often carried on the belt, with an even more powerful one in the car. These lights are usually rechargeable and stay on the charger when not in use.

Long, cylindrical flashlights tend to be carried in a flashlight ring. Rings are simple and inexpensive, and are convenient for flashlights which are not regularly carried. However, the flashlight—which is often heavy—is permitted a great amount of vertical and horizontal freedom which can make the light insecure and uncomfortable to carry.

Examples of popular primary flashlights:

- Maglite Instrument MagCharger
- Streamlight SL20XP-LED
- Surefire 10X Dominator
- Pelican 8060 LED
- UTG handheld

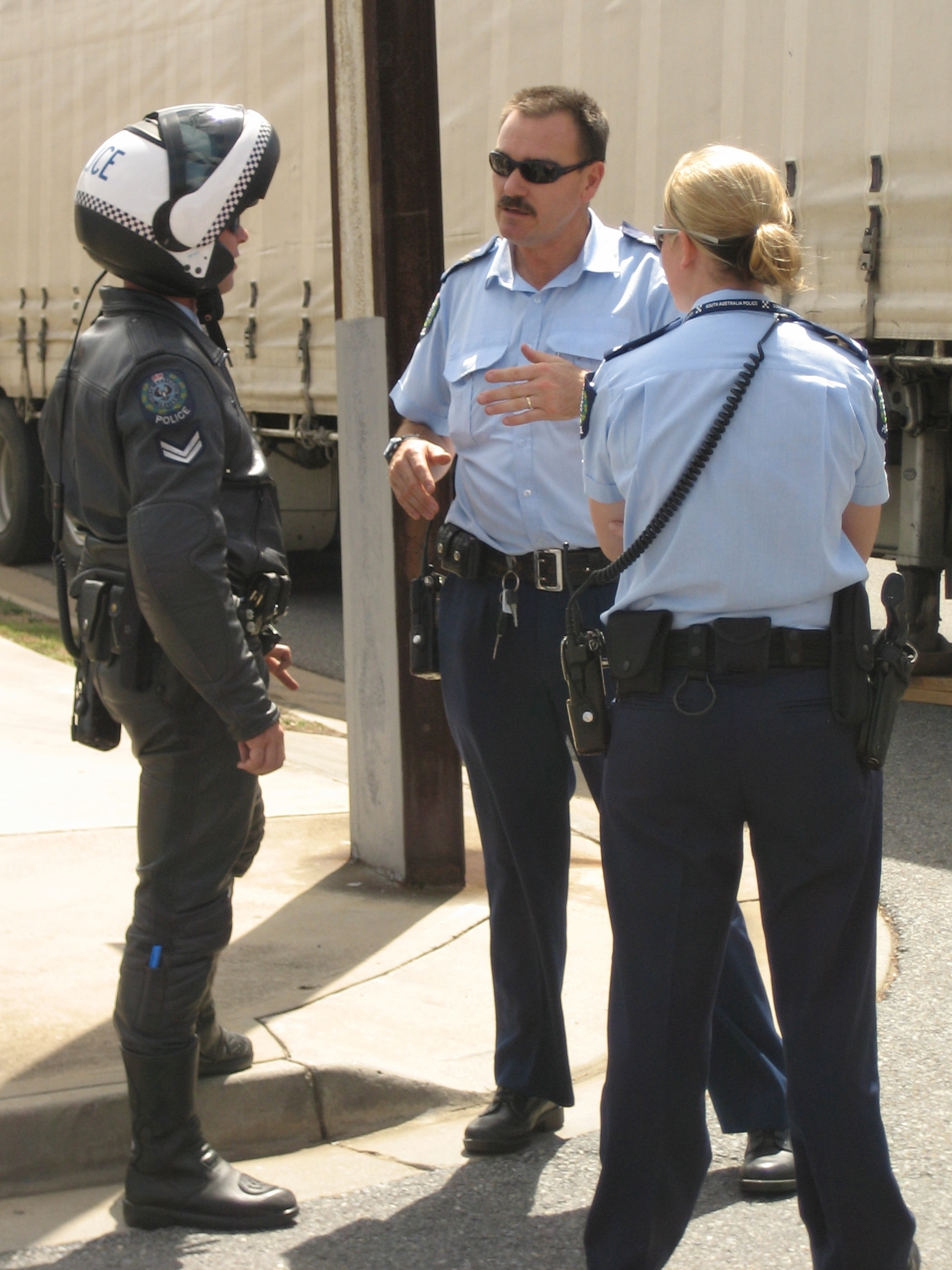
South Australian Police officers in February 2006 wearing duty belts.

==== Secondary flashlights ====
Because of the size and weight of most primary lights, and sometimes agency policy, many officers choose to carry a smaller secondary flashlight for everyday tasks. These lights are usually rechargeable and are kept in a holder on the duty belt.

Examples of popular secondary lights:

- Streamlight Stinger / Polystinger
- Pelican 7060 LED
- SureFire G2/G3
- SureFire 8AX/8NX Commander
- Niton Tactical L.E. Professional Range
- Blackhawk Nite-Ops Gladius
- LED Lenser P7/T7

==== Auxiliary flashlights ====
Rechargeable flashlights have been known to fail at inappropriate times. Because of this, many officers carry additional non-rechargeable flashlights. These lights must be small, light, bright and absolutely dependable. These lights may be kept in a holder on the belt, or in a trouser pocket.

These flashlights often use CR123 3.0 volt lithium or alkaline 1.5 volt AA battery cells.

Examples of popular auxiliary lights:

- Surefire E1B Back-Up

==== Weapon lights ====
To allow for better weapon control, officers often attach a dedicated flashlight directly to the firearm. These lights tend to be especially small, light, robust, and use non-rechargeable batteries.

They sometimes have special features available, such as laser emitters.

Examples of popular weapon lights:

- Surefire X300/X400 series
- Streamlight TLR series
- Blackhawk Night-Ops Xiphos
- Surefire 618/918 shotgun fore-end family

==== Special purpose lights ====
Some equipment has built-in lighting to better enable the officer to perform a task without having to use an additional light. For example, the Streamlight Cuffmate has integrated LEDs so that the officer can see keyholes on his handcuffs when restraining a suspect in darkness.

=== Magazine pouch ===
Spare magazines or speedloaders are carried to reload a gun. Magazines may be carried in a vertical position, or in a horizontal position. The advantage of carriage in a vertical, upright position is that the magazine occupies less space on the belt and therefore more magazines can be carried. The advantage of horizontal carry is that greater comfort is provided, and magazines are in a position that makes it easier for an officer to retrieve and load them into the handgun.

There is also variation in the number of magazines a pouch holds. The norm is for two magazines to be carried, but there are also variants which allow for carriage of more, or less, dependent on the needs of the officer. Also, similar to holders of other items of equipment, these can be found with either an open top design, or a closed design fastened either with a press stud or velcro.

Other pouches hold a single magazine but are attached to the front of the officer's firearm holster.

=== Baton holder ===
There are several types of baton holders for officers who have fixed or collapsible batons. For fixed straight and side-handle batons, they use a ring which keeps the baton in place, but can slide out when the officer is running or engaging in an altercation with an offender, and a fixed baton usually has to be removed before the officer can sit in their patrol vehicle.

In the UK, where the police are not generally equipped with firearms, they use a cross-draw holster for their extendable batons, which is on the opposite side of their strong hand, facing forward. When an officer needs to draw the device from a cross-draw baton holster, they would be required to reach across their front to the other side of the belt, where the baton is, undo a thumbsnap (these baton holders have open tops, but are considered secure) and pull the baton out of the pouch. These holders also allow the baton to be stored while extended to allow the officer to arrest a suspect without the officer having to drop their baton or collapse it, which could take time and allowing the suspect to stage a counterattack or escape.

Elsewhere, officers can choose to have a closed baton pouch or an open top baton pouch for their extendable batons. Open top baton pouches are considered by some officers to be a safety concern as there is no thumbsnap to undo, as an officer may be unaware of the baton being taken from him or falling out when moving.

=== Key holder ===
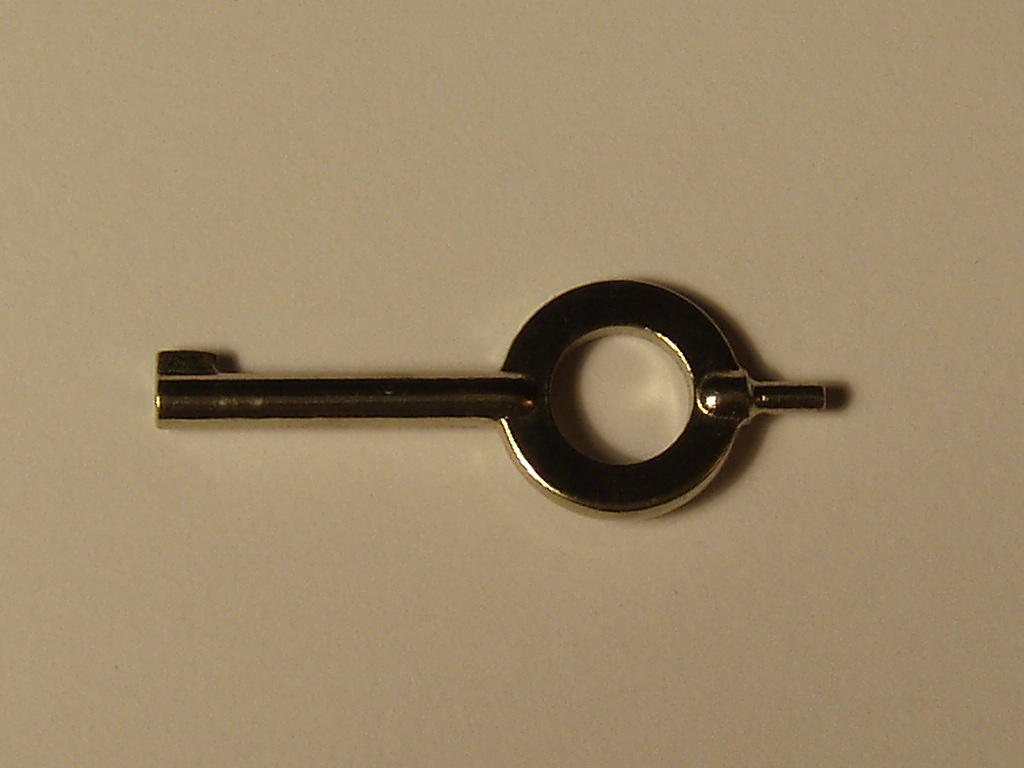
Universal handcuff key

Noise reduction is a major issue for an officer who may have to silently stalk a suspect. A 'silent' key keeper uses a velcro pad to prevent noise. Other types of key holders include models which work in the same way as a tape-measure, automatically retracting keys after use. A hidden key keeper, which is concealed in a belt, is mostly used for the storage of spare sets of handcuff keys.

=== Disposable gloves ===
Either nitrile or latex disposable gloves are useful when handling subjects that may have infectious diseases when rendering First aid or making an arrest. Another use is to protect evidence at a crime scene. Numerous companies manufacture dedicated pouches designed specifically to hold disposable gloves, as well as multi-purpose pouches that can hold either pagers, disposable gloves, or any other such small objects that will fit within the pouch. An officer who does not have sufficient room on their belt for a dedicated glove pouch will often simply carry a pair of gloves in their trouser pocket.

=== Knife pouch ===
It is often necessary for police officers to carry either a knife, or a multi-tool. The former is not just used as a self-defense weapon, but also as a utility tool for the cutting of various objects — such as, for example, a car seat belt which an officer may have to quickly cut in order to remove an injured person from a motor vehicle.

A multi-tool can be used in a number of different situations, depending on its specific design. It may be used as a knife, and may also be used in the assembly or disassembly of various items in the field, to facilitate their repair. It also has a limited use as a method of entry tool. Officers may also choose to carry a window-punch which is a small metal point on the end of a hammer-type handle, which the officer can use to break a window either to access a car or a residence.

=== First aid kit ===
Since police officers may be the first to arrive at a medical incident, officers may wear a first aid pouch containing some basic life saving equipment, which is useful while waiting for an ambulance to arrive. This equipment may include: medical gloves, CPR mask and antiseptic wipes. It is not common practice for American police officers to carry first-aid equipment beyond examination gloves on their duty belt, but they usually keep such equipment in their nearby patrol car. More expensive equipment, such as Automatic External Defibrillators, may be assigned to a few patrol cars.

== Country-specific equipment ==
=== British police ===
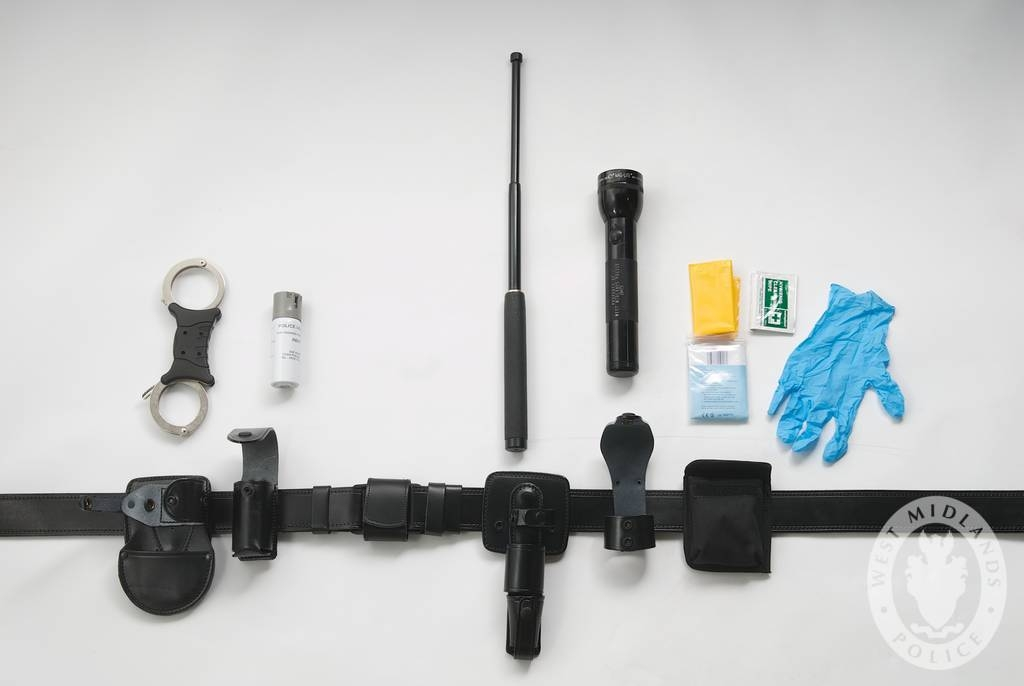
A duty belt of West Midlands Police.

Unlike most other police forces, officers in British forces are not generally equipped with firearms. The standard equipment for officers of the British police includes Hiatts handcuffs, an Airwaves radio, PAVA spray and ASP baton. Taser-trained officers also carry their X26 or X2 taser on the belt, and all officers may also wear optional pouches containing first-aid items or documentation. British police officers, and those of the Hong Kong Police Force, can also carry their warrant cards on their belts, although it is not a widespread use.

Firearms trained officers may carry their sidearm on a belt, however drop-leg holsters are the norm. Officers of the Police Service of Northern Ireland, one of the small number of routinely armed forces, typically carry their sidearms and magazines on their duty belt.

=== HM Prison Service ===
Prison officers in British prisons are equipped with a duty belt to assist them in their job. On their belt they carry various pouches for the prison security keys, radio pouch, baton holster, Pava spray and rigid bar handcuffs.

== Concerns and remedies ==
American police officers often carry more than 20 lbs. (9 kg) of equipment. Many police officers develop health conditions, such as chronic back problems, as a result of this. Officers with back problems sometimes use suspenders, which transfer some of the belt's weight to the shoulders, reducing the amount of weight concentrated at the waist.

Some officers are also switching to harnesses. This harness goes over their stab vest or ballistic vest and reduces the need for officers to keep reaching around to get their equipment. Some officers have even stored their equipment in pockets of their coats or trousers, however this is not recommended if an officer needs to reach for the equipment quickly.

== See also ==
- Handgun holster
- Sam Browne belt
