= T.Rex Arms =

American manufacturer of firearm accessories and tactical equipment

T.Rex Arms (stylized as T.REX ARMS) is an American manufacturer of firearm accessories and tactical equipment based in Centerville, Tennessee. It was founded in 2013 by Lucas Botkin, who started the business by making Kydex holsters in his garage with an initial budget of about $1,000. T.Rex Arms is best known for its concealed-carry holsters and related gear for civilian and professional shooters. The company also produces educational media on firearms training, and its fast-paced instructional videos have attracted a large online following, and has been described as being at the "forefront" of the so-called "GunTube" with over 1.5 million YouTube subscribers. The company has been associated with hardline Christian beliefs and right-wing extremism.

== History ==
Lucas Botkin founded T.Rex Arms in 2013 at the age of 20, despite having no military or law-enforcement background. Botkin handcrafted holsters using simple tools (including a toaster oven to mold Kydex plastic) and gradually improved his designs, eventually resulting in the fledgling company's first major product, the Sidecar holster. Introduced around 2015, the Sidecar was an appendix carry holster that holds a handgun and a spare magazine as a single unit. At the time, the Sidecar's one-piece design was novel and quickly gained popularity; however because T.Rex Arms failed to patent the design, it was soon emulated by other holster makers across the industry. The commercial success of the Sidecar holster propelled T.Rex Arms’ growth and the company expanded its product lineup to include other Kydex holster models (such as the Raptor and Ragnarok holsters) as well as rifle magazine pouches, slings, and related accessories, as well as retailing a curated selection of third-party products (like weapon lights, optics, and medical gear) that it had evaluated in-house.

In late 2020, T.Rex Arms introduced its first plate carrier called the AC1. The AC1 is a minimalist ballistic plate carrier designed to scale from low-profile civilian use to a moderate-duty loadout, aligning with the company's focus on armed citizens rather than military contracts. T.Rex Arms continued to broaden its offerings of nylon gear into the early 2020s, including chest rigs and pouches to complement its holster products. In August 2021, the company released a second-generation update to its flagship holster, known as the Sidecar 2.0. The new Sidecar introduced a modular “Spine System,” a flexible hinge connecting the holster and attachments, allowing the rig to bend with the wearer's movement while maintaining a single-plane profile for concealment. Notably, T.Rex Arms made the Spine hinge design open-source: it published the CAD drawings and 3D models of the Spine system and invited other manufacturers to create compatible attachments for the Sidecar platform. This decision to openly share the holster's interface was intended to foster industry collaboration and has been cited as an unusual move in the competitive tactical gear market.

In now-deleted posts, Lucas Botkin has claimed that T.Rex Arms offers drills and training to law enforcement and the military, though an investigation by Mother Jones found no evidence to back these claims. The investigation confirmed that local governments have purchased equipment such as batteries and uniforms from the company.

=== 2025 Lucas Botkin departure ===
Lucas Botkin announced his resignation from the company on May 31, 2025, via a personal social media post. In his statement, Botkin described the decision as “not made lightly but necessary,” citing a need to protect his family and stay true to his personal values. Subsequent explanations revealed that an internal conflict precipitated the split: Botkin alleged that a T.Rex Arms employee had sent inappropriate content to Botkin's wife, and that the rest of the leadership team responded inadequately to this incident. Feeling that the situation was mishandled, Botkin chose to fully cut ties with the company he had founded. The departure received major attention throughout the firearm enthusiast community, with many customers and industry influencers reacting with support for Botkin and criticism of T.Rex Arms’ remaining management. Popular firearms influencers including "MrGunsnGear" and "Garand Thumb" publicly sided with Botkin, and some fans called for boycotting T.Rex Arms. In the wake of the controversy, another longtime employee and content creator, Brantley Merriam, also resigned from T.Rex Arms, with reports suggesting that internal disagreements over the company's direction had been simmering for months prior to these events. Botkin indicated that he would be pursuing new business ventures after his exit. The company's public response to the controversy was limited to addressing major claims, and expressed gratitude for Botkin's contributions.

== Media presence ==
By 2023, T.Rex Arms had grown into a multi-million dollar enterprise with a growing social media presence. According to Digital Forensic Research Lab extremist influencer monitors Meghan Conroy and Max Rizzuto, the company demonstrated a “masterful ability” of creating a wide array of conservative political content, including imagery of America "in decay, and how like-minded, God-oriented people can save it," references to the end times and calls for their viewers to "seize control before things get worse". According to one industry review, the company has had “an undeniable cultural impact in proliferating the concept of a highly trained civilian populace” in the United States.
