= IPK (disambiguation) =

IPK may refer to:

- International Prototype of the Kilogram, an object that was used to define the kilogram
- IPK Acrylic-polyvinyl chloride, a plastic material
- Inositol polyphosphate kinase, a family of enzymes
- Iñupiaq language of Alaska and Northwest Territories (ISO 639-3 code: ipk)
- Iisalmen Peli-Karhut, an ice hockey team in Finland
