= Paddle holster =

Type of handgun holster

A paddle holster is a holster for a handgun whose method of securing the holster to the wearer utilizes a flat, concave shaped piece of plastic or stiffened leather designed to be worn against the body inside of the pants. The broad surface area of the "paddle" and the material from which it is made use friction to prevent the holster from being pulled up and away when the handgun is drawn.

== Advantages and disadvantages ==
The primary benefit of this style of holster is that the entire holster and firearm may be removed from the wearer easily. Firearm wearers such as plainclothes detectives who frequently need to move between vehicles, offices, and field work may employ paddle holsters as they allow them to conveniently remove the holster and firearm when sitting and then just as easily replace it when needed. A typical handgun holster that attaches to the user via a belt does not offer the same flexibility requiring the user to remove his/her belt in order to remove the holster. This lack of dependence on a belt allows users the option of not even wearing a belt and still using a paddle holster.

One disadvantage of the paddle holster is that its physical security is not as great as a holster secured with a belt as the paddle holster relies on the friction of the "paddle" to keep it in place. A second disadvantage is that paddle holsters tend to be larger in size which reduces the ability to conceal them easily.

== Options ==
Options for the holster material are as varied as for any other holster and include plastic, nylon, and leather. Retention of the handgun in a paddle holster uses similar methods to other holsters such as adjustable tension devices and thumb break straps. Some paddle holsters have adjustable cant and tilt allowing the "paddle" to remain upright and shaped to the hip while the angle of the draw can be adjusted to suit the user's preference. Typically, the paddle holster has a "duck-bill" spring clip that slides over the wearer's belt, or belt and pants together, to help secure the holster to the wearer.

Many people who carry a gun for a living use a Safariland holster. They're often the first to the market with the new standard for law enforcement. The company's still popular SLS made its debut in the 1990s, the ALS system followed, and now the GLS, or Grip Locking System, is raising the bar yet again. GLS (Grip Lock System) secures weapon once holstered; the retention device is de-activated by the middle finger upon a standard shooting grip.
