= IPK Acrylic-polyvinyl chloride =

IPK Acrylic-polyvinyl chloride (IPK, IPK Acrylic PVC, IPK Thermoformable Sheet, IPK Kydex) is a line of thermoplastic acrylic-polyvinyl chloride composite material. It has a chemical structure similar to Kydex with an acrylic-polyvinyl chloride substrate and white cap for screen printing onto the material.

Kydex sheet was originally produced in 1965 by Rohm and Haas, having been designed for use in aircraft interiors. In recent years, Kydex has gained a hobbyist following for a wide variety of applications, including firearm holsters and sheaths for knives.

IPK Acrylic-polyvinyl chloride was developed by Interstate Plastics in 2012 and sold under the registered trademark IPK. Interstate Plastics claims the material offers an alternative to thermoformable plastic sheets while providing a printable surface for custom designs and patterns. Most vinyl sign print shops are able to print custom designs or patterns onto the material. IPK is currently the only thermoforming sheet on the market sold with a printable cap.

== Characteristics ==
IPK is an acrylic-polyvinyl chloride composite engineered for thermoforming applications, combining properties of both acrylic and polyvinyl chloride plastics. Acrylic adds rigidity and formability, while polyvinyl chloride, more commonly known as PVC, adds toughness and chemical resistance. Standard sheet thickness is .080 and IPK Acrylic-polyvinyl chloride can be thermoformed, post formed, brake formed and laminated.

== Applications ==
Applications range from gun holsters, knife sheaths, and medical equipment housings to aircraft trays, tables, and fixtures. IPK is very easy to clean: tough stains, scuffs, and graffiti can be removed with no staining or surface damage to the material. IPK is commonly used for thermoforming custom sized knife sheaths, gun holsters, and cell phone/tablet covers.

=== Common application ===
IPK is primarily used by hobbyists in thermoforming firearm holsters and sheaths for knives. The printable surface allows for custom printed patterns, allowing added customization for gun and knife enthusiasts.

- Firearm holsters
- Knife sheaths
- Equipment housings
- Instrument consoles
- Springs and tensioners

=== Leather substitute ===
In many applications, especially in holster and sheath applications, IPK is used as replacement for leather. The texture of IPK is more rigid than leather, and similar in touch. IPK thermoformable sheet in comparable to leather with the following properties:

- Waterproof
- Scratch resistant (Rockwell "R" hardness of 90+)
- Rigid and holds shape
- Does not stretch or shrink under normal conditions
- Low friction

=== Other applications ===
IPK can be used as a substitute in place of Kydex in the following applications:

- Truck cargo liners
- Lavatory pans
- Door liners
- Kick plates
- Seat backs
- Aircraft pull-down trays
- Truck fenders
- Trays and tote boxes
- Motor covers
- Safety helmets
- Aircraft fairings
- Air exhaust systems
- Rapid prototyping of systems
- Custom insulators for electronic equipment
- Clean rooms
- Telescope tubes
