= Handgun holster =

Device for the secure placement of a handgun on one's person

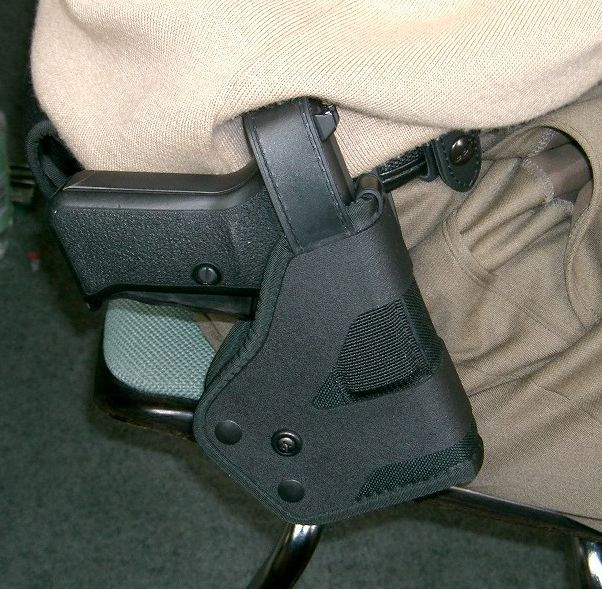
An H&K P7 pistol in a holster

A handgun holster is a device used to hold or restrict the undesired movement of a handgun, most commonly in a location where it can be easily withdrawn for immediate use. Holsters are often attached to a belt or waistband, but they may be attached to other locations of the body (e.g., the ankle holster). Holsters vary in the degree to which they secure or protect the firearm. Some holsters for law enforcement officers have a strap over the top of the holster to make the handgun less likely to fall out of the holster or harder for another person to grab the gun. Some holsters have a flap over the top to protect the gun from the elements.

== Function ==
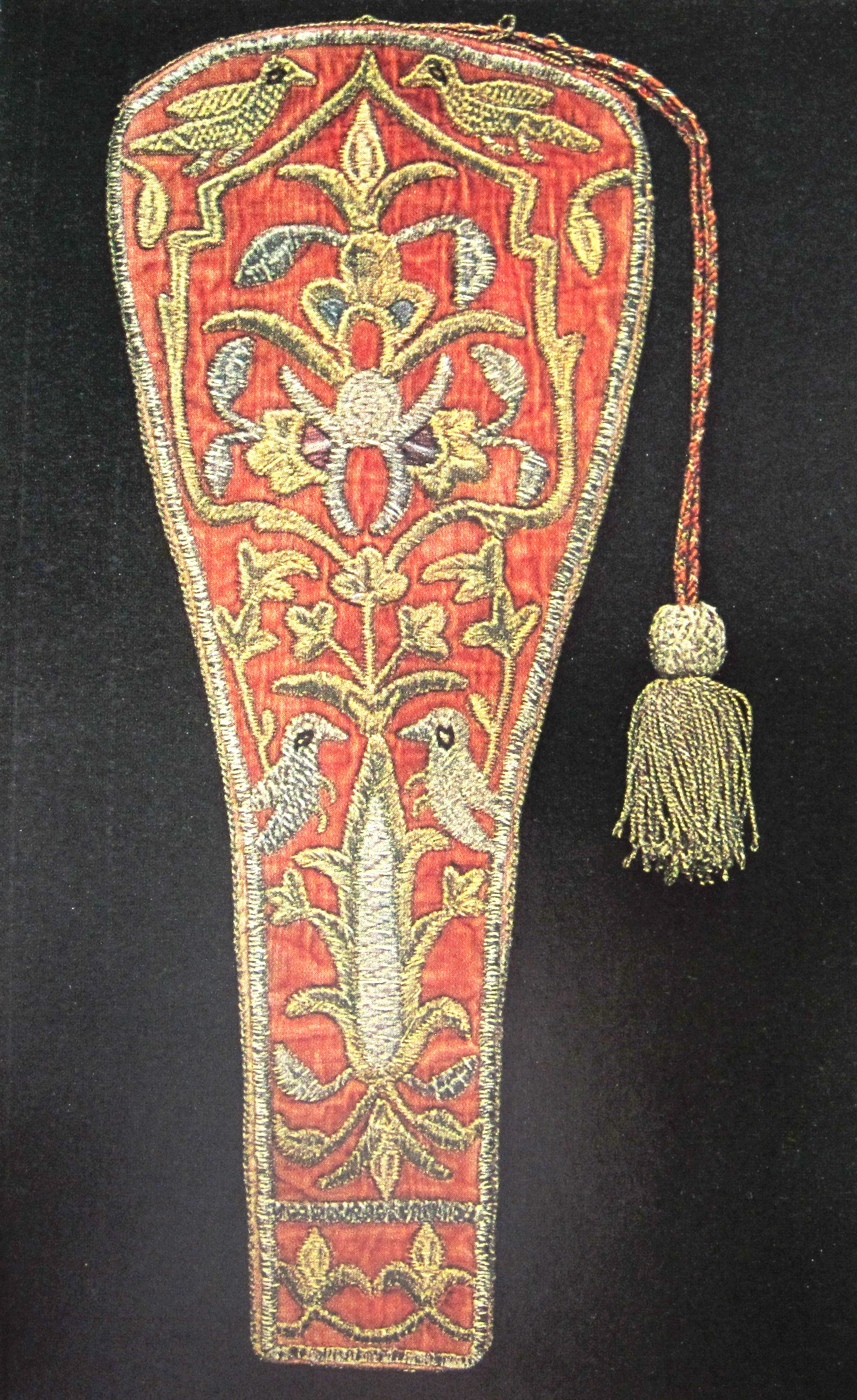
16th-century pistol holster from Tbilisi, Georgia

Holsters are generally designed to offer protection to the handgun, secure its retention, and provide ready access to it. The need for ready access is often at odds with the need for security and protection, so users must consider their needs. Choosing the right balance of security and availability can be very important, especially in the case of a defensive weapon holster, where failure to access the weapon quickly or damage or loss of the weapon due to insufficient retention or protection could leave the user inadequately defended.

One of the most important functions of a holster is trigger coverage. Many choose to carry a firearm with a round in the chamber so that it is immediately available to use. Although some gun users believe this to be dangerous, practically all modern handguns are designed to be carried this way, with safety features that are designed to prevent the weapon from discharging unless the trigger is pulled. The use of a holster that blocks access to the trigger effectively mitigates this risk. Holsters specifically designed for the model of firearm tend to perform best in this respect. Likewise, those constructed of more rigid materials better prevent manipulation of the trigger when holstered.

Holsters are generally designed to be used with one hand, allowing the handgun to be removed and replaced with the same hand. To be able to return the handgun to its holster one-handed, the holster must be made from stiff material that holds its shape so that the holster will not collapse when the object is no longer inside to give it support.

Holsters are generally attached to a person's belt or waistband or clipped to another article of clothing. Some holsters, such as ankle holsters, have integrated support. Other holsters may fit inside a pocket, to add stability and protection to the handgun, keeping it more reliably secure and accessible than if it were in the pocket alone.

Holsters are generally worn in a location where they can be readily accessible. Common locations are: at the waist (outside (OWB) or inside (IWB) the waistband), behind the back (small of back (SOB), at the ankle, at the chest (in an elastic belly band or shoulder holster), or on the upper thigh. Holsters are sometimes contained in an external bag, such as a purse or fanny pack.

== Materials ==
Since holsters are typically made from fairly stiff yet tough materials, there are a limited number of common choices. The traditional material is leather. It has an attractive appearance and can be dyed in many colors or embossed with elaborate, purely decorative designs.

Ballistic nylon is another common fabric for holsters, as it is stiff, wear resistant, and thick enough to provide protection from gun shots and bullets.

Molded plastics, such as Kydex, are also popular, due to their low cost and robustness.

== Common types and styles ==
Holster designs for firearms cover a wide range of shapes, materials, and retention/release mechanisms, from simple leather pouches hanging from a belt to highly protective holsters with flaps that cover the entire handgun, to highly adjustable competition holsters that hold the handgun at a precise position and release instantly when activated. The wide range of types indicates the highly varied circumstances in which holsters are used, and the varying preferences of the users.

=== Categories by use ===
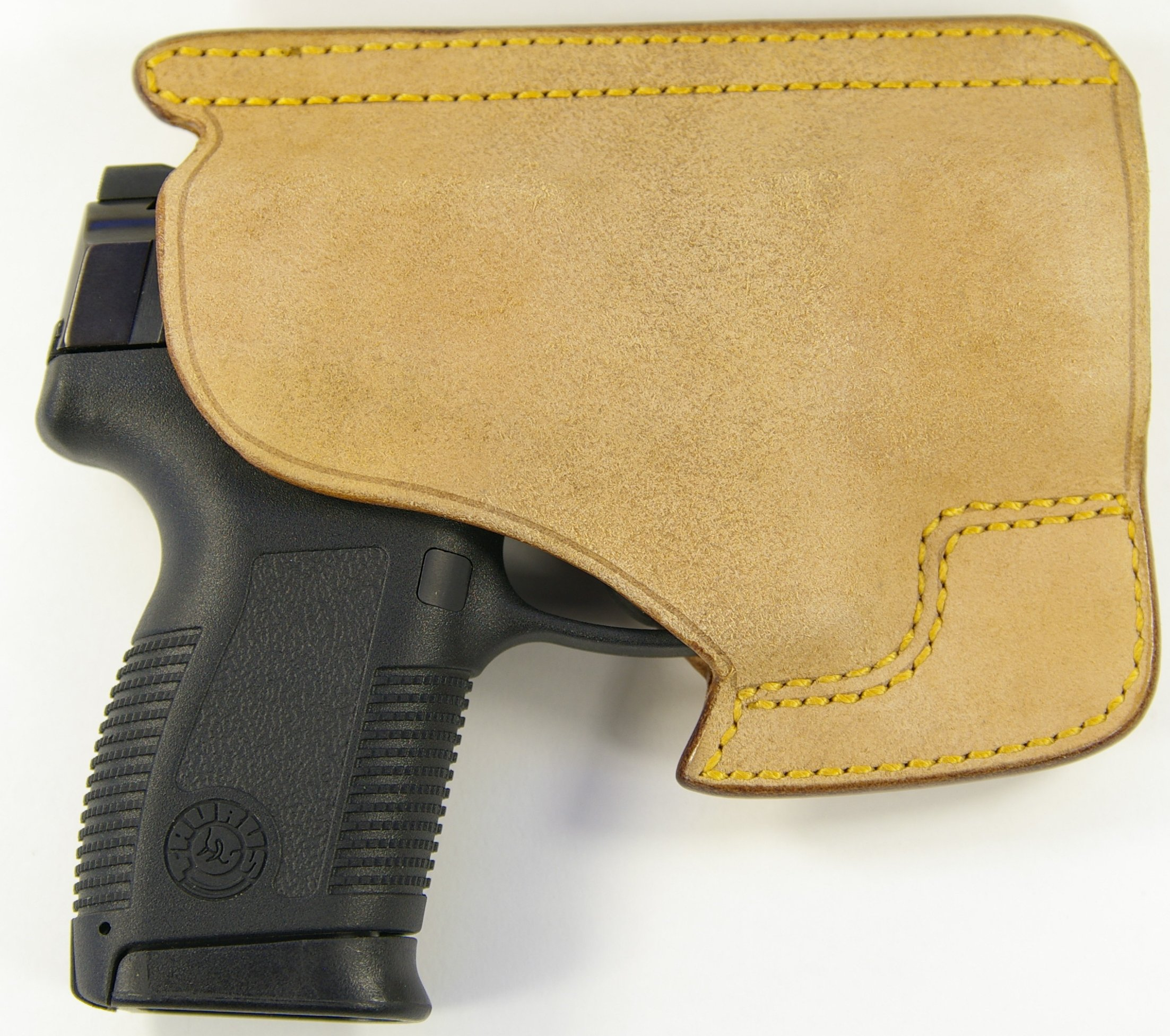
A Taurus Millennium PT145 in a horsehide pocket holster

Holsters can be divided into four broad categories by use: duty holsters, worn by uniformed law enforcement and peace officers and security personnel; tactical holsters, worn by military, security, and law enforcement personnel in certain situations; concealment holsters, worn by plainclothes peace officers and private persons; and sporting holsters, worn for shooting sports and hunting.

Duty holsters are designed to be carried openly, so concealment is not an issue, but retention and appearance are. Duty holsters can be made of leather, nylon, or plastic; they are designed to be attached to a duty belt, and worn on the dominant side. Duty holsters are generally only found for service and compact size handguns as opposed to small subcompact handguns as these are generally only used for concealed carry backup guns.

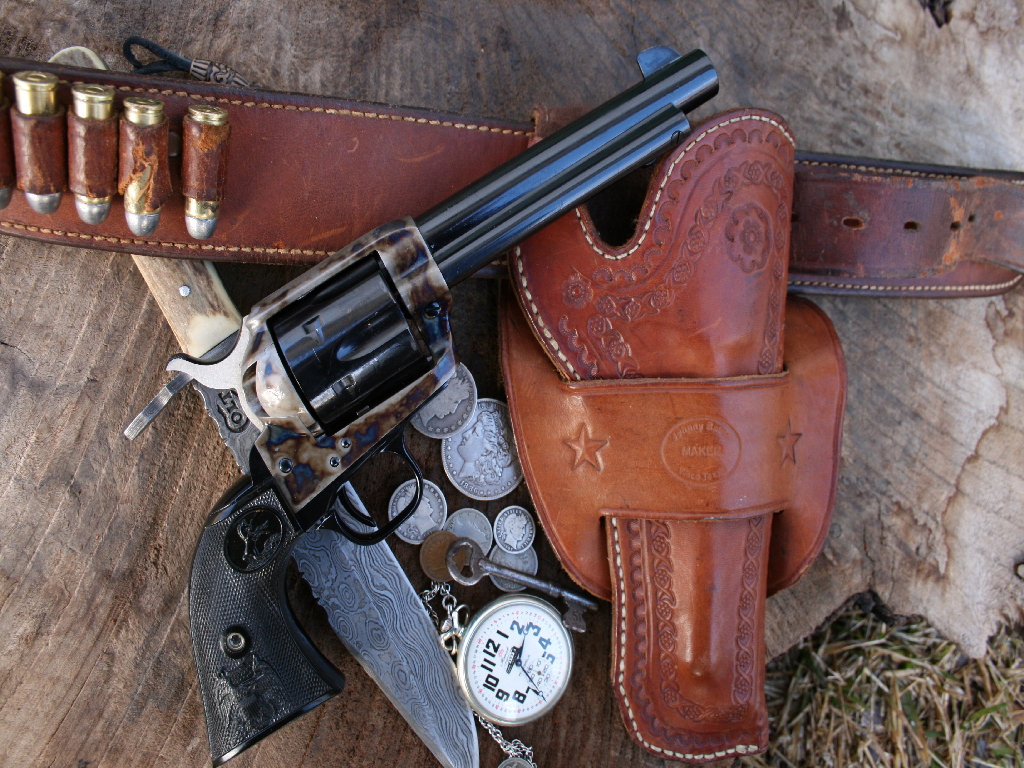
19th – early 20th century single-loop holster

The primary characteristic that often distinguishes duty holsters from all other holster designs is retention. Modern law enforcement duty holsters are available with varying levels of retention security (i.e. Level I, Level II, Level II+, Level III, etc.). Some security features are passive (such as retention screws, decoy straps, or hood guards), while others are active and require deliberate manipulation by the officer during the draw (such as traditional thumbreak snaps). While a higher level of retention will make it more difficult for a suspect to take a holstered handgun from an officer, it may also reduce the speed and ease with which an officer may draw their handgun (especially if the security features are active and not passive). Therefore, when selecting a duty holster, an officer may be forced to find a compromise of speed and retention that they are comfortable with.

Tactical/military holsters are usually made of nylon or plastic. They may be made in a camouflage pattern to match the wearer's uniform. They are often of a drop-leg design and offer a retention device. Some military holsters still use the old flap design (also referred to as a "suicide" or "widow maker" holster, which is cumbersome and slow on the draw, but provides greater protection for the holstered firearm against the elements).

There is some overlap between duty holsters, tactical holsters, and military holsters. Weapon retention is generally not as important a consideration in military use as it is in law enforcement due to the differences in their work environments.

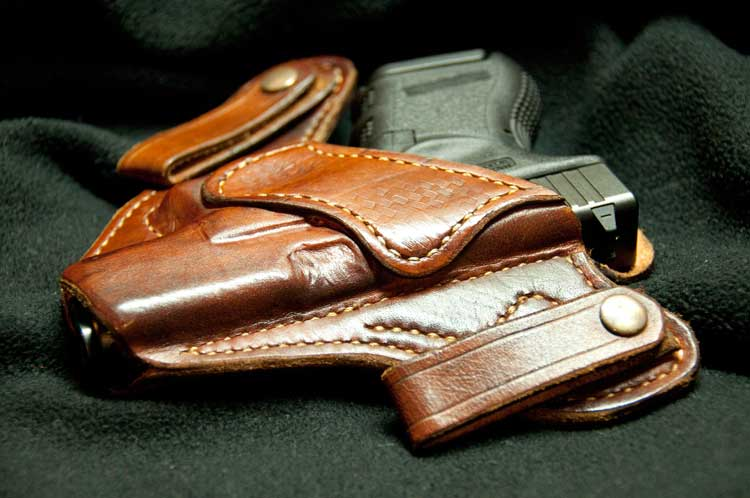
An IWB concealment holster

Concealment holsters are designed to be easily concealed, as well as lightweight and unobtrusive. They are generally designed for subcompact and compact handguns since they are easier to conceal. Concealment holsters are designed to be worn under clothing, such as on the belt under a coat, under pants in an ankle holster, or in a trouser pocket. Since the holster is held close to the body, comfort is important, and concealment holsters often have broad surfaces in contact with the user's body, to distribute the pressure across a wider area and prevent abrasion of the skin. Protecting the handgun from the user's perspiration is often an important consideration in such carry locations. A holster sweat guard is an optional part of a holster or is added to a holster to protect the user's body from direct contact with the slide or sights of the firearm. Often the outside of the holster is broader, to help break up the outline of the handgun and prevent printing, where the outline of the gun can be seen through clothing. For pocket holsters, the external flat side is often the side with a nap, or rougher surface, to hold the holster in place when drawing the pistol.

Sporting holsters cover a wide spectrum of styles: maximum access for fast draw shooting, highly adjustable holsters used in IPSC and pin shooting, old-fashioned holsters used in Cowboy Action Shooting, high retention, maximum protection holsters used for handgun hunting, and simple holsters used to hold a handgun while out plinking. Like any sporting equipment, sporting holsters evolve to maximize the benefits given the rules of the game, where applicable, so the competitive sports have the most specialized holsters.

Holsters for hunting can be unique if they are designed to carry large handguns or to make allowances for telescopic sights. Large handguns are often carried in holsters that are slung across the shoulder, and removed from the body before the handgun is drawn. Slow access is acceptable in this case because the handgun is not expected to be used for defensive purposes.

=== Categories by method of wear ===
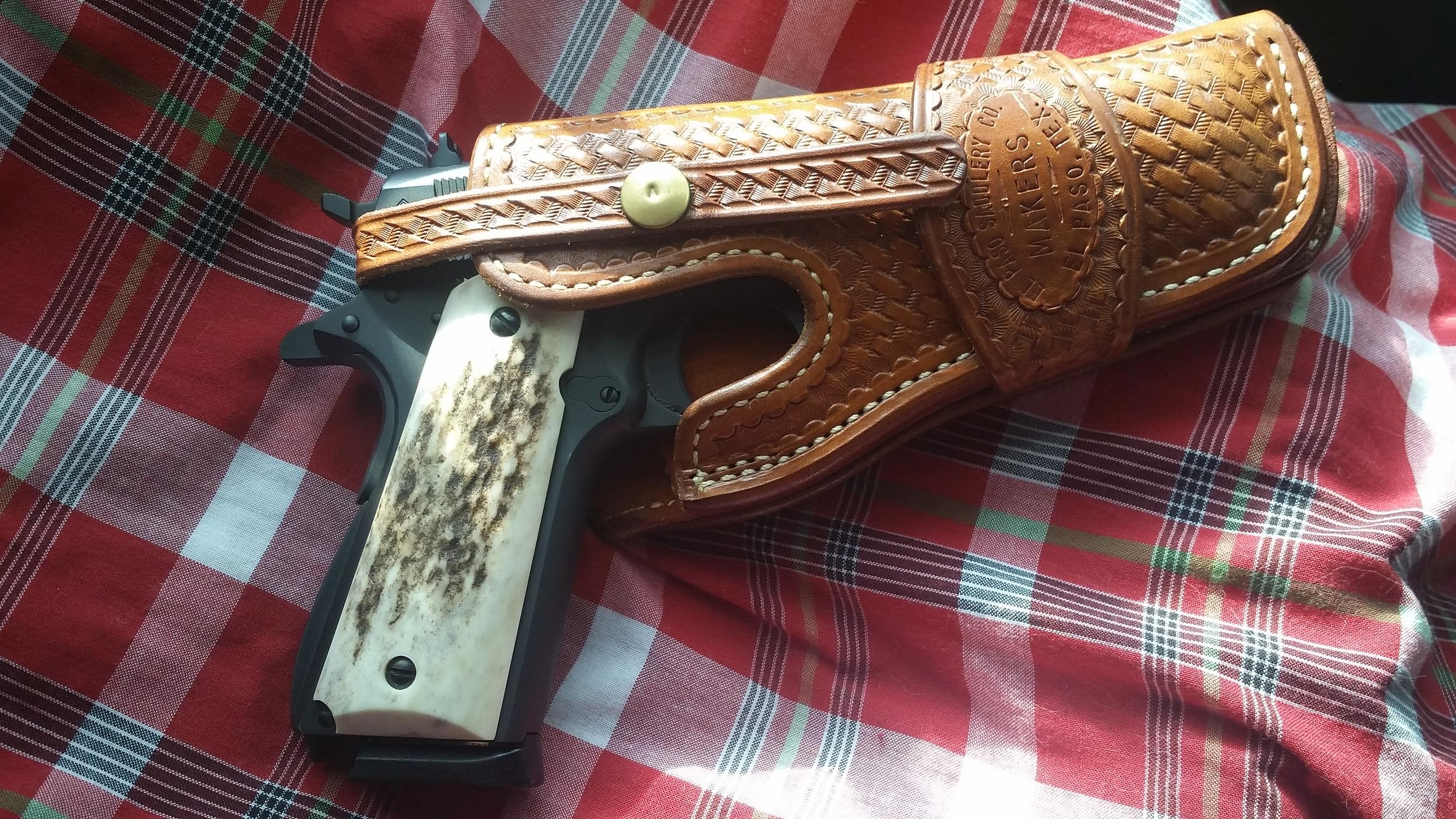
An OWB holster with a forward cant intended for wear on the right hip

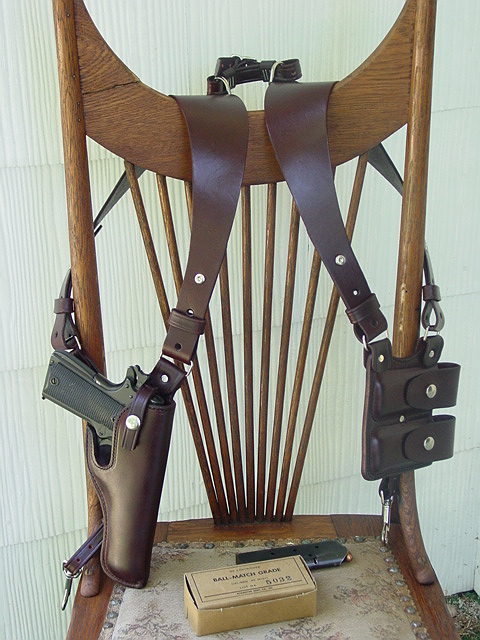
An Idaho Leather Company Last Man Standing, a vertical shoulder holster

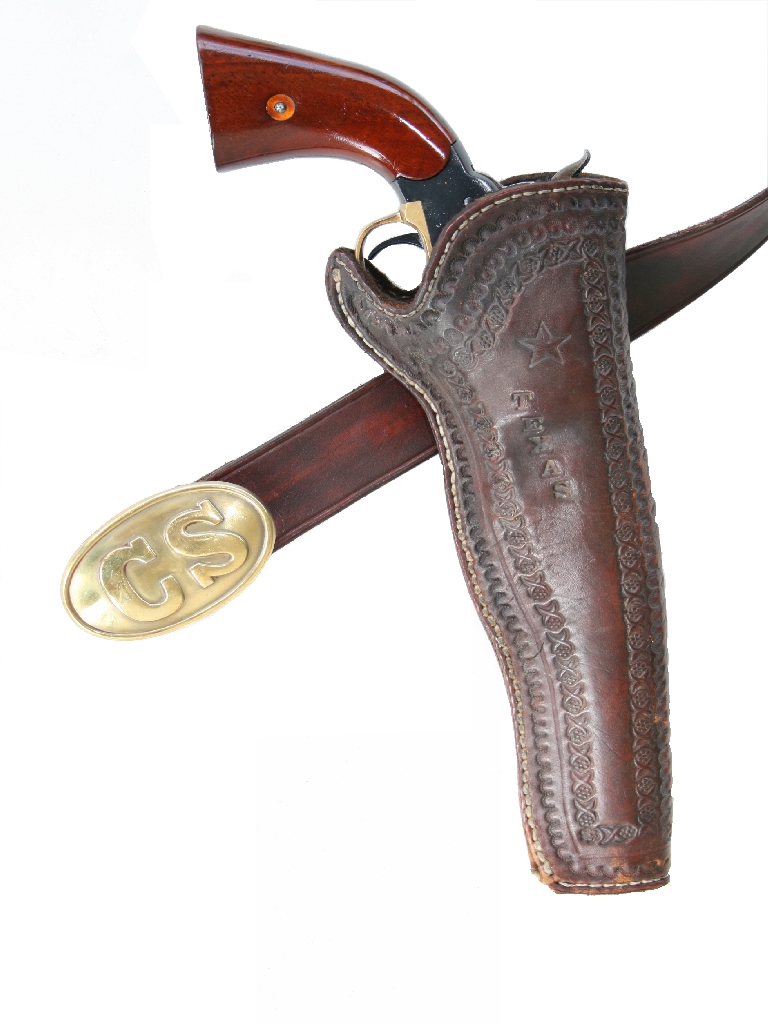
A Slim Jim holster, a traditional design in the percussion revolver era

Popular holster types are:

- Outside the waistband (OWB) or belt holsters, are most commonly used by police and military, and by citizens who choose to open carry. Belt holsters can be worn high and close to the body, slightly behind the hip bone ("4:00 position"), and can be concealed under a long, untucked shirt or jacket.
- Inside the waistband (IWB) holsters, which clip or mount to a belt and allow one to securely holster the weapon inside the pants. Some IWB holsters give the wearer the option of tucking a shirt over the firearm and holster. A variant design is an "appendix inside the waistband holster" (AIWB), intended to allow wear inside the front of the pants (as opposed to the side or rear). Appendix optimized holsters generally are outfitted with a wing/claw designed to help tuck the grip of the firearm into the body for increased concealment and often include a wedge which improves both concealment and comfort for most users.
- Appendix rigs, or "sidecar holsters" (named after the T.Rex Arms Sidecar holster) are variant design of the AIWB holsters with an attached magazine carrier. Some are modular in design, such as the Dara Modular Appendix Rig. In some cases the attached mag carrier could be part of holster or it could be attached with flexible cord or by other means such as with the KSG Knox holster.
- Below waistband (BWB), made popular by Urban Carry Holsters manufacturer, is a style of holster that attaches directly below the waistline and is more deeply concealed than a traditional IWB holster.
- Shoulder holsters consist of two straps connected in a manner similar to a backpack, with the actual holster mounted to a strap on the right or the left side. The direction of this holster is either vertical, for long guns like large or full-frame caliber revolvers, or horizontal, for other firearms. Shoulder holsters are typically comfortable for the wearer, as they distribute the weight across the shoulders instead of directly on the belt. Normally, the leather straps cross over on shoulders and back. The spare magazines hang in opposite directions of the body from the holster. It also allows to carry a gun in jacket or sports coat.
- Sling holsters are similar to shoulder holsters, but instead consist of a band worn over one shoulder and another around the chest. This style of holster (designated M3 for the early 1-strap model and M7 for the two-strap model in the U.S. military) was used for pilots, tank operators, and other vehicle drivers in World War II as they were easier to use in the seated position. They became popular with other soldiers who disliked the heavy leather flap on the standard issue M1911A1 hip holster. They are still produced by the U.S. military.
- The belly band holster is a wide elastic belt with a built-in holster, usually worn under an untucked shirt, to facilitate access. There are various types, worn at the belt line or higher, with the gun placement anywhere from in front to under the armpit. In order to remain in place, a belly band must be extremely tight; this is generally uncomfortable – it is comparable to wearing a girdle.
- Pocket holsters are used for very small weapons, such as a pocket pistols.
- Small of back holsters place the weapon directly over the center of the back, allowing for even large handguns to be carried with little printing.
- Thigh holsters (also named as tactical or drop leg holsters) are a popular law enforcement and police item that stores the sidearm on the leg where the hand naturally hangs, making for a fast draw. Early U.S. cavalry units used these in the early 1900s with a leather thong strapping it to the leg. Modern ones often use a drop leg PALS grid with a modular holster attached, often with buckles for quick release. Law enforcement and military personnel wear these when a bulky vest or a full belt (as in the case of K9 officers) makes belt carry unhelpful, or when they want an alternative to another holster. Western style holsters of this type, known as buscadero holsters, were worn by many actors in Western films and TV shows set in the 1800s, even though they were not invented until the 1920s.
- Ankle (aka "boot") holsters offer excellent concealment and are used by law enforcement officials who wish to carry a secondary weapon to back up their primary firearm. However, many officers find that even a small handgun bounces around too much while running or during other physical activities.
- Chest holsters can be attached to MOLLE-compatible vests and chest carriers. Like shoulder holsters, chest holsters are often easier to draw from than belt holsters when the operator is seated inside a vehicle.
- Strut holsters are used exclusively for concealed carry. They are worn above the trouser belt line as a cross draw holster located directly under one's arm (9 o'clock position) or toward the front of the body (10 to 11 o'clock position). The design contains a strut which is shaped to nest behind one's trouser belt and attach to the holster at the other end. The strut transfers the weight of the firearm to the belt and retains the weapon in place for secure removal. A flexible band is also attached to the holster and worn above the waist to keep the weapon snug against the body. Concealment is achieved by wearing the unit inside of a shirt which may be tucked in or worn outside.
- Pancake holsters are typically made of two pieces of the material with the handgun sandwiched between them, containing at least two belt slots. They should be carried slightly off the hip to the rear part of the back. The pancake style of carry allows pulling the gun tight against the body for a better concealment.
- Cross-draw belt holsters are designed to be worn outside the waistline on the weak side of the body (opposite to the dominant hand). Although the cross-draw carry is often considered to be slower due to the necessary movement across the body, drawing the gun from a seated position can be more comfortable and even quicker carry method compared to the others. Cross-draw belt holsters may be an ideal option for wearing a backup gun on the waistline and also appropriate choice for women due to the comfort of carry and its natural adaptability to the female body.

=== Attachment options ===
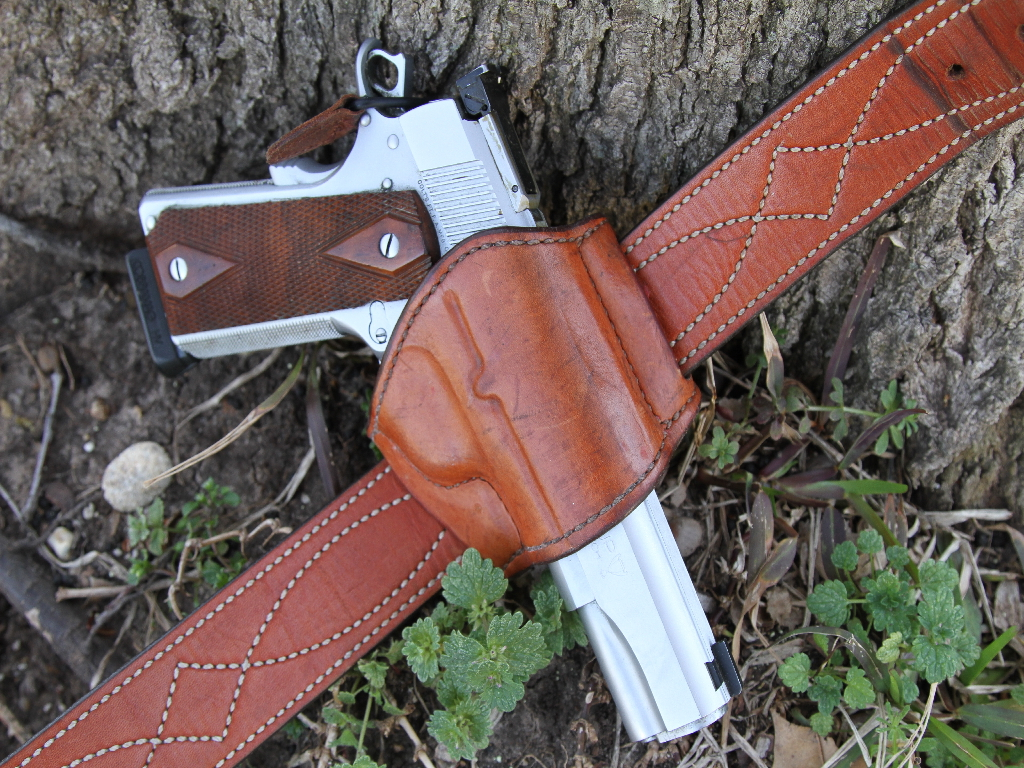
A belt slide holster

The safest way for carrying a handgun is carrying it in a holster that keeps the gun stable on its place and yet gives comfort and easy access when needed. As there are many different types of holster and ways for concealed carrying, one is able to choose the one that suits one's expectations and needs. For all these preferences such as – concealed carrying, safety, stability and easy accessibility, the most popular among customers are belt holsters. However, even in this group one can choose the different type of attaching the holster. Some of the most common belt holster attachment options are:

- Belt loops – it consist of two or more metal pieces which helps to properly attach the holster to the belt. Even though it takes longer to put on and take off, it gives the holster a better stability and fits perfectly. Two and more belt loops enable to wear holster in diverse angles.
- Belt tunnel – one wider loop that is easily threaded through the belt. One disadvantage is worse stability.
- Belt snaps – much easier to put on and take off the belt and yet keep the holstered gun stable.
- Belt clip – the holster is securely clipped on the waistband without taking the belt off which helps to attach the holster quickly and easily. The belt clip can be either made of steel or polymer.
- Paddle – a comfortable way to wear a gun holstered, very easily attached to the belt of trousers – even without wearing a belt. Disadvantage is looser fixation and safety risks that come with it.
- Lowered belt loop – the best type for professionals for its easy and fast accessibility. Enables one to adjust the high and angle of the holstered handgun. Since it is the type for open carry, it is suitable only with an appropriate permission.
- Traditionally a holster is attached to a waist belt, thigh belt or shoulder harness that will offer draw-resistance. Other options like belly-bands, fanny packs or specially designed rigs like the Enigma offer alternative conceal carry options that do not require a standard belt.

== Makers ==
Custom leather workers typically focus on one area or two in leather work. Holster makers are those who usually stay put in their respective field. Any and all pistols, whether compact, mid-size or large hand-guns are sheathed in leather in a process that molds to the firearm, and hardens to a stout, strong and long lasting holster. These can be made into inside waist band, strong side, cross-over, shoulder holster, chest holster, pocket and inside the shirt. These holsters are made for competition shooters, recreational, security and law enforcement.

A newer generation of manufacturing has come to the forefront for holster manufacturing, using things like Kydex, 3D printing, and injection molding. These newer techniques provide for longer lasting products that are more easily adapted to different handgun combinations including lights, lasers, suppressors, sights and optics that are commonly installed on more modern handguns. Leather holsters are still very popular in many circles of competition, concealed carry, and outdoor activities, but the plastic holsters are outpacing leather holsters year over year due to their increased number of mounting options as well as the aforementioned benefits of modularity.

== See also ==
- Bandolier
- Bridgeport rig
- Paddle holster
- Scabbard
