= Hiatt speedcuffs =

Model of handcuff

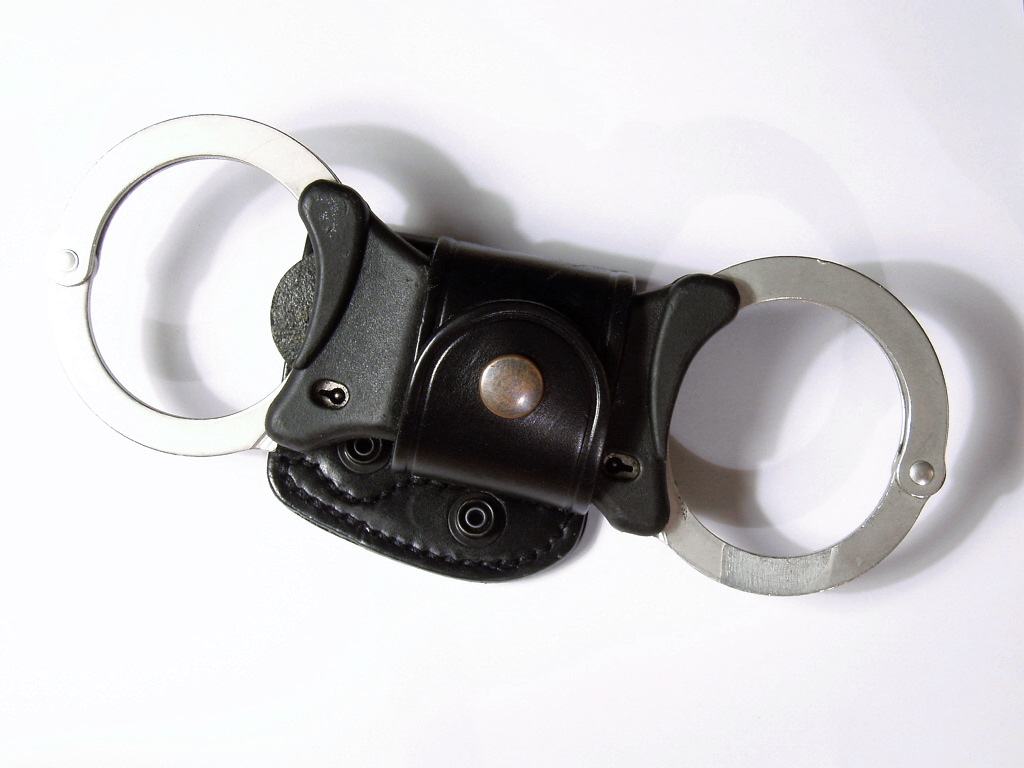
Hiatt speedcuffs in a design of holster

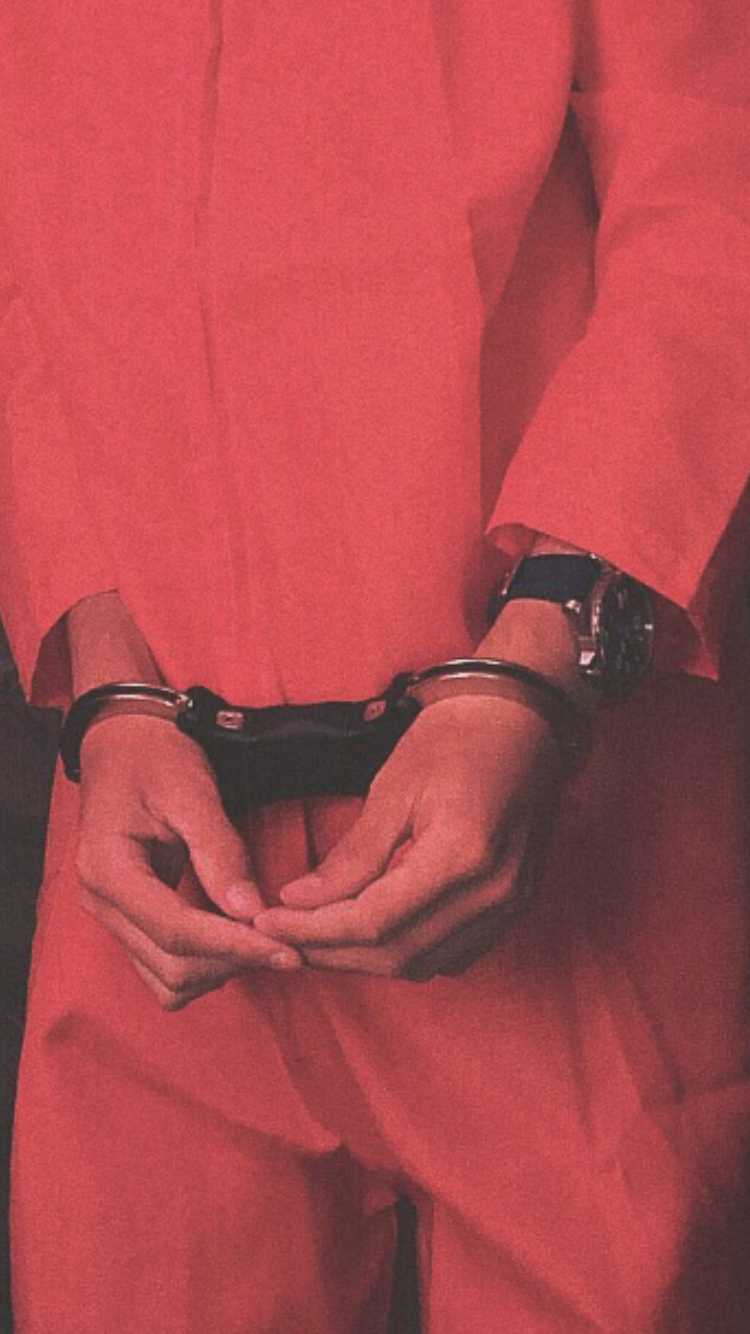
Handcuffed hands in speedcuffs

Speedcuffs are a model of handcuff characterised by their rigid grip between the two ratchet cuffs. Their rigid design and the inclusion of a grip makes them effective for gaining control over a struggling prisoner, even if only one cuff has been applied. They are standard issue for most police forces within the United Kingdom and the State Police of Western Australia.

== Construction ==
Speedcuffs consist of two conventional ratchet handcuffs connected by a rigid metal bar, which is enclosed in a plastic grip secured with bolts. Removal of the grip offers no advantage to escape, as it is only present to facilitate the comfortable manipulation of the cuffs by the arresting officer. Weighing 390 g (13.75 oz) and with a maximum dilation of 23.2 cm (9.13 inches), the speedcuffs are slightly larger than the chain-linked and hinged handcuffs previously manufactured by Hiatts, and accommodate a greater range of wrist sizes. They feature Hiatt's 'back loading' feature, which allows the ratchet to be pulled backwards for a few "clicks" through the lock casing to set the cuffs in the ideal position for quick application. The locks accept a standard handcuff key, and have a double locking facility which is activated through a small pin on the back of the cuff. The double locking facility must be depressed with a pointed object, such as the protrusion found on the top of the handcuff key; double locking prevents accidentally or knowingly tightening the cuff once it has been locked, helping to prevent paralysis or other injury.

== Application ==
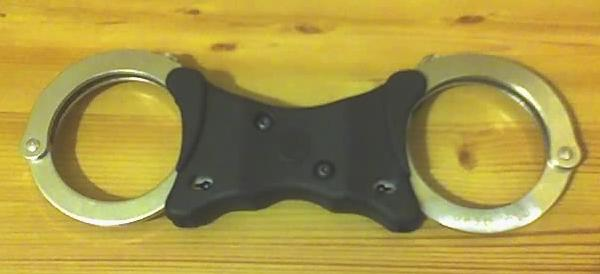
Speedcuffs

The mechanism of speedcuff application is the same as other modern "swing through" handcuffs. By pressing the pivoted arm of the cuff against the wrist, the arm can be made to swing around the wrist and engage with the lock. The officer may then tighten the cuff to an appropriate position before applying the other cuff, engaging the double locking system to prevent the handcuffs tightening further.

Owing to the rigid design, speedcuffs can be applied in one of four different positions, which also apply to hinged handcuffs but not chain-linked. In British police training, these positions are termed 'front stack', 'rear stack', 'palm to palm', and 'back to back'. Many forces teach two positions to their officers, but some teach all four.

The 'stacked' positions are those where, once applied (assuming a standing prisoner), the handcuffs are vertical and the wrists pass through the cuffs in opposite directions, resulting in one hand on each side of the handcuffs.

'Palm to palm' is the position that results when the handcuffs are applied in front of the body, with the palms of the hands facing each other. This is generally considered to be inferior in terms of security to a front stack, in which position it is extremely difficult for a prisoner to attempt to strike any person with their hands.

'Back to back' is the position that results when the handcuffs are applied with the hands behind the body, with the backs of the hands facing each other.

Rear 'palm to palm' and front 'back to back' are possible, but seldom used as 'back to back' is more secure in the rear, and 'palm to palm' is more comfortable in the front.

When these handcuffs are applied in a 'non stack' position, it is more secure for the keyholes to be on the opposite side of the hands so that the prisoner cannot reach the keyhole if he/she were to have a handcuff key.

In a confrontational situation, although the ultimate intention may be to apply the handcuffs to the rear in the back-to-back position, officers are often forced to settle for the first position in which they can get both of the suspect's wrists.

== Media ==
These photos show how these handcuffs are used.

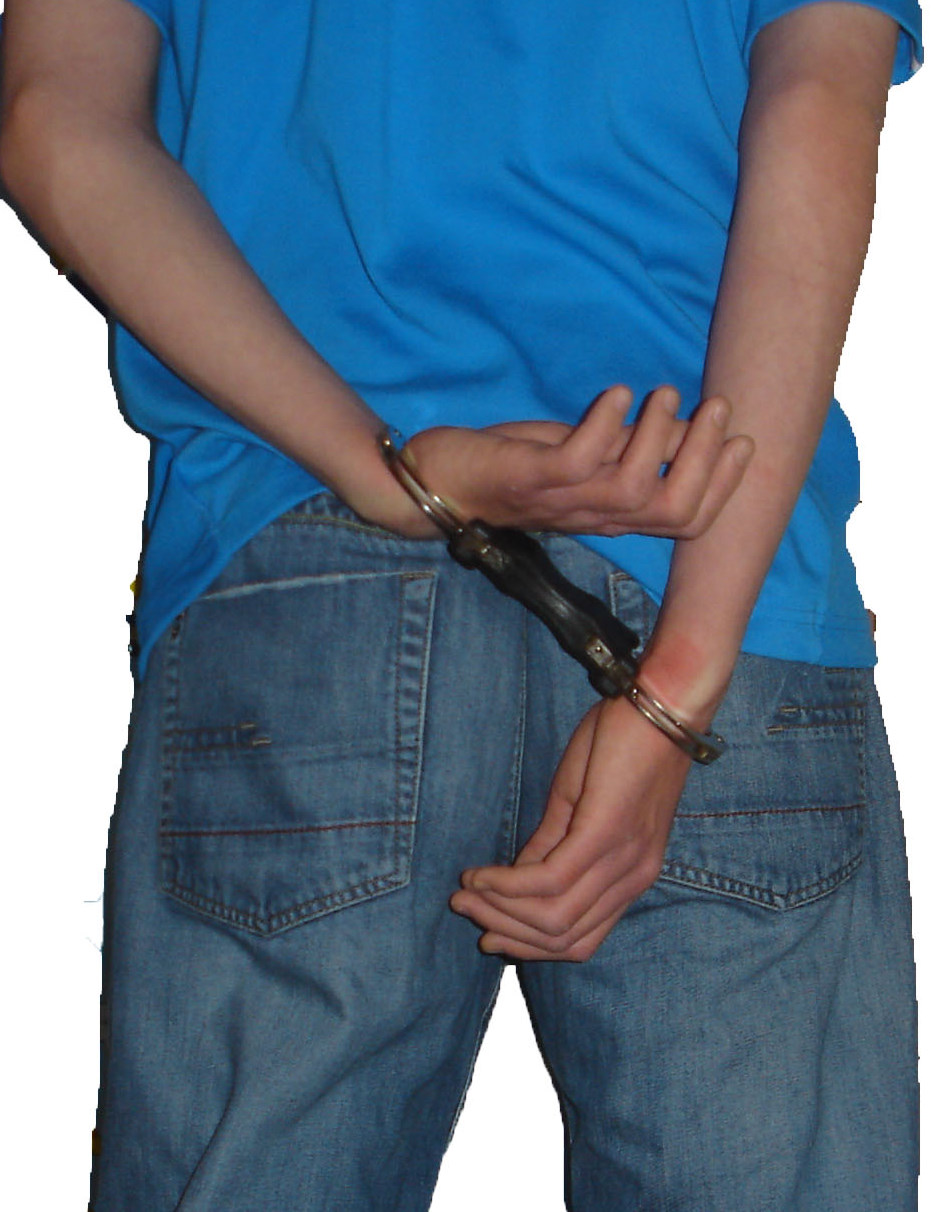
The cuffs applied behind in the rear stack position

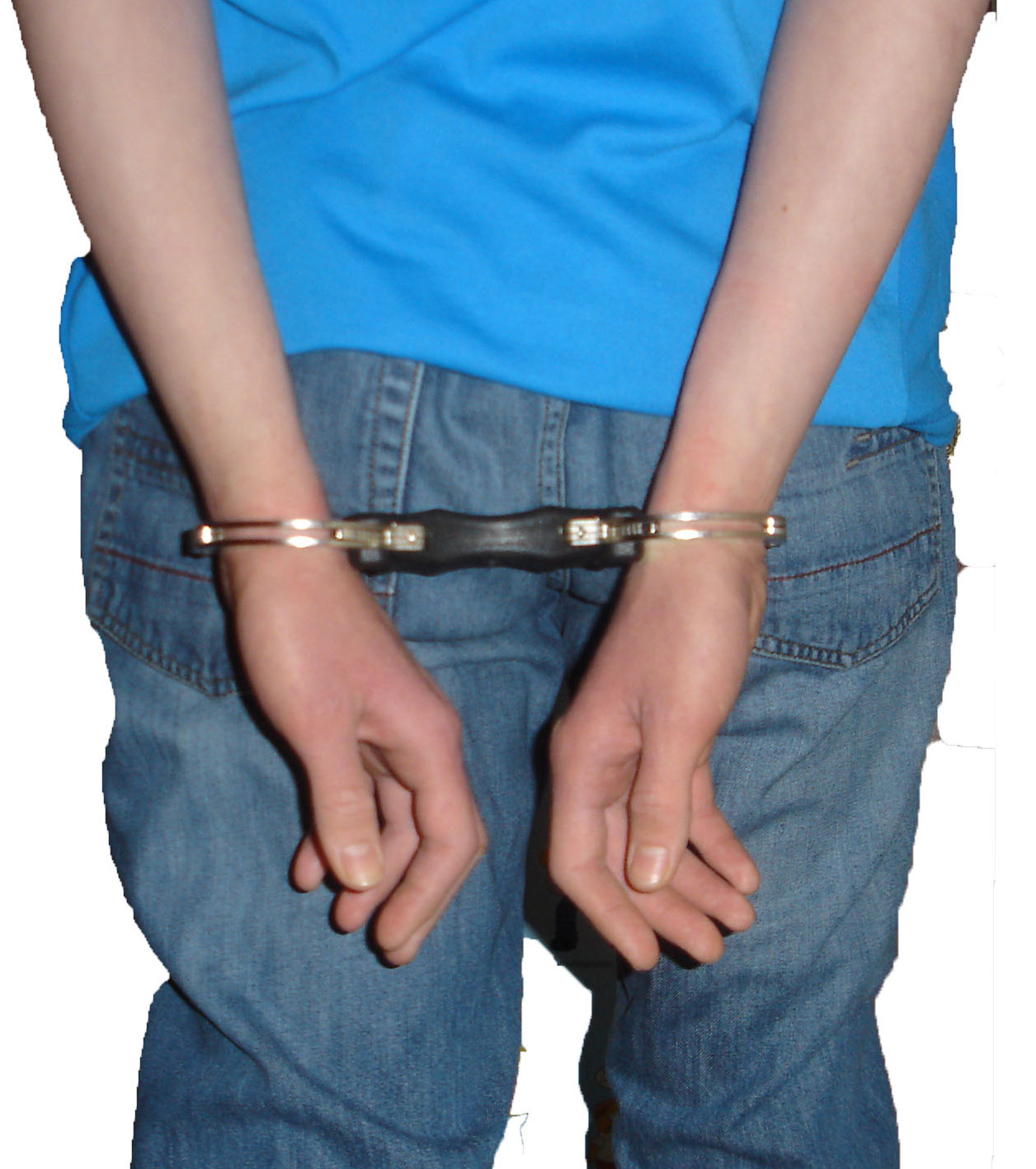
The handcuffs applied behind the back in the back to back position

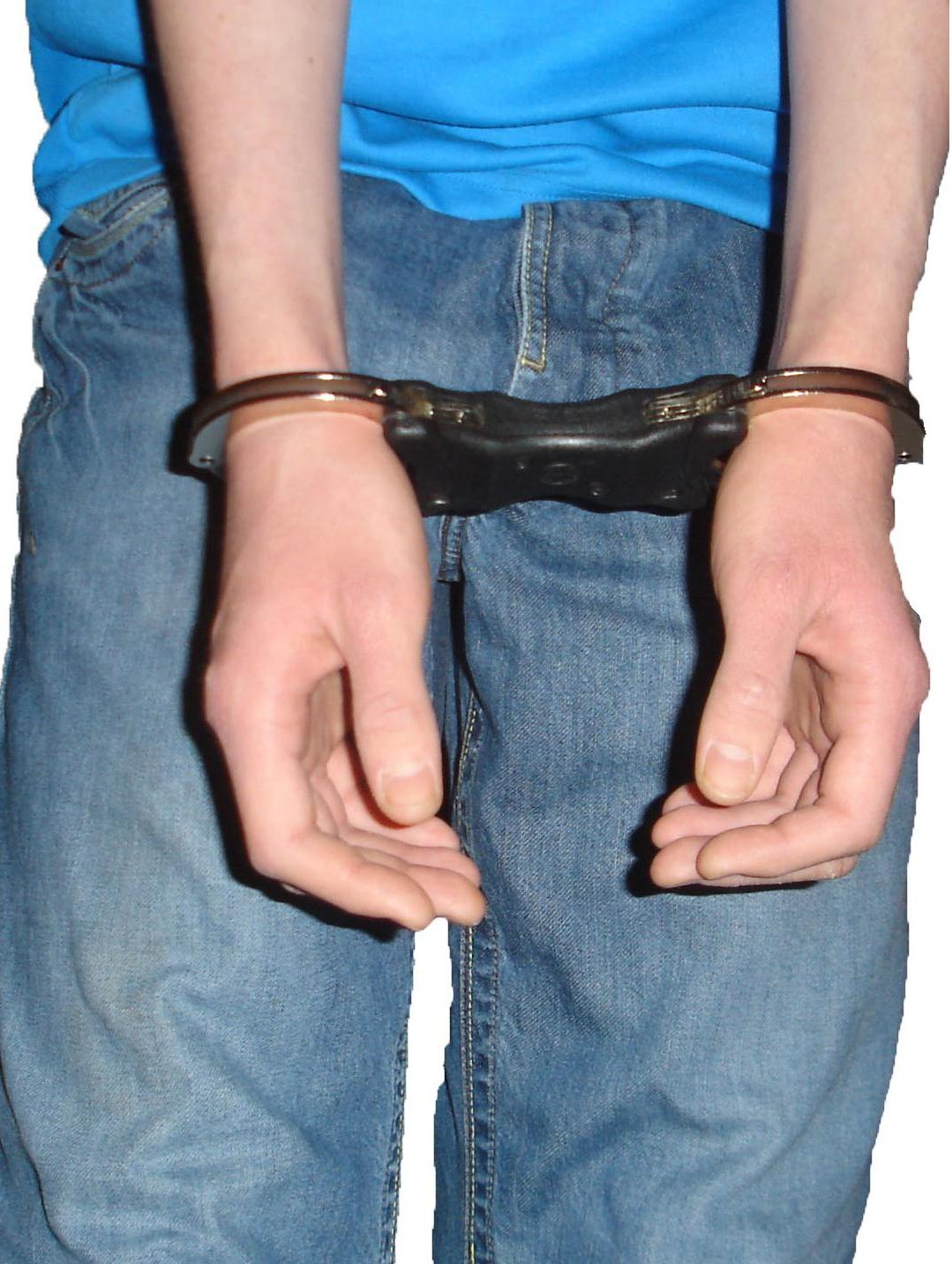
Cuffs applied in front in the palm to palm position

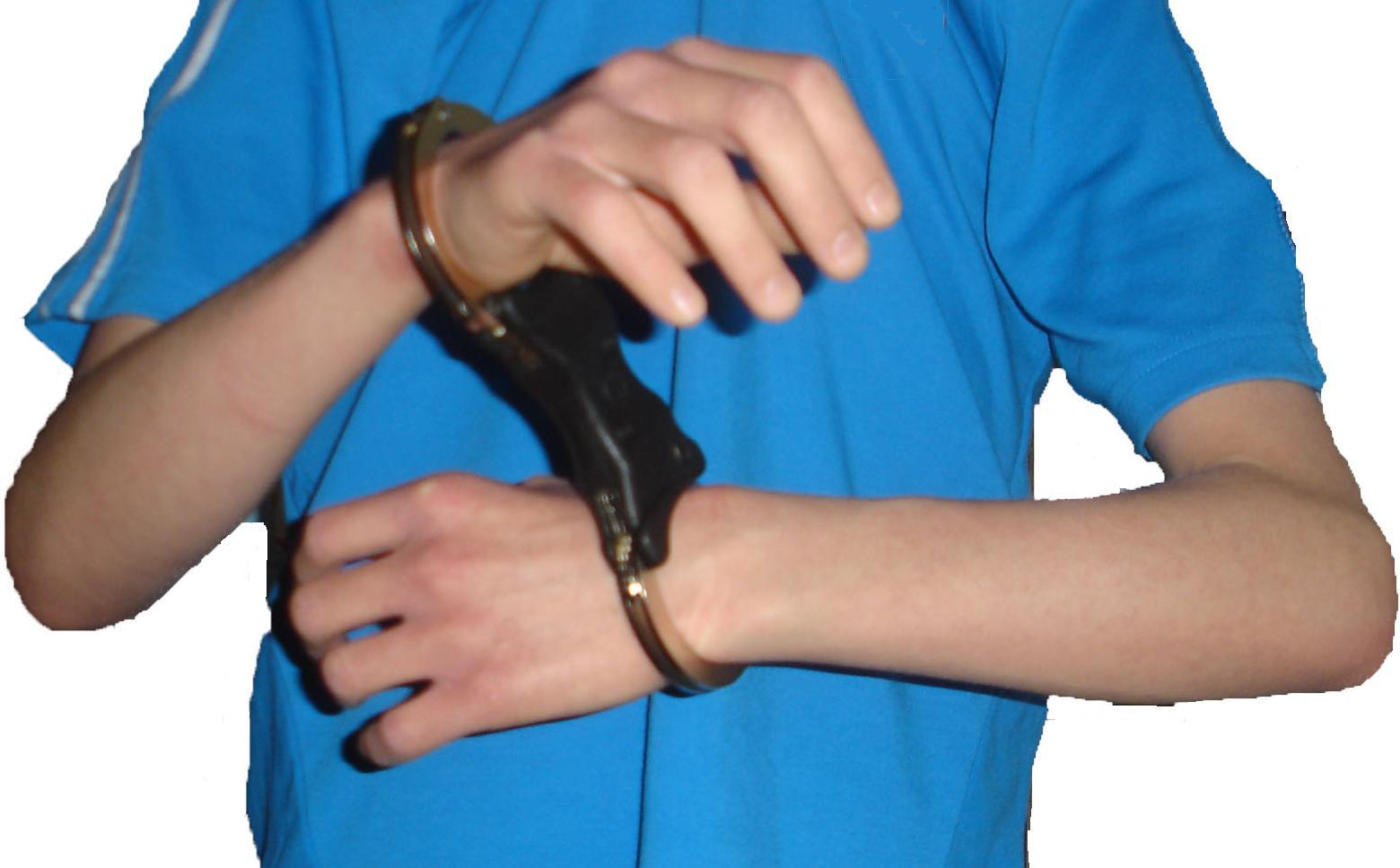
Handcuffs applied in front stack position

== Hiatt folding handcuffs ==
While conventional rigid handcuffs have traditionally been advantageous when the arresting officer has to try to keep the suspect under control, there has been increasing complaint from officers that such cuffs are bulky and inconvenient to carry. Hiatt developed a handcuff known as 'Rigid Folding Handcuffs' which work on the basis that they 'click' into place, staying rigid. It can be folded up, so they can be put on a belt or in a pocket. In the UK, undercover police have been known to use these covertly. They are roughly one and a half times the price of normal handcuffs.

After Hiatt ceased its business, its successor Total Control Handcuffs (TCH) continued to produce this model as the TCH 850 Folding Rigid Handcuffs.

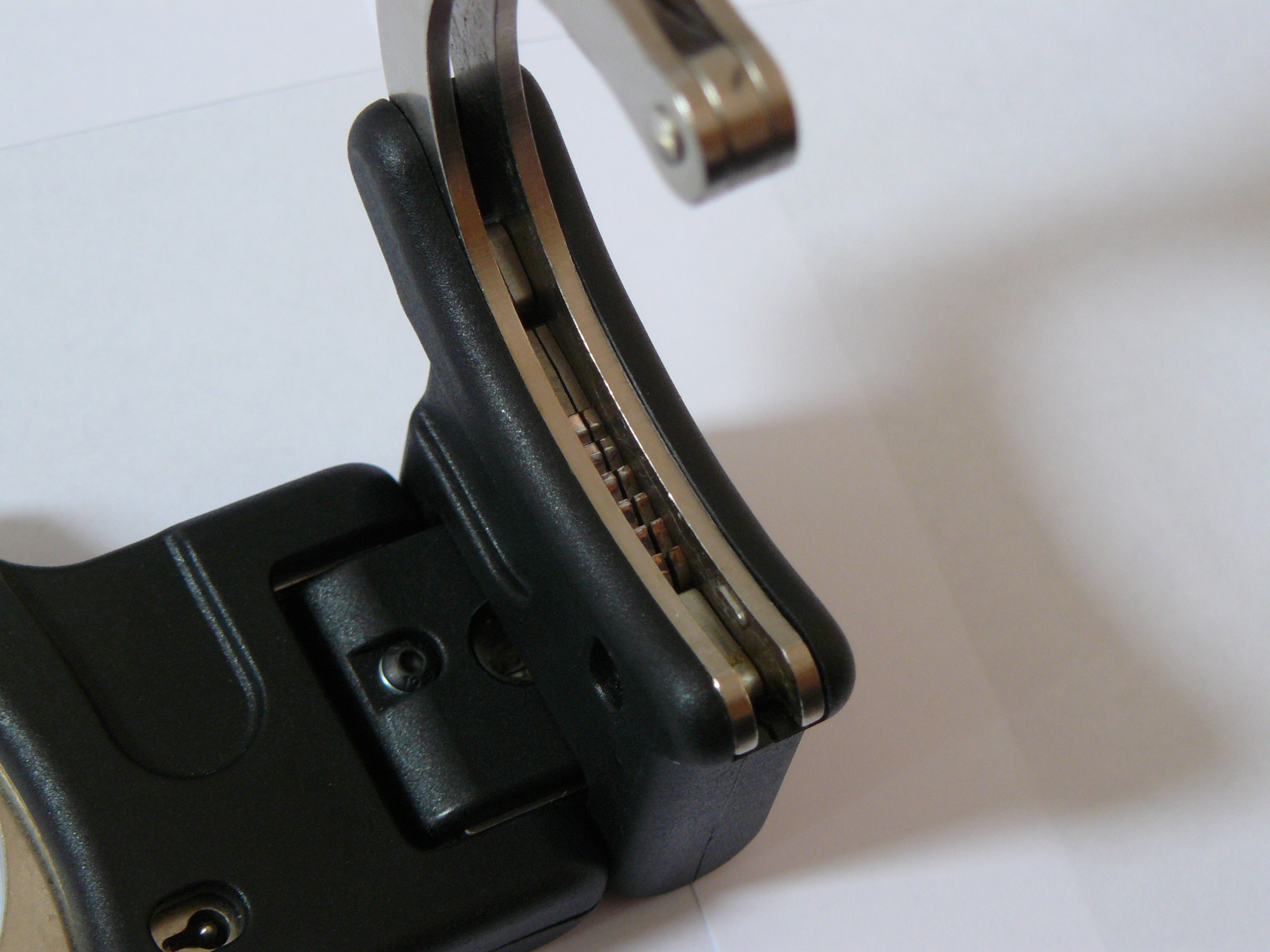
closeup of TCH model 850 in a semi-folded position

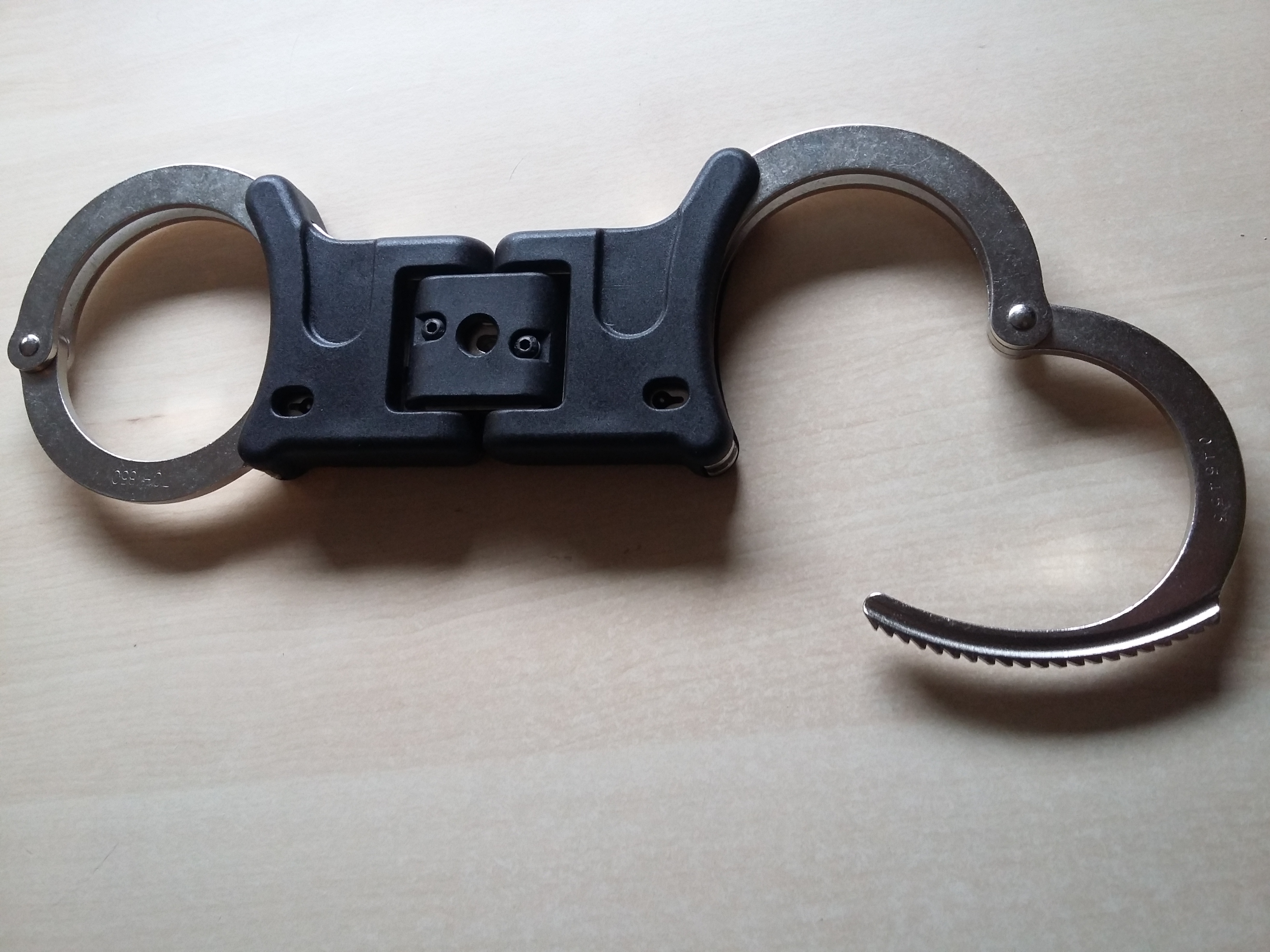
TCH model 850 in expanded (rigid) position

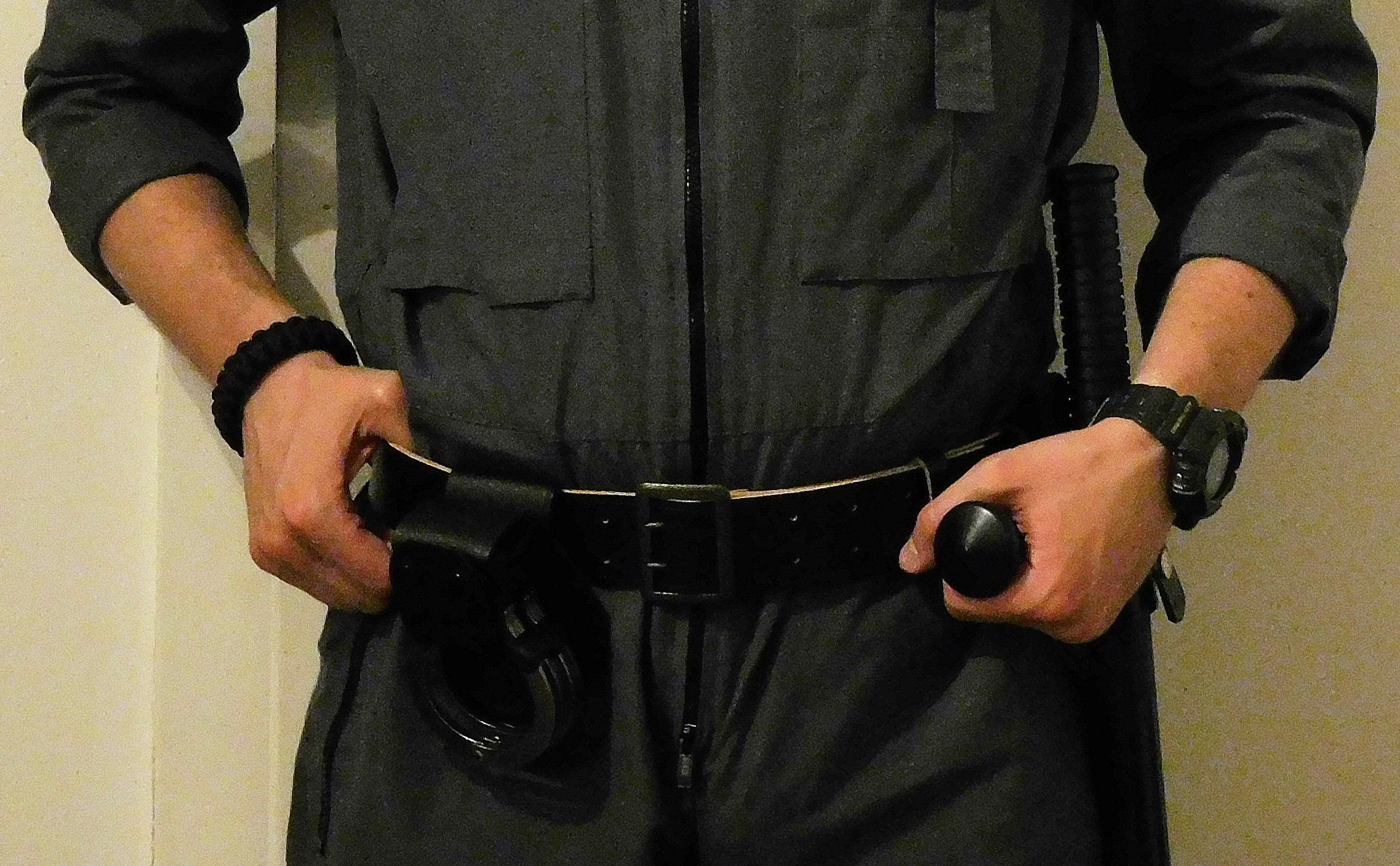
Hiatts "Ultimate" handcuff on a duty belt

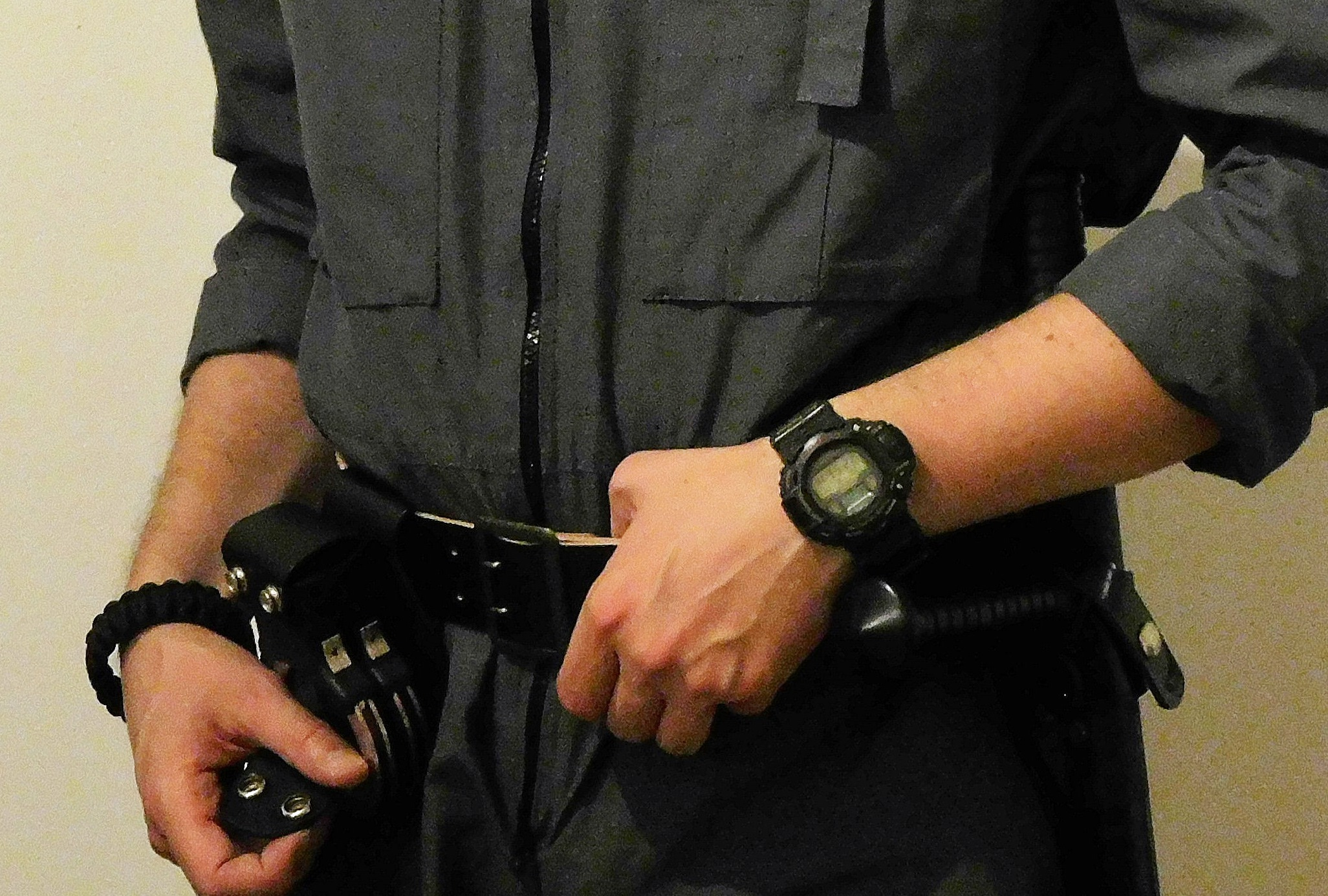
Hiatts "Ultimate" handcuff on a duty belt

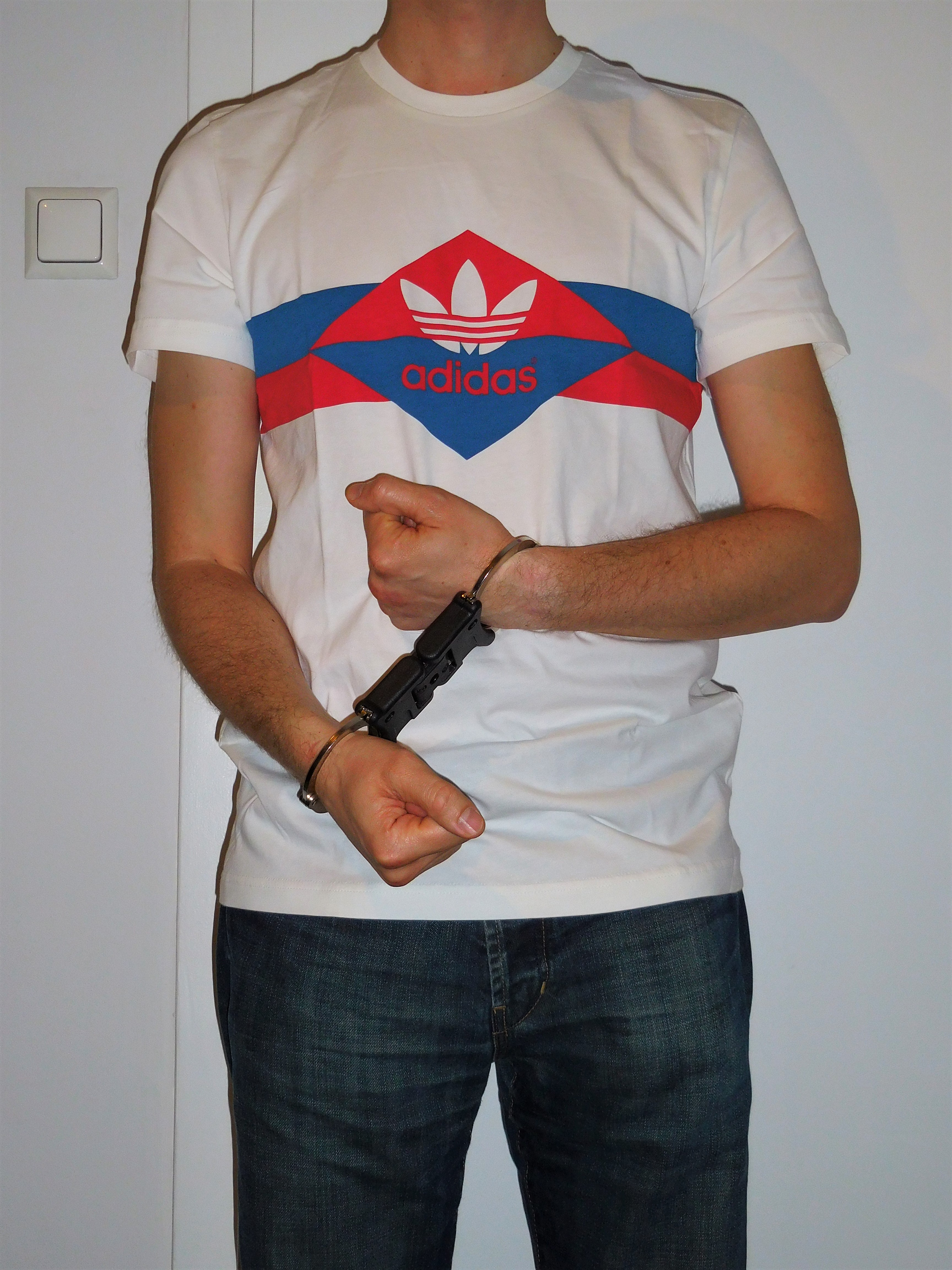
Hiatt "Ultimate" handcuffs on an individual (stacked position)

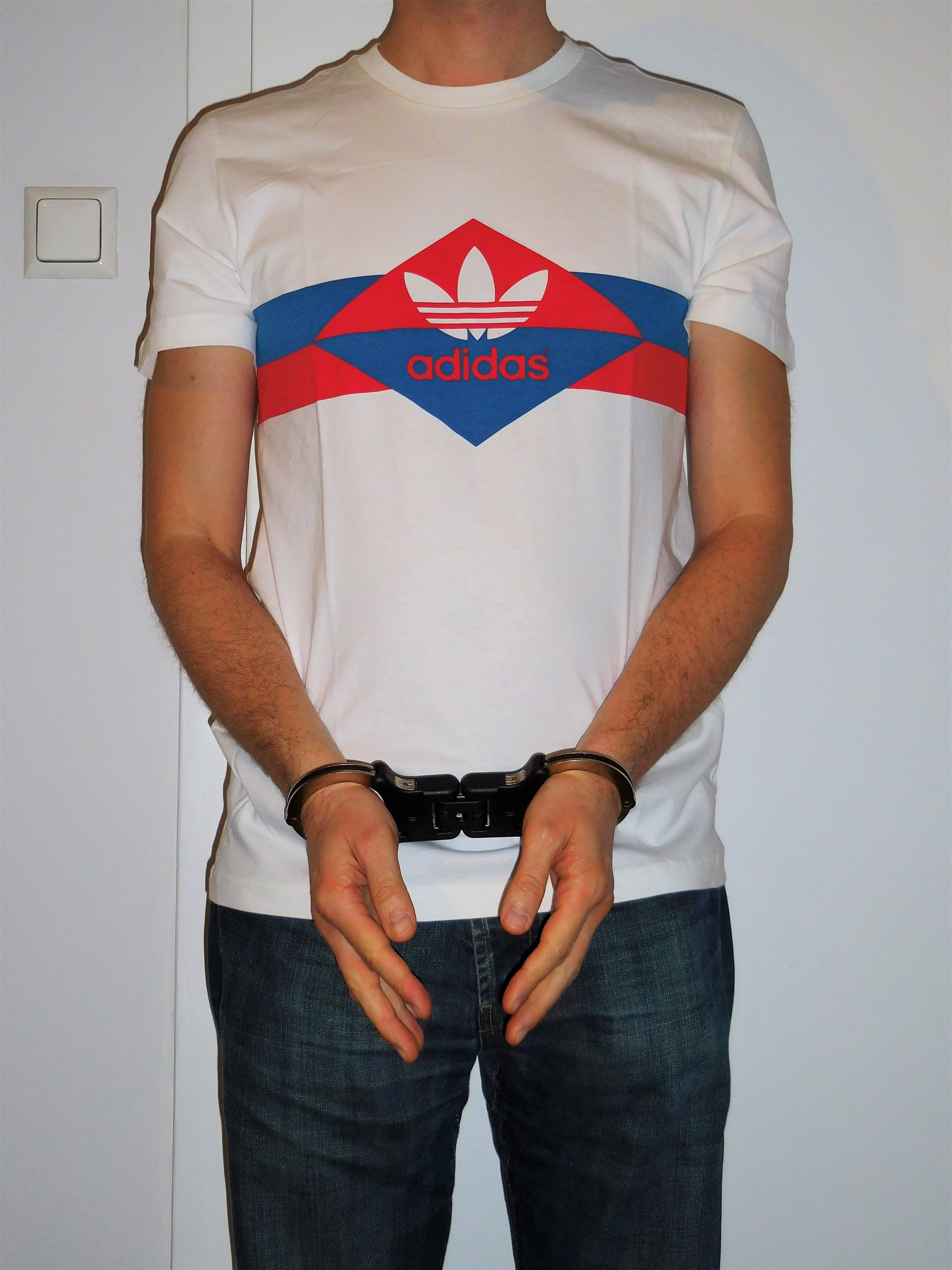
Hiatt "Ultimate" handcuffs on an individual (parallel position)
