= Kydex =

Thermoplastic material

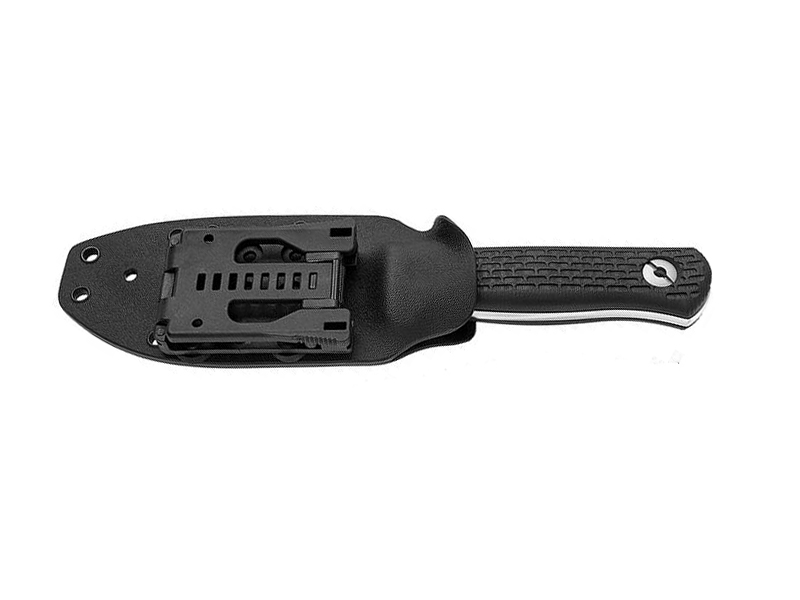
Kydex knife sheath

Kydex is a line of thermoplastic acrylic-polyvinyl chloride materials manufactured by Sekisui SPI. It has a wide variety of applications, including for aircraft bulkheads, firearm holsters, and sheaths.

== Development ==
Kydex sheet was originally produced in 1965 by Rohm and Haas, having been designed for use in aircraft interiors. In 1987, the product line was purchased by Kydex, LLC, formerly Kleerdex Company, LLC, which manufactures the material under the name Sekisui SPI at a location in Bloomsburg, Pennsylvania. In April 2020, the company was renamed Sekisui Kydex, LLC.

== Characteristics ==
It is an acrylic-polyvinyl chloride composite engineered for thermoforming fabrication, and combines properties of both the acrylic and the polyvinyl chloride components. From acrylic, it obtains rigidity and formability; from PVC, toughness, chemical resistance and good interior finish ratings. Sheet thickness ranges from .029 to .500 inches (0.74 to 12.70 mm) and can be thermoformed, post formed, brake formed and laminated.

- Flexural modulus is 2,800 megapascals (400,000 psi)
- Parts formed from sheet will be rigid and will see moderate deformation when loaded. This is of particular importance in deep formed parts with thin wall sections.
- Relatively hard thermoplastic, with a hardness of 90 on the Rockwell R scale. This hardness, combined with a grained surface, increases its abrasion resistance.
- Low flammability, UL 94 classification V-0

For some applications it is used as replacement for leather, where it has the following advantages:

- Waterproof
- Scratch resistant (Rockwell scale "R" hardness of 90)
- Holds its shape better, and will not stretch or shrink under normal conditions
- Lower friction.

== Applications ==
- Knife and tool sheaths
- Springs and tensioners
- Firearm holsters
- Seat backs
- Aircraft pull-down trays
- Truck fenders
- Trays and tote boxes
- DJ booths
- Motor covers
- Safety helmets
- Aircraft fairings
- Air exhaust systems
- Rapid prototyping of systems
- Custom insulators for electronic equipment
- Clean rooms
- Armour for SCA heavy combat
- Telescope tubes
- Autonomous marine vehicles
- Fender for PEVs
