= Thumb break =

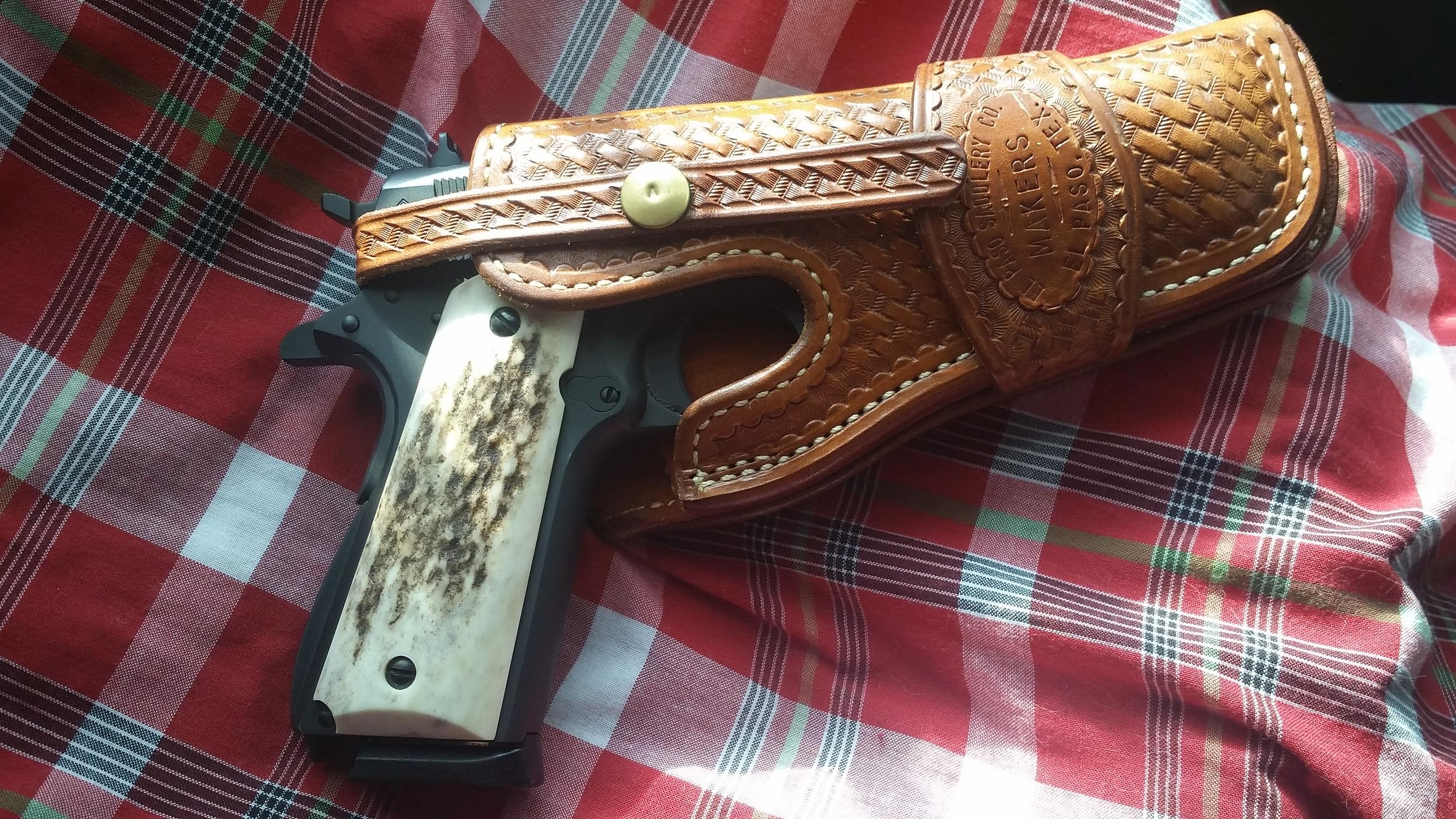
A holster with a retaining strap.

A thumb break or retaining strap is a safety device installed on many holsters and sheaths to prevent a weapon from being unintentionally drawn.

The thumb break helps to prevent an unauthorized person from drawing a pistol or knife from another person's body. It also secures the weapon in the holster or sheath when its owner is engaged in vigorous activities such as parachuting, rappelling, or fighting.

The thumb break is made of the same material as the holster or sheath (i.e., leather or nylon), and may either be permanently attached or removable. The thumb break is held in place by a simple snap mechanism, usually metal, which may be disengaged by pushing the thumb upward against it.

== Pros and cons ==
The metal snap can scratch the finish of the weapon, or even snag it, which could interfere with the user's ability to draw the weapon cleanly and safely.

Some self-defence experts have advised removing thumb breaks, except for people employed in enforcement (who are at greater risk of encountering someone who may try to grab their weapon). If a thumb break is designed to be non-removable, it may be snipped off with a pair of shears.

Regarding a concealed carry where the gun is covered so no one knows you are carrying it, the thumb break is not as necessary compared to the ‘open carry’ used by many policemen. General misunderstanding is that with an open top, the gun is more likely to fall out. A quality holster is molded to the particular gun and is so tight that from the beginning you will have to break in. In a daily situation, a thumb break is not essential for a concealment holster. However, there are some circumstances, as a motorbike ride, jogging, horseback riding etc., where you need a thumb break for a gun to stay safely in.

Modern form-fitting holsters and sheaths have greatly reduced the necessity of a thumb break retaining device.
