= Custodian helmet =

Helmet from the United Kingdom

The custodian helmet used by the Metropolitan Police Service in London

The custodian helmet is a type of helmet worn predominantly by male police officers in the United Kingdom and within certain other places around the world. First used by the Metropolitan Police in London in 1870, it has been described by the BBC as a "symbol of British law enforcement". The helmet is worn by male constables and sergeants on foot patrol. A cultural icon, it has featured in films, TV series and other media involving British police.

== History ==
The custodian helmet is the headgear traditionally worn by male police constables and sergeants while on foot patrol in England and Wales. Officers of all ranks in most forces are also issued a flat, peaked cap that is worn on mobile patrol in a vehicle. Ranks above sergeant wear the peaked cap only. However, some inspectors wear the custodian helmet, but with two silver bands around the base (to match the two pips worn as rank insignia) to denote their position.

Claimed by some sources to have been based on the spiked pickelhaube worn by the Prussian Army, it was first adopted by the London Metropolitan Police in 1863 to replace the "stovepipe" top hat worn since 1829. In 1863, the Metropolitan Police replaced the previous uniform of white trousers, swallow-tailed coat and top hat in favour of very dark blue trousers, a more modern button-up tunic and the early type of helmet which had an upturned brim at the front and a raised spine at the back, running from the bottom to the top of the helmet, which became known as the "coxcomb".

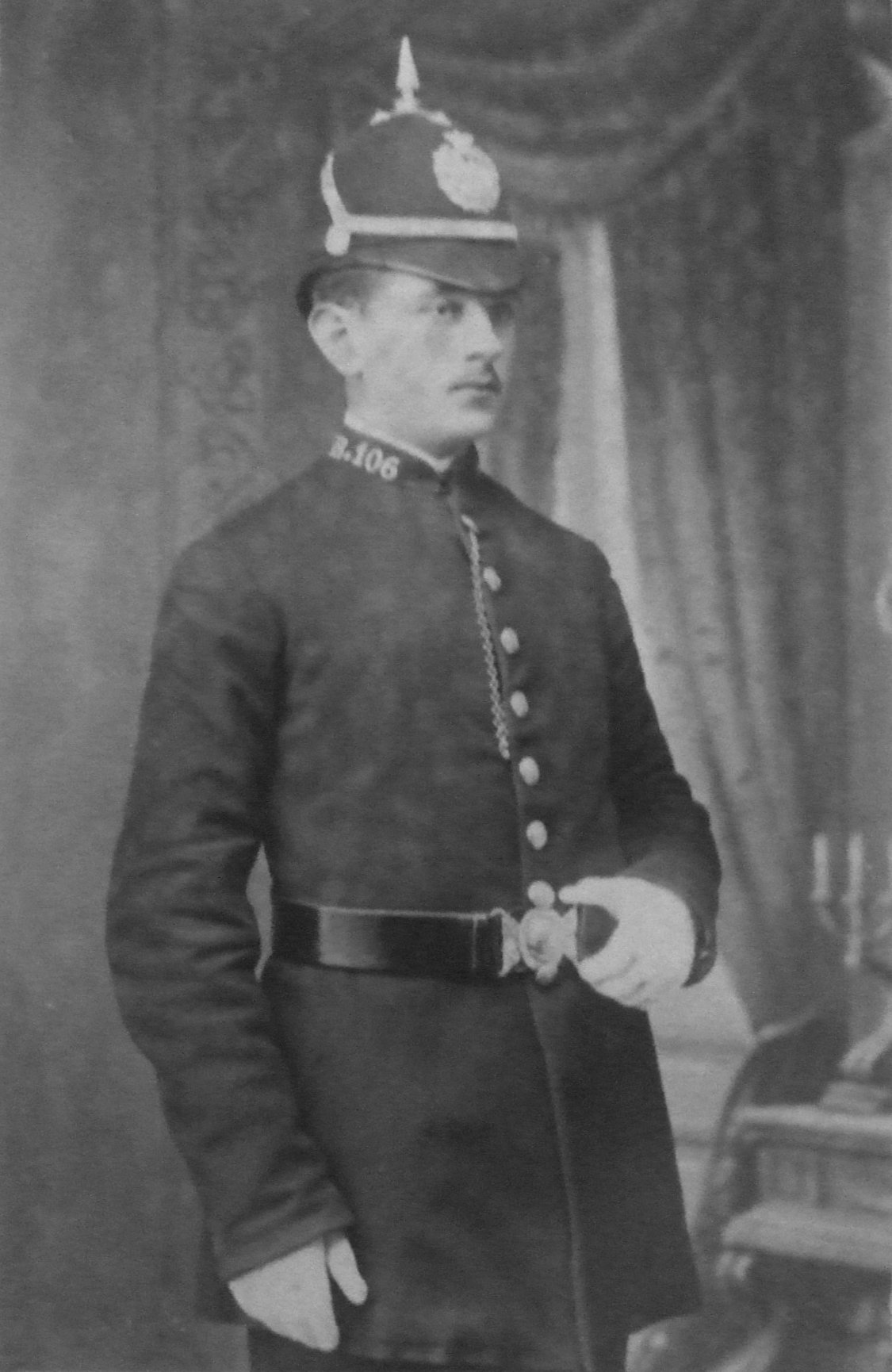
A constable of the Birmingham City Police in 1891

The early Metropolitan Police helmet had a "garter" style badge on the front of the helmet which had the officer's personal number and divisional letter in the centre, backed by a leather insert. This was surrounded by a wreath design which had the words "Metropolitan Police" around the outside and was topped with the reigning monarch's crown. This style changed in 1875, when an early version of the Brunswick star was adopted without the upturned brim seen in the previous style. There was much variety in the style of helmets during this period. The form of the helmets gradually converged with the "foreign service" and "home service" helmets adopted by the British Army in the late-1870s.

During the 1930s, the Home Office attempted to standardise the design of the helmets with the "Home Office Pattern", after it became evident that since the Metropolitan Police had adopted it and produced their own badge, many small county and borough police forces followed suit and individually adopted their own style badges and designs, which led to many different styles and designs. Some forces adopted the helmet without any badge; others designed their own, usually with the county's arms or crest in the centre. A few forces adopted slouch hats (reminiscent of those traditionally worn by the Australian military) and one wore a helmet in the familiar shape, but made of plaited straw.

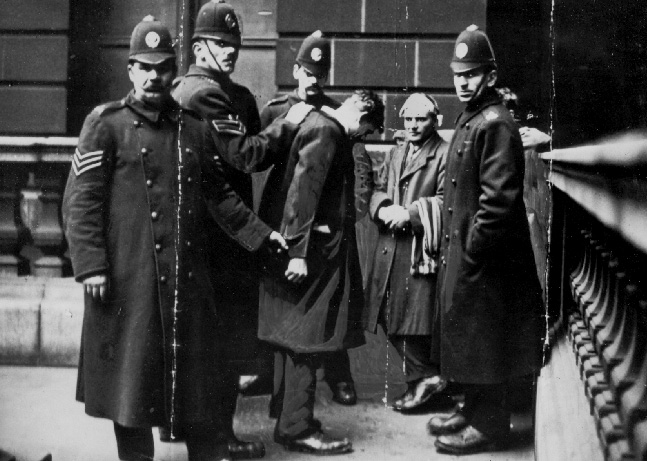
Helmets worn by Glasgow Police in 1919. These helmets are no longer in use in Scotland.

The "Home Office Pattern" consisted of a helmet with the Brunswick star badge (commonly known as a "helmet plate") which would feature the reigning monarch's cipher, with the name of the force imprinted on the plate. The top of the helmet had a "rose top", which was a raised metal rose, largely used as an ornament to cover the ventilation hole. However, this standardisation process was largely unsuccessful, with many different designs being worn by today's police forces nationally.

Until the 1970s and, in certain areas, the 1980s, the helmet internally had only a sweat band to allow it to sit correctly on the wearer's head, with a single chin strap. The helmet plate and either a "coxcomb" or "rose top" fixed to the top of the helmet, were fitted by pressing the metal lugs attached to the badges through the helmet and then having small matchstick-size pieces of wood pushed through the lugs to secure them. Other helmet furniture included a "ball top" and in some cases a "spike top".

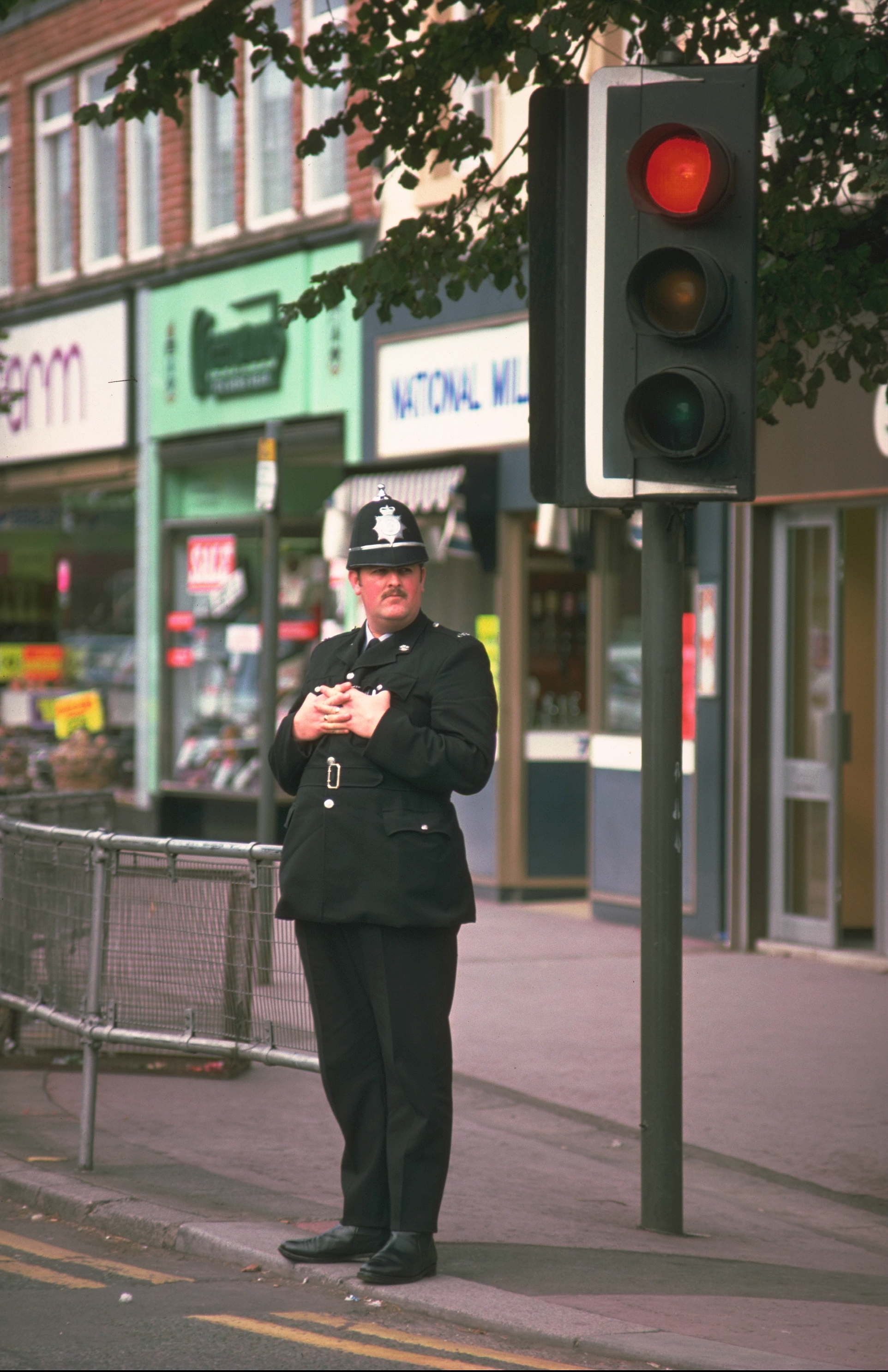
A constable of the North Wales Police in 1977

During the 1970s and 1980s, before specially adapted riot helmets were introduced, officers were expected to conduct public order and crowd control in the standard beat duty helmet. The cork construction provided little protection against attack and thrown missiles. In order to provide more protection, the construction of the helmets changed. Visually they remained the same, but instead of being constructed of cork they were now made out of a very hard-wearing plastic material and covered in felt. Internally, they were padded with foam fitted into the shell of the helmet with a webbing-style harness to allow it to sit on the head in the correct manner. Two chin straps were added at this time, a thin leather strap for normal duties, and a "public order strap" which was made of thick material and included a chin-cup to securely hold the helmet on the head. As well as these changes, helmet plates were altered so that the fixings on them were no longer lugs, but were prong-type pins which were inserted into the helmet and spread apart, so that if the helmet plate was hit by a missile, the lugs would not cause injury to the wearer. Although NATO riot helmets replaced the Custodians for public order, Custodian helmets are still currently used to control football crowds, and protests. As late as 2024, police used Custodian helmets for public order as riot gear was not available. During the London Riots in 2011, the British Transport Police and Metropolitan Police were equipped only with Custodian helmets, shields and batons. During the 2024 riots, a number of forces utilised Custodian Helmets as opposed to NATO helmets. One such force was Sussex Police where officers were deployed only with Custodian Helmets and utilised riot chin straps during unrest in Brighton.

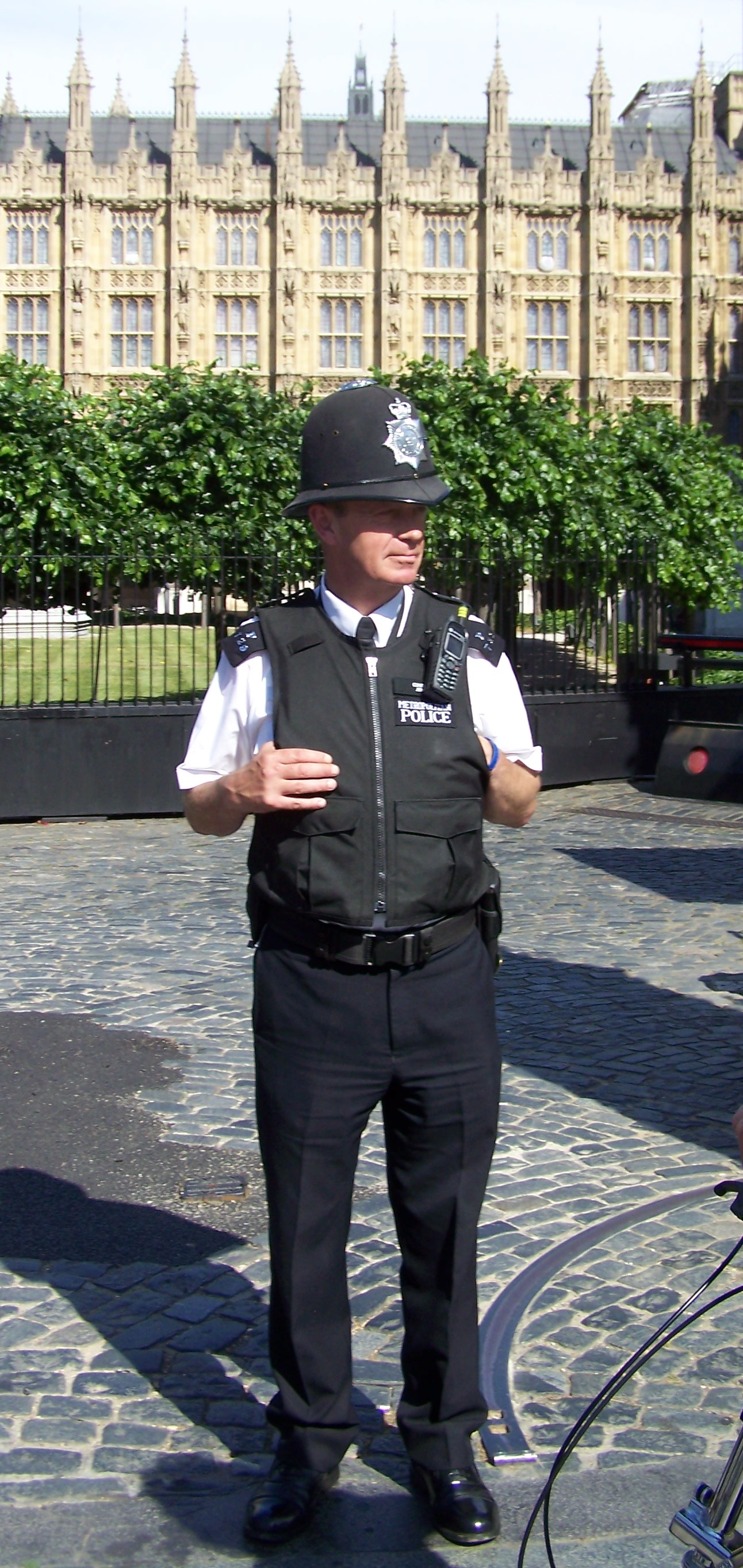
Metropolitan Police officer outside the Houses of Parliament, London in 2009

All police forces in England and Wales have their own "helmet plates" attached to the front of the helmet, most of which feature the county's coat of arms/crest or the royal cypher in the centre. Also, most helmet plates now feature parts with coloured enamel, such as the force name or crest. The additional of enamel to helmet plates started around 1985; most forces before this had plain metal ones with no or little colour. Some forces also used "night plates" for unobtrusive use at night-time, usually darkened apart from the centre, instead of metal "day plates". This practice had almost completely ceased by 1973.

Police forces in the UK did not issue custodian helmets to Special Constables up until around 1995; however, those forces retaining the helmet now issue them to all male officers.

The traditional cork construction often led CID personnel to call their uniformed colleagues "woodentops" (the name of a children's TV programme).

Police Community Support Officers only wear peaked caps, which have a blue or grey band on them rather than the police officer's Sillitoe tartan to distinguish them from police officers.

The standard equivalent for female officers is a "bowler" hat. This is shorter, chequered around the rim, and structurally reinforced to equal the custodian's protection. Uniquely, Staffordshire Police issues custodian helmets to all female constables for level 2 public order duties (and level 3 when requested). Other forces may allow individual female officers to wear custodians if preferred, but will otherwise issue them with bowlers or flat caps by default.

== Phasing out and reintroduction ==
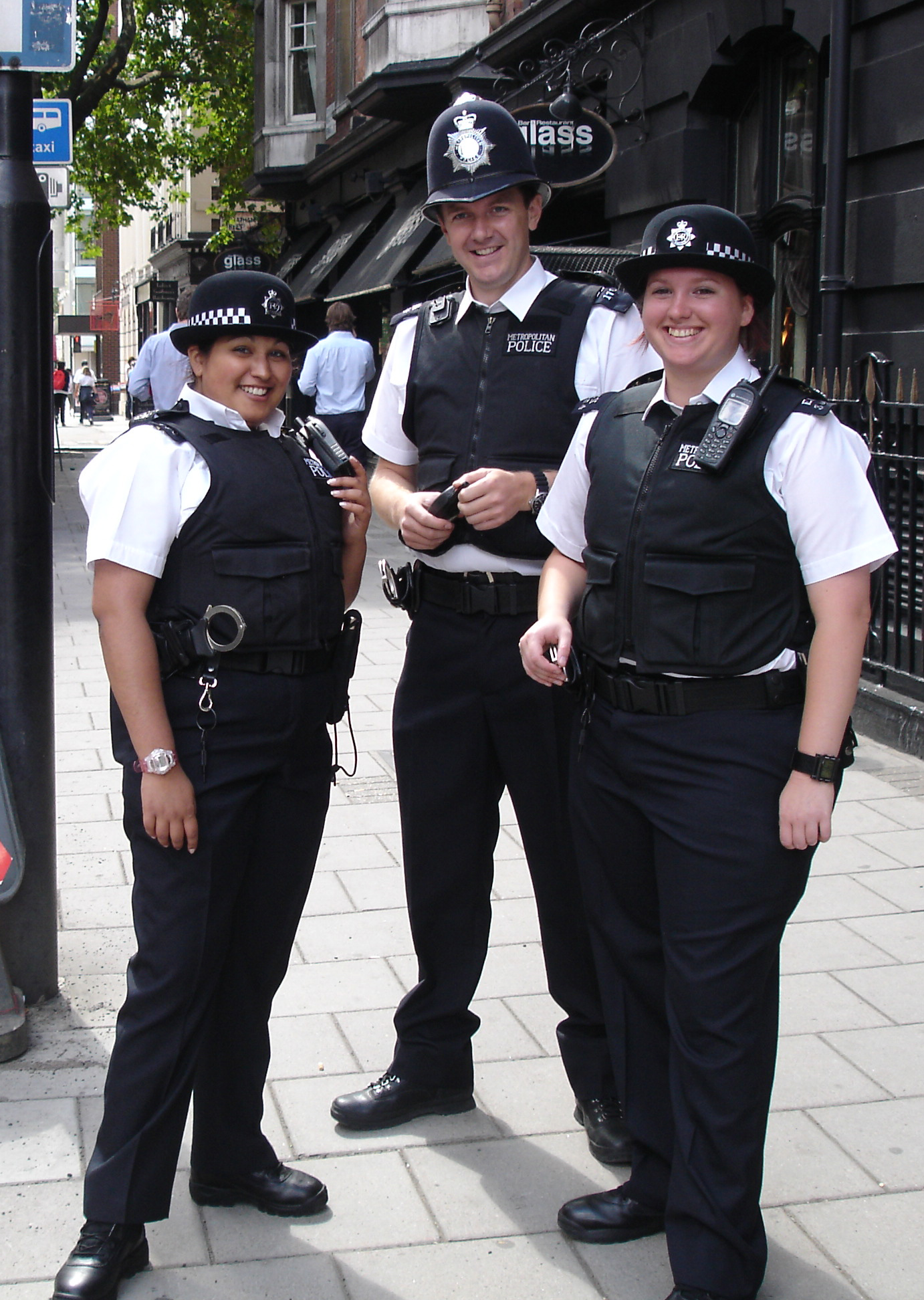
Male and female Metropolitan Police officers in Soho, London in 2007

Of the 43 Home Office territorial forces in England and Wales, 20 currently use the comb style, 18 use the rosetop style, and four use the ball style. Some forces wore spikes on top of the helmet, although these have now been completely phased out.

Since the early 1950s, helmets have no longer been worn by police officers in Scotland, but may be seen worn by Metropolitan Police officers when on Royal duties in Scotland. They ceased to be worn in Northern Ireland after the 1920s, except for night patrol work in Belfast and Derry until the early 1960s.

During 2002, attempts were made by police forces in England to replace the custodian helmet. Some forces adopted baseball caps for a very short time, but almost all reverted to the helmet or peaked cap. Humberside Police have adopted a "squat" helmet which is considerably shorter than the normal size helmets. This is currently in use.

The custodian helmet is an iconic symbol of British policing, still used by a number of metropolitan police forces, and I am delighted that they will be returning to the streets of Thames Valley.

— Anthony Stansfeld, Thames Valley Police and Crime Commissioner, 2018.

Thames Valley Police discarded the helmet in 2009 due to budget constraints but brought them back for use in 2018 following a successful trial in Reading, whereas West Yorkshire Police announced that helmets would cease to be worn after 2015 because staff found them unsuitable for normal duties. West Yorkshire Police did, however, retain the helmets for use on ceremonial occasions. Lancashire, Cheshire and Gloucestershire Constabularies announced in February 2017 that as part of uniform changes their custodian, bowler and peaked caps were to be replaced by unisex reinforced baseball caps, known as "Bump Caps". A small number of the traditional headdresses were retained for ceremonial occasions.

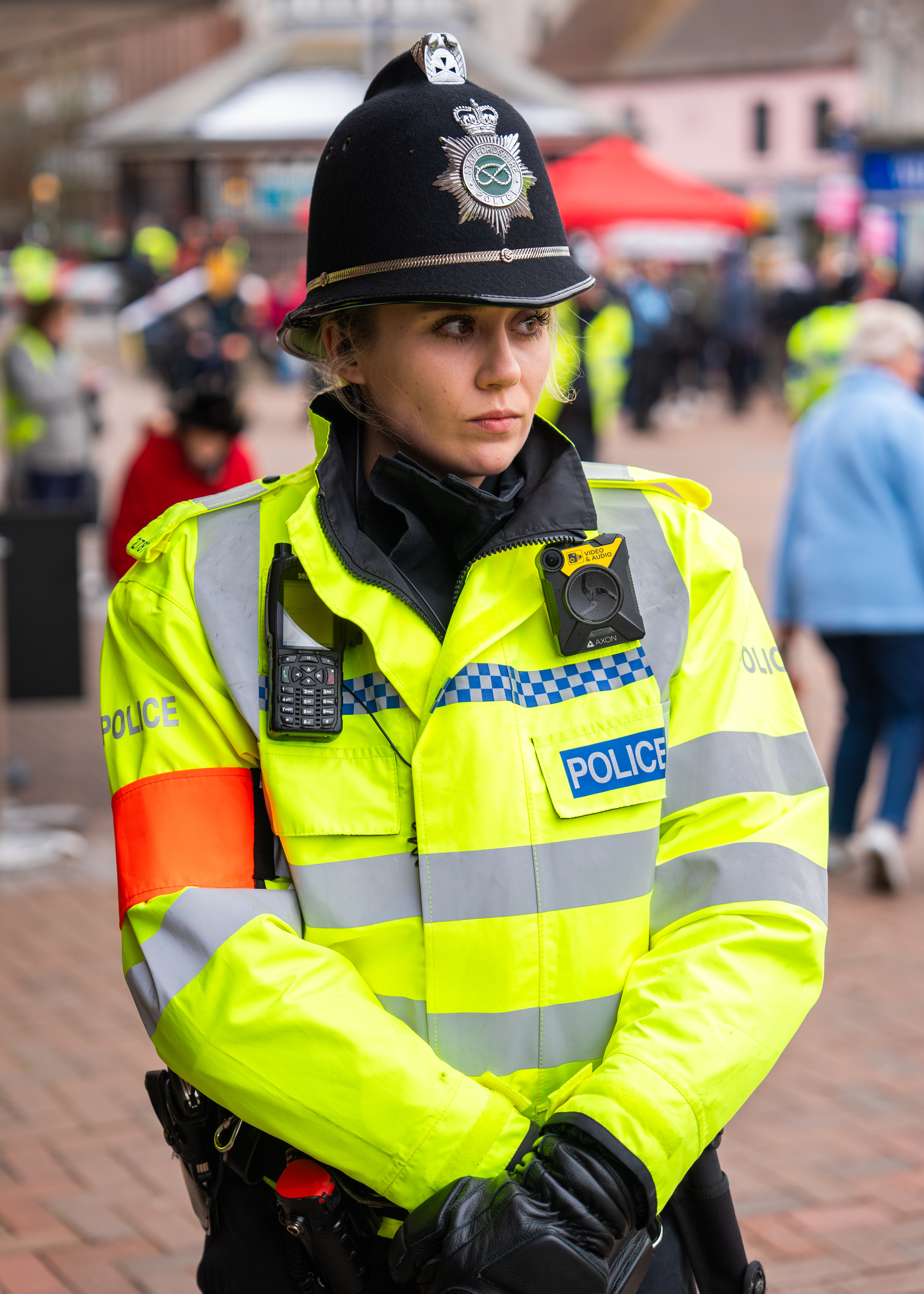
Female Staffordshire Police officer wearing a "coxcomb" helmet in 2023

In 2006/7 Gwent Police and North Wales Police replaced all headgear in favour of baseball caps. In 2010/12 the two forces announced that peaked caps and helmets would return as baseball caps were seen as unprofessional and difficult for the public to see and recognise as police headgear. This change to revert to wearing helmets led to all forces in Wales to continue wearing the custodian helmet.

Greater Manchester Police attempted to phase out custodian helmets around 2011/12 in favour of peaked caps. A few months later the custodian helmet was brought back and peaked caps were no longer issued to officers below the rank of Inspector. This meant that the custodian was the only headgear worn by constables and sergeants at that time. However, since 2017 peaked caps and custodian helmets have both been issued for use on patrol.

Northamptonshire Police and Leicestershire Police both replaced custodian helmets with gender-neutral caps in 2017, but later reinstated them in 2019 and 2022 respectively.

Cheshire Constabulary reinstated Custodian Helmets in 2024 in an effort to increase high visibility policing. The move received "overwhelmingly positive" comments from the public. Superintendent Adam Ross, Force Commander at Warrington said "as well as being practical and distinctive they also form part of our rich history and what the public expects the Police to look like".

Of the 43 territorial police forces in England and Wales, 40 are currently using the custodian helmet.

== Description ==
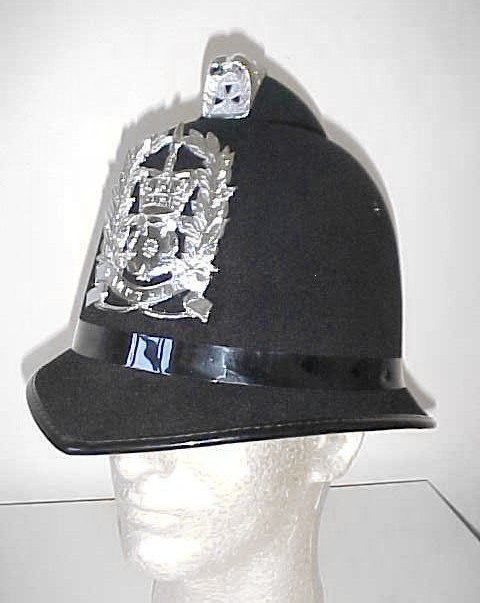
Crest-type custodian helmet, with the Hampshire Constabulary's atypical badge

Both chin straps can be folded up inside the helmet when not in use for more strenuous activity. Most officers choose not to use the chin strap for day-to-day duties.

All forces except the City of London Police, Hampshire Constabulary and West Mercia Police use the Brunswick star as the basis for their helmet plate. The helmet worn by members of the Isle of Man Constabulary is white, rather than blue, and officers of the States of Jersey Police on duty in St Helier wear white helmets during the summer months.

== Production ==
In modern production, hat makers take approximately 30 minutes to complete a single custodian helmet, all of which are made by only four companies: Hobson and Sons (London) Ltd; Christys, of Stockport; Compton Webb (C.W. Headdress Limited), of Oxfordshire; and Helmets Limited, of Wheathampstead.

The initial process begins with the making of the helmet shell using a vacuum forming machine and a metal mould. A sheet of black fortified plastic is heated and then lowered over the mould, where a vacuum pulls the plastic into shape over the mould. Once hardened instantly, a rubber mallet is used to release the plastic from the mould so that the excess plastic around the brim of the helmet can be trimmed with a bandsaw and sanded. The helmet's fabric covers are made out of water-repellent wool that are cut in halves and stitched together to give the helmet a distinctive centred, front-to-back seam. Moving down the line of production, glue is applied to both the inside of the fabric cover and the outside surface of the helmet shell, the fabric cover is then steamed and stretched tightly over the shell to prevent buckling. A wooden tool is carefully used to smooth away any air bubbles as well as to ensure the fabric cover is in full contact with the helmet shell; excess fabric is cut away.

Now halfway through production, the helmet is left to dry for several minutes. Once it is dry, black plastic piping is sewn around the brim of the helmet to reinforce it and give it a neater edge. For rosetop and ball helmet styles, the metal fastening prongs or screws of the chrome fixtures are dipped in chalk to mark their positions on the crown of the helmet; holes are then drilled and the fixture is secured. For comb-style helmets, the crest, which has vent holes incorporated into the design, is also fixed by prongs or simply glued into place at the top end of the comb. For all helmet styles, two vent holes are punched on both sides of the helmet and fitted with black metal grommets, making a total of four vent holes.

The adjustable head harness is made out of strips of fabric tape and foam stitched onto a plastic headband; this is then inverted so that a modern-pattern chin-strap assembly and traditional leather chin-strip can be stitched on as well. The harness assembly is lowered into the helmet and secured with an industrial stapler. Depending on the helmet style, a broad plastic band, narrow black metal band, narrow chrome metal band, or broad chrome metal band is wrapped around the helmet and pinned down, concealing the staples. For additional protection, a sponge liner is tucked into the helmet.

Near the end of production, a hole is drilled on the front end of the helmet and an appropriate police helmet plate is screwed on. The helmet then is sized, cleaned, and inspected. Finally, the helmet is labelled and given a good brush to bring up the pile. It is then ready to be shipped on to an awaiting police force.

== Pop culture ==
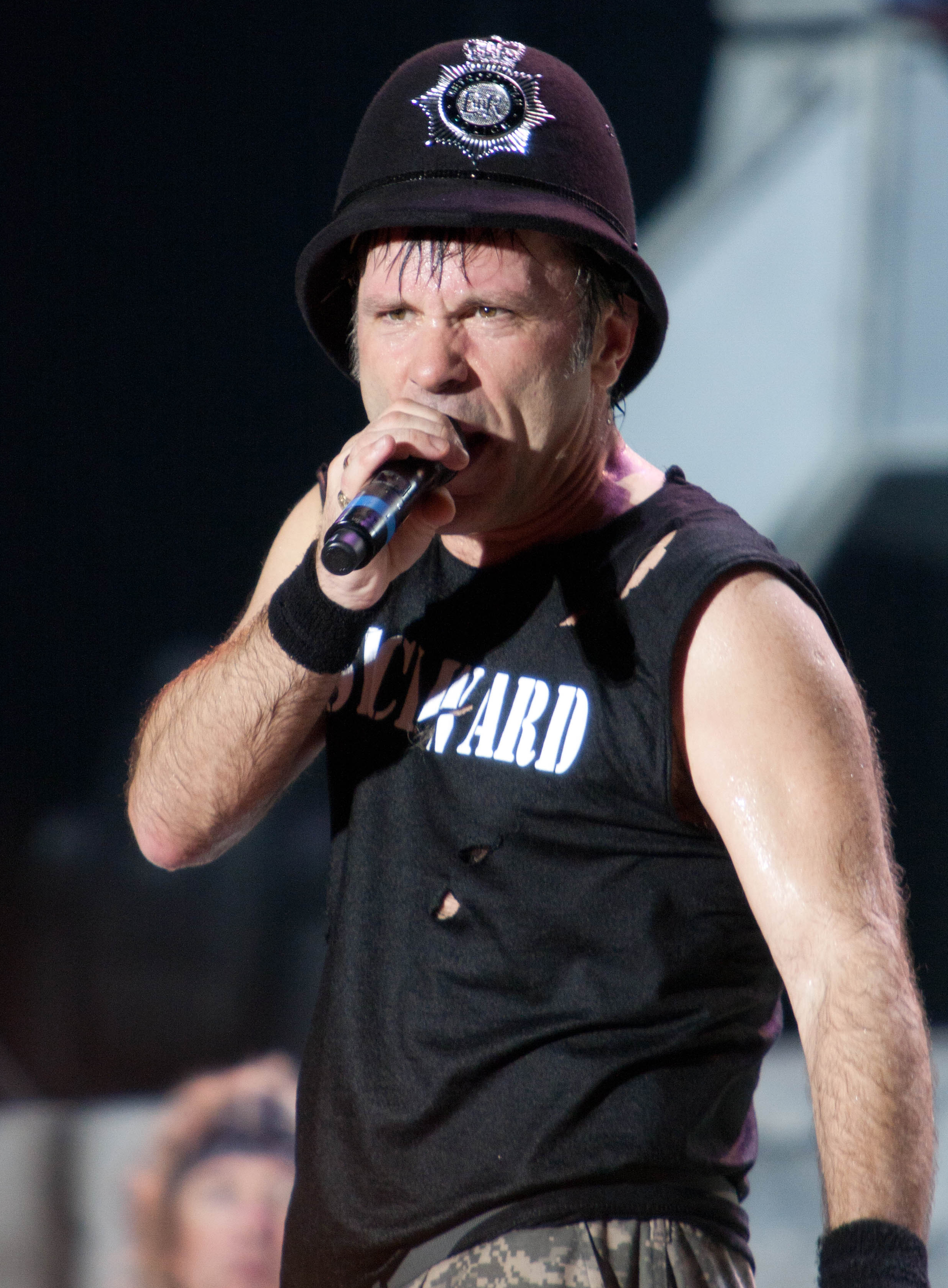
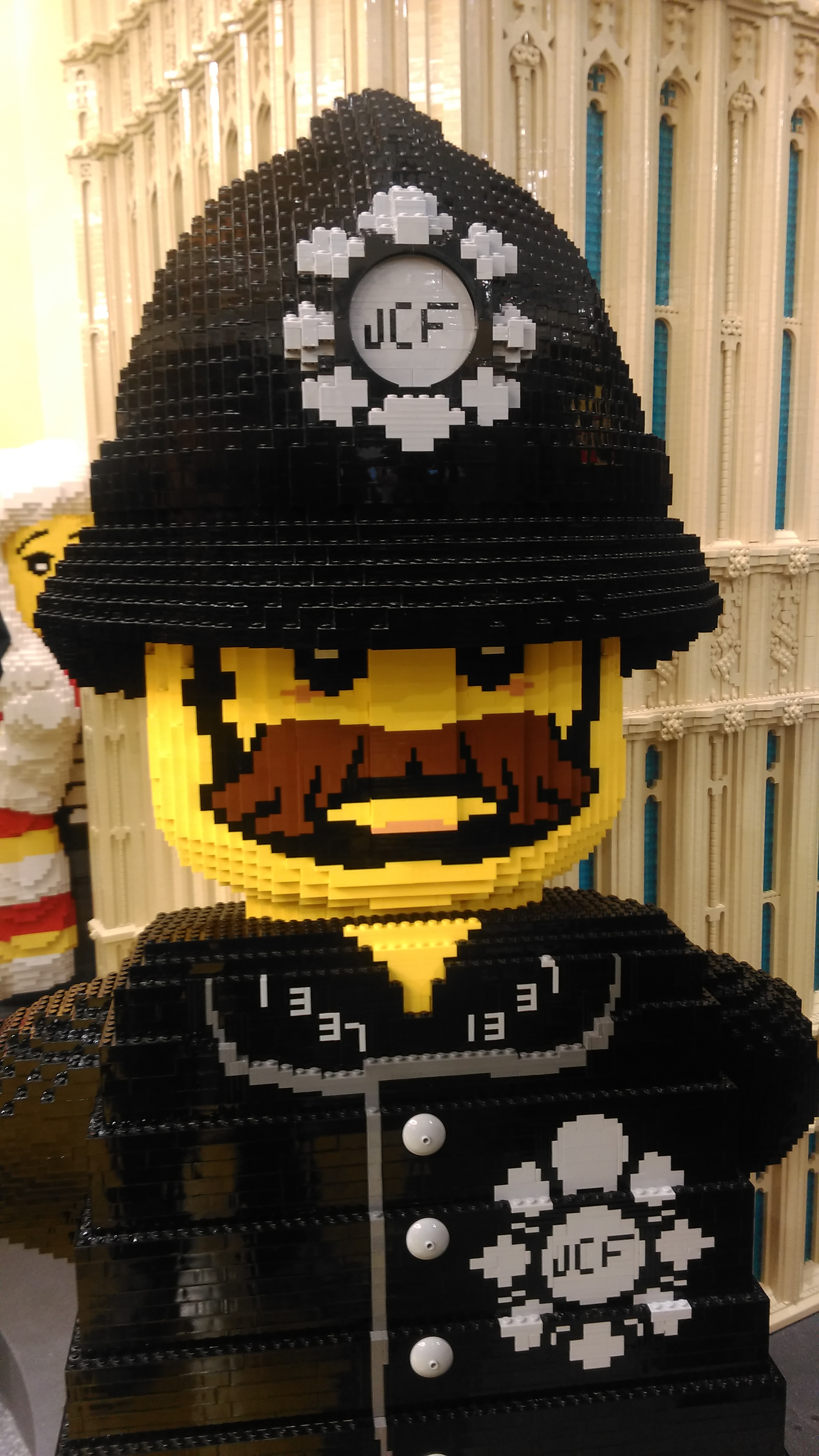
Left: Iron Maiden vocalist Bruce Dickinson during a concert. Right: a Lego statue of a police officer at the Lego store in Leicester Square, London

A cultural icon, the custodian helmet has featured in films, TV series and other media involving British police such as The Bill and The Thin Blue Line. Often playing minor characters, in the UK they have appeared in kids shows such as Thomas the Tank Engine & Friends and Fireman Sam, television comedy shows such as The Benny Hill Show, The Young Ones and Monty Python's Flying Circus (the latter including "The Funniest Joke in the World" sketch), and critically acclaimed films including The Ladykillers (1955), Hot Fuzz (2007) and Paddington (2014). Appearing as minor characters in international media (such as Mary Poppins (1964) and Sherlock Holmes (2009)), constables on foot patrol wearing their custodian helmet have also appeared in the background of shots to indicate a traditional British setting (much like other features unique to a British street such as the red telephone box, the red double-decker bus or a black taxi which have been used as an establishing shot for London). Dressed as a constable when introducing Queen on stage at Live Aid in 1985, comedian Mel Smith undoes the chin strap before removing his helmet and shouting into the mic, "her majesty, Queen!"

== Use in the Commonwealth ==
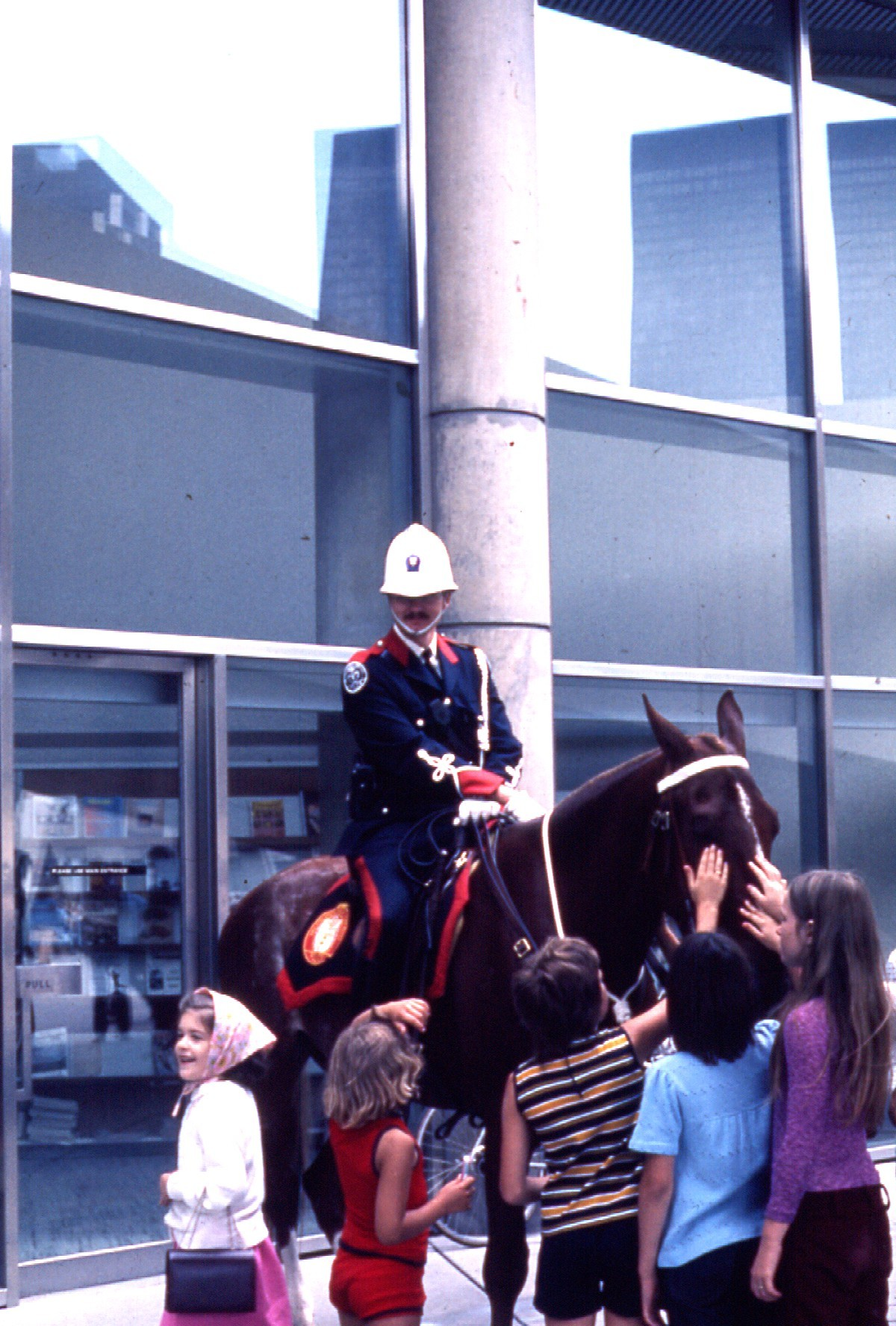
White colonial variant worn by a Metro Toronto Police mounted officer outside Toronto City Hall in 1975. This helmet is now only used by members of Toronto Police Chief's Ceremonial Unit

Helmets closely following the British model were widely worn by the police forces of Canada, Australia and New Zealand from the late nineteenth century on. These were eventually discarded as being inconvenient to wear when in vehicles or providing insufficient protection from the sun when on foot patrol. The "bobby helmet" was replaced by a pith helmet for police in Victoria, Australia from 1947, as well by a cap.

The New Zealand Police retained a white version of the custodian helmet until 1995, when it was replaced by Forage caps and more recently baseball caps. The white helmet was also used by the Samoa Police, who still make limited use of it. The Toronto Police Service discontinued regular use of the helmet in 1945 in favour of a forage cap but retains the white helmet for use by the Toronto Police Chief's Ceremonial Unit. The Royal Newfoundland Constabulary currently uses the helmet for some officers (usually senior) and for special events.

As well as in the UK, other forces currently using the custodian helmet include the States of Jersey Police, States of Guernsey Police Service, Isle of Man Constabulary, Royal Gibraltar Police, and Bermuda Police. The term "custodian" originated as a specific make of helmet used in Britain in the late-twentieth century. Because of this, "custodian" was never an official or unofficial name for similar helmets worn in other parts of the Commonwealth.

== Use in countries outside the Commonwealth ==
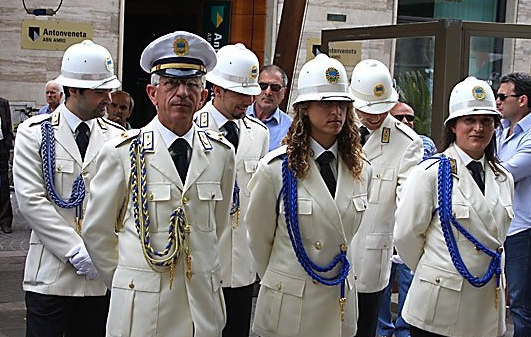
Police in Cosenza, Italy, wearing custodian helmets in dress uniform.

Certain Italian municipal police forces use a white custodian-style helmet, particularly in open air duties, such as when directing traffic.

The Monaco Prince's Carabiniers Company use a white helmet in summer and a blue one in winter.

The Portuguese Public Security Police (PSP) constables wore a custodian-style helmet from 1936 to 1958. The helmets were made of cork, covered with dark blue fabric, having on the front a silver PSP star (six points star with the Portuguese Shield in the centre). The police constables serving as traffic guards (Portuguese: polícias sinaleiros) wore a similar helmet in cork covered with white fabric for use in the summer and in aluminum painted white for use in the winter. While the general police constables' blue helmets ceased to be used, the white traffic guards' helmets continued to be used and become traditional. These helmets are still worn by the rare traffic guards that remain in the PSP of today.

Jordanian police officers in some assignments wear a custodian cover topped with a spike and incorporating a cloth shade for the back of the neck.

=== Past uses in these countries ===
Until the mid-20th century, British-style helmets were in use with the municipal police forces of several Dutch cities, most notably The Hague.

Some early uniforms in the United States police forces had variants of a helmet. The Pennsylvania State Police incorporated a cloth covered helmet, manufactured in England. The New York Police Department used a helmet, grey for summer and blue for winter from 1872 to 1912, as did several other American police forces. The helmet features in the Keystone Cops films. Several photographs exist that show a funeral procession for officer John L. Briscoe in Stockton, California. Briscoe was killed in the line of duty on 5 February 1917. Some of the line officers in the procession wore a modified custodian helmet with a leather band just above the rim and a silver badge on the front.

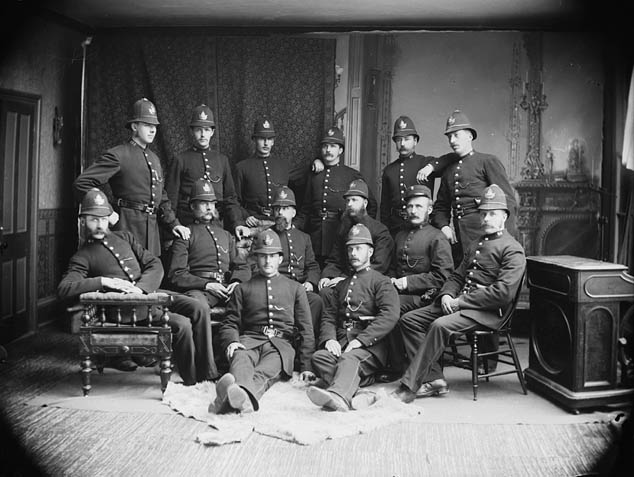
Members of the Toronto Police Force wearing custodian helmets in 1883.

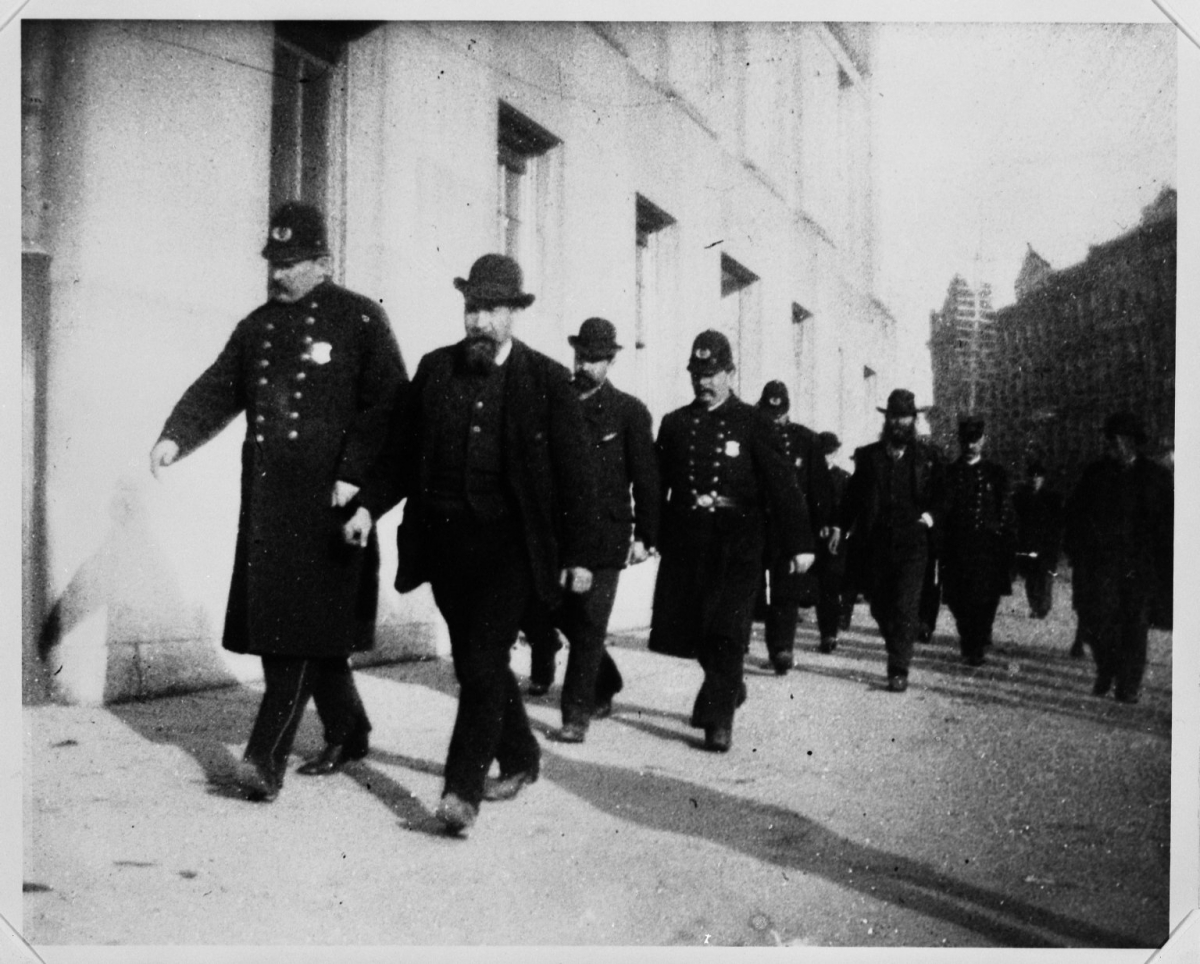
Officers of the New York City Police Department wearing helmets in Brooklyn, circa 1872–1887.

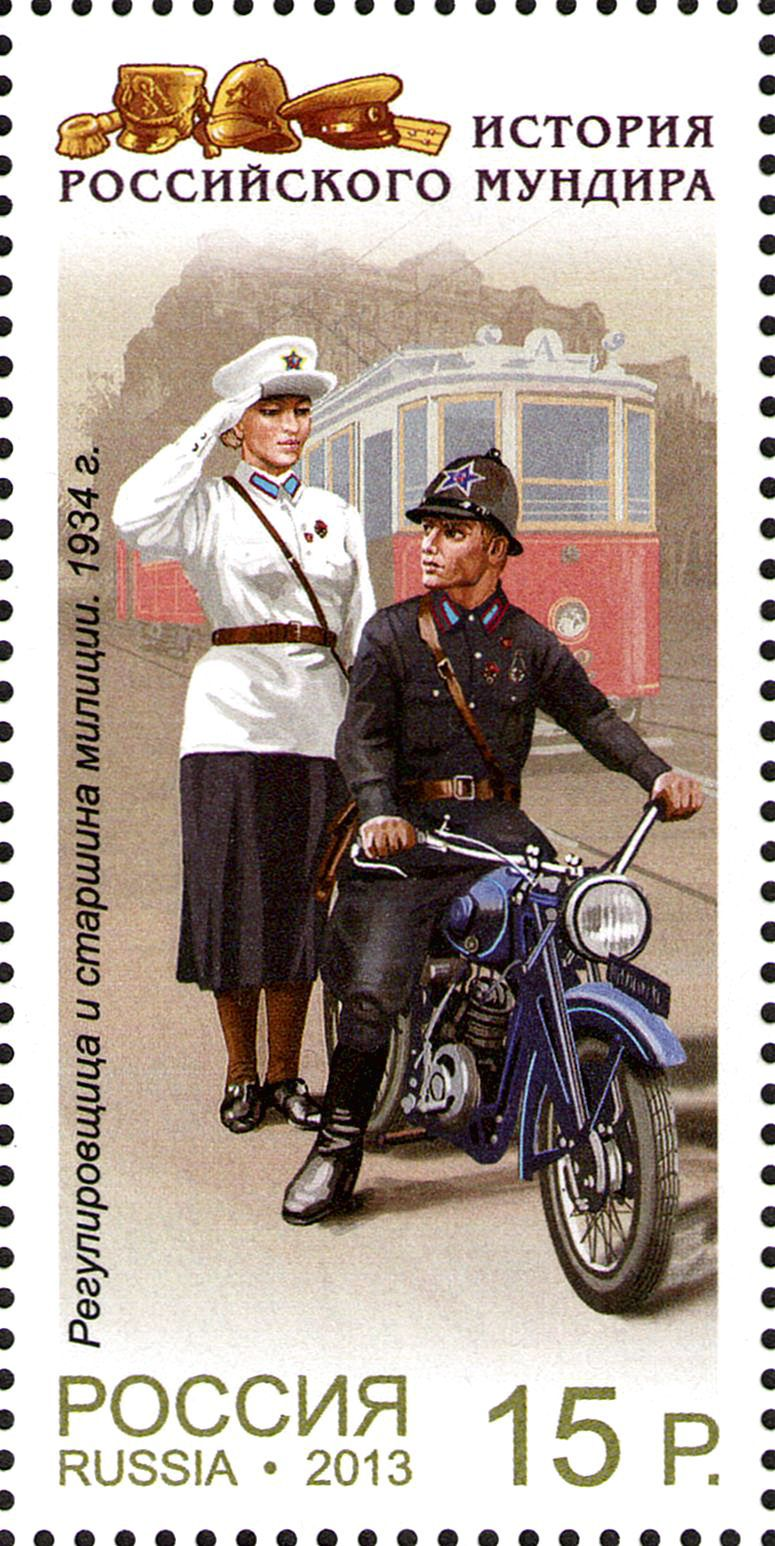
Soviet Starshina of the Militsiya in 1934, with variation of the custodian helmet utilizing the red star emblem. These appear in some Soviet films and newsreels of the time.

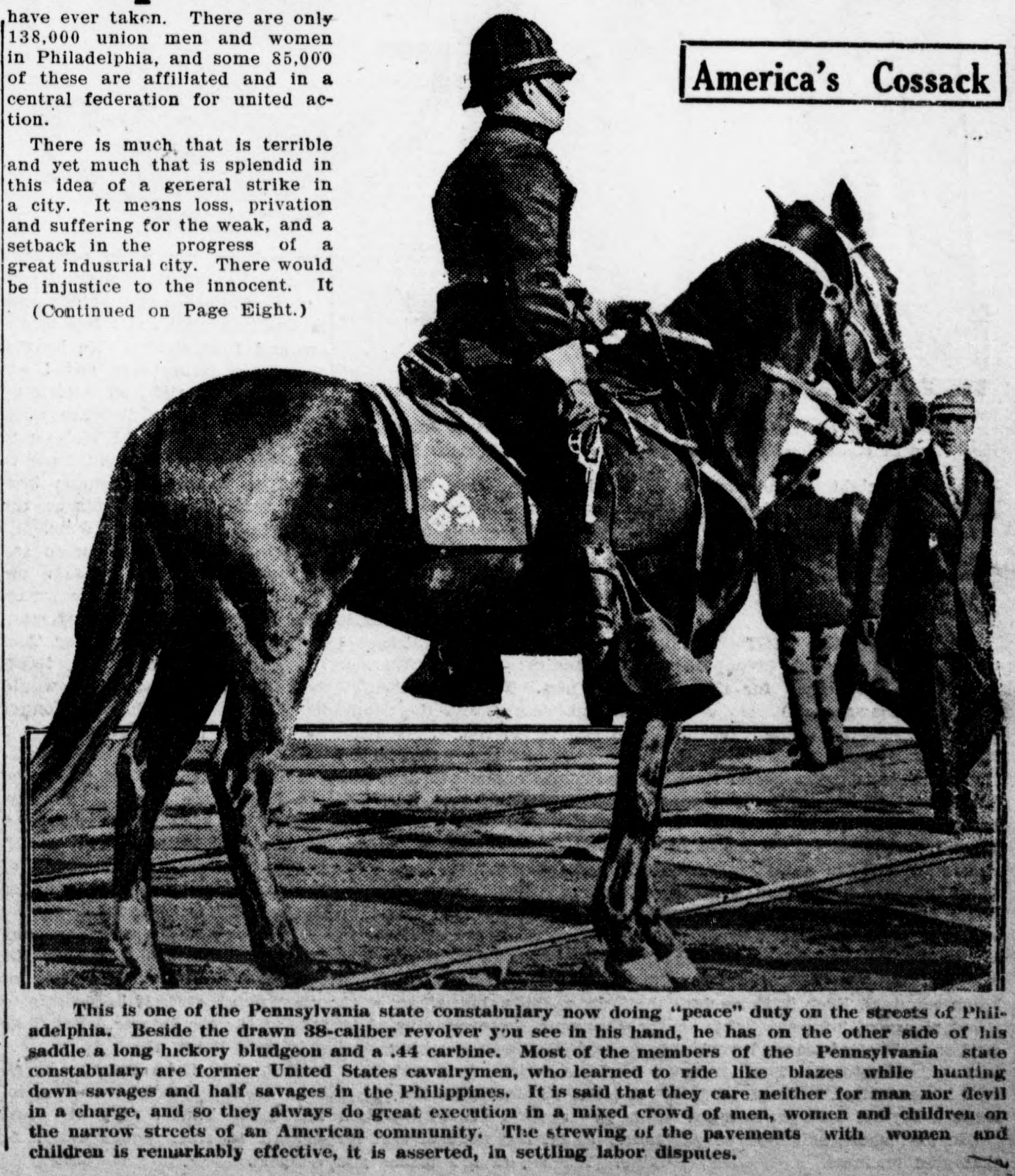
A mounted Pennsylvania State Police constable in Philadelphia with helmet, 1910.

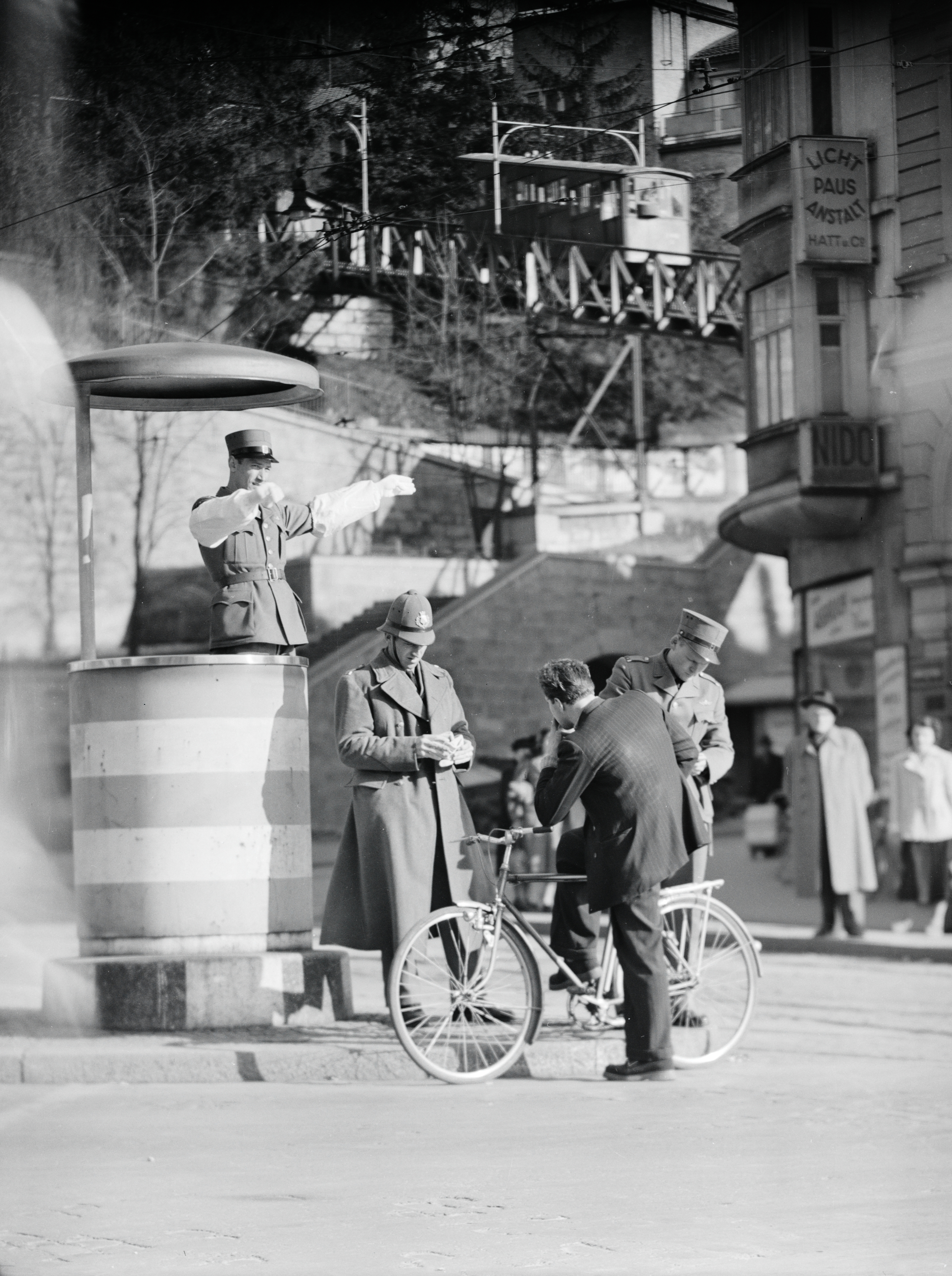
Municipal Police in Zurich, Switzerland, 1947

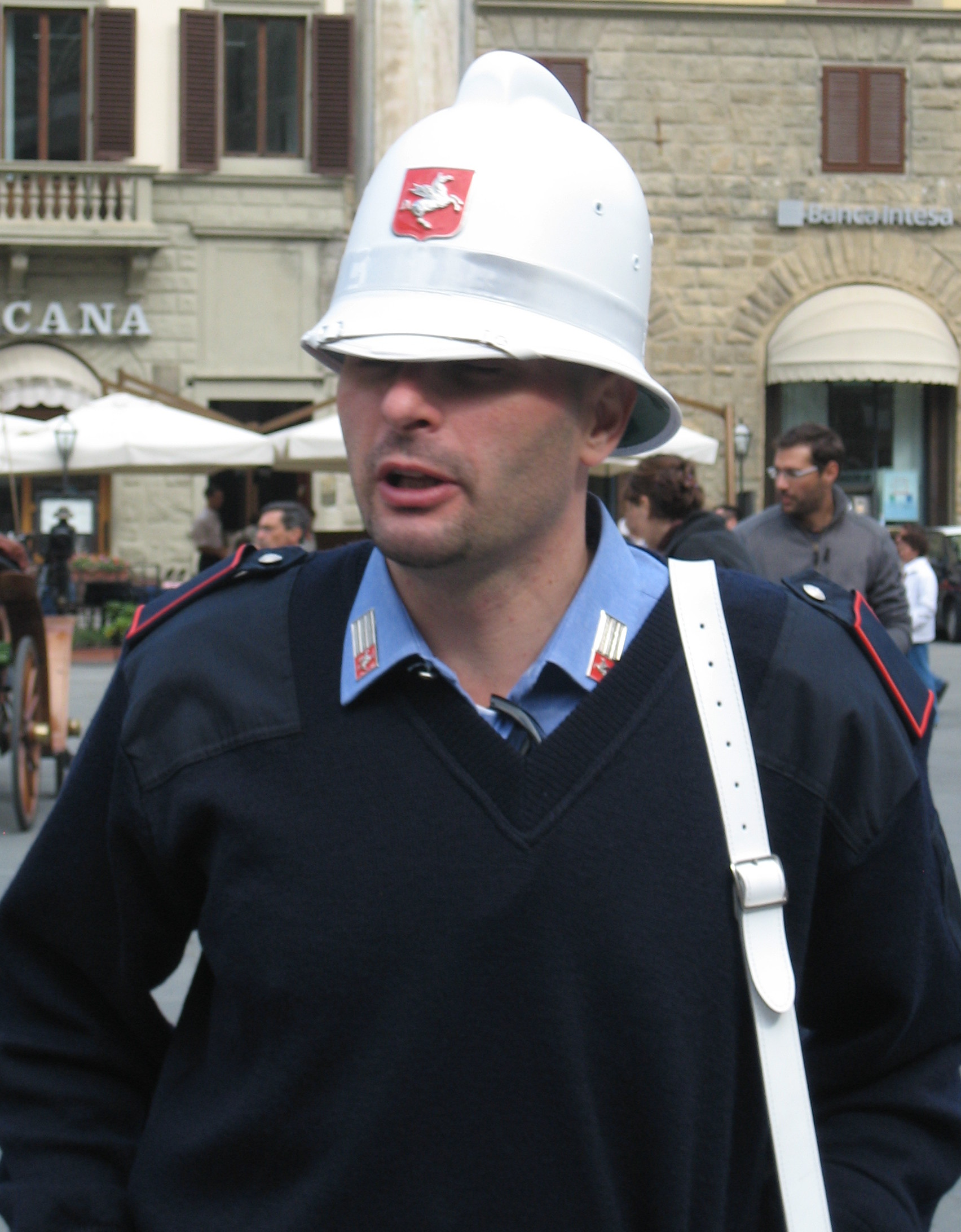
Florence (Italy) municipal police officer wearing white crest-style custodian helmet.

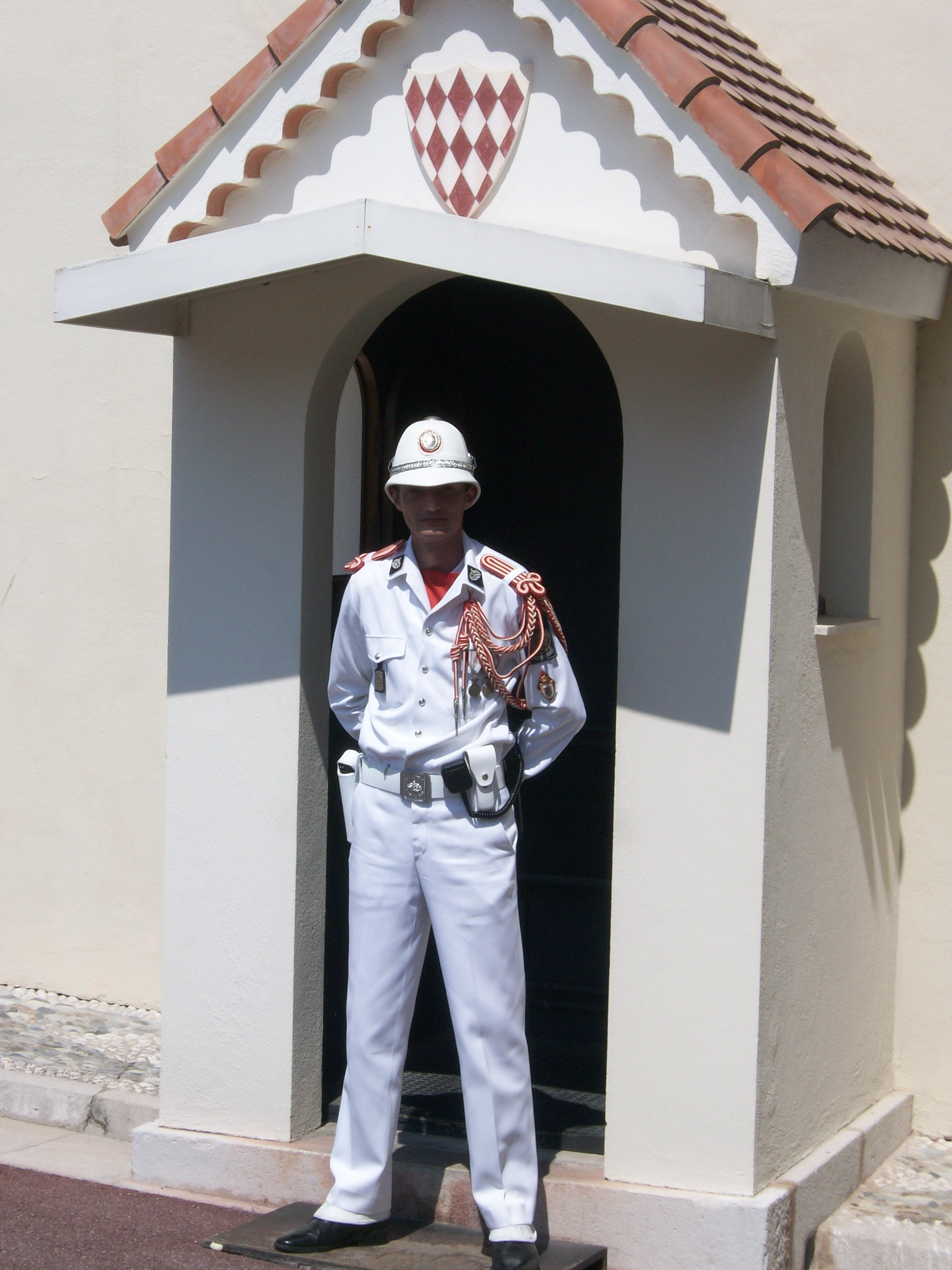
Monegasque Prince's Carabinier

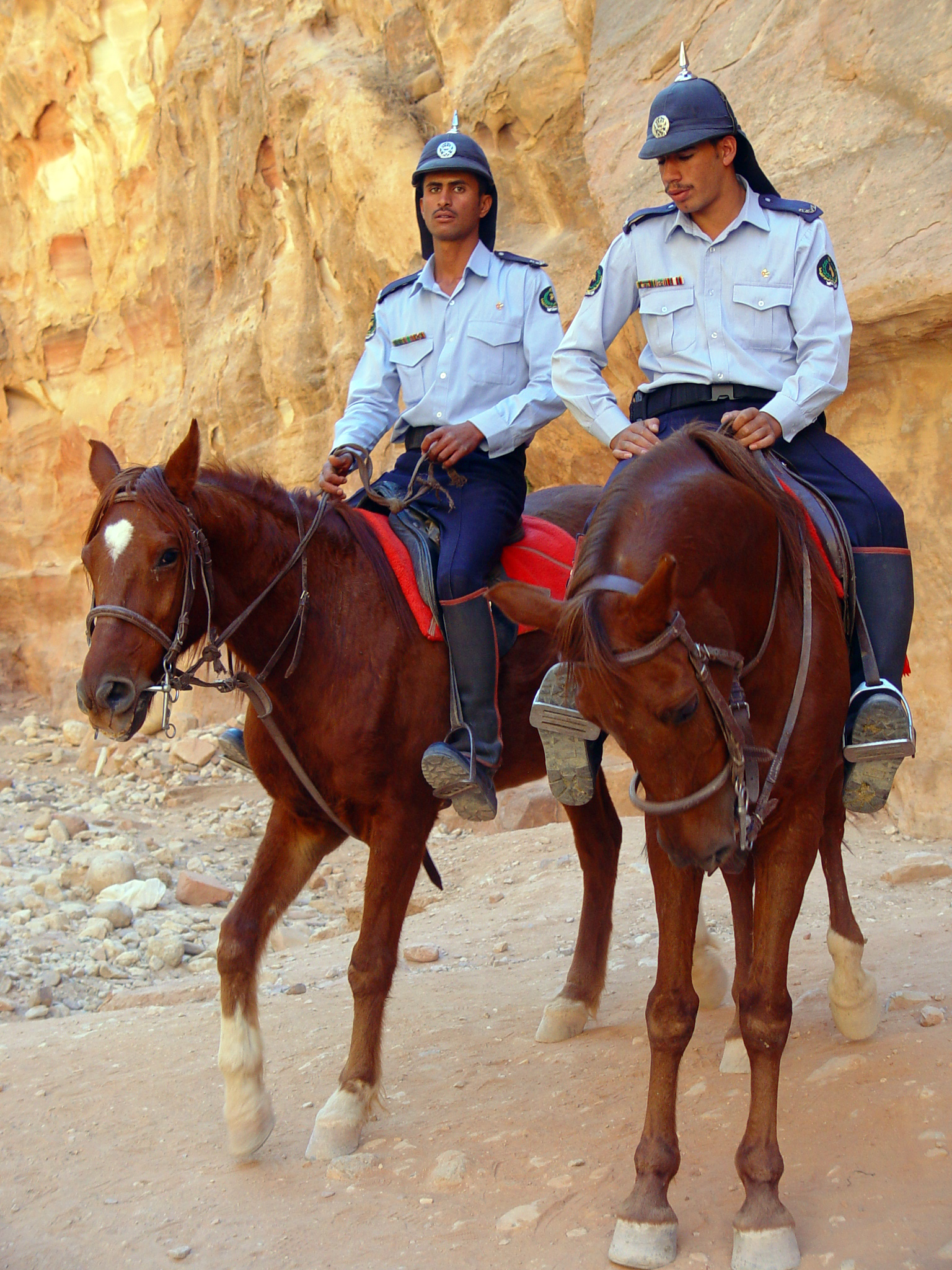
Jordanian mounted police in Petra

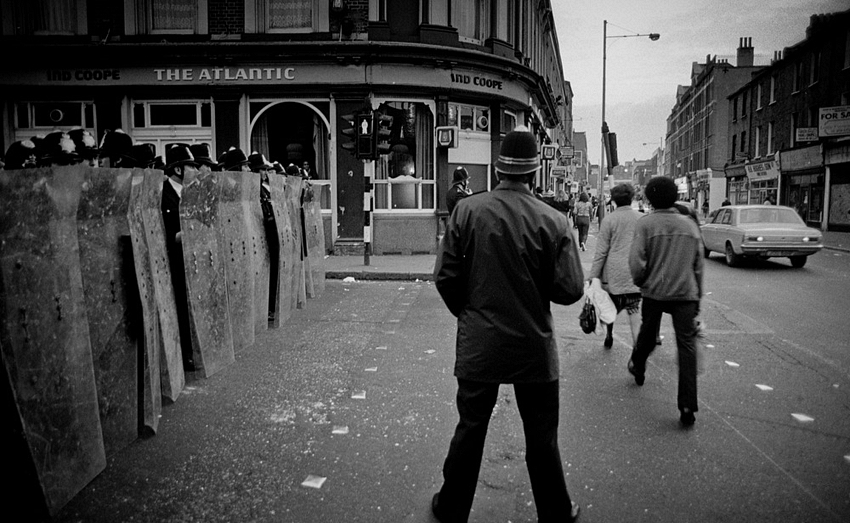
A Metropolitan Police Inspector (centre) during the 1981 Brixton riot wearing a custodian helmet with two silver bands to denote his rank

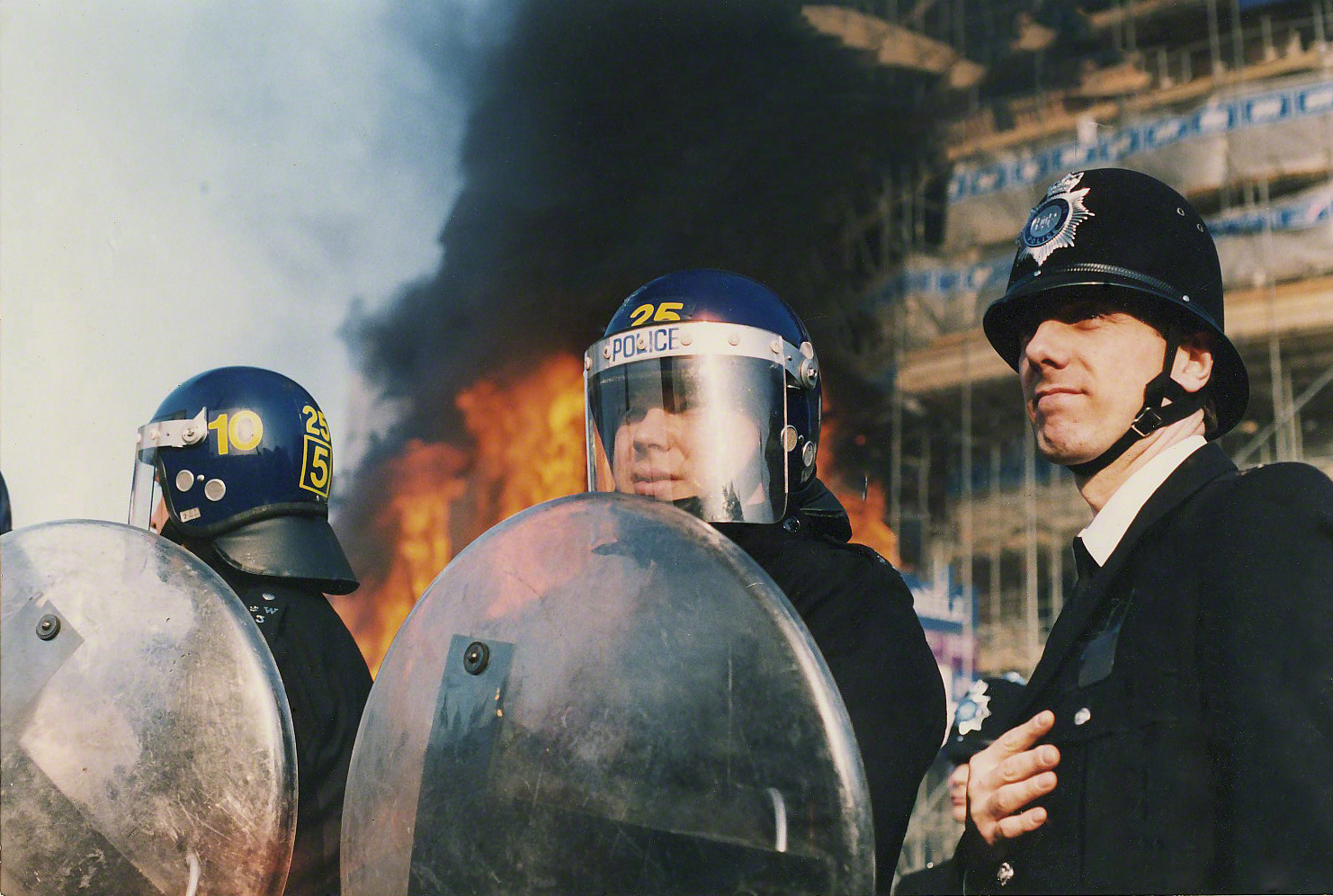
A Metropolitan Police officer wearing the custodian helmet 'public order' chin strap during poll tax riots, 1990

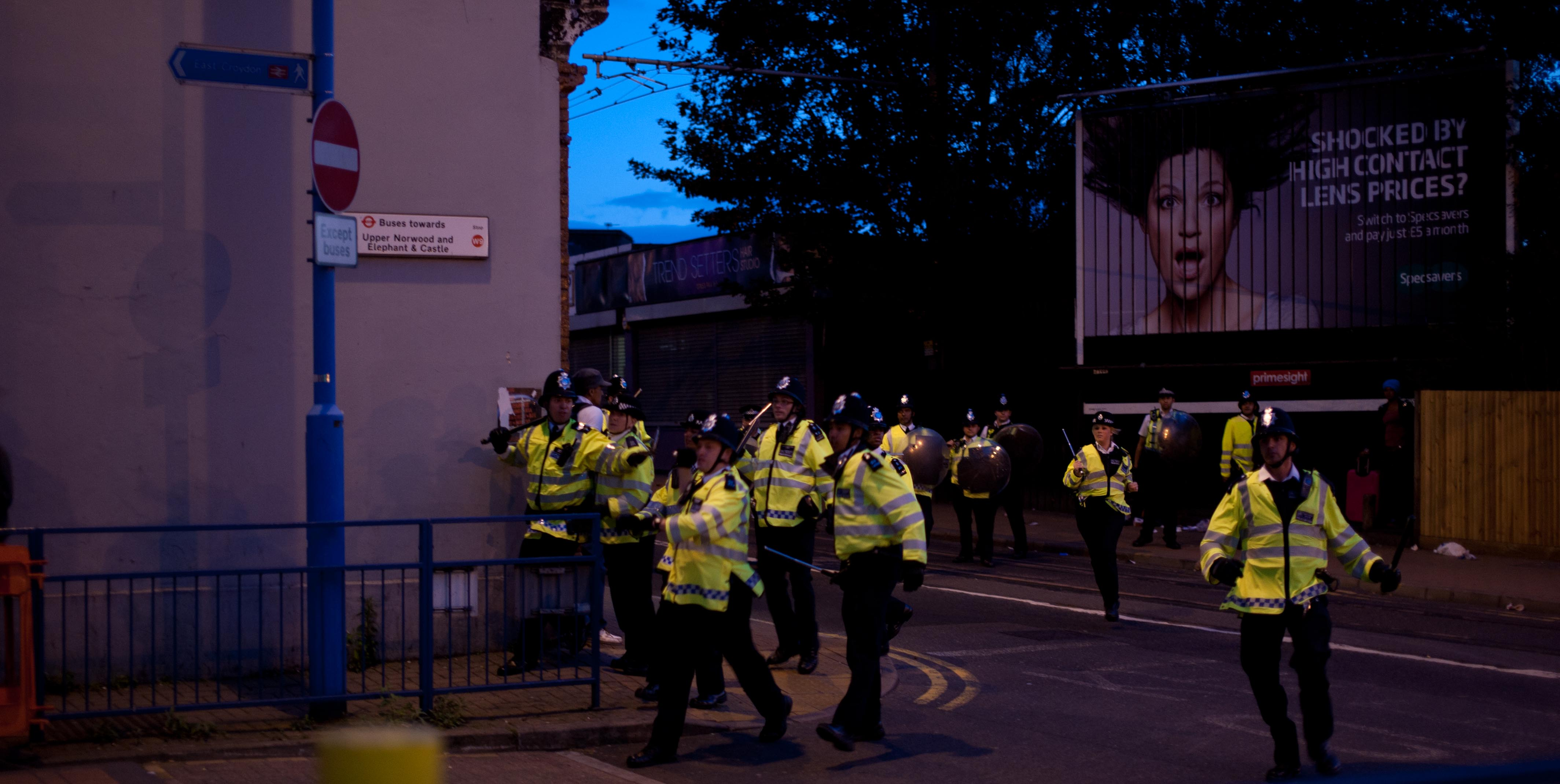
Met Police officers in Croydon during the England riots in 2011, chin straps are utilised in the event of mass disorder

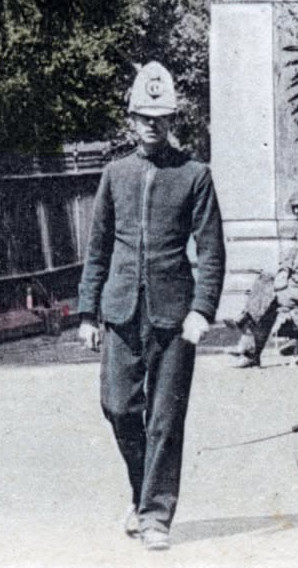
A Cape Peninsula Urban Police officer in Cape Town, Cape Colony at the turn of the 20th century.

== See also ==
- Campaign hat – worn by police forces in the US (most state troopers) and Canada (RCMP and OPP)
- Firefighter's helmet
- List of hat styles
- Peaked cap – replacement for custodian and worn by many police forces
- Sir Robert Peel
- Pith helmet
- Police uniforms and equipment in the United Kingdom
