= Police uniforms in the United States =

Standardized wear for police in the United States of America

Police uniforms in the United States vary widely due to the nation's tradition of highly decentralized law enforcement. Over time, however, a number of general conventions and styles have become representative of American police fashion. Police officers wear uniforms to establish a visible presence while on patrol, to make themselves easily identifiable to non-police officers or to their colleagues who require assistance, and to quickly identify each other at crime scenes for ease of coordination and access of resources.

== History ==
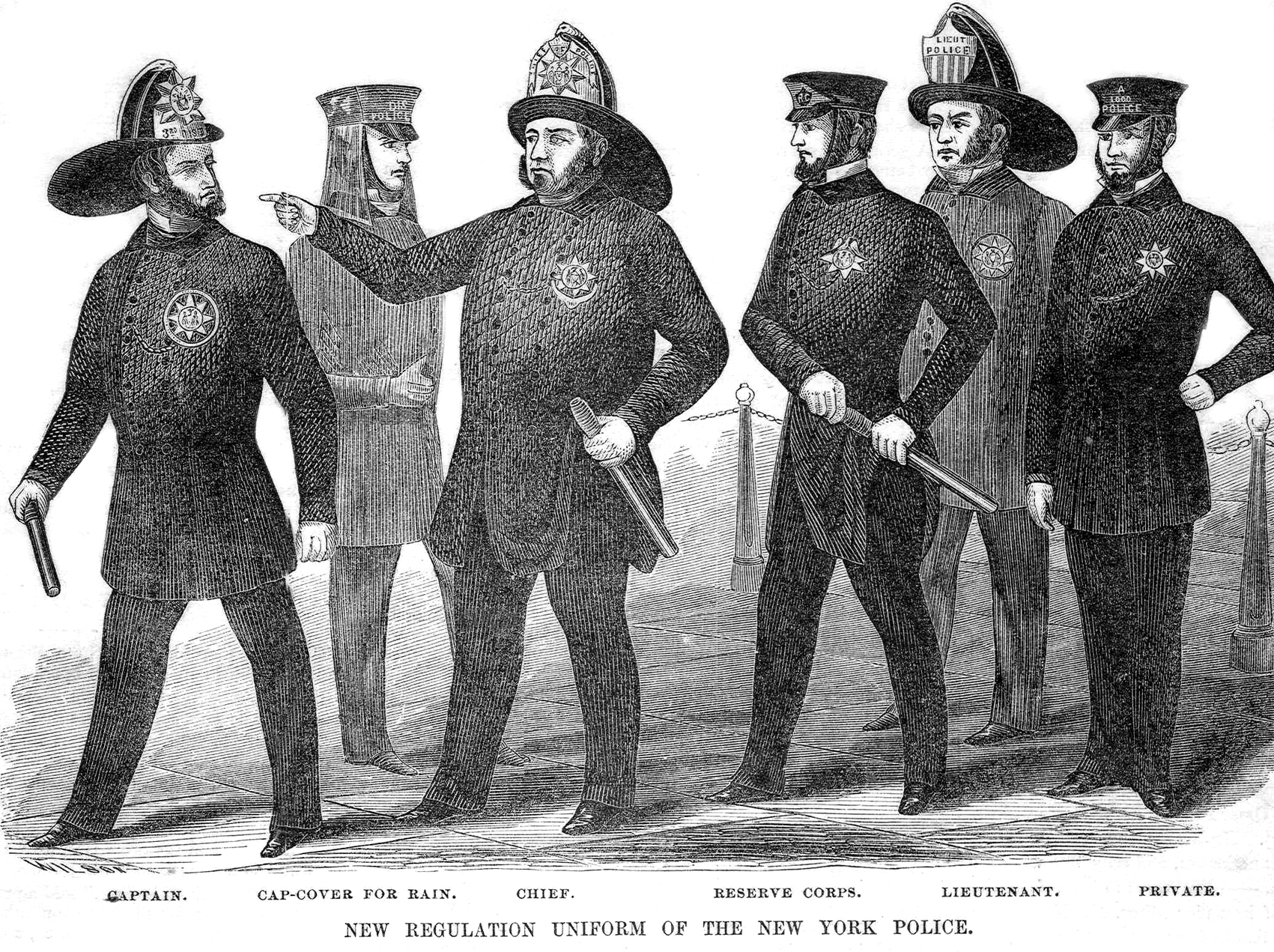
The new 1854 regulation uniforms of the New York City Municipal Police were the first and earliest police uniforms worn in the United States

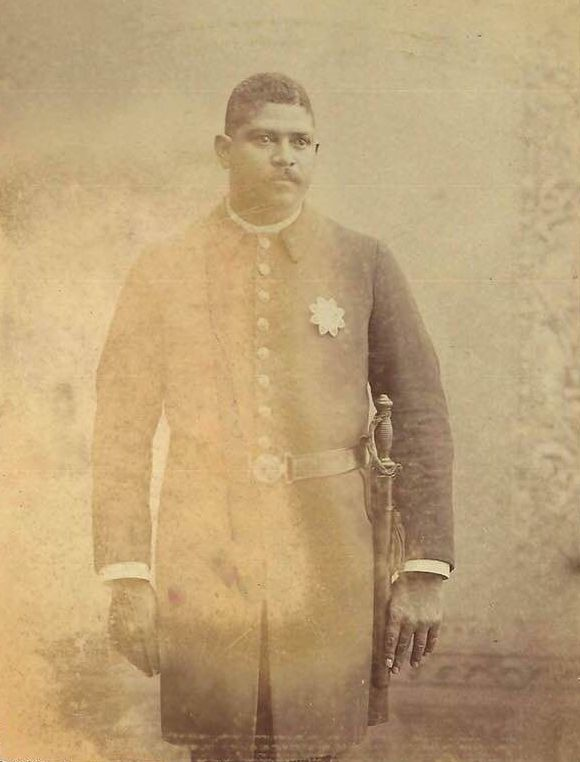
Robert William Stewart (LAPD) in uniform, 1890, with nightstick, eight-pointed badge and a belted jacket.

Centralized, municipally-managed police departments were unknown in the United States prior to the 1830s. Early law enforcement functions were largely performed by volunteer watchmen as well as elected or appointed constables and sheriffs, who were paid by the fee system for warrants they served. The advent of professional police forces in the United States foreshadowed the introduction of standardized police uniforms. While uniforms for police had been introduced in the United Kingdom as early as 1828, adoption of standardized dress in the United States took longer, with many of the new police objecting to uniforms out of concern they would be subject to public ridicule. Nonetheless, in 1854, the New York City Police Department became the United States' first municipal police force to issue uniforms to its officers. New York City was followed, in 1858, by Boston, Chicago, and soon thereafter, other cities. The first uniform consisted of a long navy blue coat with a velvet collar, and a blue cap. For officers, it was a navy blue double-breasted coat, and a fireman's style helmet. In addition to also using star-shaped badges and raincoats for the cap.

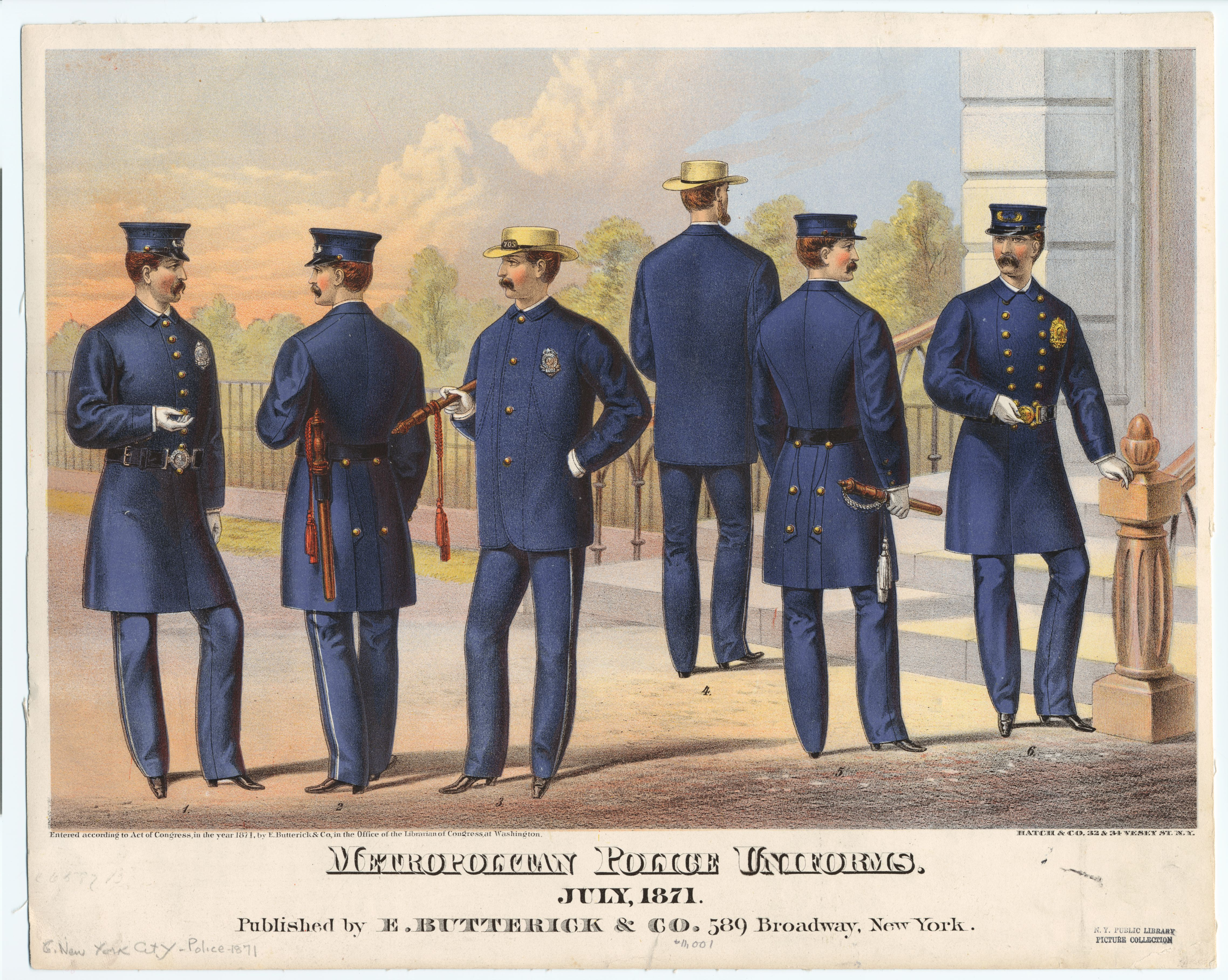
Uniforms of the New York City Police Department in 1871

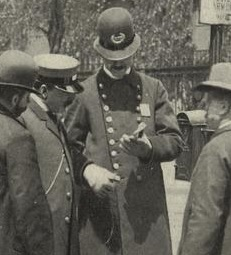
A New York City police officer, wearing a custodian helmet, answers a visitor's questions at the corner of Fulton and Broadway in 1899.

The navy blue uniforms adopted by many police departments in this early period were simply surplus United States Army uniforms from the Civil War. Headwear typically took the form of stovepipe hats, a starched woolen head cover similar in appearance to a top hat but with a squatter dimension, or British-style custodian helmets. In rural areas, where preventative policing was limited or non-existent, sheriff's deputies continued to wear civilian attire, using only their badge as a mark of identification. In many states this practice continued well into the following century. The Orange County, California, sheriff's office, for instance, did not adopt a uniform until 1938.

By the early 20th century, the style and form of American police uniforms had essentially settled into its modern pattern of collared shirts, neckties, slacks and military-style jackets with open collars, all worn with peaked hats. Many early uniforms had loose-fitting jackets that would conceal a police officer's equipment, such as truncheon and sidearm. Beginning in the 1930s, officers more frequently began wearing their personal gear on a Sam Browne belt worn outside the coat, for ease of access.

One of the biggest evolutionary experiments in police uniform design began in 1969, when the police department in Menlo Park, California moved away from typical police uniforms, opting instead for a dress style designed to better emulate civilian fashion trends and communicate a "softer" appearance. The new uniforms consisted of green blazers, black slacks, a white shirt and black necktie. Officers wore their weapons concealed under their coats. Many other police departments soon followed the Menlo Park lead. In psychological tests, it was discovered police - after using the new uniform - displayed less authoritarian personality characteristics. In addition, civilians and suspects injured during arrests by police dropped by 50-percent and assaults on officers by suspects also plummeted by nearly a third. Despite these initially promising signs, however, it was subsequently determined that other factors, including increased police recruitment of college graduates and adoption of more responsive management techniques, had probably accounted for the statistical shifts. By the eighth year of the uniform experiment, assaults on police had more than doubled from what they were prior to the dress change and the "civilian" style uniforms were subsequently dropped.

== Current designs ==
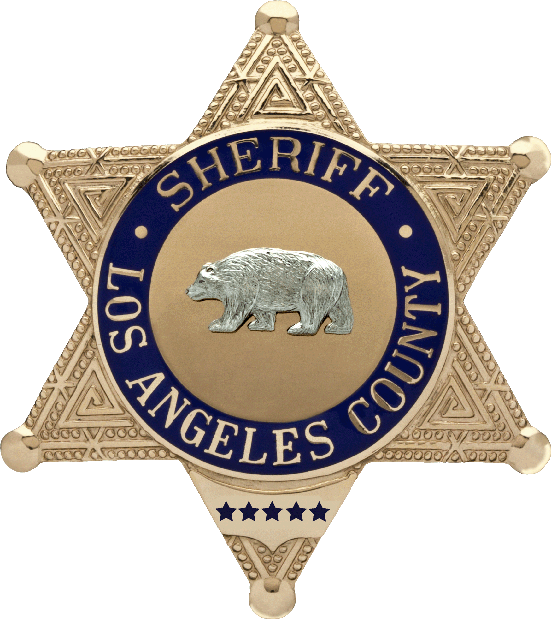
The Los Angeles County Sheriff's Office badge is typical of the six-pointed star design used by many U.S. sheriffs. The panel at the bottom of the badge is where a deputy's badge number would be engraved.

=== Badges ===
Despite the wide variety of uniforms used by United States police departments, virtually all incorporate the use of metallic badges as a means of primary identification. Unlike in the United Kingdom, where officers both in and out of uniform carry - but do not publicly display - paper or plastic warrant cards, US police badges are the official symbol of office and are prominently worn over the left chest of the uniform (or, in the case of plainclothes officers, displayed from a concealed badge carrier when necessary to establish authority). In Virginia, for instance, police only have the power to make arrests when "in uniform, or displaying a badge of office."

Badges are typically engraved with a unique identification number matched to the officer to whom it is issued. Some departments - most notably the New York City Police Department (NYPD) - traditionally pass individual badges through several generations of police so that current officers can establish a symbolic connection with the retired and deceased officers to whom their badge had previously been issued. In the case of the NYPD, officers who misplace their badge are docked five days of vacation time and many officers wear replica badges to avoid losing their issued badge (though the practice is officially discouraged).

Federal law prohibits the sale or purchase of counterfeit police badges and many states have laws regulating the wearing of metallic badges by persons other than law enforcement. Florida, for instance, prohibits unauthorized persons from wearing or displaying badges if their wear or display would be likely to deceive someone. New York, Connecticut, Massachusetts, Maine and New Jersey, meanwhile, allow private security guards to wear badges provided they are in the shape of a square and not the more traditional shield or star shape used by police.

Badges are usually constructed out of metal with an enamel finish in either a gold and/or silver. As a general rule, the badges issued by county sheriff's offices take the form of a five, six, or seven-pointed star, while municipal police have shield-like designs. Following the death of a police officer, other officers will typically cover their badges with a black mourning band. Mourning bands can also be seen worn on May 15, "National Peace Officers Memorial Day."

=== Patches ===
Most police uniforms feature shoulder sleeve insignia in the form of cloth patches embroidered with the agency's name, logo or a heraldic device. These patches are displayed either on both shoulders, or one.

=== Uniforms ===
Individual municipal and county law enforcement agencies in the United States are typically responsible for designing their own uniforms, often with minimal state regulation. As a result, there is no universal form or pattern for American police uniforms.

However, in general, most large police departments provide officers with two types of uniforms for wear, tactical (also called "Class B"), and traditional (or "Class A"). Tactical uniforms, similar in material and cut to the U.S. Army's former Battle Dress Uniform, are generally worn while on patrol, or performing physically intense duties, while traditional-style uniforms are more often used for station assignments, high-profile events, and ceremonial functions. In addition to these two basic uniform types, a variety of specialized clothing may be deployed as necessary, including jumpsuits (sometimes called "Class C") and, in the case of police pipe bands, highland dress. Many police departments restrict the use of tactical uniforms to tactical units, such as SWAT teams, or for special assignments, such as riot control, in order to present a less militarized appearance in day-to-day operations. Municipal police uniforms are typically colored in blue or black, while uniforms worn by sheriff's deputies are more often green, brown, or khaki. Unlike British police, American law enforcement agencies do not usually include white-colored apparel, such as shirts, in their uniforms due to the fact white reflects in the dark and can make police officers more prominent targets for armed criminals during building searches or standoffs. There are, however, many exceptions to this general rule; the Miami Police Department wears dark blue, bike division officers will wear white, and they may also wear polo shirts on some occasions, and senior officers in the New York City Police Department, Chicago Police Department Baltimore Police Department, Philadelphia Police Department, and Washington, D.C. Metropolitan Police Department wear uniforms that also feature white shirts. However, some departments like the Hillsborough County Sheriff's Office have white shirts as part of the universal standard uniform.

=== Headgear ===
Unlike police in some Commonwealth nations, US police forces subsequently abandoned the custodian helmet by the early 20th century they had incorporated with their uniforms. Today, municipal police forces typically wear peaked hats or, in tactical uniforms, baseball caps. County sheriff's offices often issue their deputies with campaign hats or Stetsons for cover. Some departments permit the usage of the hijab for female Muslim police officers.

=== Unique elements ===
Several United States police forces are known for unique uniform items not commonly used by other departments.

- Police uniforms in Chicago and Pittsburgh feature peaked hats incorporating the Sillitoe tartan checkerboard design, similar to taxicab decor.
- The Washington State Patrol and New Mexico State Police wear bow ties.
- Troopers of the Texas Ranger Division and Texas Highway Patrol wear cowboy hats as part of their duty and dress uniforms and cowboy boots as part of their dress uniforms.
- The Honolulu Police Department uses Kukui nut medallions on their epaulets for the ranks of Lieutenant through Major.
- Many police departments replace their standard collared shirts and neckties with an ascot when detachments are organized as part of a funeral detail or color guard. Fourragère and aiguillettes may also be worn.

== Awards ==
Since 1977, the North American Association of Uniforms, Manufacturers and Distributors have sponsored an annual award for the "best dressed" police department in the United States. The awards are currently awarded in several classes, depending on a department's size. In 2013 the Florida Highway Patrol was recognized as the "best dressed" police force among departments with more than 2,000 personnel.

== Examples of United States police uniforms ==
Contemporary Uniforms
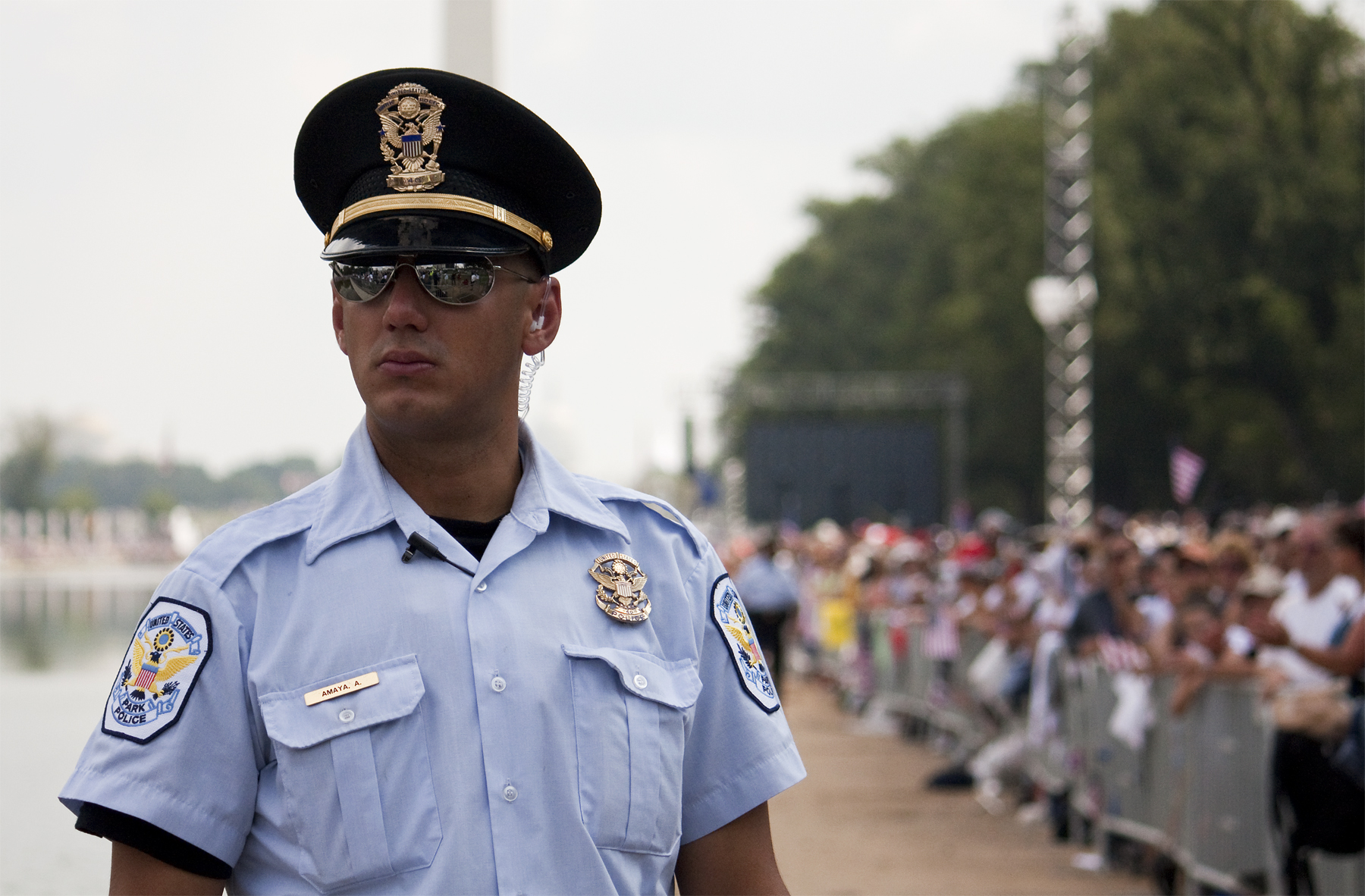
A U.S. Park Police officer in summer short-sleeve uniform

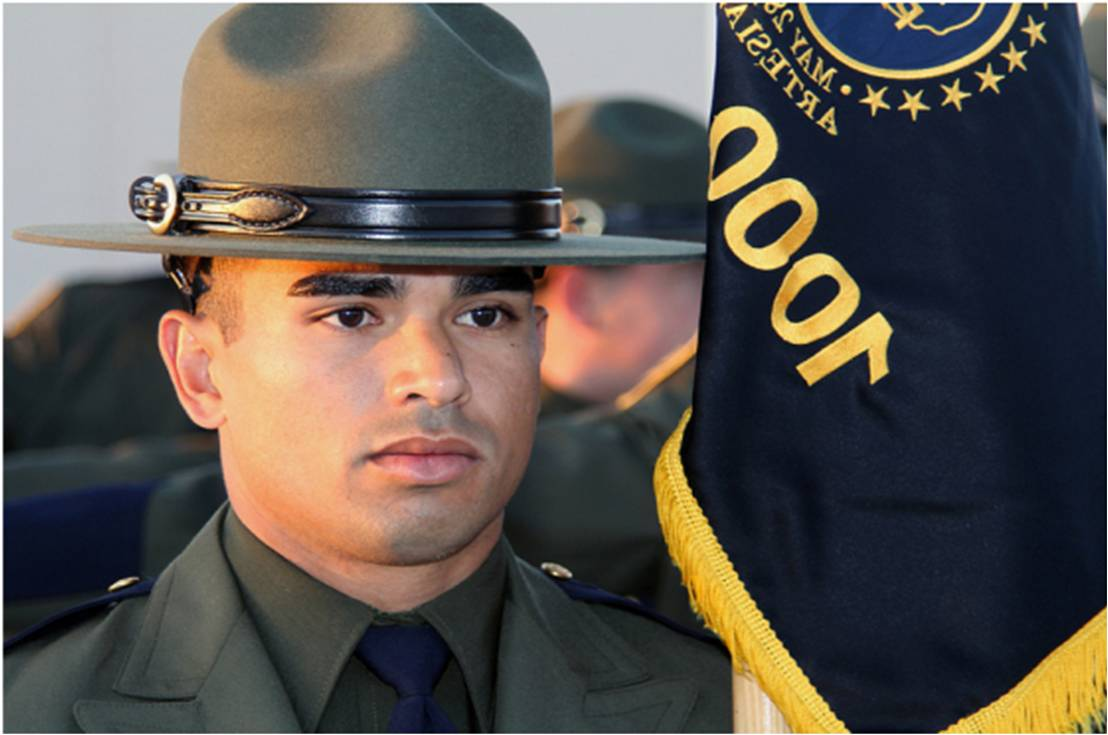
Shown here on a U.S. Border Patrol Agent, the campaign hat is frequently used by sheriff's offices.

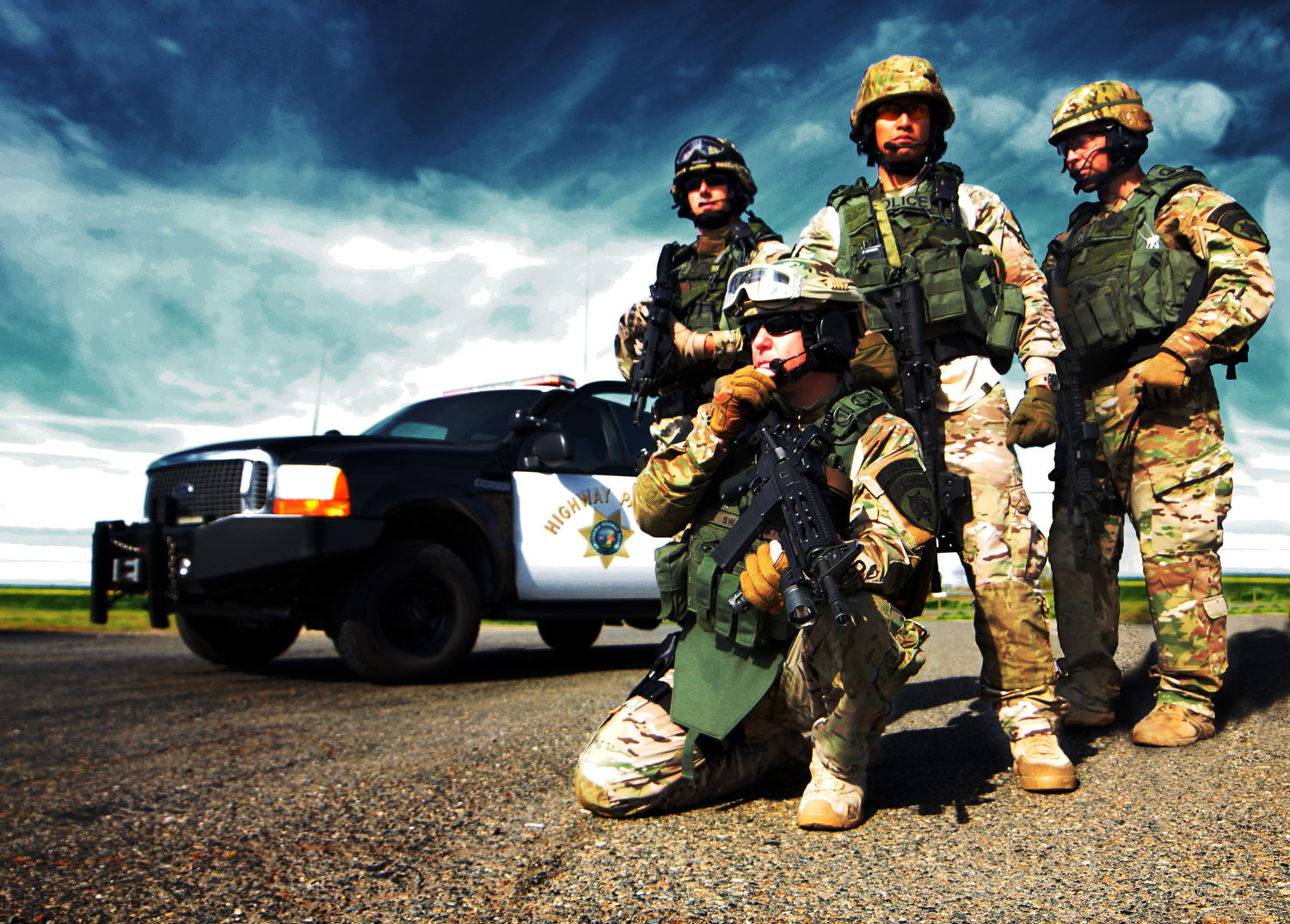
California Highway Patrol SWAT team in tactical uniforms

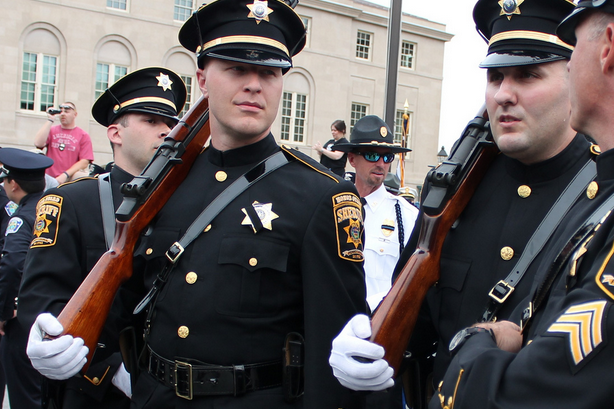
Berks County, Pennsylvania sheriff's deputies in dress uniform

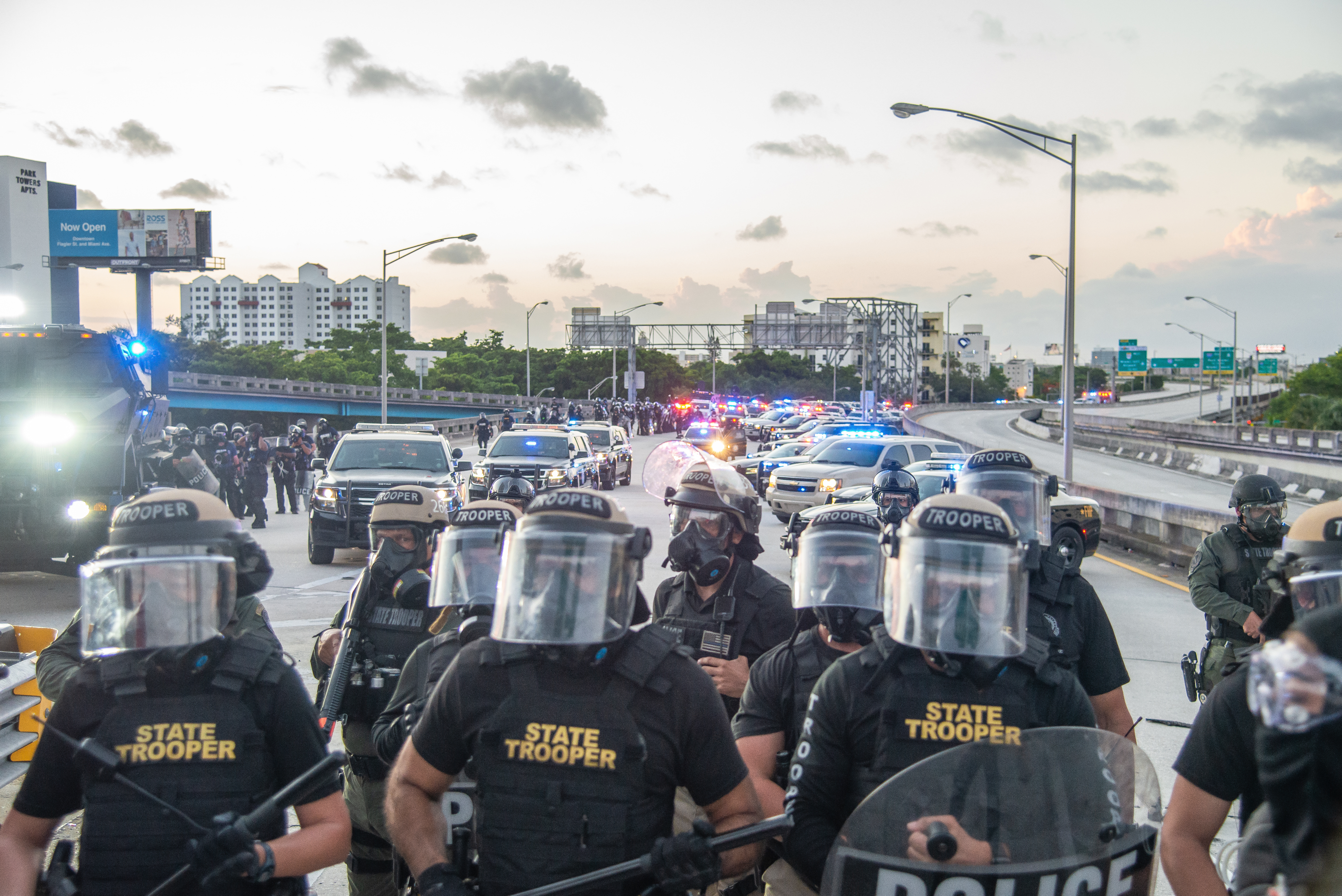
Florida Highway Patrol in riot control gear
Historical Uniforms
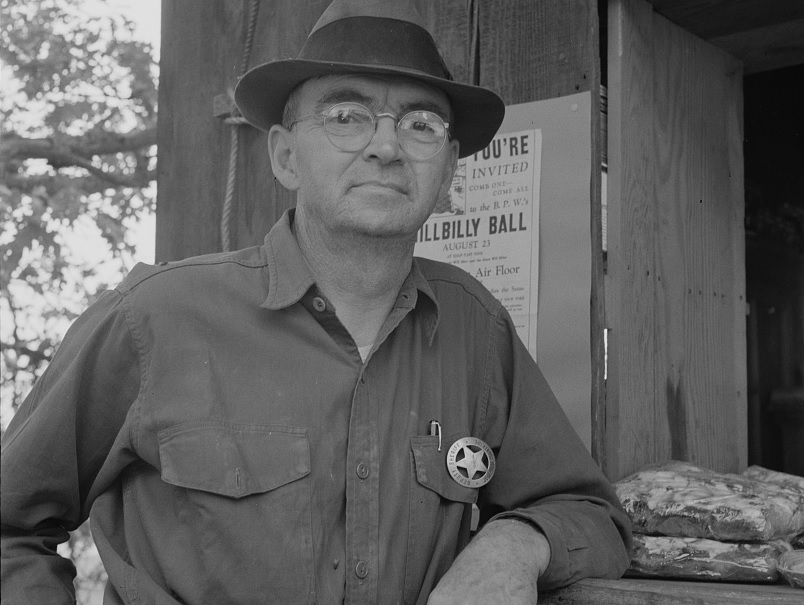
A Josephine County, Oregon deputy sheriff pictured in 1939 wearing civilian clothes. Particularly in rural areas, sheriff's offices were slow to adopt uniforms.

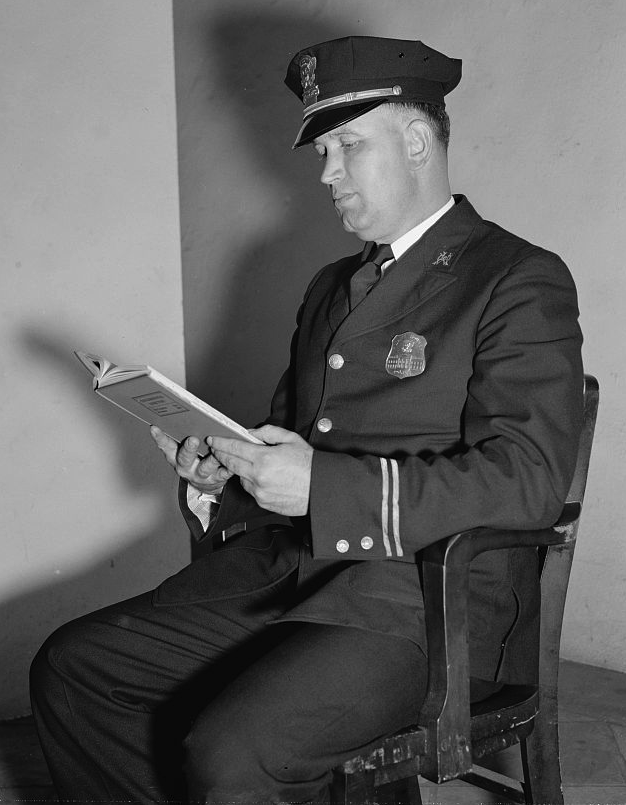
A White House Police officer (now the Secret Service Uniformed Division) in 1938

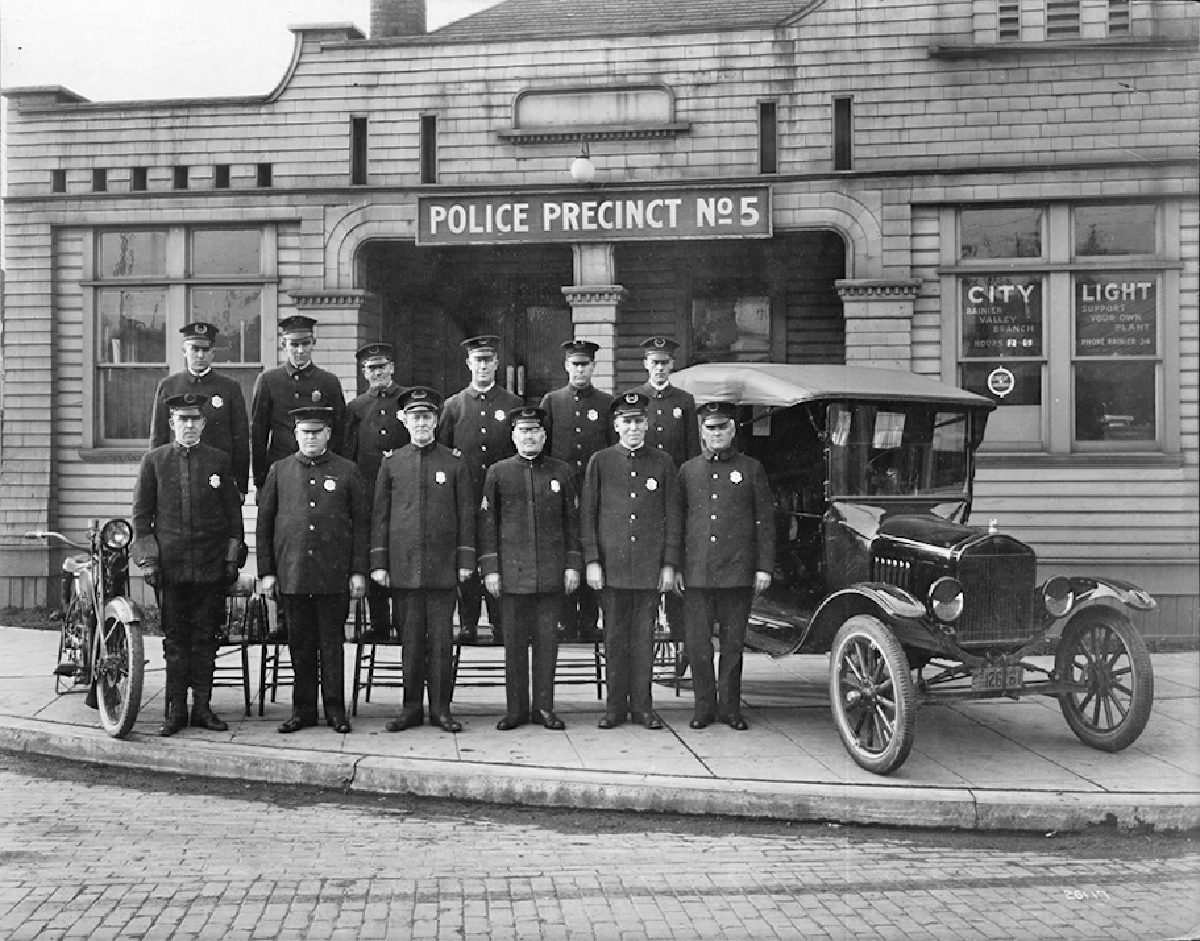
Seattle, Washington police in 1921

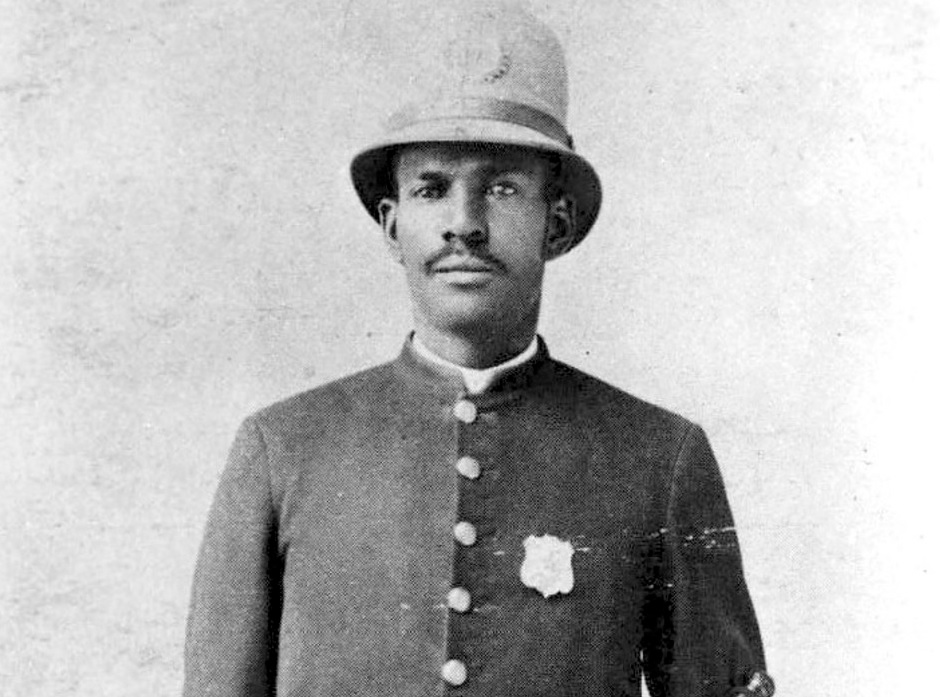
A Salt Lake City, Utah police officer wearing custodian helmet in 1874

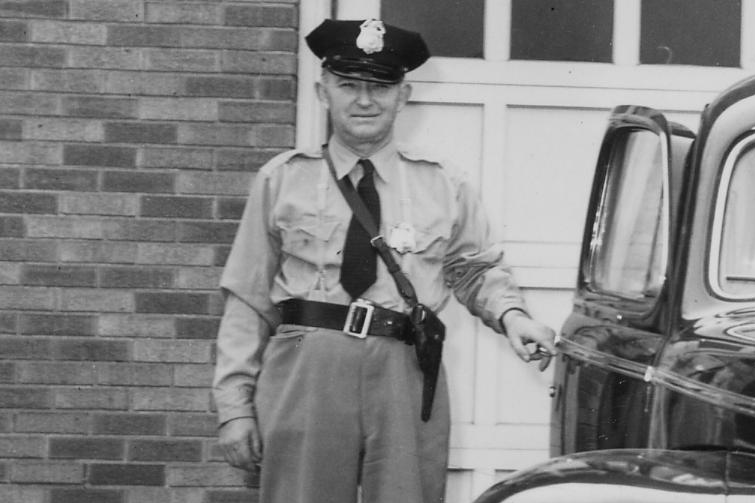
Ritzville, Washington police officer in 1950

Municipal police officer in an unknown U.S. city, circa 1924

== See also ==
- Law enforcement in the United States
- Police uniforms and equipment in the United Kingdom
