= Brunswick star =

Heraldic emblem

The Metropolitan Police flag

The Brunswick star is an emblem which in outline is an eight-pointed or sixteen-pointed star, but which is composed of many narrow rays. It is used in the United Kingdom to surround the royal cypher on various badges, such as that worn on the caps and helmets of almost all police and fire services in England and Wales.

The name Brunswick refers to the German Duchy of Brunswick-Lüneburg, better known as the Principality of Hanover, which was ruled by the House of Hanover whose heads also became Kings of Great Britain and Ireland.

The first Brunswick star as heraldic emblem was probably that of the Order of Saint Patrick, installed by King George III. Supposedly the shape is based on the representation of the clearest star of the Southern Hemisphere, Achernar in the constellation of Eridanus, as depicted in the Uranometria.

== Users ==
- Alberta Sheriffs Branch
- Coldstream Guards
- Estonian Rescue Board and Häirekeskus
- Federal Police of Germany and various State Police Forces
- Guyana Defence Force
- Irish Guards
- Jamaica Defence Force
- Lithuanian Police Force
- National Police of Ukraine and the Ministry of Internal Affairs of Ukraine
- National Police Corps of Spain
- Netherlands Marine Corps
- Polish Police
- Royal Dragoon Guards
- The Royal Regiment of Canada
- University of London Officer Training Corps
- The London Guards
- Scots Guards
- South African Police Service (formerly South African Police)
- South Australian Country Fire Service
- Zimbabwe Republic Police
- Kolkata Police Force

=== Former ===
- Customs and Excise Department (Hong Kong) – before 1997
- The Dutch police both municipal and state police – until 01 April 1993
- Kulangsu Municipal Police – until 1943
- Shanghai Volunteer Corps and Municipal Police – until 1942
- Volkspolizei – until 1990
