= Use-of-force law in Missouri =

Use-of-force law in Missouri refers to the law & legal doctrine which determine whether a member of law enforcement in the state of Missouri is justified in the amount of force used to gain control of an unruly situation or person, including situations involving death. In the United States, doctrine about use of force is primarily defined by the individual states, although there have been some Supreme Court decisions of limited scope.

Missouri's legal experts have said the use of force laws in Missouri are considered more officer-friendly than that in other states. Such laws have come under national scrutiny in the wake of the shooting of Michael Brown in 2014.

Current law governing use of force is specified in Missouri Revised Statutes chapter 563, which differ substantially from the laws of neighboring states.

== Background ==
=== Use of force ===
In the course of their duties, law enforcement personnel use force to subdue suspects. The use of force consists of two parts: the amount of force that may lawfully be used on a continuum that includes deadly force; and the circumstances under which it may be used, including the level of imminent threat reasonably perceived by the member of law enforcement and the concern that a fleeing felon may harm the public. Doctrines are intended to balance security needs with ethical concerns for the rights and well-being of intruders or suspects. In the event that members of the public are injured, this may give rise to issues of self-defense as a justification. In the event of death during a reasonable use of force, this may be legally considered a justifiable homicide. The application of excessive force is considered Police brutality.

=== Use of force national guidelines ===
State police in the United States are generally given considerable leeway in making the decision about the amount of force needed to save themselves or others. While there is no national definition, the United States Supreme Court has created legal standards for use of force through two key decisions. "Objective reasonableness" is a concept from the 1985 Tennessee v. Garner decision that stated that police officers could not shoot at a fleeing suspect simply to prevent their escape but only if the suspect posed a significant threat of death or serious harm to the community. In the 1989 decision of Graham v. Connor, the court ruled that "the reasonableness of a particular use of force must be judged from the perspective of a reasonable officer on the scene, and its calculus must embody an allowance for the fact that police officers are often forced to make split-second decisions about the amount of force necessary in a particular situation." Current local and state doctrines vary in defining these decisions and are tested in civil lawsuits and criminal prosecutions on a case-by-case basis. If a case where the use of force has been applied unevenly based on a suspect's race, sex, disability, religion, or national origin, the Civil Rights Division of the United States Department of Justice is empowered to bring charges for breaking Federal law governing civil rights. When the Department of Justice investigates a pattern of use of force abuses, it can work with a state or agency to create new policies that align with national law and precedent.

== Missouri doctrine ==
Law enforcement agencies in Missouri exist at the town, county, and state levels and are subject to national guidelines, state laws, and applicable local or county policies. Use of force doctrine is defined in Missouri by state law as well as local policy. From the 1860s, when Missouri became a state, until the 1960s, individual states wrote their own codes, often using common law as a basis. In 1962, the Model Penal Code was published with recommendations to modernize and standardize penal law and criminal law nationally. The code served and continues to serve as a basis for the replacement of existing criminal codes in over two-thirds of the states. Missouri did not incorporate the recommendations. The statutes concerning use of force in Missouri included the stipulation that police officers could use deadly force to stop a fleeing suspect of a felony including the event that the felony was not of a violent nature, such as a crime against property. In 1977, the United States Court of Appeals for the Eighth Circuit struck down these statutes in Mattis v. R Schnarr. The court found that the Missouri statute authorizing the use of deadly force by police attempting to arrest any fleeing felon was unconstitutional as "an arbitrary imposition of death" and violation of due process.

In Tennessee v. Garner, Justice Byron White wrote for the Majority opinion addressing the legal issue as whether the totality of the circumstances justified the deadly force. Because it deprives the suspect of his life, White concluded that deadly force should be applied only when there is a "reasonable suspicion" that a suspect is armed or dangerous. The legal concept derives from a prior decision in Terry v. Ohio (1968) where court recognized law enforcement's right to stop a possible suspect for a brief time and take additional steps to investigate further. In 1989, Graham v. Connor, a similar finding was held; ""the reasonableness of a particular use of force must be judged from the perspective of a reasonable officer on the scene, and its calculus must embody an allowance for the fact that police officers are often forced to make split-second decisions about the amount of force necessary in a particular situation." Although Missouri statute still stated that law enforcement could use force including deadly force on any suspect that "has attempted to commit or has committed a felony," the concept of reasonableness was included. "...An officer may only use deadly force as permitted by other justifications such a self defense or when he reasonably believes that such use of deadly force is immediately necessary to effect the arrest and also reasonably believes that the person to be arrested a)Has committed or attempted to commit a felony; or b) Is attempting to escape by use of a deadly weapon; or c) May otherwise endanger life or inflict serious physical injury unless arrested without delay."

Investigation into possible use of force violation is first conducted internally. A state prosecutor can also apply to judge or grand jury to decide whether there is enough evidence to pursue a prosecution. The application of the standard is interpreted by a jury in criminal cases.

== See also ==
- Police accountability
