= Plumhoff v. Rickard =

- Supreme Court of the United States

Argued March 4, 2014 Decided May 27, 2014
- Full case name: Officer Vance Plumhoff, et al., petitioners v. Whitne Rickard, a minor child, individually, and as surviving daughter of Donald Rickard, deceased, by and through her mother, Samantha Rickard, as parent and next friend
- Docket no.: 12-1117
- Citations: 572 U.S. 765 (more) 134 S. Ct. 2012; 188 L. Ed. 2d 1056
- Argument: Oral argument
- Opinion announcement: Opinion announcement

Case history
- Prior: Motion for summary judgment denied, Nos. 05-2489/2585, 2011 WL 197426 (W.D. Tenn. Jan. 20, 2011); affirmed, 509 Fed. Appx. 388 (6th Cir. 2012).; cert. granted, 571 U. S. 1020 (2013).

Holding
- (1) The Sixth Circuit properly exercised jurisdiction under 28 U. S. C. §1291. (2) The officers' conduct did not violate the Fourth Amendment. (3) Even if the officers' conduct had violated the Fourth Amendment, petitioners would still be entitled to summary judgment based on qualified immunity.

Court membership
- Chief Justice John Roberts Associate Justices Antonin Scalia · Anthony Kennedy; Clarence Thomas · Ruth Bader Ginsburg; Stephen Breyer · Samuel Alito; Sonia Sotomayor · Elena Kagan

Case opinion
- Majority: Alito, joined by Roberts, Scalia, Kennedy, Thomas, Sotomayor, Kagan; Ginsburg (judgment and Parts I, II, and III–C); Breyer (except Part III–B–2) (Note: The Court's decision was unanimous (9–0) except that Justice Ruth Bader Ginsburg did not join parts III–A and III–B, and Justice Stephen Breyer did not join part III–B–2. The Supreme Court's opinion is divided as follows.: Part I describes the facts of the case and the lower court proceedings.; In Part II, the Court holds that it has jurisdiction to hear this case.; In Part III–A, the Court explains why it was beginning its legal analysis with whether a constitutional right was actually violated.; In Part III–B–1, the Court holds that the police did not violate the Fourth Amendment by using deadly force to end the high-speed car chase.; In Part III–B–2, the Court rejects the argument that number of shots fired in this case was unreasonable, even if it was reasonable to use deadly force.; In Part III–C, the Court holds that even if the officers' conduct did violate the Fourth Amendment, they "would still be entitled to summary judgment based on qualified immunity".)

Laws applied
- U.S. Const. amend. IV

Plumhoff v. Rickard, 572 U.S. 765 (2014), is a United States Supreme Court case involving the use of force by police officers during high-speed car chases. After first holding that it had jurisdiction to hear the case, the Court held that the conduct of the police officers involved in the case did not violate the Fourth Amendment to the U.S. Constitution, which prohibits unreasonable searches and seizures.

Near midnight on July 18, 2004, Donald Rickard led police officers on a high-speed car chase ending in a parking lot, where officers fired fifteen shots into Rickard's car as he continued to flee. Rickard and his passenger both died from a combination of gunshot wounds and injuries sustained when the car eventually crashed. Rickard's daughter sued the officers who shot Rickard, arguing that they had used excessive force in violation of the Fourth Amendment. The officers moved for summary judgment, arguing they were entitled to qualified immunity because their actions did not violate law that was clearly established at the time of the car chase. The district court denied this motion, and the court of appeals affirmed.

On May 27, 2014, the Supreme Court reversed, holding that the officers did not violate the Fourth Amendment. In a unanimous (9–0) decision authored by Justice Samuel Alito, the Court found that Rickard's actions posed a "grave public safety risk" and that the officers "acted reasonably in using deadly force to end that risk". The Court also found that the number of shots fired was also reasonable, writing that "if police officers are justified in firing at a suspect in order to end a severe threat to public safety, the officers need not stop shooting until the threat has ended". Finally, the Court said the officers would have still been entitled to summary judgment based on qualified immunity, even if their conduct did violate the Fourth Amendment, because their actions did not violate clearly established law at the time of the incident.

== Background ==
=== Prior case law ===
The Fourth Amendment to the United States Constitution prohibits unreasonable searches and seizures by the federal government, and the Fourteenth Amendment extends this prohibition to state governments under the incorporation doctrine. In the course of their duties, police officers must sometimes make split-second decisions in situations where they believe there is a serious threat to the lives of themselves or the public. The use of force by police officers to counter such threats constitutes a Fourth Amendment seizure. The Supreme Court has previously held in such cases as Tennessee v. Garner (1985) and Graham v. Connor (1989) that the use of force, including deadly force, by a police officer does not violate the Fourth Amendment if it is "objectively reasonable" in light of the circumstances confronting them.

Prior to Plumhoff the Supreme Court had also examined the use of force against fleeing motorists specifically. In Brosseau v. Haugen (2004), the Supreme Court upheld the use of force by a police officer who fired her gun into the back of a suspect's car after chasing the suspect on foot. The Court held in Scott v. Harris (2007) that a "police officer's attempt to terminate a dangerous high-speed car chase that threatens the lives of innocent bystanders does not violate the Fourth Amendment, even when it places the fleeing motorist at risk of serious injury or death." In both cases, the Court confirmed that the standard of review for force against fleeing motorists is the same "objective reasonableness" standard as that in Graham v. Connor.

If a person believes that the use of force against them is unjustified, 42 U.S.C. §1983 allows them to file a civil action, claiming a violation of their constitutional rights. In general, police officers are protected from individual liability from these claims by the qualified immunity doctrine, which prevents government officials, including police officers, from being held individually liable for federal civil rights violations unless their conduct violated clearly established law at the time in question. In Johnson v. Jones (1995), the Supreme Court held that a defendant entitled to qualified immunity in these kinds of cases cannot immediately appeal a district court's order regarding a motion for summary judgment "insofar as that order determines whether or not the pretrial record sets forth a genuine issue of fact for trial".

=== Facts of the case ===
Around midnight on July 18, 2004, Lieutenant Joseph Forthman of the West Memphis, Arkansas, Police Department pulled over a white Honda Accord driven by Donald Rickard because the car had only one working headlight. A woman named Kelly Allen sat in the car's passenger seat. During the traffic stop, the lieutenant noticed an indentation in the car's windshield that, according to him, was "'roughly the size of a head or basketball'". He then saw beer in the car and asked whether Rickard had been drinking, which Rickard denied. Rickard appeared nervous and failed to produce a driver's license when asked; the lieutenant asked him to step out of the car, but Rickard sped away.

The lieutenant, later joined by other officers, pursued Rickard in a high-speed car chase down Interstate 40 that reached speeds beyond 100 miles (160 km) per hour. The chase lasted approximately five minutes. According to a video of the car chase, Rickard nearly struck 29 other drivers, struck two different patrol cars, and nearly struck another patrol car. Rickard drove east, crossing the Mississippi River into Tennessee. The officers attempted unsuccessfully to use a "rolling roadblock" to stop Rickard. After exiting Interstate 40, Rickard collided with the cruiser of one of the officers and spun out into a parking lot in Memphis, Tennessee.

Rickard temporarily stopped next to a building, and officers approached his car on foot. Rickard then began to back up, and an officer pounded against his passenger-side window with his firearm. Rickard subsequently collided with another police cruiser, and even though Rickard's bumper was flush against the cruiser, he continued to use his accelerator. At this point, Sergeant Vance Plumhoff fired three shots into Rickard's car. Then, as Rickard continued "fleeing down" a street, officers Troy Galtelli and John Gardner fired twelve additional shots in the direction of Rickard's car, making the total number of shots fired in the incident fifteen. Rickard then lost control and crashed into a building. He and Allen died from a combination of gunshot wounds and crash injuries.

=== Lower court proceedings ===
Whitne Rickard, Rickard's minor daughter, filed a legal action under 42 U.S.C. § 1983 against Plumhoff and the other officers, alleging that the officers had violated the Fourth and Fourteenth Amendments by using excessive force against her father. (Note: The plaintiffs of the lawsuit also originally included the estate of Kelly Allen, the passenger in Rickard's car. The defendants also included the mayor and the chief of police. The district court dismissed the claims against the mayor and the police chief, as well as the Fourth Amendment excessive force claims of the estate of Allen. Allen's estate appealed this dismissal, but a panel of the Sixth Circuit dismissed the appeal sua sponte.) The officers filed a motion for summary judgment on the basis of qualified immunity. The U.S. District Court for the Western District of Tennessee denied this motion on January 20, 2011, holding that the officers' conduct violated clearly established law at the time of the incident. Before the case could proceed, the officers appealed the district court's denial to the U.S. Court of Appeals for the Sixth Circuit, which initially dismissed the appeal for lack of jurisdiction, citing the Supreme Court's decision in Johnson v. Jones, but later vacated that judgment and instead affirmed the District Court's holding on October 9, 2012.

== Supreme Court ==
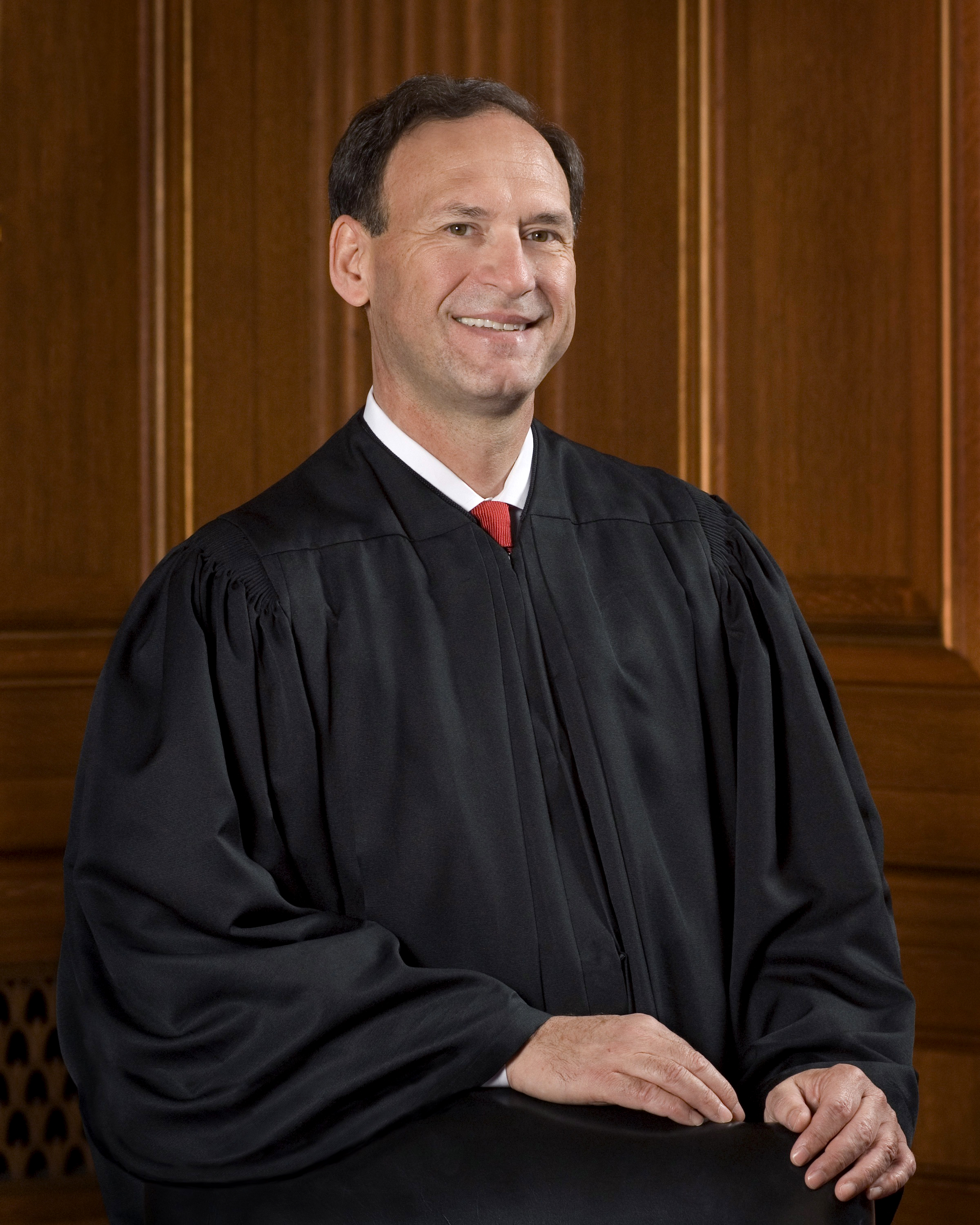
Justice Samuel Alito wrote the unanimous opinion of the U.S. Supreme Court in Plumhoff v. Rickard

The officers filed a petition for a writ of certiorari with the Supreme Court. The petition was distributed for conference six times before the Court granted certiorari on November 15, 2013. Two questions were presented in the petition: (1) "whether the Sixth Circuit wrongly denied qualified immunity to Petitioners by analyzing whether the force used in 2004 was distinguishable from factually similar force ruled permissible three years later in Scott v. Harris [...]", and (2) "whether the Sixth Circuit erred in denying qualified immunity by finding the use of force was not reasonable as a matter of law when, under Respondent's own facts, the suspect led police officers on a high-speed pursuit [...]".

=== Opinion of the Court ===
Justice Samuel Alito delivered the opinion of the Court on May 27, 2014. Writing for a unanimous Court, Alito first addressed whether the Court had jurisdiction to hear the case as an interlocutory appeal. (Note: An interlocutory appeal is a type of appeal that occurs in the middle of a proceeding, before the court has reached a final decision in the case. In the case of Plumhoff v. Rickard, the police officers appealed the district court's order denying summary judgment on qualified immunity. Because the officers appealed the case immediately after this order, without waiting for the case to proceed to trial, the appeal is considered "interlocutory".) Alito then wrote that the officers' conduct did not violate the Fourth Amendment. Finally, Alito stated that the officers would still be entitled to qualified immunity even if their actions had violated the Fourth Amendment. The Court reversed the judgment of the Sixth Circuit and remanded the case for further proceedings consistent with its opinion.

==== Jurisdiction ====
In general, federal law (specifically 28 U.S.C. § 1291) only allows courts of appeals to hear appeals from the "final decisions" of district courts, and Alito acknowledged that an order denying summary judgment "is generally not a final decision within the meaning of §1291 and is thus generally not immediately appealable". However, summary judgments based on qualified immunity are an exception to this general rule, since qualified immunity is "an immunity from suit rather than a mere defense to liability". Alito rejected the respondent's argument that the Court's decision in Johnson v. Jones prevents the Court from having jurisdiction in this case, stating that in Johnson, the summary judgment order was not appealable because "it merely decided 'a question of evidence sufficiency', i.e. which facts a party may, or may not, be able to prove at trial". In the case of Plumhoff v. Rickard, however, the officers raised legal issues, and Alito stated that "deciding legal issues of this sort is a core responsibility of appellate courts".

==== Fourth Amendment ====
Moving to his constitutional analysis of the case, Alito explained that he was beginning his analysis of whether the officers violated "clearly established law" by answering whether the officers actually violated the Fourth Amendment, citing the Court's decision in Saucier v. Katz (2001). Alito reaffirmed the Court's decisions in Graham v. Connor and Tennessee v. Garner that excessive force claims against law enforcement officers are evaluated under the "objective reasonableness" standard of the Fourth Amendment, which "requires analyzing the totality of the circumstances". Examining the facts of the case "from the perspective 'of a reasonable officer on the scene, rather than with 20/20 vision of hindsight'", Alito concluded that the officers had acted reasonably and had not violated the Fourth Amendment, stating:

Under the circumstances at the moment when the shots were fired, all that a reasonable police officer could have concluded was that Rickard was intent on resuming his flight and that, if he was allowed to do so, he would once again pose a deadly threat for others on the road.

Alito wrote there was "no basis for reaching a different conclusion" from the Court's decision in Scott v. Harris, stating that "Rickard's outrageously reckless driving posed a grave public safety risk" and that "the police acted reasonably in using deadly force to end that risk".

Furthermore, Alito stated that the degree of force that the officers used when firing 15 shots into Rickard's car was also reasonable, writing that "if police officers are justified in firing at a suspect in order to end a severe threat to public safety, the officers need not stop shooting until the threat has ended". In Rickard's case, Alito stated that "during the 10-second span when all the shots were fired, Rickard never abandoned his attempt to flee" and that the case would be different "if petitioners had initiated a second round of shots after an initial round had clearly incapacitated Rickard and had ended any threat of continued flight, or if Rickard had clearly given himself up". The presence of a passenger in Rickard's car does not affect this analysis because the question in the case is "whether petitioners violated Rickard's Fourth Amendment rights, not Allen's".

==== Qualified immunity ====
Finally, Alito wrote that even if the officers' conduct had violated the Fourth Amendment, they "would still be entitled to summary judgment based on qualified immunity". Alito reiterated that an official is "entitled to qualified immunity unless it is shown that the official violated a statutory or constitutional right that was '"clearly established"' at the time of the challenged conduct". Citing the Court's decision in Ashcroft v. al-Kidd (2011), Alito stated that a defendant in a qualified immunity case is said to have violated a "clearly established right" only when "the right's contours were sufficiently definite that any reasonable official in the defendant's shoes would have understood that he was violating it". In the case of Plumhoff, Alito wrote that the Court's decision in Brosseau v. Haugen, in which the Court found reasonable the conduct of a police officer who fired shots at a fleeing vehicle, "squarely demonstrates that no clearly established law precluded petitioners' conduct at the time in question".

== Analysis and reception ==
=== Legal implications ===
In a legal analysis published in Criminal Justice Review, a peer-reviewed academic journal published by SAGE Publishing, Darrell L. Ross of Valdosta State University discussed the legal and practical implications of Plumhoff. According to Ross, "lower courts are reminded of how to assess issues pertaining to qualified immunity, particularly in use of force cases". Specifically, the "correct standard, as reiterated by the Court—which was never discussed by the Sixth Circuit—is whether the right was sufficiently clear that every reasonable official would have understood what he or she is doing violates that right."

During the course of the Court's review of the case, the justices watched audiovisual recordings of the car chase that led to Rickard's death. In an analysis published in the Fordham Law Review, Denise K. Barry compared Plumhoff to the case Tolan v. Cotton (2014), in which the Supreme Court summarily vacated a motion which granted summary judgment to a police officer on the basis of qualified immunity. In Tolan, no audio-visual evidence was available for the Court to review. In comparing the cases, Barry argued that "the Court decided Tolan and Plumhoff as it did because in Tolan, the evidence was purely testimonial, while in Plumhoff, an audiovisual record was available to the Court". In her analysis, Barry proposed that judges "must undergo further education regarding the near impossibility of experiencing audiovisual evidence objectively", concluding that rather than judges, "more often than not, a jury should view the audiovisual evidence, bringing to this purported objective evidence a variety of viewpoints and perspectives".

=== Effect on law enforcement ===
In his analysis of Plumhoff, Ross also commented that police are reminded of the Court's principles regarding the use of deadly force in accordance with Graham, especially as it pertains to fleeing motorists. Specifically, Ross wrote, "Whether force appears reasonable is measured from the perspective of the officer at the moment the officer decided to use it." Ross also emphasized the implications of the Court's analysis over the number of rounds fired: police officers "are not trained or required to shoot to wound", he wrote, "nor are they trained to shoot warning shots prior to responding with deadly force". According to Ross, "Justice Alito confirmed the fact officers are trained to keep shooting until the threat is stopped". Finally, Ross wrote, "Police administrators are encouraged to review and revise their current use of force and pursuit policies consistent with this decision." Ross recommended that "administrators should provide training to their officers on use of force legal issues and principles that emerge from Rickard, Graham, Scott, and Brosseau".

In an article published in the UC Davis Law Review, Sharon R. Fairley, a lecturer at the University of Chicago Law School, wrote that "law enforcement experts and agencies generally agree that firing at or into moving vehicles is an unsound police tactic", arguing that "the Court should reconsider its opinion [in Plumhoff] that using deadly force is almost always a more effective way to end a vehicle pursuit than merely abandoning the pursuit". In the Michigan Journal of Race & Law, Jonathan M. Smith of the David A. Clarke School of Law wrote, "While the Plumhoff Court emphasized the dangerousness of a high-speed chase, it ignored the fact that the chase would cease as soon as the police stopped chasing the suspect." Given the danger posed by high-speed chases, Smith commented that "the National Institute of Justice issued recommendations in 1990 to limit the use of high-speed chases and to pursue alternatives, including ceasing the pursuit and tracking down the car at a later time through its license plate number".

In an article published in the Alabama Civil Rights & Civil Liberties Law Review, John P. Gross, an assistant professor at the University of Alabama School of Law, discussed Plumhoff in the context of multiple cases related to qualified immunity and commented that they "give little guidance to law enforcement agencies attempting to develop use of force policies". Gross compared Plumhoff to the 2015 case Mullenix v. Luna, describing both as "especially problematic" because both "approved of shooting into a car in an effort to stop a fleeing suspect despite the fact that the vast majority of law enforcement agencies instruct officers to never fire into a moving car".

=== Reactions and criticism ===
Erwin Chemerinsky, the dean of the University of California, Irvine School of Law, wrote an opinion piece published in The New York Times, in which he described the Court's decision as "deeply disturbing", arguing that there are alternatives to shooting at fleeing vehicles, such as "shooting out the car’s tires" or "taking the license plate number and tracking the driver down later". In the article, Chemerinsky also opposed the doctrine of qualified immunity, arguing that it poses an unreasonable burden for individuals alleging violations of constitutional rights. In a blog post published in The Hill, Jonathan R. Nash, a professor of law at Emory University School of Law, argued that the Court's decision in Plumhoff was inconsistent with the precedent it set in Scott, commenting that the Court "jettisoned Scott's careful balancing in favor of an approach designed to give the police substantial leeway in terminating chases". Nash stated there were differences between the facts in Plumhoff versus the facts in Scott, which he felt should have compelled the Court to a different conclusion. For example, in Scott, the police used a maneuver that caused the driver to spin out of control, whereas in Plumhoff, the police used their firearms. Additionally, in Scott, the driver was the only one in the fleeing car, whereas in Plumhoff, Rickard had a passenger.

In a post published in the blog Crimes and Consequences, Kent Scheidegger commented that in light of Scott, "it is clear enough that there was no Fourth Amendment violation on the straight merits of the case, and it is virtually beyond dispute that the officers were entitled to qualified immunity". On that basis, Scheidegger speculated that the reason Plumhoff was distributed for conference numerous times was because the Court was considering reversing the Sixth Circuit as a summary disposition.
