= Warning shot =

Intentionally harmless artillery shot with intent to enact direct compliance

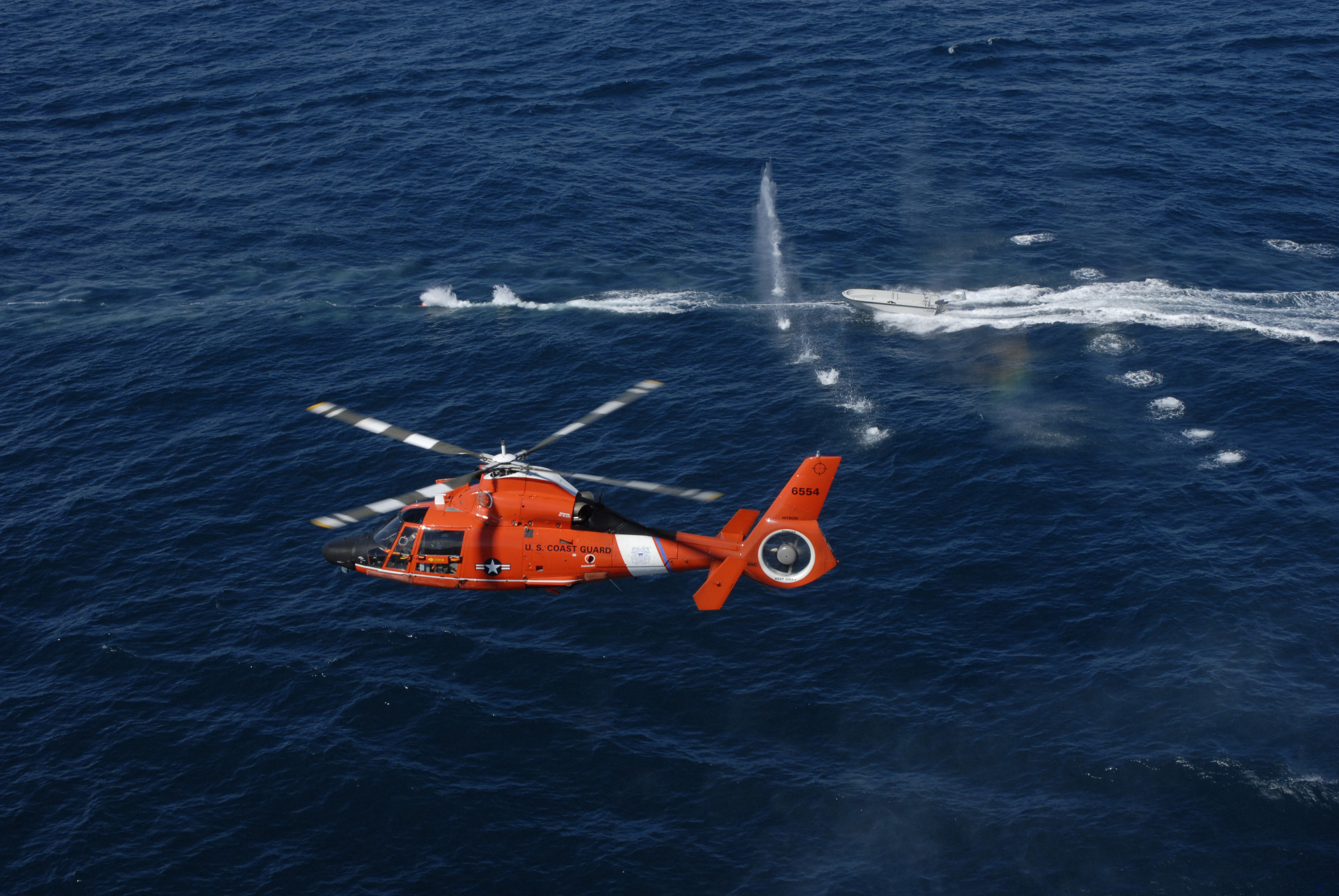
A Helicopter Interdiction Tactical Squadron (USCG) MH-65C Dolphin firing warning shots at a non-compliant boat during training.

In military and police contexts, a warning shot is an intentionally harmless artillery shot or gunshot with intent to enact direct compliance and order from a hostile perpetrator or enemy force. It is recognized as signaling intended confrontations on land, sea, and air.

As an analogy, a "warning shot" can be used to describe any action of declaration, especially a demonstration of power, intended or perceived as a last warning before hostile measures.

== Uses ==
=== Navy ===
During the 18th century, a warning shot (in nautical terms, often called a shot across the bow) could be fired towards any ship whose "colours" (nationality) had to be ascertained. According to the law of the sea, a ship thus hailed had to fly her flag and confirm it with a gunshot. Warning shots may still be used in modern times to signal a vessel to stop or keep off and may be fired from other ships, boats, or aircraft.

On October 27, 1962, during the Cuban Missile Crisis, American forces dropped practice depth charges on the Soviet submarine B-59 as a form of signaling. The captain and political officer of the B-59 opted to respond with a nuclear torpedo, but the third man required to authorize a nuclear attack, executive officer and flotilla Commodore Vasily Arkhipov, refused.

=== Air force ===
Warning shots are also used in military aviation, to demand some action of an unresponsive and presumed hostile aircraft; the most common demand would be for the aircraft to change course. The ostensible justification for firing shots is that tracer rounds are very bright and would immediately gain the attention of a crew whose radio is non-functioning, or who might not have noticed radio transmissions. The objective of warning shots is to demonstrate the ability to shoot, and threaten the crew of the unresponsive aircraft that they will be shot down if they do not comply.

=== Army ===
Warning shots may also be used by ground forces, to disperse crowds or to warn perceived threats to withdraw. Certain militaries mandate warning shots in attempt to de-escalate situations. For example, according to the Israel Defense Forces' rules of engagement, soldiers under threat of death are required to fire two warning shots into the air prior to resorting to firing their weapons to non-lethal areas.

=== Law enforcement ===
Police officers may use warning shots from their sidearm in specific circumstances to de-escalate dangerous situations. Such a shot is typically only used late in the use of force continuum and analogous to the appliance of outright lethal force, as firing warning shots bring certain inherent risks. A key consideration for the officer to make before firing a warning shot is that a shot fired horizontal or at the ground may ricochet off hard surfaces in unpredictable ways, whilst a shot in the air may travel far away and strike in an unpredictable place; both may cause danger to property and bystanders. In addition to these risks, a warning shot may have an escalating effect rather than a de-escalating one: if the target perceives the shot not as a warning but a deliberate but failed attempt on their life, they may return with force. Other officers in the area may too perceive the warning shot as a deliberate shot and act in response. Verbally communicating the officer's intent to the target and other officers mitigates the risk of escalation.

Whether warning shots should be used by law enforcement agencies is a point of debate. Proponents argue that the warning shots can prevent deaths and injuries in police shootings by allowing a final intermediate step and last chance at de-escalation before the application of deadly force in the use of force continuum. Research has shown that situations where warning shots were used had a largely de-escalating effect. Terry Cunningham of the International Association of Chiefs of Police commented that warning shots give officers more options in the case of a threat, commenting, "We're kind of entering into this new environment in use of force where everybody is trying to learn how to better de-escalate". Opponents of warning shots point towards the inherent risks to uninvolved persons, as well as argue that the possibility of firing warning shots complicates the decision making process for police officers of whether to use deadly force. According to this view, situations that call for warning shots already warrant the immediate use of lethal force.

Various agencies, such as the Las Vegas Metropolitan Police Department and National Police of Paraguay, specifically forbid the use of lethal firearms to fire warning shots. Other agencies such as the Lower Saxony State Police and Dutch National Police allow the use of warning shots in a cautious manner that does not endanger persons.

== See also ==
- Roof knocking
- Show of force
- Shooting to wound
- Use of force
