= Scott v. Harris =

- Supreme Court of the United States

Argued February 26, 2007 Decided April 30, 2007
- Full case name: Timothy Scott v. Victor Harris
- Docket no.: 05-1631
- Citations: 550 U.S. 372 (more) 127 S. Ct. 1769; 167 L. Ed. 2d 686

Case history
- Prior: Summary judgment for defendant denied, sub nom., Harris v. Coweta County, No. 01–148, N.D. Ga., Sept. 23, 2003; aff'd, 433 F.3d 807 (11th Cir. 2005); cert. granted, 549 U.S. ___ (2006)

Holding
- Because the car chase respondent initiated posed a substantial and immediate risk of serious physical injury to others, Scott's attempt to terminate the chase by forcing respondent off the road was reasonable, and Scott is entitled to summary judgment.

Court membership
- Chief Justice John Roberts Associate Justices John P. Stevens · Antonin Scalia; Anthony Kennedy · David Souter; Clarence Thomas · Ruth Bader Ginsburg; Stephen Breyer · Samuel Alito

Case opinions
- Majority: Scalia, joined by Roberts, Kennedy, Souter, Thomas, Ginsburg, Breyer, Alito
- Concurrence: Ginsburg
- Concurrence: Breyer
- Dissent: Stevens

Laws applied
- U.S. Const. amend. IV; 42 U.S.C. § 1983

Scott v. Harris, 550 U.S. 372 (2007), was a decision by the Supreme Court of the United States involving a lawsuit against a sheriff's deputy brought by a motorist who was paralyzed after the officer ran his eluding vehicle off the road during a high-speed car chase.

Scott v. Harris examined a claim of qualified immunity in relation to an excessive force claim. To decide whether Officer Scott was entitled to qualified immunity under Saucier v. Katz the Court first had to decide whether Harris' constitutional rights were violated. The Supreme Court decided the case in Scott's favor because videotape showed that Harris had endangered public safety when he fled from police, and Scott's actions were therefore objectively reasonable under the Court's excessive force precedents.

== Background ==
During high-speed chase, initiated by the Coweta County Sherriff's Department after Victor Harris ignored a signal to stop and sped away, Officer Timothy Scott forced Harris's car off the road. Scott was authorized to use the PIT maneuver to stop the chase. This maneuver had less of a risk of a crash than directly running the car off the road but Scott did not think he could pull off the maneuver at the high-speeds and he decided to hit the car directly. The crash left Harris a quadriplegic. Harris filed a Section 1983 excessive force claim. The district court and Eleventh Circuit said Scott's actions could constitute deadly force, and denied summary judgment for Scott's qualified immunity claim.

The case also involved the question of whether a police officer's qualified immunity shielded him from suit under Section 1983. On April 30, 2007, in an 8–1 decision, the court sided with police and ruled that a "police officer's attempt to terminate a dangerous high-speed car chase that threatens the lives of innocent bystanders does not violate the Fourth Amendment, even when it places the fleeing motorist at risk of serious injury or death." In a rare occurrence, the court accepted the presentation of video evidence of the high-speed pursuit. Such procedure is quite uncommon in the Supreme Court and was viewed as part of an interesting relationship between the Supreme Court and technology. The video had a strong effect on the Court's decision and is viewed as a major factor in how the court made its decision.

=== Prior cases ===
The Supreme Court decision Saucier v. Katz established a threshold question for qualified immunity claims. To claim qualified immunity it must first be shown that an officer's actions did not violate a constitutional right. If a court finds a violation, they must also decide if that right was "clearly established".

=== Supreme Court ===
==== Oral argument ====
The Justices were skeptical that Harris' conduct had not created a danger to the public. Justice Scalia said Harris "created the scariest chase I ever saw since 'The French Connection'". Liberal Justice Stephen Breyer agreed with the conservatives that the videotape showed a driver creating a tremendous risk by driving into oncoming traffic.

==== Decision ====
The author of the opinion, Justice Antonin Scalia, in a first-time occurrence ever, posted the video of the car chase online (for access to the video, see external links below). Facts at the summary judgment stage must be viewed in the light most favorable to the non-moving party (in this case, Harris) only if there is a "genuine" dispute about facts. After seeing the videotape, most of the justices agreed that "no reasonable jury could believe" Harris' version of the facts: "The Court of Appeals should not have relied on such visible fiction; it should have viewed the facts in the light depicted by the videotape."

The Court declines to engage Harris' argument about whether, under Tennessee v. Garner, the use of deadly force is constitutional only if "necessary to prevent escape" of an inherently dangerous person who is known to have committed a violent crime. The Court says that Harris' fleeing police in a speeding automobile created an "extreme danger to human life", even though the underlying traffic offense was minor. Scott's actions were reasonable, so there was no violation of constitutionally protected rights. Justice Stephen Breyer concurred, adding some additional comments about the sequential order of Saucier's two-step test.

Justice Ruth Bader Ginsburg concurred but emphasized the fact-dependent nature of excessive force claims required flexible, factor-based analysis on a case-by-case basis.

Justice John Paul Stevens, the lone dissenter, argued that the videotape evidence was not decisive, as the majority claimed it to be, and that a jury should determine if deadly force was justified. He stated a jury should be used, instead of the case "being decided by a group of elderly appellate judges," a reference to himself and his colleagues on the court (this sentence is not in the text of the dissent, but he pronounced it while reading the opinion at bench).

== Reaction ==
Three law professors created an experiment based on the video, showing it to over a thousand subjects and then asking them whether they thought the use of deadly force was reasonable. The study found "[a] fairly substantial majority did interpret the facts the way the Court did. But members of various subcommunities did not." The study and the disagreement over the reasonableness of the use of deadly force was reported in the Harvard Law Review.

Before Scott was decided many scholars believed dangerous maneuvers like the PIT maneuver and car ramming for minor traffic offenses would be unreasonable under the Tennessee v. Garner use of force analysis.

== See also ==
- Tennessee v. Garner, 471 U.S. 1 (1985)
- Plumhoff v. Rickard, 572 U.S. 765 (2014)
