= Police use of deadly force in the United States =

Aspect of law enforcement in the United States

In the United States, use of deadly force by police has been a high-profile and contentious issue. In 2022, 1,096 people were killed by police shootings according to The Washington Post, while according to the "Mapping Police Violence" (MPV) project, 1,176 people were killed by police in total. MPV documented 1,213 killings by police for 2023.

A lack of reliable data has made conclusions about race and policing difficult. Several non-government and crowdsourcing projects have been started to address this lack of reliable data. Research has provided mixed results on the extent of racial bias in the police use of deadly force, with some studies finding no racial bias, while other studies conclude there is racial bias in the use of deadly force.

A study by Esposito, Lee, Edwards estimated that 1 in 2,000 men and 1 in 33,000 women have a lifetime risk of dying as a result of police use of deadly force, with the highest risk for black men, at approximately 1 in 1,000. Black, Hispanic, and Native American/Alaskan individuals are disproportionately killed in police shootings compared to White or Asian individuals.

== Databases ==
Although Congress instructed the Attorney General in 1994 to compile and publish annual statistics on police use of excessive force, this was never carried out, and the Federal Bureau of Investigation does not collect these data. Consequently, no official national database exists to track such killings. This has led multiple non-governmental entities to attempt to create comprehensive databases of police shootings in the United States. The National Violent Death Reporting System is a more complete database to track police homicides than either the FBI's Supplementary Homicide Reports (SHR) or the Centers for Disease Control's National Vital Statistics System (NVSS). This is because both the SHR and NVSS under-report the number of police killings.

=== Government data collection ===
Through the Violent Crime Control and Law Enforcement Act of 1994, specifically Section 210402, the U.S. Congress mandated that the attorney general collect data on the use of excessive force by police and publish an annual report from the data. However, the bill lacked provisions for enforcement. In part due to the lack of participation from state and local agencies, the Bureau of Justice Statistics stopped keeping count in March 2014.

Two national systems collect data that include homicides committed by law enforcement officers in the line of duty.The NVSS aggregates data from locally filed death certificates. State laws require that death certificates be filed with local registrars, but the certificates do not systematically document whether a killing was legally justified nor whether a law enforcement officer was involved. The FBI maintains the Uniform Crime Reporting Program (UCR), which relies on state and local law enforcement agencies voluntarily submitting a SHR. A study of the years 1976 to 1998 found that both national systems under-report justifiable homicides by police officers; the NVSS does not always record police involvement, while the SHR's data collection is incomplete because reports are not always complete or submitted. In addition, from 2007 to 2012, more than 550 homicides by the country's 105 largest law enforcement agencies were missing from FBI records.

Records in the NVSS did not consistently include documentation of police officer involvement. The UCR database did not receive reports of all applicable incidents. The authors concluded that "reliable estimates of the number of justifiable homicides committed by police officers in the United States do not exist." A study of killings by police from 1999 to 2002 in the Central Florida region found that the national databases included (in Florida) only one-fourth of the number of persons killed by police as reported in the local news media.

The Death In Custody Reporting Act required states to report individuals who die in police custody. It was active without enforcement provisions from 2000 to 2006 and restored in December 2014, amended to include enforcement through the withdrawal of federal funding for non-compliant departments. An additional bill requiring all American law enforcement agencies to report killings by their officers was introduced in the U.S. Senate in June 2015.

According to the Centers for Disease Control and Prevention (CDC), based on data from medical examiners and coroners, killings by law enforcement officers (not including legal executions) was the most distinctive cause of death in Nevada, New Mexico, and Oregon from 2001 to 2010. In these states, the rate of killings by law enforcement officers was higher above national averages than any other cause of death considered. The database used to generate those statistics, the CDC WONDER Online Database, has a U.S. total of 5,511 deaths by "Legal Intervention" for the years 1999–2013 (3,483 for the years 2001–2010 used to generate the report) excluding the subcategory for legal execution.

=== Crowd-sourced projects to collect data ===
Mainly following public attention to police-related killings after several well-publicized cases in 2014 (e.g., Eric Garner, Michael Brown, and John Crawford III), several projects were begun to crowd-source data on such events. These include Fatal Encounters and U.S. Police Shootings Data at Deadspin. Another project, the Facebook page "Killed by Police" (or web-page www.KilledbyPolice.net) tracks killings starting May 1, 2013. In 2015, CopCrisis used the KilledByPolice.net data to generate info-graphics about police killings. A project affiliated with Black Lives Matter, Mapping Police Violence, tracks killings starting January 1, 2013, and conducts analyses and visualizations examining rates of killings by police department, city, state, and national trends over time.

The National Police Misconduct Reporting Project was started in 2009 by David Packman to collect daily reports of police misconduct and was taken over by the Cato Institute. The institute ceased collecting data in July 2017 and re-purposed the project to focus on qualified immunity, renaming the project "Unlawful Shield". The Puppycide Database Project collects information about police use of lethal force against animals, people killed while defending their animals from police, or killed unintentionally while police were trying to kill animals.

== Frequency ==
Deaths by age group in 2015, according to The Counted

A New York Times study reported how outcomes of active shooter attacks varied with actions of the attacker, the police (42% of total incidents), and bystanders (including a "good guy with a gun" outcome in 5.1% of total incidents).

The annual average number of justifiable homicides alone was previously estimated to be near 400. Updated estimates from the Bureau of Justice Statistics released in 2015 estimate the number to be around 930 per year, or 1,240 if assuming that non-reporting local agencies kill people at the same rate as reporting agencies. A 2019 study by Esposito, Lee, and Edwards states that police killings are a leading cause of death for men aged 25–29 at 1.8 per 100000, trailing causes such as accidental death (76.6 per 100000), suicide (26.7 per 100000), and other homicides (22.0 per 100000).

Around 2015–2016, The Guardian newspaper ran its own database, The Counted, which tracked US killings by police and other law enforcement agencies including from gunshots, tasers, car accidents and custody deaths. They counted 1,146 deaths for 2015 and 1,093 deaths for 2016. The database can be viewed by state, gender, race/ethnicity, age, classification (e.g., "gunshot"), and whether the person killed was armed.

The Washington Post has tracked shootings since 2015, reporting more than 5,000 incidents since their tracking began. The database can also classify people in various categories including race, age, weapon etc. For 2019, it reported a total of 1,004 people shot and killed by police. According to the database, 6,600 have been killed since 2015, including 6,303 men and 294 women. Among those killed, 3,878 were armed with a gun, 1,119 were armed with a knife, 218 were armed with a vehicle, 244 had a toy weapon, and 421 were unarmed.

A research brief by the Police Integrity Research Group of Bowling Green State University found that between 2005 and 2019, 104 nonfederal law enforcement officers had been arrested for murder or manslaughter for an on-duty shooting. As of 2019, 80 cases had concluded, with 35 leading to convictions, though often on lesser charges; 18 were convicted of manslaughter and four were convicted of murder.

According to an article in The Lancet, between 1980 and 2018, more than 30,000 were killed by the police. The study estimated that 55.5% of the deaths were incorrectly classified in the U.S. National Vital Statistics System, which tracks information from death certificates. Death certificates do not require coroners to list whether the police were involved in the death which may contribute to the disparity.

== Racial patterns ==
=== Civilian characteristics ===
According to The Guardian's database, in 2016 the rate of fatal police shootings per million was 10.13 for Native Americans, 6.6 for black people, 3.23 for Hispanics; 2.9 for white people and 1.17 for Asians. In absolute numbers, police kill more white people than any other race or ethnicity, understood in light of the fact that white people make up the largest proportion of the US population. As a percentage of the U.S. population, black Americans were 2.5 times more likely than whites to be killed by the police in 2015. A 2015 study found that unarmed black people were 3.49 times more likely to be shot by police than were unarmed white people. Another study published in 2016 concluded that the mortality rate of legal interventions among black and Hispanic people was 2.8 and 1.7 times higher than that among white people. Another 2015 study concluded that black people were 2.8 times more likely to be killed by police than whites. They also concluded that black people were more likely to be unarmed than white people who were in turn more likely to be unarmed than Hispanic people shot by the police. A 2018 study in the American Journal of Public Health found the mortality rate by police per 100,000 was 1.9 to 2.4 for black men, 0.8 to 1.2 for Hispanic men and 0.6 to 0.7 for white men.

The table below gives recent CDC statistics showing the proportions of fatal police shootings and all firearm deaths by race.

Firearm deaths and fatal police shootings by race (for year 2019)
	White	Black	Asian	Indigenous
Population	255,040,203	46,599,393	21,814,724	4,785,203
% of total	77.7%	14.2%	6.6%	1.5%
All firearm deaths	28,041	10,555	679	432
% of total	70.6%	26.6%	1.7%	1.1%
Fatally shot by police	355	122	23	20
% of total	68.3%	23.5%	4.4%	3.8%

A 2016 working paper in the National Bureau of Economic Research by economist Roland G. Fryer, Jr. found that while overall "blacks are 21 percent more likely than whites to be involved in an interaction with police in which at least a weapon is drawn" and that in the raw data from New York City's Stop and Frisk program "blacks and Hispanics are more than fifty percent more likely to have an interaction with police which involves any use of force" after "[p]artitioning the data in myriad ways, we find no evidence of racial discrimination in officer-involved shootings." A 2020 study by Princeton University political scientists disputed the findings by Fryer, saying that if police had a higher threshold for stopping whites, this might mean that the whites, Hispanics and blacks in Fryer's data are not similar. Nobel-laureate James Heckman and Steven Durlauf, both University of Chicago economists, published a response to the Fryer study, writing that the paper "does not establish credible evidence on the presence or absence of discrimination against African Americans in police shootings" due to issues with selection bias. Fryer responded by saying Durlauf and Heckman erroneously claim that his sample is "based on stops". Further, he states that the "vast majority of the data...is gleaned from 911 calls for service in which a civilian requests police presence."

A 2016 study published in the journal Injury Prevention concluded that African Americans, Native Americans and Latinos were more likely to be stopped by police compared to Asians and whites, but found that there was no racial bias in the likelihood of being killed or injured after being stopped. A January 2017 report by the DOJ found that the Chicago Police Department had "unconstitutionally engaged in a pattern of excessive and deadly force". A different, independent task force created by then-mayor Rahm Emanuel, stated that Chicago police "have no regard for the sanctity of life when it comes to people of color." A 2018 study found that minorities are disproportionately killed by police but that white officers are not more likely to use lethal force on blacks than minority officers. A 2019 study in The Journal of Politics found that police officers were more likely to use lethal force on blacks, but that this was "most likely driven by higher rates of police contact among African Americans rather than racial differences in the circumstances of the interaction and officer bias in the application of lethal force." A 2019 study in the journal Proceedings of the National Academy of Sciences of the United States of America (PNAS) found that blacks and American Indian/Alaska Natives are more likely to be killed by police than whites and that Latino men are more likely to be killed than white men.

A 2019 study in PNAS by Cesario et al. concluded from a dataset of fatal shootings that white officers were not more likely to shoot minority civilians than non-white officers. The study was criticized by several academics, who stated that its conclusion could not be supported by the data. A subsequent PNAS article stated that it rested on the erroneous assumption that police encounter minorities and whites at the same rate, and that if police have a higher threshold for stopping whites who engage in suspicious behavior than minorities, then the data on police shootings masks the discrimination. PNAS issued a correction to the original article in April 2020. Their corrected conclusion stated: "As the proportion of White officers in a fatal officer-involved shooting increased, a person fatally shot was not more likely to be of a racial minority." The authors retracted the study in July 2020, stating that their work was being used in public debate to support incorrect conclusions about racial bias in policing.

A 2020 study in the American Political Science Review found that administrative police records were statistically biased and underestimated the extent of racial bias in policing. A 2020 study found "strong and statistically reliable evidence of anti-Black racial disparities in the killing of unarmed Americans by police in 2015–2016," consistent with another 2020 study on racial disparities in the types of civilians shot and killed by U.S. police.

An early study, published in 1977, found that a disproportionately high percentage of those killed by police were racial minorities compared to their representation in the general population. The same study, however, noted that this proportion is consistent with the number of minorities arrested for serious felonies. A 1977 analysis of reports from major metropolitan departments found officers fired more shots at white suspects than at black suspects, possibly because of "public sentiment concerning treatment of blacks." A 1978 report found that 60 percent of black people shot by the police were armed with handguns, compared to 35 percent of white people shot.

Some studies using computer-based simulations have found police to be equally or more likely to shoot white targets than black ones. One 2014 study involving such a simulation found that police officers were not more likely to shoot black targets (although undergraduates in the same position were). Another, from Washington State University, found police officers were three times more likely to shoot unarmed white simulated suspects as to shoot black ones. The latter study hypothesized that concern with being perceived as racially biased decreased officers willingness to use deadly force against black suspects.

=== Officer characteristics ===
Cesario and coauthors in their 2019 study found that the race of police officers is not a significant predictor in the use of deadly force. Despite maintaining the validity of this conclusion, the authors eventually retracted the paper as a whole, citing "continued misuse" of their findings. According to a written statement published by the authors, their initial paper carelessly described inferences that could be drawn from their data. Specifically, this led to the use of their study to support positions regarding the role of race in police shootings more generally (including non-deadly shootings), a question outside the scope of the study, which it was not intended to investigate.

=== Gender of suspect ===
Kaminski et al. (2004) found that male officers were more likely to use a firm grip on male suspects compared to female suspects, and policemen utilized a greater amount of overall force on male suspects compared to female suspects. Other studies, such as those of Engel et al. (2000), have found mixed results regarding gender, claiming that their use of force was not significantly related to gender.

== Policy ==
Studies have shown that administrative policies regarding police use of deadly force are associated with reduced use of such force by law enforcement officers. Using less lethal weapons, such as tasers, can also significantly reduce injuries related to use-of-force events.

== Legal standards ==
In Tennessee v. Garner (1985), the Supreme Court held that "[i]t is not better that all felony suspects die than that they escape," and thus the police use of deadly force against unarmed and non-dangerous suspects is in violation of the Fourth Amendment. Following this decision, police departments across the United States adopted stricter policies regarding the use of deadly force, as well as providing de-escalation training to their officers. A 1994 study by Dr. Abraham N. Tennenbaum, a researcher at Northwestern University, found that Garner reduced police homicides by sixteen percent since its enactment. For cases where the suspect poses a threat to life, may it be the officer or another civilian, Graham v. Connor (1989) held that the use of deadly force is justified. Furthermore, Graham set the 'objectively reasonableness' standard, which has been extensively utilized by law enforcement as a defense for using deadly force; the ambiguity surrounding this standard is a subject of concern because it relies on "the perspective of a reasonable officer on the scene." Kathryn Urbonya, a law professor at the College of William & Mary, asserts that the Supreme Court appears to have two interpretations of the term 'reasonable:' one on the basis of officers being granted qualified immunity, and the other on whether the Fourth Amendment is violated. Qualified immunity, in particular, "shields an officer from suit when [he or] she makes a decision that, even if constitutionally deficient, reasonably misapprehends the law governing the circumstances [he or] she confronted." Joanna C. Schwartz, a professor at the UCLA School of Law, found that this doctrine discourages people to file cases against officers who potentially committed misconducts; only 1% of people who have cases against law enforcement actually file suit.

== See also ==
- Gun violence in the United States
- Pain compliance
- Chokehold
- Gypsy cop
- Lethal force
- Lists of killings by law enforcement officers in the United States
- List of law enforcement officers convicted for an on-duty killing in the United States
- Police accountability § Police reform in the United States
- Police brutality in the United States
- Police misconduct § United States
- Police perjury § United States
- Police riots in the United States
