= Fleeing felon rule =

Permission of shoot-to-kill on fleeing felons

In common law, the fleeing felon rule permits the use of force, including deadly force, against an individual who is suspected of a felony and is in clear flight.

== U.S. law ==
Under U.S. law the fleeing felon rule was limited in 1985 to non-lethal force in most cases by Tennessee v. Garner, 471 U.S. 1. The justices held that deadly force "may not be used unless necessary to prevent the escape and the officer has probable cause to believe that the suspect poses a significant threat of death or serious bodily harm to the officer or others."

A police officer may not seize an unarmed, nondangerous suspect by shooting him dead...however...Where the officer has probable cause to believe that the suspect poses a threat of serious physical harm, either to the officer or to others, it is not constitutionally unreasonable to prevent escape by using deadly force.

— Associate Justice Byron White, Tennessee v. Garner

Fleeing felons may be followed into places not open to the public without a warrant if the officer is in "hot pursuit."

== Case law ==
- Samuel Alito's memo written while working in the Solicitor General's office regarding Memphis Police v. Garner, which was the Sixth Circuit appellate case leading to Tennessee v. Garner. (May 18, 1984) (PDF)
- People v. Couch (1990) in the Michigan Supreme Court held that Tennessee v. Garner was
1. civil rather than criminal action;
2. did not affect Michigan's Fleeing Felon Rule; and
3. that a citizen may use deadly force when restraining a fleeing felon in a criminal matter.
- State v. Weddell, The Nevada Supreme Court ruled that a private citizen may not use deadly force under the common law fleeing felon rule.

== See also ==
- Deadly force
- Felony murder
- Fourth Amendment to the United States Constitution
- Proactive policing
