= Shooting to wound =

Intent in using a firearm

Shooting to wound is an attempt to use a firearm to harm someone without killing them. It is controversial since the unpredictable nature of firearm wounds could result in the wound failing to incapacitate the target. It may also accidentally kill or miss the target, the latter presenting a risk of unintended casualties. Limbs are one main area often targeted when shooting to wound. However, limbs are smaller and can be moved faster and more radically than the torso, so the option of shooting to wound is generally viewed with skepticism by law enforcement in the United States. The usual policy in American law enforcement agencies is that any use of a firearm corresponds to deadly force on a use of force continuum. That is, if the subject presents an immediate threat to life, targeting extremities with a firearm is unlikely to stop the threat in time due to the high difficulty and low chance of incapacitation, while one who does not present an immediate threat should not be fired upon at all. Instead, policemen are trained to aim for the "center mass" (the middle of the largest exposed area), as the aggressor is more likely to be hit and stopped.

There are numerous variables when determining how severe a gunshot wound is, such as the bullet's size, speed, and trajectory; the type of firearm is also essential in the examination. The severity is also dependent on the location of the wound; individuals who suffer gunshot wounds require specific medical procedures to reduce the likelihood of death, permanent disability, or other complications; they also require immediate medical services. Even if the victim survives, they may have a permanent disability, trauma, or lifelong damage as a result of the wound.

== See also ==
- Warning shot
- Non-lethal weapon
