= Killing of Samuel DuBose =

Shooting of unarmed man by Cincinnati police

- Date: July 19, 2015
- Time: 6:30 p.m. EDT
- Location: Cincinnati, Ohio, U.S.; 39.12322°N 84.51319°W
- Type: Homicide by shooting, police killing
- Filmed by: Tensing's bodycam
- Deaths: Samuel DuBose
- Accused: Raymond Tensing
- Charges: Murder; Voluntary manslaughter
- Verdict: 2016 trial: Hung jury; 2017 retrial: Hung jury; Charges dismissed with prejudice

On July 19, 2015, in Cincinnati, Ohio, Samuel DuBose, a Black unarmed non-university-affiliated motorist, was fatally shot by Ray Tensing, a University of Cincinnati police officer, after Dubose was stopped outside of the university campus for driving a car without a front license plate.

After opening DuBose’s door and reaching into the window, Tensing pulled his gun and shot him in the head, killing him immediately. DuBose was unarmed and sitting in his car with his seat belt on at the time of the killing. Tensing shot DuBose in the head right as DuBose turned the key in the car ignition and put the car in drive after refusing to get out of the car and pulling the door shut. Tensing told police he had to shoot DuBose in the head because DuBose was dragging him down the street.

Prosecutors investigated and found that video footage from Tensing's bodycam showed that he was indeed not dragged or caught in the vehicle at any time. Prosecutor Deters and a grand jury indicted Ray Tensing on charges of murder and voluntary manslaughter. Tensing was then fired from the police department. A judge put Tensing on a $1 million bond, and Tensing was released on bail shortly after being arrested.

A November 2016 trial ended in mistrial after the jury became deadlocked. A retrial begun in May 2017 also ended in a hung jury. The charges against Tensing were later dismissed with prejudice though Prosecutor Deters continued to assert that Tensing should have been convicted for shooting Sam DuBose in the head without provocation.

== Backgrounds ==
=== Samuel DuBose ===
Samuel Vincent DuBose (March 12, 1972 – July 19, 2015), a black 43-year-old man, was a rapper, music producer, entrepreneur, and motorcycle enthusiast. He was the founder of a motorcycle club, Ruthless Riders. He attended high school in Cincinnati and was the father of 13 children. He was deeply loved by his family, friends and many in the community. He was not affiliated with the University of Cincinnati.

=== Raymond Tensing ===
Raymond Tensing (born November 13, 1989), a white police officer who was 25 years old at the time of the shooting, had four years of law enforcement experience. He joined the University of Cincinnati Police Department (UCPD) in April 2014, having previously been a well-regarded officer with the department of Greenhills, Ohio. He had left the Ohio State Highway Patrol's training academy after attending for just one day. According to a highway patrol spokesman, he was unable to adapt to the physical and mental requirements.

During the criminal investigation and trial, it was learned that Tensing led his police department in arrests and citations and had the largest racial disparity of any other police officer. Black people accounted for 82.5% of Tensing's arrests, according to a report cited by the prosecutor.

In 2015, a YouTube video was uploaded by WCPO 9 News Cincinnati where Tensing is seen unlawfully questioning a passenger of a vehicle that had been stopped due to a dragging bumper. Tensing initially refused to call a supervisor and refused to identify himself or badge number. A supervisor was eventually called to the scene and confirmed that the passenger was within his rights to not identify and that the officer should only have been talking to the driver. Tensing detained the two black men for close to 20 minutes, refusing to write the routine citation and let them go.

=== University of Cincinnati Police Department ===
The University of Cincinnati Police Department is certified by the state of Ohio and has full police authority throughout the state. They focus their patrols areas on three campuses and the areas around them. UCPD officers receive 616 hours of training at the police academy, plus 80 of rookie training, while city police officers spend 1,040 hours in training.

Since the UCPD's patrol area was expanded to include neighboring areas in 2009, the number of reported crimes in those areas was cut in half by 2014. Officers increased their traffic stops on- and off-campus, tripling the number from 2012 to 2015.

Of its 72 officers, four are African American and one is Asian American. Unlike the Cincinnati Police Department (CPD), the UCPD was not included in federally mandated reforms following the nearby riots of 2001 that had been in reaction to a shooting of a young black man by city police. One UCPD chief resigned in 2013 amid reported low morale, and he was not replaced immediately. Two other black men had been killed by UCPD officers, both with Tasers: a mental patient in 2010 and a student in 2011.

== Shooting ==
At 6:30 p.m., on Rice Street near Thill Street in the Mount Auburn district, Tensing was patrolling off-campus when he stopped DuBose for failure to display a front license plate, which was a primary offense for vehicles with Ohio license plates. The incident was recorded on Tensing's bodycam, which he activated before the traffic stop.

External videos
- Tensing's bodycam on YouTube (26:26)
- Kidd's bodycam on YouTube (27:27)
- Lindenschmidt's bodycam on YouTube (8:58)

Seen in the bodycam video, Tensing repeatedly requests a driver's license and DuBose replies that he has a driver's license, then stating that he does not have it with him. Tensing asks, "Are you suspended?" Tensing starts to open the driver's door and orders DuBose to remove his seat belt. DuBose pulls the door closed, starts the engine, and puts the car in drive.

Within seconds, Tensing reaches into the car with his left hand, yells "Stop! Stop!", draws his gun and shoots Sam DuBose directly in the head, killing him instantly. Sources differed as to whether the car was moving before the shot was fired. According to the Kroll Report, "it is difficult to determine with precision how much, if at all, the car moved [prior to the gunshot], but whatever movement may have occurred appears to have been minimal" and doesn't serve as justification for Tensing shooting DuBose. The Kroll reported calls the entire shooting unjustified in a detailed report.

After shooting DuBose in the head, Tensing falls away from the vehicle. The vehicle accelerates down the road when DuBose's dead body weight continues to press against the accelerator. After travelling about 400 feet (120 m), the vehicle collided into a telephone pole and came to a stop. After the officers reach the car, the video shows DuBose inside with a gunshot wound to his head. The county coroner's preliminary autopsy results, released on July 31, confirmed that as the cause of death.

In bodycam footage, Tensing repeatedly tells other officers that he was dragged when his arm became caught in the car, possibly in the steering wheel. In the police report that he filed after the incident, he stated that he was dragged, forcing him to fire his weapon. Through lawyers, he released a public statement that he was afraid that he would be run over. On July 29, authorities released Tensing's bodycam video, which, according to prosecutors, shows that Tensing was not dragged.

A day after the killing, it was reported that DuBose was driving on an indefinitely suspended driver's license, and had four bags and a jar of marijuana and about $2,600 cash in the car.

=== Investigation and police reports ===
UCPD officers Phillip Kidd and David Lindenschmidt arrived at the scene just after the gunshot. In his bodycam video, Kidd is heard supporting Tensing's statement that he was dragged by the car. According to County Prosecutor Joe Deters, neither officer stated in his official statement to Cincinnati police that he saw Tensing being dragged. Officer-in-Training Lindenschmidt, who had started working in the field only that month, made what have been called "rookie mistakes" in picking up Tensing's fallen flashlight and moving Tensing's vehicle.

Eric Weibel, a UCPD officer who did not witness the shooting, stated in a report that Tensing's uniform looked like he had been dragged. It was later determined that the dirt on Tensing's uniform got there after Tensing shot DuBose in the head and fell to the ground.

The CPD took over the investigation soon after they were called to the scene. During the CPD investigation, Tensing did not have any officer corroborate his account of being dragged. During the trial, the officers on the scene testified that they never saw Ray Tensing being dragged at all. Officers admitted to originally taking Tensing's word for this account, but they each acknowledged that they never witnessed DuBose drag or assault Tensing.

== Aftermath ==
=== Official reactions ===
On July 29, Hamilton County Prosecuting Attorney Joe Deters stated in a press conference that the shooting was "asinine" and "senseless". He said that DuBose was not acting violently or aggressively. With "an abundance of caution in anticipation" of Deters' announcement, the University of Cincinnati closed its Uptown and Medical campuses at 11:00 a.m. The campuses resumed normal operations the next day.

On July 31, the Fraternal Order of Police–Ohio Labor Council, a union that represents UCPD employees, filed a grievance asking that Tensing be reinstated to his position on the police force, asserting that he was terminated "without just cause". Resolution of the grievance is postponed pending the outcome of the criminal case.

In the wake of the shooting, Deters called for the disbandment of the UCPD force and its replacement with city police officers. The incident also drew attention to the presence of armed law enforcement on college campuses. There was some public and academic criticism of Deters' comments, on the basis that his rhetoric would jeopardize Tensing's right to a fair trial and that they were anti-police.

The Chief of the CPD said that the memorandum of understanding, signed in 2009 by his predecessor, which allowed UCPD to patrol areas neighboring the university, should be revoked. He said, "I don't believe their officers have the skill set to police Cincinnati with the same philosophy of fairness and cultural competency that my officers display."

=== Public reactions ===
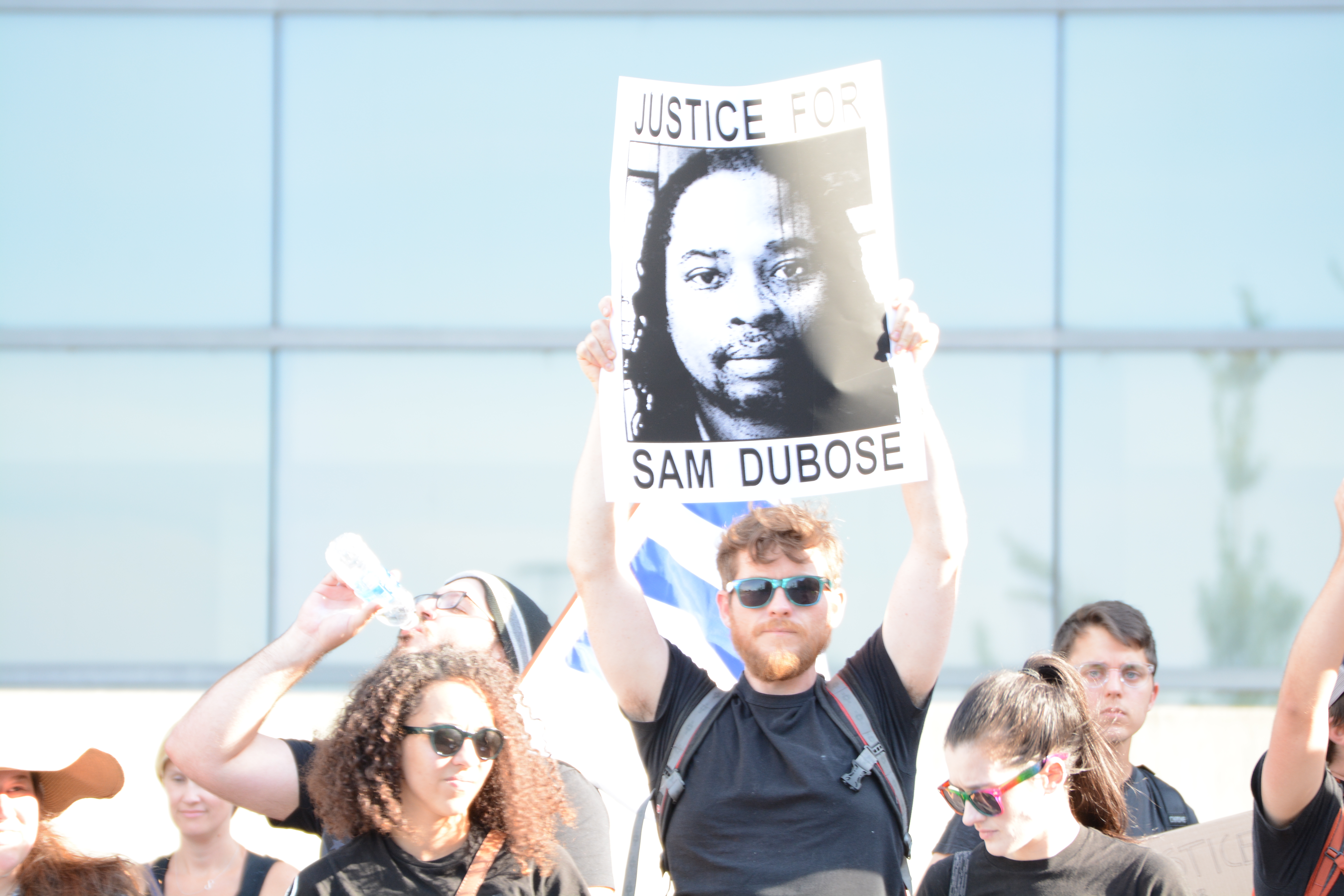
Protesters holding a sign in honor of DuBose

The body camera recording of Tensing shooting DuBose has garnered considerable attention. The footage has been compared to a first-person-shooter video game and described as so "disturbing" that Cincinnati police prepared for large protests and riots before the footage's release.

As of July 30, at least four demonstrations have been held around the country in response to DuBose's death. A Black Lives Matter vigil and rally in support of DuBose was held in Cincinnati on July 31, the third such event since the shooting. The victim's mother said, "As long as we stand up for the righteous, we going to be OK. I would come out here every night, I will go city to city because now I'm involved, my child was involved." Participants chanted "I am Sam DuBose."

Around 300 participants subsequently walked through Over-the-Rhine to Fountain Square. Six people were arrested on charges of disorderly conduct and resisting arrest during the march. One hundred protesters joined a "United March for Justice" on September 19, linking DuBose's killing with the deaths of Tamir Rice, John Crawford, and Samantha Ramsey.

=== Kroll Report ===
A report, commonly called the "Kroll Report", released in September 2015 by Kroll Inc., a risk consulting firm hired by the university, said that Tensing's bodycam video showed that he was not dragged. It also said that the car had not moved, or had barely moved, before the gunshot was fired. The Kroll report concluded that Ray Tensing was never dragged, that Ray Tensing violated several police protocols and that he unnecessarily escalated the situation. The report indicated that Sam DuBose did not follow the officer's orders. Tensing's attorney said, "I don't agree with their analysis or their conclusions." The report's recommendations include reviewing the scope of the UCPD's jurisdiction, improving relevant training and policies, clarifying reporting requirements following officer-involved shootings, providing cultural diversity training, and assessing the diversity of officers within the UCPD.

=== University reactions ===
Following the shooting the UCPD stopped making off-campus traffic stops.

On October 16, a student group, named "Irate 8" for the eight percent of black students at University of Cincinnati campuses, presented a list of demands to the university president. The list includes taking officers Kidd and Lindenschmidt off patrol, conducting full background checks of police and other university employees, and mandating racial sensitivity training for all staff and students. President Santa Ono agreed to meet with them and discuss their demands.

== Legal proceedings ==
Kidd and Lindenschmidt were not indicted by the grand jury. After the officers corrected their initial statements, Prosecutor Deters said, "These officers have been truthful and honest about what happened and no charges are warranted.". Kidd and Lindenschmidt were placed on administrative leave during a university investigation.

Ten days after killing Sam DuBose with gunshot to the head, Ray Tensing was indicted on charges of murder and voluntary manslaughter on July 29, 2015. The murder charge carries a penalty of life imprisonment without the possibility of parole for 15 years. As a result of the indictment, he was fired from the UCPD. At his July 30 arraignment, he pleaded not guilty to the charges, and he was released on $1 million bond later that day.

A trial began on October 31, 2016; on November 12, the judge declared a mistrial after the jury became deadlocked. Ten days later the prosecution announced that they intended to retry Tensing, requesting a change of venue due to the amount of publicity surrounding the case in the Cincinnati area. A judge denied the change of venue, while extending a gag order in the case. A retrial was slated to begin on May 25, 2017.

The presiding judge ruled that prosecutors could not present the T-shirt Tensing was wearing at the time of the shooting to the jury. The shirt depicted a Confederate battle flag, and the judge agreed with Tensing's defense that allowing the shirt as evidence would be prejudicial.

On June 23, 2017, the second trial also ended in mistrial due to a deadlocked jury. On July 18, 2017, Deters said he was dropping the case against Tensing, as two previous juries could not reach a unanimous agreement on murder and voluntary manslaughter charges.

Stew Mathews, Tensing's attorney, said that Tensing was being dragged by the car, and that the officer fired in self-defense while fearing for his life. Mathews said that video from Lindenschmidt's bodycam helped substantiate that claim. However, video forensics expert and FBI instructor Grant Fredericks disagreed with these claims—testifying the video showed Tensing had never been dragged, and in fact pulled and aimed his gun at Dubose's head before the vehicle moved. Fredericks further testified he believed the vehicle's later acceleration occurred after the shooting, as a result of a "post-mortem reflex."

In January 2016, following two days of mediation with civil rights attorney Al Gerhardstein, the University of Cincinnati agreed to pay US$4.85 million to the DuBose family. In addition to financial compensation, the settlement included free undergraduate education for DuBose's children, the creation of a memorial in his name, an apology from the school's president, and engagement by the family in police reform at the university. It also protected all potential defendants from any future civil litigation in DuBose's death.

On March 23, 2018, the University of Cincinnati settled a grievance that the Ohio police union filed on behalf of Ray Tensing. The settlement provided Tensing with $250,000 plus costs/fees. This caused further outrage in the community.

== See also ==
- List of unarmed African Americans killed by law enforcement officers in the United States
- List of killings by law enforcement officers in the United States
