= PIT maneuver =

Tactic to stop a pursued vehicle

PIT maneuver diagram (animated GIF image)

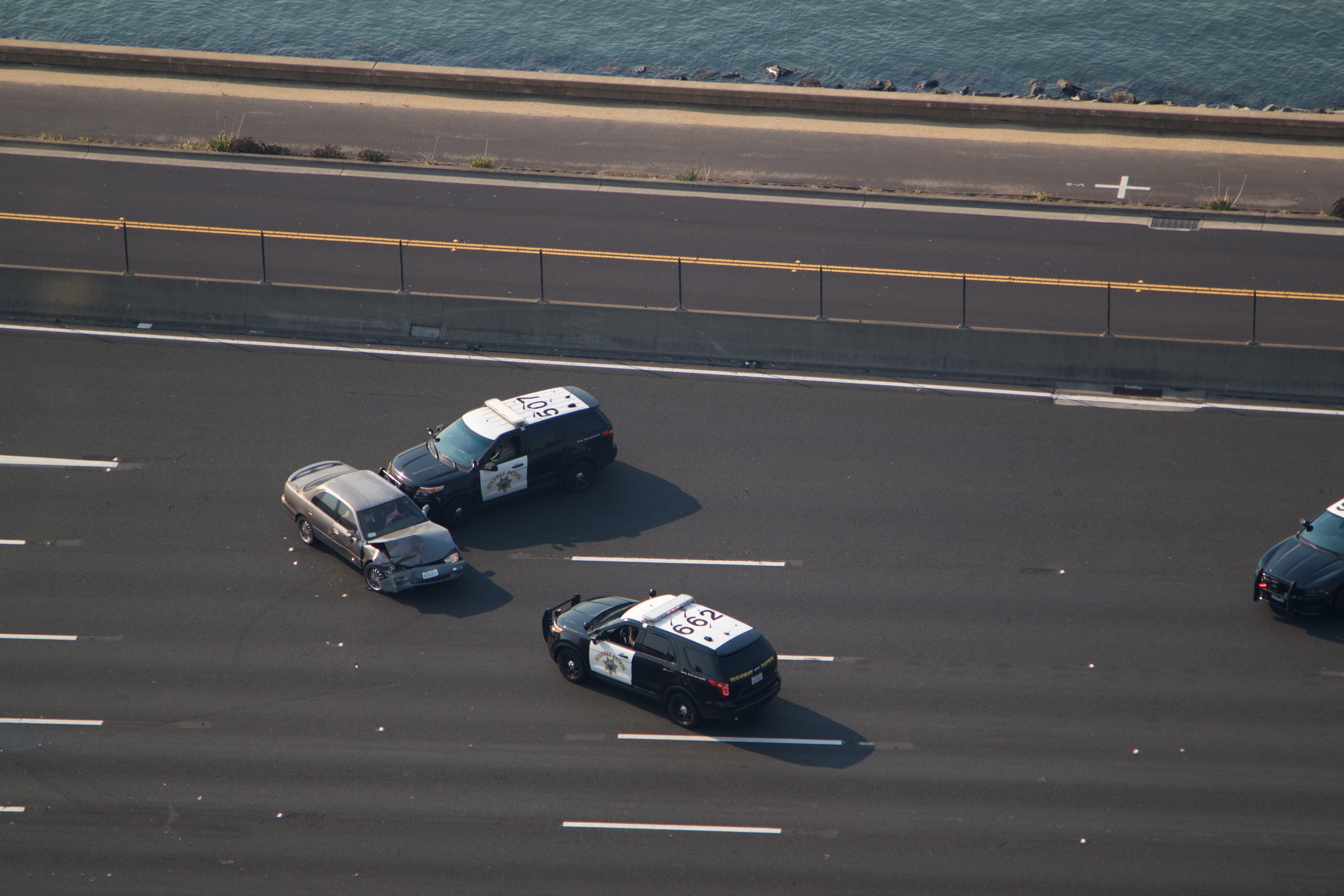
Two California Highway Patrol Ford Police Interceptor Utility and one Dodge Charger cruiser use the PIT maneuver to disable a fleeing vehicle

The precision immobilization technique (PIT) maneuver, also known as tactical vehicle intervention or tactical vehicle interception (TVI), is a law-enforcement tactic in which a pursuing vehicle strikes the side-rear of a pursued vehicle, causing it to swing around and come to an unplanned stop. Ideally, the struck vehicle rotates 180 degrees and winds up facing the opposite direction of travel. The PIT technique was developed in the late 1980s by BSR Inc. (a private company for law enforcement training registered in Jefferson County, West Virginia) and was first used by the Fairfax County Police Department in Virginia in 1988. Some law-enforcement agencies use the PIT maneuver regularly to end vehicle pursuits, some use it only under certain conditions, and others avoid its use entirely because it can kill or injure motorists and bystanders.

== Procedure ==
A police vehicle begins a PIT maneuver by pulling alongside the fleeing vehicle so that the portion of the pursuer's vehicle forward of its front wheels is aligned with the portion of the target vehicle behind its back wheels. The pursuer then steers sharply into the target vehicle, with some acceleration to ensure its bumper does not slide off the target. In a successful PIT maneuver, the driver of the target vehicle loses control, sending the vehicle off the road or into a barrier and eventually to a stop. Forces of motion tend to cause the fleeing vehicle to spin. At high speeds, the sudden lateral movement can lead to rollover collisions.

== History ==
The PIT originated in West Virginia during the late 1980s with a goal of halting fleeing vehicles as "tactical vehicle interception (T.V.I.)". The first U.S. law enforcement agency to teach PIT was the Fairfax County Police Department in Virginia, which modified the technique's parameters for initiation and execution in police tactics.

== Safety risks ==
Police pursuit policies in general—and the PIT maneuver specifically—are controversial because of risk of injury or death to both involved and uninvolved parties.

From 2016 to 2020, police officers in the U.S. killed at least 30 people while using the PIT maneuver, including 18 after officers attempted to stop motorists for minor traffic violations.

While some police departments in the United States consider the PIT maneuver as an intermediate force option that can end a pursuit, others, like the state of Illinois, consider "forcible stop techniques" to be "use of deadly force" if performed at speeds above 20 miles per hour (32 km/h). Many police departments have regulations that limit its use to serious situations, including pursuit of drivers with outstanding warrants or who are considered likely to be dangerous for other reasons.

The Arkansas State Police have performed at least two controversial PIT maneuvers. In June 2020, a trooper used it against a pregnant driver who was searching for a place to pull over. As part of a legal settlement with the driver, the State Police agreed to improve training and restrict the use of the PIT maneuver and use it only in cases to "protect a third person or an officer from imminent death or serious physical injury." In September 2023, a trooper resigned after performing a PIT maneuver on the wrong vehicle during a high-speed chase.

On December 4, 2018, a police officer in South Fulton, Georgia, performed a PIT maneuver on a stolen Hyundai Sonata while passing a cluster of townhouses, spinning the car into a utility pole with power lines. The Hyundai hit and killed a 41-year-old man, Marcus McCrary, who was walking nearby. The driver ran from the scene and evaded capture.

In April 2024, in Newberry, Florida, four teenagers died during a police pursuit started by the Bradford County Sheriff's office. The teens, who were between 14 and 16 years old and attended Newberry High School, were killed when a Florida Highway Patrol trooper performed a PIT maneuver on the stolen SUV they were driving.

In March 2025, one passenger died and three were injured after Arkansas State Police performed a PIT maneuver while chasing a pickup truck on I-40. Police found firearms, promethazine and other illicit substances in the truck, and charged the driver of the truck with first-degree murder for the passenger's death.

== See also ==
- Aggressive driving
- Police use of deadly force in the United States
- Police vehicles in the United States and Canada
- Spike strip
- Vehicle dynamics
