= Mullenix v. Luna =

- Supreme Court of the United States

Decided November 9, 2015
- Full case name: Chadrin Lee Mullenix v. Beatrice Luna, Individually and as Representative of the Estate of Israel Leija, Jr., et al.
- Docket no.: 14-1143
- Citations: 577 U.S. ___ (more) 136 S. Ct. 305; 193 L. Ed. 2d 255; 2015 U.S. LEXIS 7160

Case history
- Prior: On Writ of Certiorari to the United States Court of Appeals for the Fifth Circuit
- Procedural: Summary judgment denied, 2013 WL 4017124 (N.D. Tex., Aug. 7, 2013); aff'd, 773 F. 3d 712 (5th Cir. 2014); opinion withdrawn, substituted opinion at 777 F. 3d 221 (5th Cir. 2014); rehearing en banc denied, 77 F. 3d 221 (2014)

Holding
- A police officer who shot and killed a fleeing suspect during a police pursuit was entitled to qualified immunity because existing precedent did not establish "beyond debate" that the officer's actions were objectively unreasonable.

Court membership
- Chief Justice John Roberts Associate Justices Antonin Scalia · Anthony Kennedy; Clarence Thomas · Ruth Bader Ginsburg; Stephen Breyer · Samuel Alito; Sonia Sotomayor · Elena Kagan

Case opinions
- Per curiam
- Concurrence: Scalia (in judgment)
- Dissent: Sotomayor

Laws applied
- U.S. Const. amend. IV

Mullenix v. Luna, 577 U.S. ___ (2015), was a case in which the Supreme Court of the United States held that a police officer who shot a suspect during a police pursuit was entitled to qualified immunity. In a per curiam opinion, the Court held that prior precedent did not establish "beyond debate" that the officer's actions were objectively unreasonable.

== Background ==
=== Pursuit and death of Israel Leija, Jr. ===
On March 23, 2010, officers in the Tulia, Texas Police Department engaged Israel Leija Jr. in a high-speed pursuit where Leija's vehicle reached speeds between 85 and 110 miles per hour. During the pursuit, Leija made two telephone calls to the Tulia, Texas police dispatcher stating that he had a gun and that he would shoot officers if they did not abandon the pursuit. The dispatcher relayed these calls to pursuing officers, as well as an additional report that Leija may have been intoxicated. Texas Department of Public Safety trooper Chadrin Mullenix responded to the pursuit and positioned himself on an overpass above the freeway on which Leija was traveling. Despite direct orders not to fire from the overpass, Mullenix fired six shots in the direction of Leija's vehicle. Four of those shots struck and killed Leija.

=== Trial and appeal to Fifth Circuit ===
Leija's family sued Mullenix under 42 U.S.C. § 1983, claiming that Mullenix conducted an unconstitutional seizure by using excessive force against Leija. Mullenix filed a motion for summary judgment in which he argued that he was entitled to qualified immunity. The district court denied Mullenix's motion, and the United States Court of Appeals for the Fifth Circuit affirmed the district court's ruling. The Fifth Circuit held that the "immediacy of the risk posed by Leija is a disputed fact that a reasonable jury could find either in the plaintiffs’ favor or in the officer's favor, precluding us from concluding that Mullenix acted objectively reasonably as a matter of law". Mullenix then petitioned the Fifth Circuit for rehearing en banc, but the court reaffirmed the denial of qualified immunity. The Fifth Circuit concluded that "the law was clearly established such that a reasonable officer would have known that the use of deadly force, absent a sufficiently substantial and immediate threat, violated the Fourth Amendment".

== Opinion of the Court ==
On November 9, 2015, the Supreme Court of the United States issued a per curiam opinion that addressed only the qualified immunity question; the Court did not address whether Mullenix's actions violated the Fourth Amendment. The Court began its analysis by noting that police officers are entitled to qualified immunity in suits filed under 42 U.S.C. § 1983 as long as the officer's conduct does not violate "clearly established statutory or constitutional rights of which a reasonable person would have known". The Court explained that there need not be "a case directly on point, but existing precedent must have placed the statutory or constitutional question beyond debate". Applying these principles to the facts of this case, the Court held that prior precedent did not establish "beyond debate" that Mullenix's actions were objectively unreasonable. Consequently, the Court reversed the Fifth Circuit's determination that Mullenix was not entitled to qualified immunity.

=== Concurring and dissenting opinions ===
Justice Antonin Scalia wrote an opinion concurring in the judgment; he argued that Mullenix did not actually apply deadly force in this case. Because Mullenix intended only to stop Leija's car by destroying its engine, the gunshots were not "deadly force" because they were not "applied with the object of harming the body of the felon". Justice Scalia claimed, "It does not assist analysis to refer to all use of force that happens to kill the arrestee as the application of deadly force". Additionally, Justice Sonia Sotomayor wrote a dissenting opinion in which she argued that Mullenix was not entitled to qualified immunity because "it was clearly established under the Fourth Amendment that an officer in Mullenix’s position should not have fired the shots". She argued, "It is clearly established that there must be some governmental interest that necessitates deadly force" and that in this case, "neither petitioner nor the majority can point to any possible marginal gain in shooting at the car over" other nonlethal alternatives. She wrote, "[b]y sanctioning a 'shoot first, think later' approach to policing, the Court renders the protections of the Fourth Amendment hollow".

== See also ==
- List of United States Supreme Court cases
- Lists of United States Supreme Court cases by volume
- List of United States Supreme Court cases by the Roberts Court
- Graham v. Connor
