= Deadly force =

Use of force likely to cause serious bodily injury or death to another person

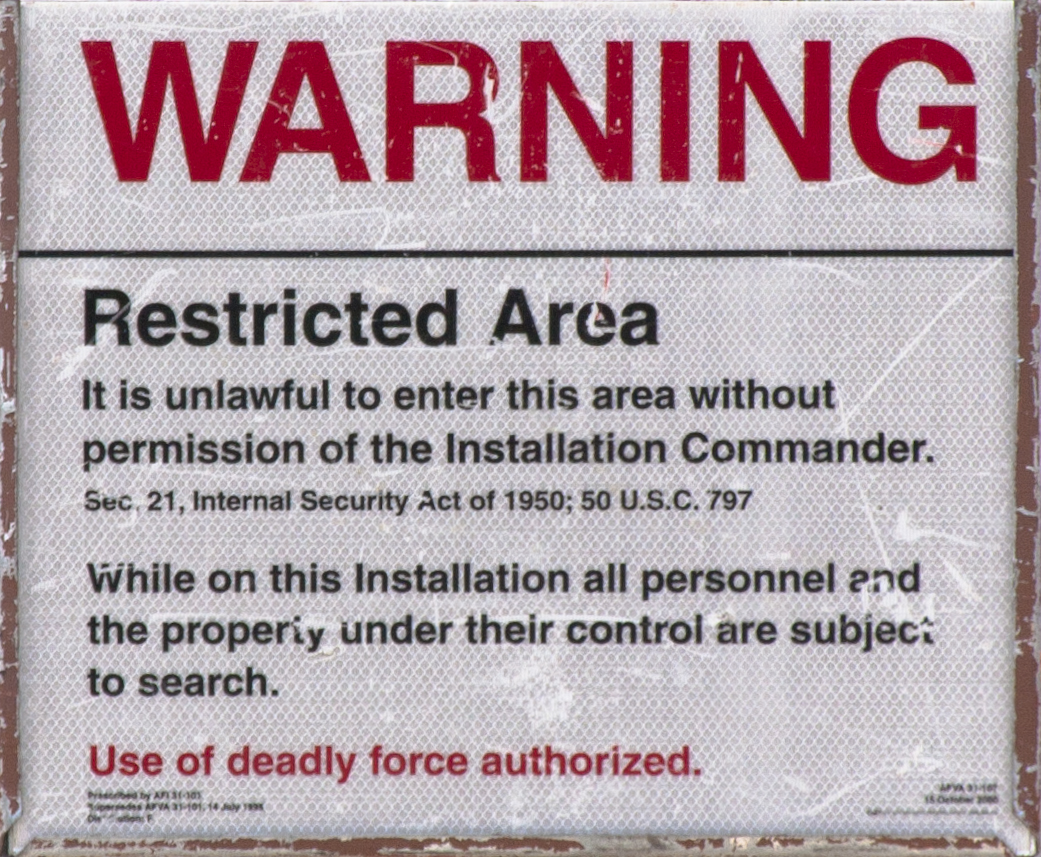
Warning sign at Langley Air Force Base

Deadly force, also known as lethal force, is a concept in law of the civilian use of force that is likely to cause serious bodily injury or death to another civilian person. In most jurisdictions, the use of deadly force is justified only under conditions of extreme necessity as a last resort, when all lesser means have failed or cannot reasonably be employed.

Firearms, bladed weapons, explosives, and vehicles are among those weapons the use of which is considered deadly force. The use of non-traditional weapons in an offensive manner, such as a baseball bat, sharp pencil, tire iron, or other, may also be considered deadly force.

== United Kingdom ==
The Criminal Justice and Immigration Act 2008 allows householders to use reasonable force against intruders. In certain circumstances this can be lethal force.

== United States law ==
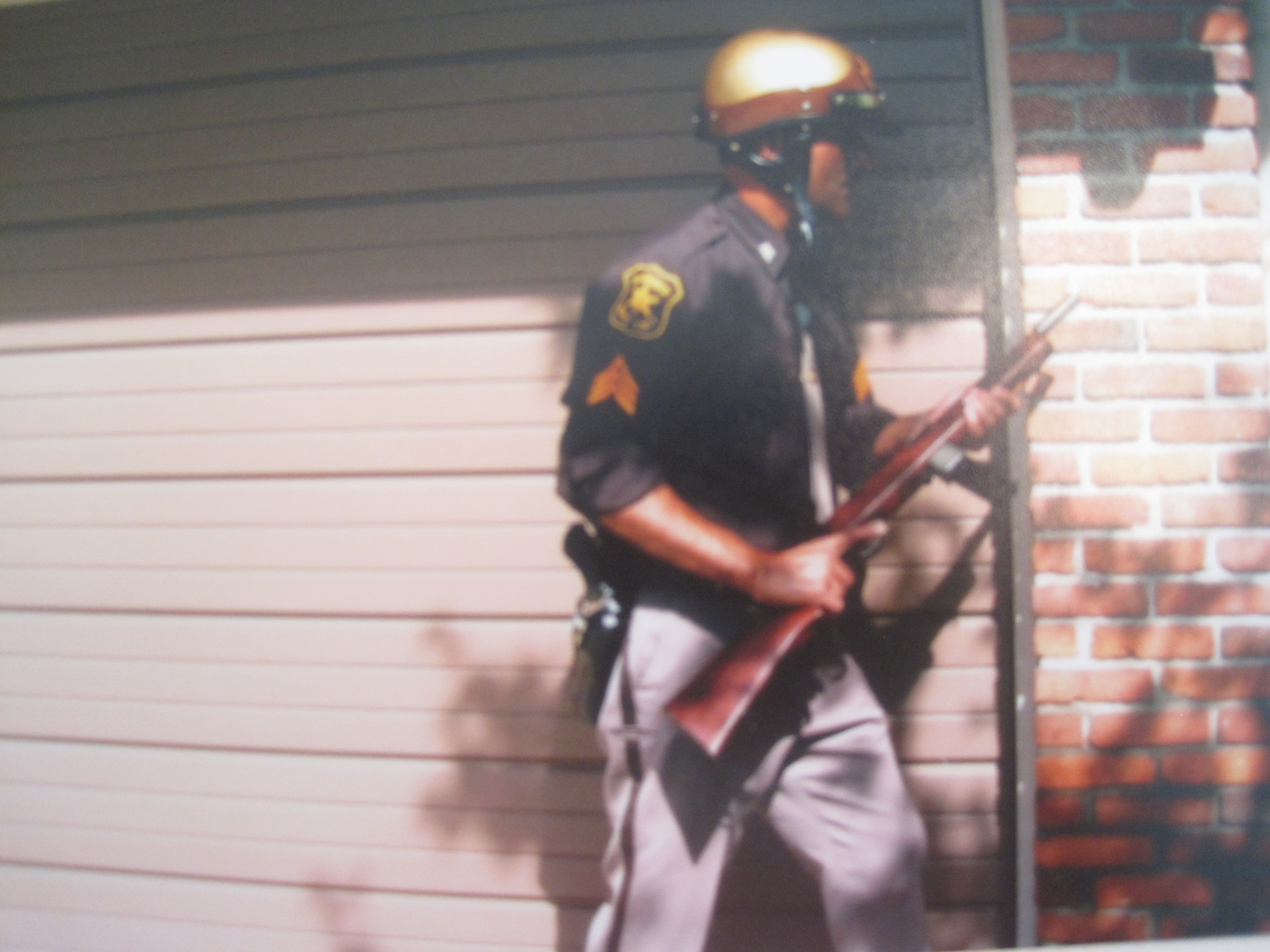
Deputy Sheriff with Reising submachine gun.

The United States Armed Forces defines deadly force as "Force that is likely to cause, or that a person knows or should know would create a substantial risk of causing, death or serious bodily harm or injury.". In the United States, the use of deadly force by sworn law enforcement officers is lawful when the officer reasonably believes the subject poses a significant threat of serious bodily injury or death to themselves or others. The use of deadly force by law enforcement is also lawful when used to prevent the escape of a fleeing felon when the officer believes escape would pose a significant threat of serious bodily injury or death to members of the public. Common law allowed officers to use any force necessary to effect a felony arrest, but this was narrowed in the Tennessee v. Garner ruling in 1985 when the U.S. Supreme Court said that "deadly force...may not be used unless necessary to prevent the escape, and the officer has probable cause to believe that the suspect poses a significant threat of death or serious bodily harm to the officer or others."

In the 1989 Graham v. Connor ruling, the Supreme Court expanded its definition to include the "objective reasonableness" standard—not subjective as to what the officer's intent might have been—and it must be judged from the perspective of a reasonable officer at the scene—and its calculus must embody the fact that police officers are often forced to make split-second decisions about the amount of force necessary in a particular situation.

Most law enforcement agencies establish a use of force continuum, starting with simple presence through deadly force. With this model, officers attempt to control subjects and situations with the minimum force necessary. Agencies often have policies limiting the force used to be equal or one step higher on the continuum relative to the force they are opposing.

A civilian's use of deadly force is generally justified if they reasonably believe that they or another person are in imminent danger of death or serious injury. Justification and affirmative defenses vary by state and may include certain property crimes, specific crimes against children, or the prevention of sexual assaults.

U.S. law requires an investigation whenever a person causes another person's death, but the mechanism for such investigations can vary by state. The investigation develops evidence regarding the use of deadly physical force for a particular state or jurisdiction. An investigation may be performed by a local or state police agency and also a civilian agency, such as a county prosecutor or State Attorney General. A report of the findings of such an investigation may be submitted for prosecution and made public.

The US police killing rate is 3.05 police killings per million of population. The US police killing rate of Blacks is 5.34 per million; of Hispanics is 2.63 per million; of Whites is 1.87 per million, and of others is 1.5 per million of population. The US police killing rate of Blacks is 2.86 times the US police killing rate of Whites. US police killing rates compare unfavorably with other jurisdictions.

=== In relation to motor vehicles ===
In Scott v. Harris, No. 05-1631 (April 30, 2007)., the U.S. Supreme Court held that a police officer's attempt to terminate a dangerous high-speed car chase that threatened the lives of innocent bystanders did not violate the Fourth Amendment, even when it places the fleeing motorist at risk of serious bodily injury or death. In the Harris case, Officer Scott applied his police car's push bumper to the rear of the suspect's vehicle, causing the suspect vehicle to lose control and crash, resulting in the fleeing suspect being paralyzed from the waist down.

Traditionally, intentional contact between vehicles has been characterized as unlawful deadly force, though some U.S. federal appellate cases have mitigated this precedent. In Adams v. St. Lucie County Sheriff's Department, 998 F.2d 923 (11th Cir. 1992)., the Eleventh Circuit Court of Appeals ruled that, although fatalities may result from intentional collisions between automobiles, such fatalities are infrequent and therefore unlawful deadly force should not be presumed to be the level of force applied in such incidents; the Adams case was subsequently called into question by Harris v Coweta County, 406 F.3d 1307 (11th Cir. 2005)., which in turn was reversed by the U.S. Supreme Court in the Scott v. Harris case discussed above; the extent to which Adams can continue to be relied on is uncertain. In the Adams case, the officer rammed the suspect's vehicle.

In Donovan v. City of Milwaukee, 17 F.3d 944 (7th Cir. 1994)., the Seventh Circuit Court of Appeals recognized this principle but added that collisions between automobiles and motorcycles frequently lead to the death of the motorcyclist, and therefore a presumption that unlawful deadly force was used in such intentional collisions is more appropriate. In the Donovan case, the suspect lost control of his motorcycle and became airborne, crashing into the officer's vehicle, which was parked as part of an intercepting roadblock.

=== Situational threats ===
There are two main types of critical threats a suspect may pose: 1) escape and 2) physical harm. The latter threat involves a threat of violence, bodily harm, and/or death. If the suspect threatens to harm civilians and/or officers, then those officers must act to protect themselves and the public. In such a scenario, the perception of the officer(s) is critical. If there is a realistically perceived threat (i.e., the suspect is putting lives in danger), then officers may take the life of the suspect in order to protect themselves and the public. However, these situations can become complicated if the threat is not perceived as 'genuine', or if the suspect is in a location in which the use of deadly force to subdue the suspect may place other innocent bystander lives in danger.

== See also ==
- Fleeing felon rule
- Justifiable homicide
- Licence to kill (concept)
- Non-lethal weapon
- Peelian principles
- Plummer v. State
- Tennessee v. Garner
- Graham v. Connor
- Proactive policing
- Rules of engagement
- Self-defense
- Stand-your-ground law
