= Use of force =

Force needed to compel compliance

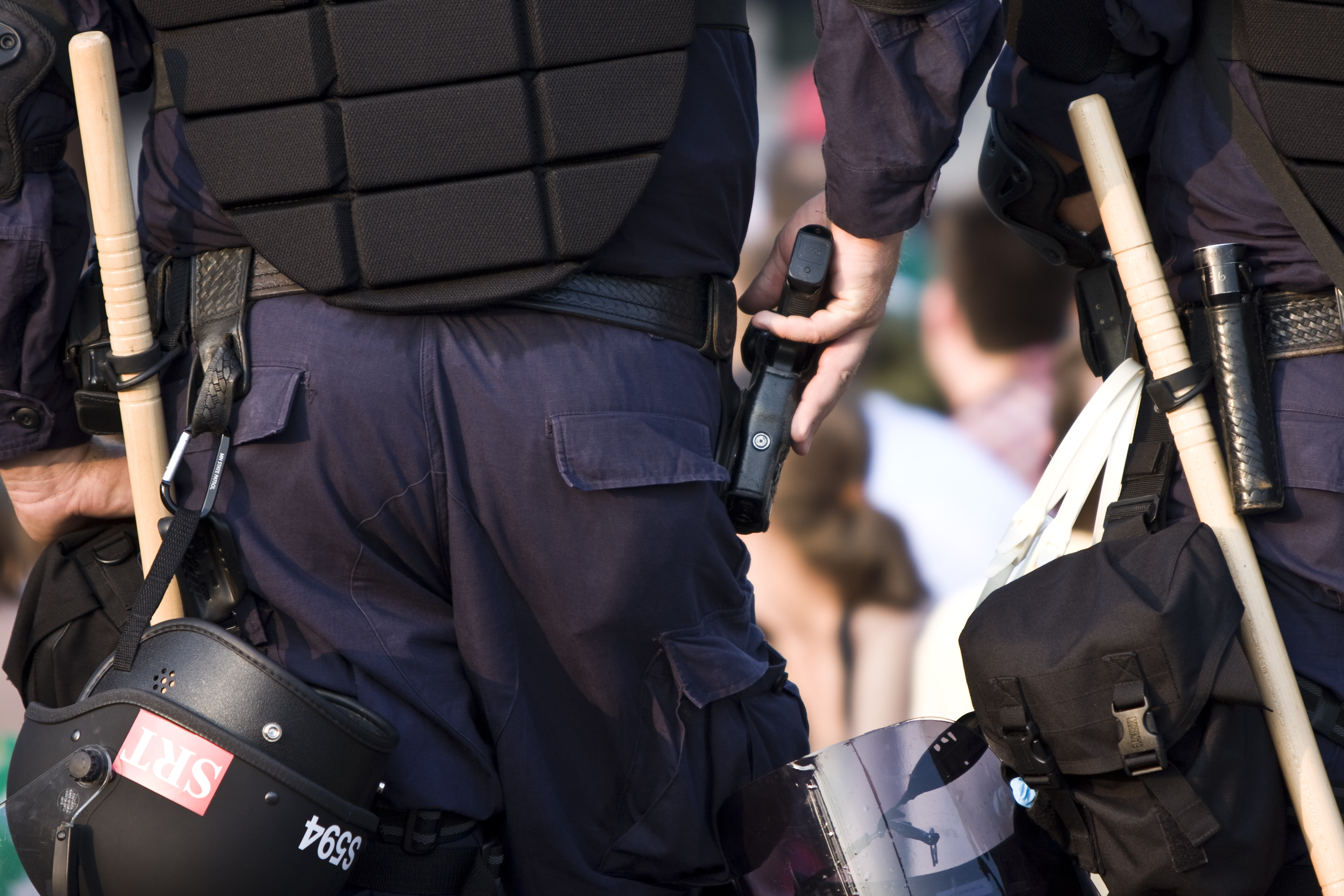
A St. Paul Police SRT indexing a handgun in a gun holster

The use of force, in the context of law enforcement, may be defined as "the amount of effort required by police to compel compliance by an unwilling subject." Multiple definitions exist according to context and purpose. In practical terms, use of force amounts to any combination of threatened or actual force used for a lawful purpose, e.g. to effect arrest; defend oneself or another person; or to interrupt a crime in progress or prevent an imminent crime. Depending on the jurisdiction, legal rights of this nature might be recognized to varying degrees for both police officers and non-sworn individuals; and may be accessible regardless of citizenship. Canada's Criminal Code, for example, provides in section 494 for arrest in certain circumstances by "any one."

Use of force doctrines can be employed by law enforcement officers and military personnel, who are on guard duty. The aim of such doctrines is to balance the needs of security with ethical concerns for the rights and well-being of intruders or suspects. Injuries to civilians tend to focus attention on self-defense as a justification and in the event of death, the notion of justifiable homicide.

Police use physical force to the extent necessary to secure observance of the law or to restore order only when the exercise of persuasion, advice and warning is found to be insufficient.

— Sir Robert Peel, "Principles of Law Enforcement"

For the English law on the use of force in crime prevention, see Self-defence in English law. The Australian position on the use of troops for civil policing is set out by Michael Head in Calling Out the Troops: Disturbing Trends and Unanswered Questions; compare "Use of Deadly Force by the South African Police Services Re-visited" by Malebo Keebine-Sibanda and Omphemetse Sibanda.

== History ==
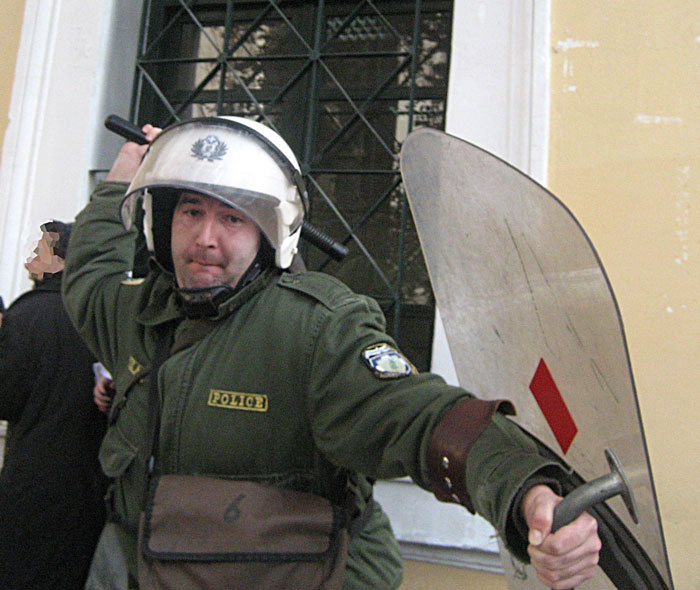
A baton used by riot police of Greece

Use of force dates back to the beginning of established law enforcement, with a fear that officers would abuse their power. Currently in society, this fear still exists and one of the ways to fix this problem, is to require police to wear body cameras, which should be turned on during all interactions with civilians.

== Use of force continuum ==
The use of force may be standardized by a Use of Force Continuum, which presents guidelines as to the degree of force appropriate in a given situation. One source identifies five very generalized steps, increasing from least use of force to greatest. This kind of continuum generally has many levels, and officers are instructed to respond with a level of force appropriate to the situation at hand, acknowledging that the officer may move from one part of the continuum to another in a matter of seconds.

== Officer attributes ==
=== Education ===
Studies have shown that law enforcement personnel with some college education (typically two-year degrees) use force much less often than those with little to no higher education. In events that the educated officers do use force, it is usually what is considered "reasonable" force. Despite these findings, very little – only 1% – of police forces within the United States have education requirements for those looking to join their forces. Some argue that police work deeply requires experience that can only be gained from actually working in the field.

=== Experience ===
It is argued that the skills for performing law enforcement tasks well cannot be produced from a classroom setting. These skills tend to be better gained through repeated exposure to law enforcement situations while in the line of work. The results as to whether or not the amount of experience an officer has contributes to the likelihood that they will use force differ among studies.

=== Other characteristics ===
It has not been strongly found that the race, class, gender, age etc. of an officer affects the likelihood that they will use force. Situational factors may come into play.

==== Split-second syndrome ====
Split-second syndrome is an example of how use of force can be situation-based. Well-meaning officers may resort to the use of force too quickly under situations where they must make a rapid decision.

=== Police dogs ===
A 2020 investigation coordinated by the Marshall Project found evidence of widespread deployment of police dogs in the U.S. as disproportionate force and disproportionately against people of color. A series of 13 linked reports, found more than 150 cases from 2015 to 2020 of K-9 officers improperly using dogs as weapons to catch, bite and injure people. The rate of police K-9 bites in Baton Rouge, Louisiana, a majority-Black city of 220,000 residents, averages more than double that of the next-ranked city, Indianapolis, and nearly one-third of the police dog bites are inflicted on teenage men, most of whom are Black. medical researchers found that police dog attacks are "more like shark attacks than nips from a family pet” due to the aggressive training police dogs undergo. Many people bitten were not violent and were not suspected of crimes. Police officers are often shielded from liability, and federal civil rights laws don’t typically cover bystanders who are bitten by mistake. Even when victims can bring cases, lawyers say they struggle because jurors tend to love police dogs.

== Departmental attributes ==
Policies on use of force can differ between departments. The type of policies established and whether or not they are enforced can affect an officer's likeliness to use force. If policies are established, but not enforced heavily by the department, the policies may not make a difference. For example, the Rodney King case was described as a problem with the departmental supervision not being clear on policies of (excessive) force. Training offered by the department can be a contributing factor, as well, though it has only been a recent addition to include information on when to use force, rather than how to use force.

One departmental level policy that is currently being studied and called for by many citizens and politicians is the use of body cameras by officers. In one study body cameras were shown to reduce the use of force by as much as 50%.

== Crime levels ==
At the micro level, violent crime levels in the neighborhood increase the likelihood of law enforcement use of force. In contrast, at the meso level, violent neighborhood crime does not have that much effect on use of force.

== By country ==
=== United States ===
==== U.S. case law ====
===== Graham v. Connor (1989) =====
On November 12, 1984, Graham, who was a diabetic, felt an insulin reaction coming on and rushed to the store with a friend to get some orange juice. When the store was too crowded, he and his friend went to another friend's house. In the midst of all this, he was being watched by Officer Connor, of the Charlotte City Police Department police department. While on their way to the friend's house, the officer stopped the two of them and called for backup. After several other officers arrived, one of them handcuffed Graham. Eventually, when Connor learned that nothing had happened in the convenience store, the officers drove Graham home and released him. Over the course of the encounter, Graham sustained a broken foot, cuts on his wrists, a bruised forehead and an injured shoulder. In the resulting case, Graham v. Connor (1989), the Supreme Court held that it was irrelevant whether Connor acted in good faith, because the use of force must be judged based on its objective reasonableness. In determining the "objective reasonableness" of force, the court set out a series of three factors: "the severity of the crime," "whether there is an immediate threat to the safety of officers or others," and "whether the suspect is actively resisting arrest or evading".

===== Tennessee v. Garner (1985) =====
On October 3, 1974, Officers Elton Hymon and Leslie Wright of the Memphis Police Department were called to respond to a possible burglary. When they arrived to the scene, a woman standing on the porch began to tell them that she heard glass breaking and that she believed the house next door was being broken into. Officer Hymon went to check, where he saw Edward Garner, who was fleeing the scene. As Garner was climbing over the gate, Hymon called out "police, halt", and when Garner failed to do so, Hymon fatally shot Garner in the back of the head, despite being "reasonably sure" that Garner was unarmed. The Supreme Court held, in Tennessee v. Garner, that deadly force may be used to prevent the escape of a fleeing felon only if the officer has probable cause to believe that the suspect poses a serious risk to the officer or to others.

===== Payne v. Pauley (2003) =====
Payne v. Pauley is a case in the Seventh Federal Circuit Court of Appeals, which held that the use of force must be both reasonable and actually necessary to avoid an excessive force complaint.

===== Nelson v. City of Davis (2004) =====
On April 16, 2004, what was supposed to be known as the "biggest party in history" took place at the annual UC Davis picnic. Due to the large number of participants at this party, people began to illegally park their cars. Sgt. John Wilson demanded that officers start to issue parking tickets to the illegally parked cars. Tickets were also issued to the underage drinkers. Wilson called the owner of the apartment complex because of the disturbances that were being caused; loud music and the sounds of bottles breaking. Wilson was consented by the complex apartment owner to have non-residents to leave the complex. Thirty or forty officers were rounded up with riot gear – including pepper ball guns – to try to disperse the crowd of 1,000 attendees. The officers gathered in front of the complex where 15 to 20 students, including Timothy C. Nelson, were attempting to leave, but no instructions were given by the police. Officers began to fire pepper-balls, one of which struck Nelson in the eye. He collapsed immediately and was taken to the hospital much later on, where he suffered multiple injuries including temporary blindness and a permanent loss of visual acuity. He endured multiple surgeries to try to repair the injury. Nelson lost his athletic scholarship due to his injury and was forced to withdraw from UC Davis. The officers were unable to find any criminal charges against Nelson. The Ninth Circuit held that the use of force was unreasonable and the officers were not entitled to qualified immunity.

===== Plumhoff v. Rickard (2014) =====
On July 18, 2014, a West Memphis police officer stopped Donald Rickard for a broken headlight. As the officer talked with Rickard he noticed that there was an indentation in the windshield and that Rickard was acting very erratic. The officer asked Rickard to step out of the vehicle. Rickard at that point fled the scene. A high speed chase ensued, which involved several other officers. Rickard lost control of his vehicle in a parking lot, and officers exited their vehicles to approach Rickard. Rickard again tried to flee, hitting several police cruisers and nearly hitting several officers. At this time officers opened fire on Rickard. The officers fired a total of 15 rounds which resulted in the death of both Rickard and his passenger. The Supreme Court ruled that the use of force was justified, because the objective reasonableness of the use of deadly force must be based on the situation in which it was used, and not on hindsight.

===== Kisela v. Hughes (2018) =====
Andrew Kisela, a Tucson police officer, shot Hughes less than a minute after arriving with other police officers to a report of a woman erratically hacking a tree with a knife. Hughes was in possession of a large kitchen knife, had taken steps towards her roommate, and had refused to drop the knife when repeatedly told to do so. After the shooting, the officers discovered that Hughes had a history of mental illness. All officers stated later that they believed Hughes to be a threat to the roommate. Hughes sued the officer claiming "excessive use of force" in violation of the 4th amendment. The Supreme Court ruled in favor of Officer Kisela, and stated that a reasonable officer is not required to foresee judicial decisions "that do not yet exist in instances where the requirements of the Fourth Amendment are far from obvious".

==== U.S. statistics ====
Of the 40 million people in the United States who had face to face contact with the police 1.4%, or 574,000, reported use of force or the threat of use of force being directed at them. About a quarter of the 574,000 incidents involved the police officer pointing the gun at the subject of the incident and 53.5% of the incidents saw the officer using physical force such as kicking, grabbing, and pushing. In addition, 13.7% of those that had force used against them or were threatened with the use of force submitted complaints to the offending officer's department. Of those that received use of force from a police officer or were threatened with use of force almost 75% reported that they believed it was excessive and unwarranted. This statistic was consistent across the Caucasian, African American, and Hispanic races.

A report by the Washington Post found that 385 Americans were fatally shot by law enforcement officers in the first five months of 2015, an average of more than two fatal shootings a day, which was more than twice the rate reported in official statistics. 221 of those killed were armed with guns, and 68 were armed with knives or other blades.

U.S. military personnel on guard duty are given a "use of force briefing" by the sergeant of the guard before being assigned to their post.

=== United Kingdom ===
In England and Wales the use of (reasonable) force is provided to police and any other person from Section 3 of the Criminal Law Act 1967, which states:

"A person may use such force as is reasonable in the circumstances in the prevention of crime, or in effecting or assisting in the lawful arrest of offenders or suspected offenders or of persons unlawfully at large".

Use of force may be considered lawful if it was, on the basis of the facts as the accused honestly believed them, necessary and reasonable.

(Further provision about when force is "reasonable" was made by section 76 of the Criminal Justice and Immigration Act 2008.)

=== Japan ===
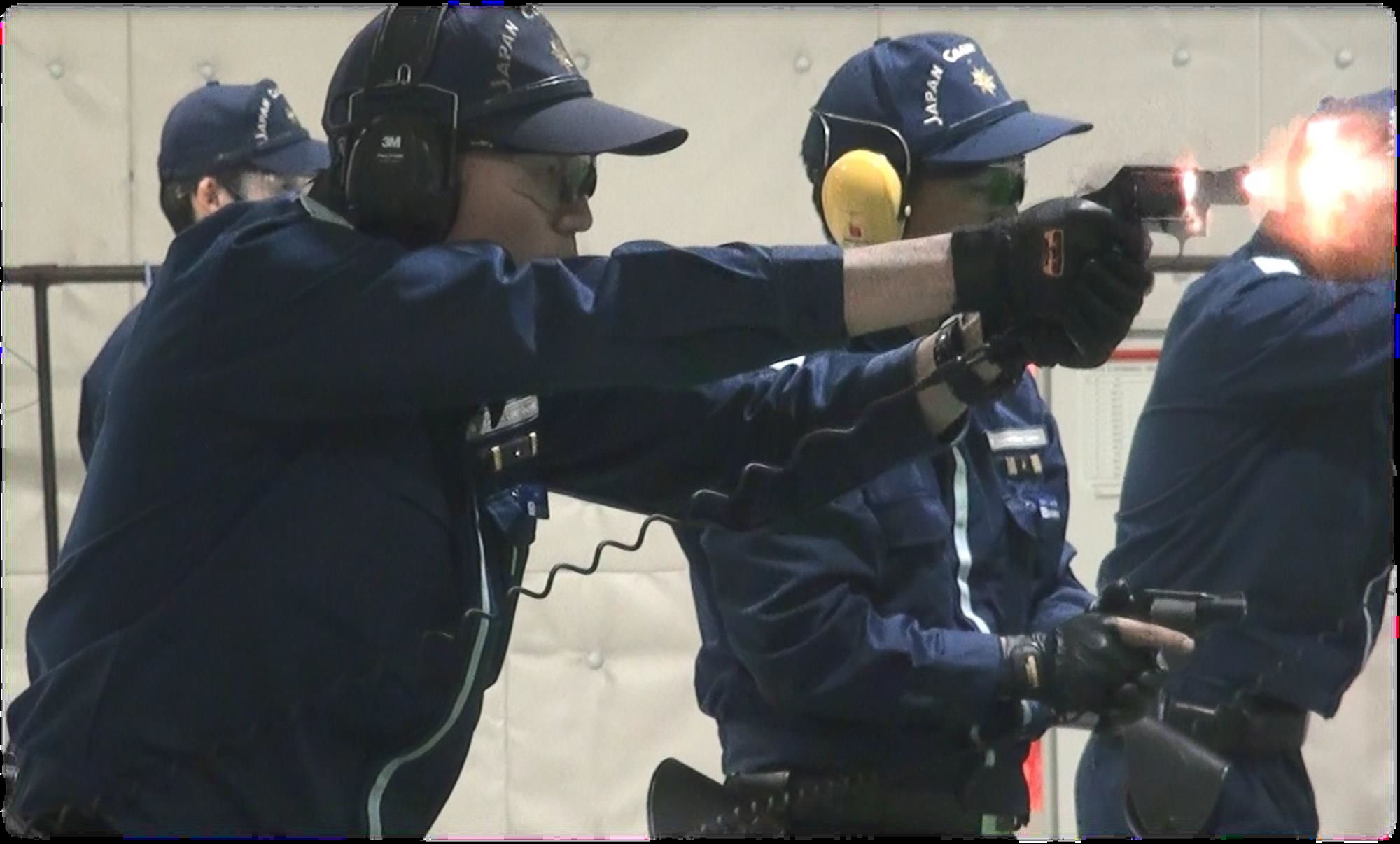
Japan Coast Guard officer firing handgun

In Japan, the use of weapons is the pinnacle of the intensity of the use of force by Japanese police officers. There is no clear-cut provision in the actual law regarding the degree to which the use of force is permissible as a means of arrest, except in the case of the use of weapons.

Under Article 7 of the Police Duties Execution Law, police officers may use weapons to apprehend criminals, prevent escape, protect themselves or others, or deter resistance to the execution of official duties. However, the use of weapons is limited to "the extent reasonably necessary in the circumstances," and, except in the case of self-defense or execution of an arrest warrant, may only be used to arrest or prevent the escape of a criminal for a serious violent crime or a criminal for whom an arrest warrant has been issued, or to deter resistance to the execution of official duties. The use of weapons is limited to the purpose of apprehending or preventing the escape of an offender who has been charged with a serious violent crime or for whom an arrest warrant has been issued, or to restraining a serious violent crime.

This requirement of "to the extent deemed reasonably necessary" clarifies the so-called principle of police proportionality, which is understood to apply to the use of tangible force in general. According to the "Guidelines for the Work and Activities of Police Officers Focusing on the Prevention of Injuries and Accidents" (issued by the Deputy Commissioner of the National Police Agency on May 10, 1962), depending on the ferocity and resistance of the other party, the possible means include "using a baton and arrest techniques," "drawing a gun," "holding a gun," "threatening to shoot," and "shooting at the other party. The attitude and manner in which they can be used are shown step by step. Although it is understood that a baton and cane do not constitute "weapons" as defined in the Police Duties Execution Law, there are precedents that have held that if they are used in a manner that kills or injures a person beyond their intended use, they are in effect equivalent to the use of weapons.

The following three types of crimes are defined by the National Public Safety Commission's Rules on the Use and Handling of Guns by Police Officers and Other Personnel (National Public Safety Commission Rule 7):

- Crimes that cause fear or anxiety in society by threatening to harm the life or body of an unspecified person or many people, or destroy important facilities or equipment: illegal use of explosives and arson of an existing building are listed as examples.
- Crimes that endanger the life or body of a person: murder, assault, etc.
- Crimes that are likely to cause harm to a person's life or body and are committed in a manner that is extremely awe-inspiring, such as by carrying a deadly weapon.

When special judicial police personnel such as Japan Coast Guard officers, narcotics officers, or self-defense force soldiers on public security missions use weapons, the Police Duties Execution Law will be applied mutatis mutandis based on the respective laws. In addition, in cases where a vessel is targeted, no matter where the target is, there is a possibility of harm to a person, it is difficult to shoot reliably, and it is difficult for patrol vessels to approach a suspect vessel inadvertently, etc. Taking into consideration the special characteristics of the maritime environment, the Japan Coast Guard Law provides that even if it does not constitute a crime, it is possible to take measures against dangerous acts at sea, such as The Japan Coast Guard Act allows the use of weapons for measures against dangerous acts at sea and for on-site inspections to confirm the identity of vessels, etc., even if they do not fall under the requirements for constituting a crime. These provisions also apply to JSDF soldiers in units ordered to conduct maritime security operations and anti-piracy operations.

== See also ==
- Excessive force
- Use of force continuum
- Use of force doctrine in Missouri
- Distinction (law)
- Monopoly on violence
- Peelian principles
- Police: Weapons
  - Riot control weapons, used by police to control riots
- Use of force in international law
