= Use of force continuum =

Guidelines for police conduct

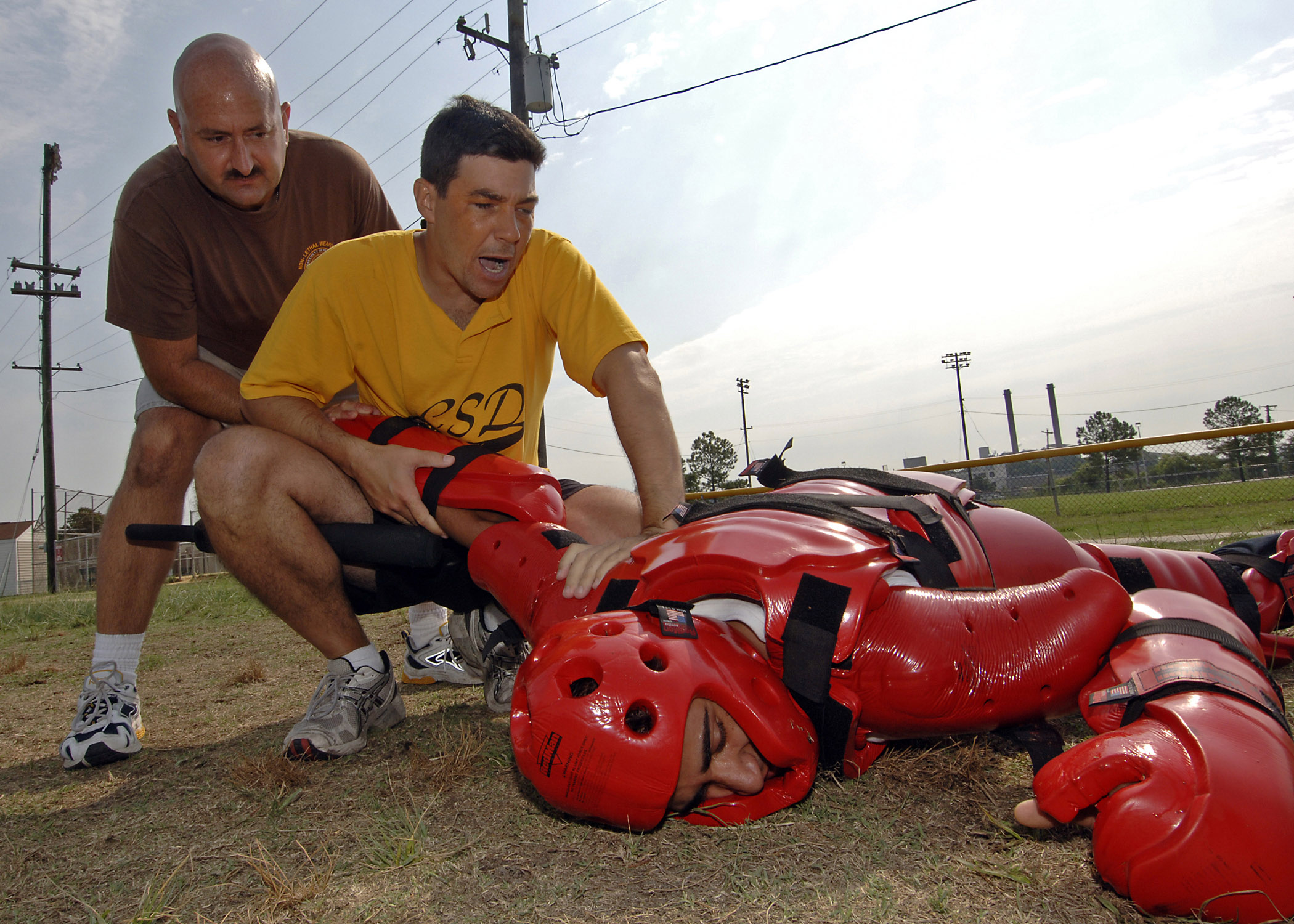
Operations Specialist 1st Class Dennis Marholz apprehends a mock suspect after being hit with pepper spray while Aviation Electronic Technician 1st Class Pete Ingram keeps close watch during a pepper spray testing evaluation that marked the final stage in a three-week series of training involving non-lethal weapons and the use of force continuum.

A use of force continuum is a standard that provides law enforcement officers and civilians with guidelines as to how much force may be used against a resisting or compliant subject in a given situation. In some ways, it is similar to the U.S. military's escalation of force (EOF). The purpose of these models is to clarify, both for law enforcement officers and civilians, the complex subject of use of force. They are often central parts of law enforcement agencies' use of force policies. Various criminal justice agencies have developed different models of the continuum, and there is no universal or standard model. Generally, each different agency will have their own use of force policy. Some agencies may separate some of the hand-to-hand based use of force. For example, take-downs and pressure point techniques may be one step before actual strikes and kicks. Also, for some agencies the use of aerosol pepper spray and electronic control devices (TASER) may fall into the same category as take-downs, or the actual strikes.

The first examples of a use of force continuum were developed in the 1980s and early 1990s. Early models were depicted in various formats, including graphs, semicircular "gauges", and linear progressions. Most often the models are presented in "stair step" fashion, with each level of force matched by a corresponding level of subject resistance, although it is generally noted that an officer need not progress through each level before reaching the final level of force. These progressions rest on the premise that officers should escalate and de-escalate their level of force in response to the subject's actions.

Although the use of force continuum is used primarily as a training tool for law enforcement officers, it is also valuable with civilians, such as in criminal trials or hearings by police review boards. In particular, a graphical representation of a use of force continuum is useful to a jury when deciding whether an officer's use of force was reasonable.

== Example model ==
While the specific progression of force varies considerably (especially the wide gap between empty hand control and deadly force) among different agencies and jurisdictions, one example of a general use of force continuum model cited in a U.S. government publication on use of force is shown below.

1. Officer presence – the professionalism, uniform, and utility belt of the law enforcement officer and the marked vessel or vehicle the officer arrives in. The visual presence of authority is normally enough for a subject to comply with an officer's lawful demands. Depending on the totality of the circumstances, a call/situation may require additional officers or on scene officers may request assistance in order to gain better control of the situation and ensure a safer environment for all involved. It also will depend on the circumstances of the situation. For example, depending on how many people are at the scene with the officer, a larger presence may be required. However, if 10 officers arrive at a scene with only a single suspect, the public may perceive the situation as an excessive use of officer presence within the use of force continuum.
2. Verbal commands/cooperative controls – clear and understandable verbal direction by an officer aimed at the subject. In some cases, it is necessary for the officer to include a consequence to the verbal direction so that the subject understands what will happen if the subject refuses to comply with the officer’s direction. The verbal command and the consequence must be legal and not considered excessive according to the continuum. For example, an officer could not order a disabled person in a wheel chair to stand up or be sprayed by Oleoresin Capsicum (OC) Pepper Spray.
3. Soft Control, PPCT – Pressure Point Control Tactics, Control Tactics, techniques – a level of force that has a low probability of causing soft connective tissue damage or bone fractures. This would include joint manipulation techniques, applying pressure to pressure points and normal application of hand-cuffs.
4. Hard control techniques/aggressive response techniques – the amount of force that has a probability of causing soft connective tissue damage or bone fractures or irritation of the skin, eyes, and mucous membranes. This would include kicks, punches, stuns and use of aerosol sprays such as oleoresin capsicum (OC) pepper spray. Some models split these techniques between empty-hand, soft control and intermediate weapon techniques but only include 5 levels of the continuum.
5. Intermediate weapons – an amount of force that would have a high probability of causing soft connective tissue damage or bone fractures (such as expandable baton, baton, pepper spray, Taser, beanbag rounds, rubber fin stabilized ammunition, Mace (spray), police dogs, and others) Intermediate weapon techniques are designed to make impact with muscles, arms and legs, and intentionally using an intermediate weapon on the head, neck, groin, knee caps, or spine would be classified as deadly or lethal force.
6. Lethal force/deadly force – a force with a high probability of causing death or serious bodily injury. Serious bodily injury includes unconsciousness, protracted or obvious physical disfigurement, or protracted loss of or impairment to the function of a bodily member, organ, or the mental faculty. A firearm is the most widely recognized lethal or deadly force weapon; however, an automobile or weapon of opportunity could also be defined as a deadly force utility.

The U.S. Navy teaches a six-step model: Professional presence, Verbal commands, Soft controls, Hard controls, Intermediate Weapons, and Deadly force. Hard controls include the use of tools such as handcuffs, while soft controls equate to empty hand above, describing techniques where the officer may engage a resisting detainee. When escalating, voluntary submission to cuffs is a viable way to prevent the need for empty hand submission techniques which place the officer and the detainee at physical risk. When de-escalating, hard controls (such as cuffs and isolation in the rear seat of a cruiser) give officers a reasonable and achievable goal after altercation with a detainee during which higher levels of force may have been required.

== Subject classifications ==
In all use of force continuum models, the actions of the subject is classified in order for the officer to quickly determine what level of force is authorized and may be necessary to apprehend or compel compliance from the individual. Listed below are examples of how subjects are classified.

- Passive compliant – a person who recognizes the authority of the officers presence and follows the verbal commands of the officer.
- Passive resistor – a person who refuses to follow the verbal commands of the officer but does not resist attempts by officers to take positive physical control over them.
- Active resistor – a person who does not follow verbal commands, resists attempts by the officer to take positive physical control over them, but does not try to inflict harm on the officer.
- Active aggressor – a person who does not follow verbal commands, resists attempts by the officer to take positive physical control over them and attempts to cause harm to the officer or others.

Generally, the passive subjects and active resistors fall under levels 1–3 of the use of force continuum, while active aggressors fall under levels 4–6. The officers are trained to apply the proper measure of force within the continuum based on the actions and classification of the subject.

== Reasonableness standard ==
The United States Supreme Court, in the case of Graham v. Connor, (1989) ruled that excessive use of force claims must be evaluated under the "objectively reasonable" standard of the Fourth Amendment. Therefore, the "reasonableness" factor of a use of force incident must be judged from the perspective of a reasonable officer on the scene, and judged with the understanding that police officers are often forced to make split-second decisions about the amount of force necessary in a particular situation.

Broadly speaking, the use of force by an officer becomes necessary and is permitted under specific circumstances, such as in self-defense or in defense of another individual or group. However, there is no all encompassing consensus about when an officer would always need to use force, nor is there any agreed upon method that can efficiently measure or predict specific types of force actions that one would deem reasonable before the time comes.

The International Association of Chiefs of Police, has described use of force as the "amount of effort required by police to compel compliance by an unwilling subject".

== When force is observed ==
Garner and Maxwell (1996) found that when force was necessary, in 80 percent of the encounters, police opted to use weaponless force such as grabbing or shoving. Alpert and Dunham (1999) show that police use of force is reactionary, initiated by suspect resisting arrest. Force is more likely to be employed if suspect is disrespectful, intoxicated, and/or wielding a weapon. Research has also found that special division officers are more likely to use deadly force on suspects.

Studies examining gender influences on the use of force are still inconclusive. Some findings suggest that male suspects are more likely to have force used against them, whereas others show insignificant differences. However, research examining male-female patrol teams shows that these pairings are less likely to use force compared to male-male pairings. Conclusions suggest that female officers may be more effective at defusing tense situations.

== See also ==
- Friedrich Glasl's model of conflict escalation
- Pain compliance
- Peelian principles
- Police brutality
- Reasonable force
