= Graham v. Connor =

- Supreme Court of the United States

Argued February 21, 1989 Decided May 15, 1989
- Full case name: Dethorne Graham v. Connor, et al.
- Citations: 490 U.S. 386 (more) 109 S. Ct. 1865; 104 L. Ed. 2d 443; 1989 U.S. LEXIS 2467; 57 U.S.L.W. 4513
- Argument: Oral argument

Holding
- An objective reasonableness standard should apply to a free citizen's claim that law enforcement officials used excessive force in the course of making an arrest, investigatory stop, or other "seizure" of their person.

Court membership
- Chief Justice William Rehnquist Associate Justices William J. Brennan Jr. · Byron White; Thurgood Marshall · Harry Blackmun; John P. Stevens · Sandra Day O'Connor; Antonin Scalia · Anthony Kennedy

Case opinions
- Majority: Rehnquist, joined by White, Stevens, O'Connor, Scalia, Kennedy
- Concurrence: Blackmun, joined by Brennan, Marshall

Laws applied
- U.S. Const. amend. IV

Graham v. Connor, 490 U.S. 386 (1989), was a United States Supreme Court case in which the court determined that an objective reasonableness standard should apply to a civilian's claim that law enforcement officials used excessive force in the course of making an arrest, investigatory stop, or other "seizure" of their person.

Chief Justice Rehnquist once again rejected the idea of §1983 as "a source of substantive rights." The court ruled that excessive force claims in the context of investigatory stops or arrests should be evaluated under the Fourth Amendment's objective standard rather than a substantive due process standard.

The outcome of the case was the creation of an "objective reasonableness test" in examining an officer's actions. That test, over time via case law, would evolve to a standard that could be summed up as "given the facts known at the time, would a similarly trained and experienced officer respond in a similar fashion."

== Background ==
Dethorne Graham, a resident of Charlotte, North Carolina, asked a friend to drive him to a convenience store to buy orange juice to counteract an insulin reaction that Graham was experiencing. Graham entered the store but quickly left because the line was too long. He returned to his friend's vehicle, and they then drove away from the store. Connor, a nearby police officer, observed Graham's behavior and became suspicious. Connor then pulled them over for an investigative stop.

Although Graham's friend told police that Graham was simply suffering from a "sugar reaction," the officer ordered Graham to wait while he found out what, if anything, had happened at the convenience store. When Connor returned to his patrol car to call for backup assistance, Graham got out of the car, ran around it twice, and finally sat down on the curb, where he passed out briefly.

In the ensuing confusion, a number of other Charlotte police officers arrived on the scene in response to Connor's request for backup. One of the officers rolled Graham over on the sidewalk, cuffed his hands tightly behind his back, and ignored Graham's friend's pleas to get him some sugar. Eventually, the store confirmed that Graham had not done anything wrong, and he was released.

During the police encounter, Graham suffered a broken foot, cuts on his wrists, a bruised forehead, and an injured shoulder. He filed a federal lawsuit against Officer Connor and other officers and alleged that the officers' use of force during the investigative stop had been excessive and violated Graham's civil rights.

=== Prior case law ===
The Court of Appeals for the Second Circuit, in an opinion written by Judge Henry Friendly, found that the "application of undue force by law enforcement officers deprives a suspect of liberty without due process of law". This followed on the Supreme Court decision Rochin v. California. Judge Friendly's four-part test was applied to most excessive force claims, with most federal courts grounding the right to be free from excessive force in basic principles.

== Decision ==
The Supreme Court held that determining the "reasonableness" of a seizure "requires a careful balancing of the nature and quality of the intrusion on the individual's Fourth Amendment interests against the countervailing governmental interests at stake". It acknowledged, "Our Fourth Amendment jurisprudence has long recognized that the right to make an arrest or investigatory stop necessarily carries with it the right to use some degree of physical coercion or threat thereof to effect it".

The court said the reasonableness determination "is not capable of precise definition or mechanical application". It then noted, however, the test's "proper application requires careful attention to the facts and circumstances of each particular case."

The court rejected the notion that the judiciary could use the Due Process Clause, instead of the Fourth Amendment, in analyzing an excessive force claim: "Because the Fourth Amendment provides an explicit textual source of constitutional protection against this sort of physically intrusive governmental conduct, that Amendment, not the more generalized notion of 'substantive due process', must be the guide for analyzing these claims".

The court then explained, "As in other Fourth Amendment contexts... the "reasonableness" inquiry in an excessive force case is an objective one: the question is whether the officers' actions are 'objectively reasonable' in light of the facts and circumstances confronting them, without regard to their underlying intent or motivation". The court also cautioned, "The "reasonableness" of a particular use of force must be judged from the perspective of a reasonable officer on the scene, rather than with the 20/20 vision of hindsight". The court further explained, "the 'reasonableness' of a particular use of force must be judged from the perspective of a reasonable officer on the scene, and its calculus must embody an allowance for the fact that police officers are often forced to make split-second decisions about the amount of force necessary in a particular situation".

The court then outlined a non-exhaustive list of factors to determine when an officer's use of force is objectively reasonable: "the severity of the crime at issue," "whether the suspect poses an immediate threat to the safety of the officers or others," and "whether he is actively resisting arrest or attempting to evade arrest by flight".

Having established the proper framework for excessive force claims, the court explained that the Fourth Circuit Court of Appeals had applied a test that focused on an officer's subjective motivations, rather than on whether he had used an objectively unreasonable amount of force. The Supreme Court then reversed the Court of Appeals' judgement and remanded the case for reconsideration that used the proper Fourth Amendment standard.

== Impact ==
Many high-profile cases of alleged use of excessive force by a law enforcement officer have been decided based on the framework set out by Graham v. Connor, including those in which a civilian was killed by an officer: shooting of Michael Brown, shooting of Jonathan Ferrell, shooting of John Crawford III, shooting of Samuel DuBose, shooting of Jamar Clark, shooting of Keith Lamont Scott, shooting of Terence Crutcher, shooting of Alton Sterling, shooting of Philando Castile. In most of those cases, the officer's actions were deemed to pass the reasonableness test. Graham v. Connor was also repeatedly cited by both the prosecution and defense in State v. Chauvin regarding the murder of George Floyd, including by University of South Carolina professor Seth Stoughton, who compiled a 100-page report on the case as a prosecution expert.

Police industry publications praise the precedent set by Graham v. Connor for enforcing police officers' rights to perform their duties without suffering injury and recognizing the dangers inherent to their work. Critics view the framework that it created as unjust based on the large number of high-profile acquittals that it has allowed by not permitting hindsight knowledge to be considered in a case and allowing for racial biases to weigh on the verdict.

== See also ==
- List of United States Supreme Court cases, volume 490
- Tennessee v. Garner
- Mullenix v. Luna
- Davis v. City of Las Vegas
