= Killing of John Crawford III =

2014 killing by Beavercreek, Ohio police officer Sean Williams

- A surveillance screenshot of Crawford shot by the police
- Date: August 5, 2014
- Time: c. 8:27 p.m.
- Location: Beavercreek, Ohio, U.S.
- Type: Homicide by shooting, police killing
- Participants: Ronald Ritchie (911 caller); Sean Williams (shooter); David Darkow (accompanying officer)
- Deaths: John Crawford (shot and killed); Angela Williams (died from heart attack)
- Charges: None
- Litigation: Wrongful death lawsuit settled for $1.7 million

John Crawford III
- Photo of John Crawford III
- Born: July 29, 1992; Cincinnati, Ohio, US
- Died: August 5, 2014 (aged 22); Beavercreek, Ohio, US
- Cause of death: Homicide by shooting, police killing

On August 5, 2014, John Crawford III, a 22-year-old African-American man, was shot and killed by a police officer in a Walmart store in Beavercreek, Ohio, near Dayton, while he was holding a BB gun that was for sale in the store. The shooting was captured on surveillance video and led to protests from groups including the NAACP and the Black Lives Matter movement.

A grand jury declined to indict the two officers involved on criminal charges. The City of Beavercreek eventually settled civil claims for wrongful death brought by Crawford's estate and family.

== Killing ==
Crawford picked up an un-packaged BB/pellet air rifle inside the store's sporting goods section and continued shopping in the store. Another customer, Ronald Ritchie, called 9-1-1 claiming that Crawford had been pointing the gun at fellow customers. Security camera footage showed that Crawford was talking on his cellphone and holding the BB gun as he shopped, but at no point did he aim the BB gun at anyone. After the security camera footage was released, Ritchie recanted his statement that led to the fatal shooting and stated, "At no point did he shoulder the rifle and point it at somebody", while maintaining that Crawford was "waving it around".

Two officers of the Beavercreek Police arrived at the Walmart shortly after their dispatcher informed them of a "subject with a gun" in the pet supplies area of the store. Crawford was later pronounced dead at Dayton's Miami Valley Hospital.

A second person, Angela Williams, died after suffering a heart attack while fleeing from the shooting.

=== Police account ===
According to initial accounts from Officer Williams and the other officer involved, David Darkow, Crawford did not respond to verbal commands to drop the BB gun and lie on the ground, and eventually began to move as if trying to escape. Believing the BB gun was a real firearm, one of the officers fired two shots into Crawford's torso and arm. Crawford died of his injuries shortly afterwards.

=== Store video ===
The shooting was captured by the store's security video camera. Crawford was talking on his cell phone while holding the BB/Pellet air rifle when he was shot to death by Williams. The video shows the officers fired almost immediately after entering the store and sighting Crawford holding the BB gun. From the video, it is unclear whether officers gave verbal commands, and whether Crawford was shot before or after he reacted to the officers.

== Aftermath ==
The Guardian revealed in December that immediately after the shooting, detective Rodney Curd aggressively questioned Crawford's girlfriend, Tasha Thomas, threatening her with jail time. The interrogation caused her to sob uncontrollably, with hostile questions suggesting she was drunk or on drugs when she stated that Crawford did not enter the store with a gun. She was not yet aware of Crawford's death at the time of the interrogation. Thomas died in a car crash in Dayton several months later on January 1, 2015.

Following the shooting, a grand jury decided not to indict any of the officers involved on charges of either murder, reckless homicide, or negligent homicide. The U.S. Department of Justice (DOJ) conducted its own investigation. Sean Williams, the officer who shot Crawford, was removed from normal duties until the federal investigation was complete. In 2017, the DOJ announced that it declined to seek federal charges against the officer, who returned to full duty soon after.

The 2017 DOJ report stated: "To establish willfulness, federal authorities would be required to show that the officer acted with the deliberate and specific intent to do something the law forbids. This is one of the highest standards of intent imposed by law. Mistake, misperception, negligence, necessity, or poor judgment are not sufficient to establish a federal criminal civil rights violation... ...To establish that Officer Williams acted willfully, the government would be required both to disprove his stated reason for the shooting – that he was in fear of death or serious bodily injury – and to affirmatively establish that Officer Williams instead acted with the specific intent to violate Mr. Crawford’s rights. The evidence here simply cannot satisfy those burdens. Accordingly, the review into this incident has been closed without prosecution."

Crawford's mother believes that the surveillance tape shows the police lied in their account of events, and has spoken out against the killing at a "Justice for All" march. The family filed lawsuits for negligence and wrongful death against Walmart, the city of Beavercreek, and the police officers involved. In 2020, the city of Beavercreek and the family settled their suit for $1.7 million.

Ohio State Representative Alicia Reece proposed a "John Crawford's Law", which would change the way toy guns look to prevent similar tragedies.

Ohio is an "open carry" state, in which the open carrying of firearms is legal with or without a license, which prompted discussion of gun rights and race.

== Media reaction ==
The incident received local and international coverage, in part due to the time of its occurrence; the then-recent police shooting of Michael Brown in Ferguson, Missouri and the subsequent unrest there had attracted public attention, as did the death of Eric Garner in Staten Island, New York, and the shooting of Tamir Rice in Cleveland.

== See also ==
- List of unarmed African Americans killed by law enforcement officers in the United States
- Entertech shooting deaths
- Shooting of Emantic Fitzgerald Bradford Jr.
