= Tennessee v. Garner =

- Supreme Court of the United States

Argued October 30, 1984 Decided March 27, 1985
- Full case name: Tennessee v. Edward Garner, et al., Memphis Police Department, et al. v. Edward Garner, et al.
- Citations: 471 U.S. 1 (more) 105 S. Ct. 1694; 85 L. Ed. 2d 1; 1985 U.S. LEXIS 195; 53 U.S.L.W. 4410
- Argument: Oral argument

Case history
- Prior: Garner v. Memphis Police Dep't, 710 F.2d 240 (6th Cir. 1983); cert. granted, 465 U.S. 1098 (1984).

Holding
- Law enforcement officers pursuing an unarmed suspect may use deadly force to prevent escape only if the officer has probable cause to believe that the suspect poses a significant threat of death or serious physical injury to the officer or others.

Court membership
- Chief Justice Warren E. Burger Associate Justices William J. Brennan Jr. · Byron White; Thurgood Marshall · Harry Blackmun; Lewis F. Powell Jr. · William Rehnquist; John P. Stevens · Sandra Day O'Connor

Case opinions
- Majority: White, joined by Brennan, Marshall, Blackmun, Powell, Stevens
- Dissent: O'Connor, joined by Burger, Rehnquist

Laws applied
- U.S. Const. amend. IV

Tennessee v. Garner, 471 U.S. 1 (1985), is a civil case in which the Supreme Court of the United States held that, under the Fourth Amendment, when a law enforcement officer is pursuing a fleeing suspect, the officer may not use deadly force to prevent escape unless "the officer has probable cause to believe that the suspect poses a significant threat of death or serious physical injury to the officer or others."

It was found that the use of deadly force to prevent escape is an unreasonable seizure under the Fourth Amendment, in the absence of probable cause that the fleeing suspect posed a physical danger. Legal scholars have expressed support for this decision stating that the decision had "a strong effect on police behavior" and specifically that it can "influence police use of deadly force."

== Background ==
At about 10:45 p.m. on October 3, 1974, Memphis police officers Leslie Wright and Elton Hymon were dispatched to answer a burglary call. Officer Hymon went behind the house as his partner radioed back to the station. Hymon witnessed someone running across the yard. The fleeing suspect, 15 year old Edward Garner, stopped at a 6 ft 0 in (1.83 m) chain-link fence. Using his flashlight, Hymon could see Garner's face and hands, and was "reasonably sure" that Garner was unarmed.

After Hymon called out "police, halt", Garner began to climb the fence. Believing that Garner would certainly flee if he made it over the fence, Hymon shot him. The bullet struck Garner in the back of the head, and he died shortly after an ambulance took him to a nearby hospital. Ten dollars and a purse taken from the burglarized house were found on his person.

Hymon acted according to a Tennessee state statute and official Memphis Police Department policy authorizing deadly force against a fleeing suspect. The statute provided that "if, after notice of the intention to arrest the defendant, he either flee or forcibly resist, the officer may use all the necessary means to effect the arrest."

Garner's father, Cleamtee Garner, then brought suit in the United States District Court for the Western District of Tennessee under the Civil Rights Act of 1871, 42 U.S.C. § 1983, naming the City of Memphis, its mayor, the Memphis Police Department, its director, and Officer Hymon as defendants. The District Court found that Hymon's actions were authorized by the statute. On appeal, the United States Court of Appeals for the Sixth Circuit remanded for reconsideration of municipal liability under Monell v. New York City Dept. of Social Services. The district court found the statute and Hymon's actions were constitutional. The Court of Appeals reversed: if the killing of a fleeing suspect is a "seizure" for the purposes of the Fourth Amendment, it is only constitutional when it is reasonable. The Court of Appeals then found that based on the facts in this case, the Tennessee statute failed to properly limit the use of deadly force by reference to the seriousness of the felony.

== Opinion of the Court ==
Justice White wrote for the majority, first agreeing with the Sixth Circuit's determination that apprehension by use of deadly force is a seizure, then framing the legal issue as whether the totality of the circumstances justified the seizure. In order to determine the constitutionality of a seizure, White reasoned, the court must weigh the nature of the intrusion of the suspect's Fourth Amendment rights against the government interests which justified the intrusion.

The use of deadly force against a subject is the most intrusive type of seizure possible: "The suspect's fundamental interest in his own life need not be elaborated upon." White held that the state failed to present evidence that its interest in shooting unarmed fleeing suspects outweighs the suspect's interest in his own survival, and society's interest in a judicial determination of guilt and punishment.

Tennessee argued that the use of deadly force against a fleeing felon must be reasonable, because it was so at the time of the adoption of the Fourth Amendment, and it was perfectly legitimate to use "whatever force was necessary to effect the arrest of a fleeing felon" at common law. The court disagreed.

In modern American law, the death penalty is reserved for the most heinous crimes. There are felony crimes today that did not exist at common law, or were not considered felonies. Furthermore, the common law rule developed at a time before modern firearms, and making arrests was even more dangerous than it is today. The context in which the common law rule evolved was no longer valid and it would be a "mistaken literalism" to rely on such a rule. White further noted that many jurisdictions had already done away with it, and that current research has shown that the use of deadly force contributes little to the deterrence of crime or the protection of the public.

On the basis of the facts found by the district court, Hymon had no reason to believe that Garner was armed or dangerous. The Court ordered the case remanded for a determination on the liability of the other defendants.

=== Dissent ===
In her dissent, Justice O'Connor highlighted the fact that police officers must often make swift, spur-of-the-moment decisions while on patrol, and argued that the robbery, and assault that happen in the home are related to the already serious crime of burglary. The Tennessee statute represents the state legislature's judgment that such crimes may require the use of deadly force in order to protect the public against those who commit such crimes. She also disagreed that a suspect's interest in his own life necessarily allows the right to flee from the scene of a crime when pursued, thereby escaping due process, although the majority did not find nor articulate any "right to flee".

== Limitations of impact ==
Garner brought his suit under 42 U.S.C. § 1983, which extends to citizens' protection from violations of their civil rights by "persons", including persons acting in their official capacity as officers of the states. Accordingly, the court's holding under this section sets a standard that state police departments must comply with. In practice, however, the Garner case has had less impact on state-level police practices than was originally anticipated. This is because Garner, and a subsequent case, Graham v. Connor, established that the reasonableness of an officer's use of force, whether against a fleeing suspect or otherwise, is to be determined from the perspective of the officer under the circumstances that were apparent to them at the time. As the Graham court made clear, this deferential standard prevents most second-guessing of an officer's judgment about use of force. It may be that Garner's legacy is not so much one of changing the use of deadly force by police as it is of eliding use of force policies and practices by shifting them from the statutory to the customary.

Tennenbaum shows a significant reduction (16%) in the number of police homicides committed before, and after the decision. This reduction was more significant in states which declared their laws regarding police use of deadly force to be unconstitutional after the Garner decision. The evidence suggests that the reduction is due not only to a reduction in shooting fleeing felons, but also to a general reduction in police shooting. These empirical findings prove that, despite suspicion about the ability of the Supreme Court to change police discretion, its rulings can have a significant effect on police behavior.

== See also ==
- Graham v. Connor (1989)
- White v. Pauly (2017)
- Use of force continuum
