= Police =

Law-enforcement body

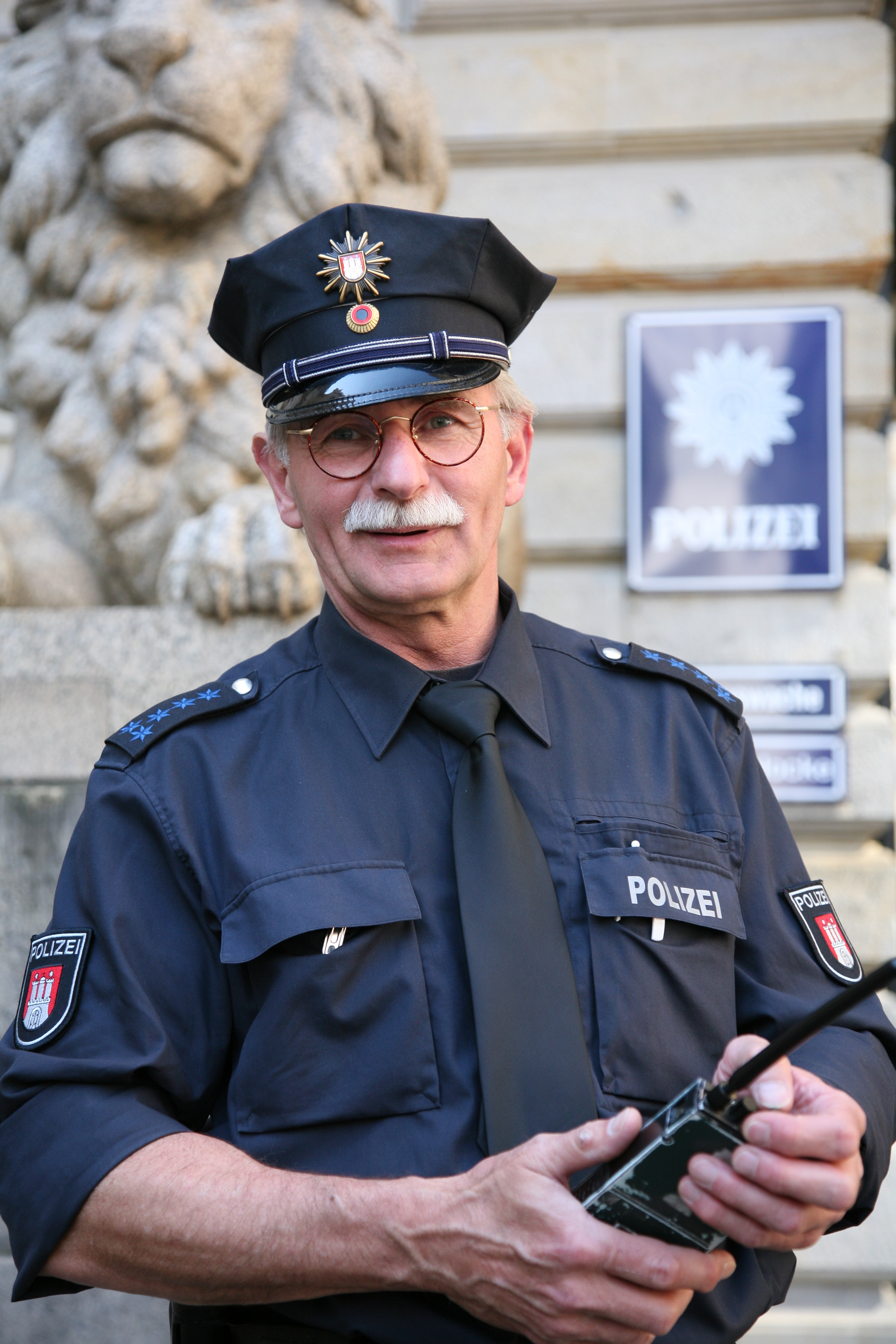
German State Police officer in Hamburg, with the rank of Polizeihauptmeister mit Zulage ("police chief master with upgraded pay")

The police are a constituted body of people empowered by a state with the aim of enforcing the law and protecting the public order as well as the public itself. This commonly includes ensuring the safety, health, and possessions of citizens, and to prevent crime and civil disorder. Their lawful powers encompass arrest and the use of force legitimized by the state's monopoly on violence. The term is most commonly associated with the police forces of a sovereign state that are authorized to exercise the police power of that state within a defined legal or territorial area of responsibility. Police forces are often defined as being separate from the military and other organizations involved in the defense of the state against foreign aggressors; however, gendarmerie are military units charged with civil policing. Police forces are usually public sector services, funded through taxes.

Law enforcement is only part of policing activity. Policing has included an array of activities in different situations, but the predominant ones are concerned with the preservation of order. In some societies, in the late 18th and early 19th centuries, these developed within the context of maintaining the class system and the protection of private property. Police forces have become ubiquitous in complex modern societies. However, their role can sometimes be controversial, as they may be involved to varying degrees in corruption, brutality, and the enforcement of authoritarian rule.

A police force may also be referred to as a police department, police service, constabulary, gendarmerie, crime prevention, protective services, law enforcement agency, civil guard, or civic guard. Members may be referred to as police officers, troopers, sheriffs, constables, rangers, peace officers or civic/civil guards. Ireland differs from other English-speaking countries by using the Irish language terms Garda (singular) and Gardaí (plural), for both the national police force and its members. The word police is the most universal and similar terms can be seen in many non-English speaking countries.

Numerous slang terms exist for the police. Many slang terms for police officers are decades or centuries old with lost etymologies. One of the oldest, cop, has largely lost its slang connotations and become a common colloquial term used both by the public and police officers to refer to their profession.

== Etymology ==
First attested in English in the early 15th century, originally in a range of senses encompassing '(public) policy; state; public order', the word police comes from Middle French police ('public order, administration, government'), in turn from Latin politia, which is the romanization of the Ancient Greek πολιτεία (politeia) 'citizenship, administration, civil polity'. This is derived from πόλις (polis) 'city'.

== Development of theory ==
Michel Foucault wrote that the contemporary concept of police as a paid and funded functionary of the state was developed by German and French legal scholars and practitioners in public administration and statistics in the 17th and early 18th centuries, most notably with Nicolas Delamare's Traité de la Police ("Treatise on the Police"), first published in 1705. The German Polizeiwissenschaft (Science of Police) first theorized by Philipp von Hörnigk, a 17th-century Austrian political economist and civil servant, and much more famously by Johann Heinrich Gottlob Justi, who produced an important theoretical work known as Cameral science on the formulation of police. Foucault cites Magdalene Humpert author of Bibliographie der Kameralwissenschaften (1937) in which the author makes note of a substantial bibliography was produced of over 4,000 pieces of the practice of Polizeiwissenschaft. However, this may be a mistranslation of Foucault's own work since the actual source of Magdalene Humpert states over 14,000 items were produced from the 16th century dates ranging from 1520 to 1850.

As conceptualized by the Polizeiwissenschaft, according to Foucault the police had an administrative, economic and social duty ("procuring abundance"). It was in charge of demographic concerns and needed to be incorporated within the western political philosophy system of raison d'état and therefore giving the superficial appearance of empowering the population (and unwittingly supervising the population), which, according to mercantilist theory, was to be the main strength of the state. Thus, its functions largely overreached simple law enforcement activities and included public health concerns, urban planning (which was important because of the miasma theory of disease; thus, cemeteries were moved out of town, etc.), and surveillance of prices.

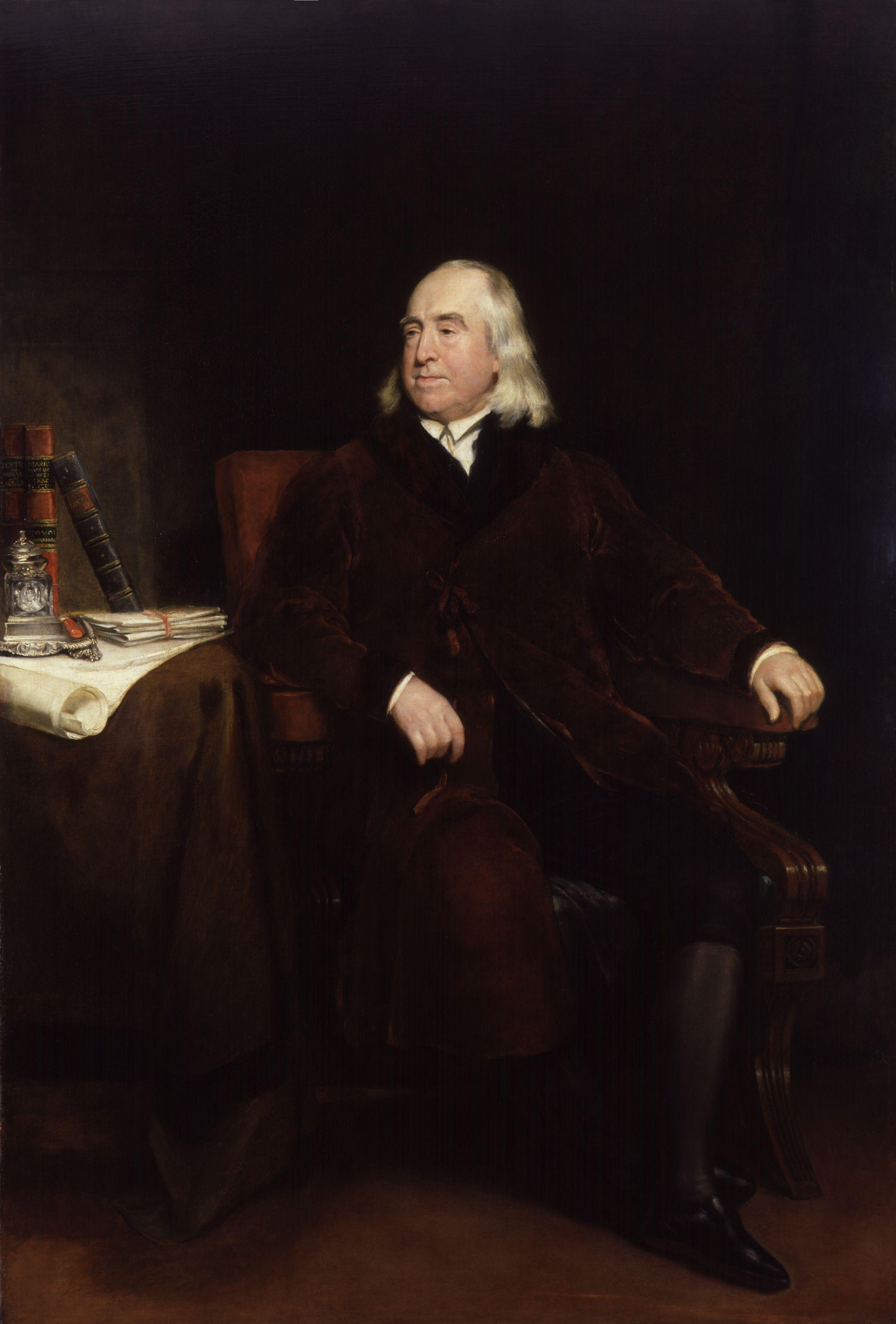
Jeremy Bentham, philosopher who advocated for the establishment of preventive police forces and influenced the reforms of Sir Robert Peel

The concept of preventive policing, or policing to deter crime from taking place, gained influence in the late 18th century. Police Magistrate John Fielding, head of the Bow Street Runners, argued that "...it is much better to prevent even one man from being a rogue than apprehending and bringing forty to justice."

The Utilitarian philosopher, Jeremy Bentham, promoted the views of Italian Marquis Cesare Beccaria, and disseminated a translated version of "Essay on Crime in Punishment". Bentham espoused the guiding principle of "the greatest good for the greatest number":

It is better to prevent crimes than to punish them. This is the chief aim of every good system of legislation, which is the art of leading men to the greatest possible happiness or to the least possible misery, according to calculation of all the goods and evils of life.

Patrick Colquhoun's influential work, A Treatise on the Police of the Metropolis (1797) was heavily influenced by Benthamite thought. Colquhoun's Thames River Police was founded on these principles, and in contrast to the Bow Street Runners, acted as a deterrent by their continual presence on the riverfront, in addition to being able to intervene if they spotted a crime in progress.

Edwin Chadwick's 1829 article, "Preventive police" in the London Review, argued that prevention ought to be the primary concern of a police body, which was not the case in practice. The reason, argued Chadwick, was that "A preventive police would act more immediately by placing difficulties in obtaining the objects of temptation." In contrast to a deterrent of punishment, a preventive police force would deter criminality by making crime cost-ineffective – "crime doesn't pay". In the second draft of his 1829 Police Act, the "object" of the new Metropolitan Police, was changed by Robert Peel to the "principal object," which was the "prevention of crime." Later historians would attribute the perception of England's "appearance of orderliness and love of public order" to the preventive principle entrenched in Peel's police system.

Development of modern police forces around the world was contemporary to the formation of the state, later defined by sociologist Max Weber as achieving a "monopoly on the legitimate use of physical force" and which was primarily exercised by the police and the military. Marxist theory situates the development of the modern state as part of the rise of capitalism, in which the police are one component of the bourgeoisie's repressive apparatus for subjugating the working class. By contrast, the Peelian principles argue that "the power of the police ... is dependent on public approval of their existence, actions and behavior", a philosophy known as policing by consent.

== Personnel and organization ==
Police forces include both preventive (uniformed) police and detectives. Terminology varies from country to country. Police functions include protecting life and property, enforcing criminal law, criminal investigations, regulating traffic, crowd control, public safety duties, civil defense, emergency management, searching for missing persons, lost property and other duties concerned with public order. Regardless of size, police forces are generally organized as a hierarchy with multiple ranks. The exact structures and the names of rank vary considerably by country.

=== Uniformed ===
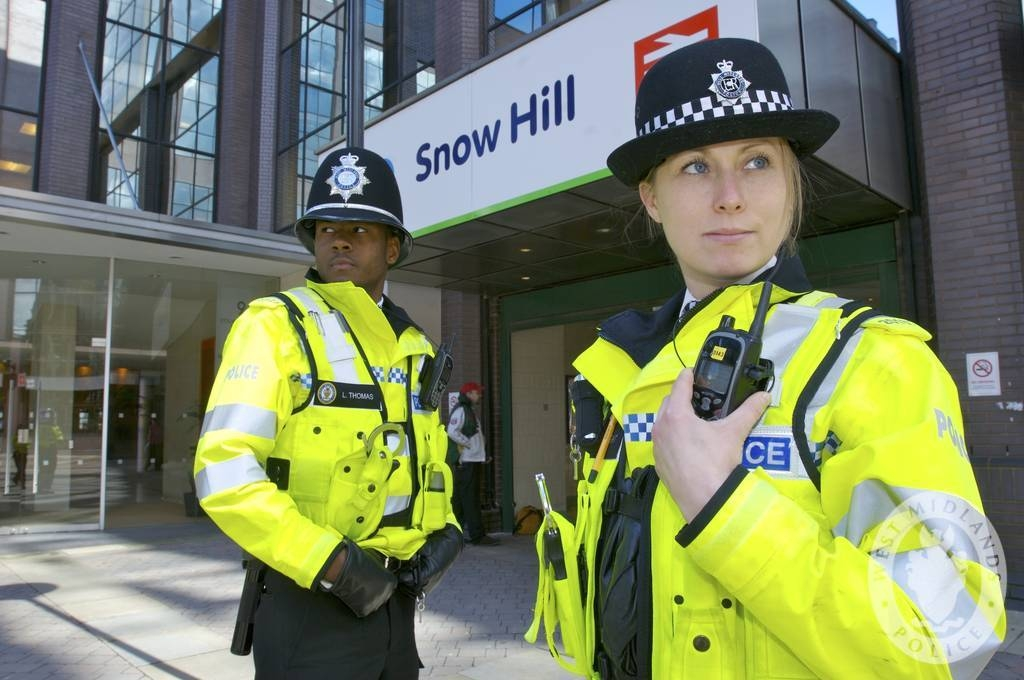
Uniformed police officers of the West Midlands Police

The police who wear uniforms make up the majority of a police service's personnel. Their main duty is to respond to calls for service. When not responding to these calls, they do work aimed at preventing crime, such as patrols. The uniformed police are known by varying names such as preventive police, the uniform branch/division, administrative police, order police, the patrol bureau/division, or patrol. In Australia and the United Kingdom, patrol personnel are also known as "general duties" officers. Atypically, Brazil's preventive police are known as Military Police.

As stated by the name, uniformed police wear uniforms. They perform functions that require an immediate recognition of an officer's legal authority and a potential need for force. Most commonly this means intervening to stop a crime in progress and securing the scene of a crime that has already happened. Besides dealing with crime, these officers may also manage and monitor traffic, carry out community policing duties, maintain order at public events or carry out searches for missing people (in 2012, the latter accounted for 14% of police time in the United Kingdom). As most of these duties must be available as a 24/7 service, uniformed police are required to do shift work.

=== Detectives ===
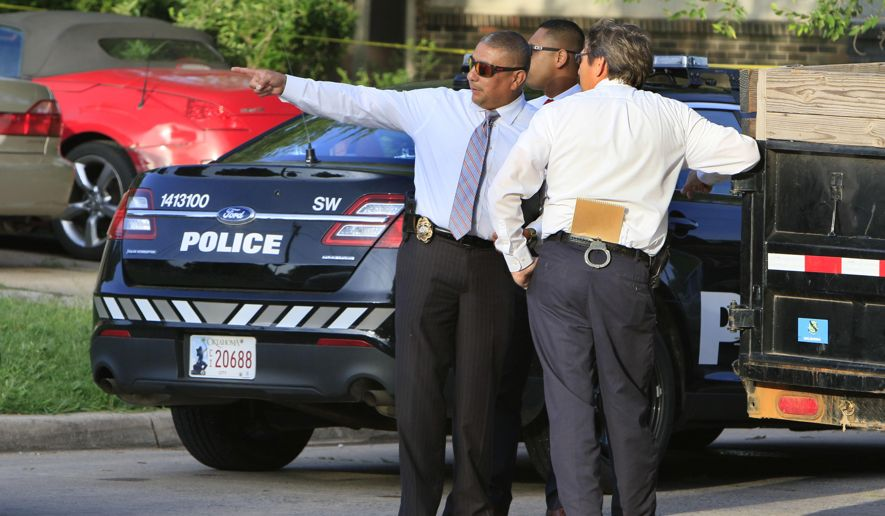
Oklahoma City Police Department detectives in "plainclothes" attire investigating a homicide crime scene

Police detectives are responsible for investigations and detective work. Detectives may be called Investigations Police, Judiciary/Judicial Police, or Criminal Police. In the United Kingdom, they are often referred to by the name of their department, the Criminal Investigation Department. Detectives typically make up roughly 15–25% of a police service's personnel.

Detectives, in contrast to uniformed police, typically wear business-styled attire in bureaucratic and investigative functions, where a uniformed presence would be either a distraction or intimidating but a need to establish police authority still exists. "Plainclothes" officers dress in attire consistent with that worn by the general public for purposes of blending in.

In some cases, police are assigned to work "undercover", where they conceal their police identity to investigate crimes, such as organized crime or narcotics crime, that are unsolvable by other means. In some cases, this type of policing shares aspects with espionage.

The relationship between detective and uniformed branches varies by country. In the United States, there is high variation within the country itself. Many American police departments require detectives to spend some time on temporary assignments in the patrol division. The argument is that rotating officers helps the detectives to better understand the uniformed officers' work, to promote cross-training in a wider variety of skills, and prevent "cliques" that can contribute to corruption or other unethical behavior. Conversely, some countries regard detective work as being an entirely separate profession, with detectives working in separate agencies and recruited without having to serve in uniform. A common compromise in English-speaking countries is that most detectives are recruited from the uniformed branch, but once qualified they tend to spend the rest of their careers in the detective branch.

Another point of variation is whether detectives have extra status. In some forces, such as the New York Police Department and Philadelphia Police Department, a regular detective holds a higher rank than a regular police officer. In others, such as British police and Canadian police, a regular detective has equal status with regular uniformed officers. Officers still have to take exams to move to the detective branch, but the move is regarded as being a specialization, rather than a promotion.

=== Volunteers and auxiliary ===
Police services often include part-time or volunteer officers, some of whom have other jobs outside policing. These may be paid positions or entirely volunteer. These are known by a variety of names, such as reserves, auxiliary police or special constables.

Other volunteer organizations work with the police and perform some of their duties. Groups in the U.S. including the Retired and Senior Volunteer Program, Community Emergency Response Team, and the Boy Scouts Police Explorers provide training, traffic and crowd control, disaster response, and other policing duties. In the U.S., the Volunteers in Police Service program assists over 200,000 volunteers in almost 2,000 programs. Volunteers may also work on the support staff. Examples of these schemes are Volunteers in Police Service in the US, Police Support Volunteers in the UK and Volunteers in Policing in New South Wales.

=== Specialized ===
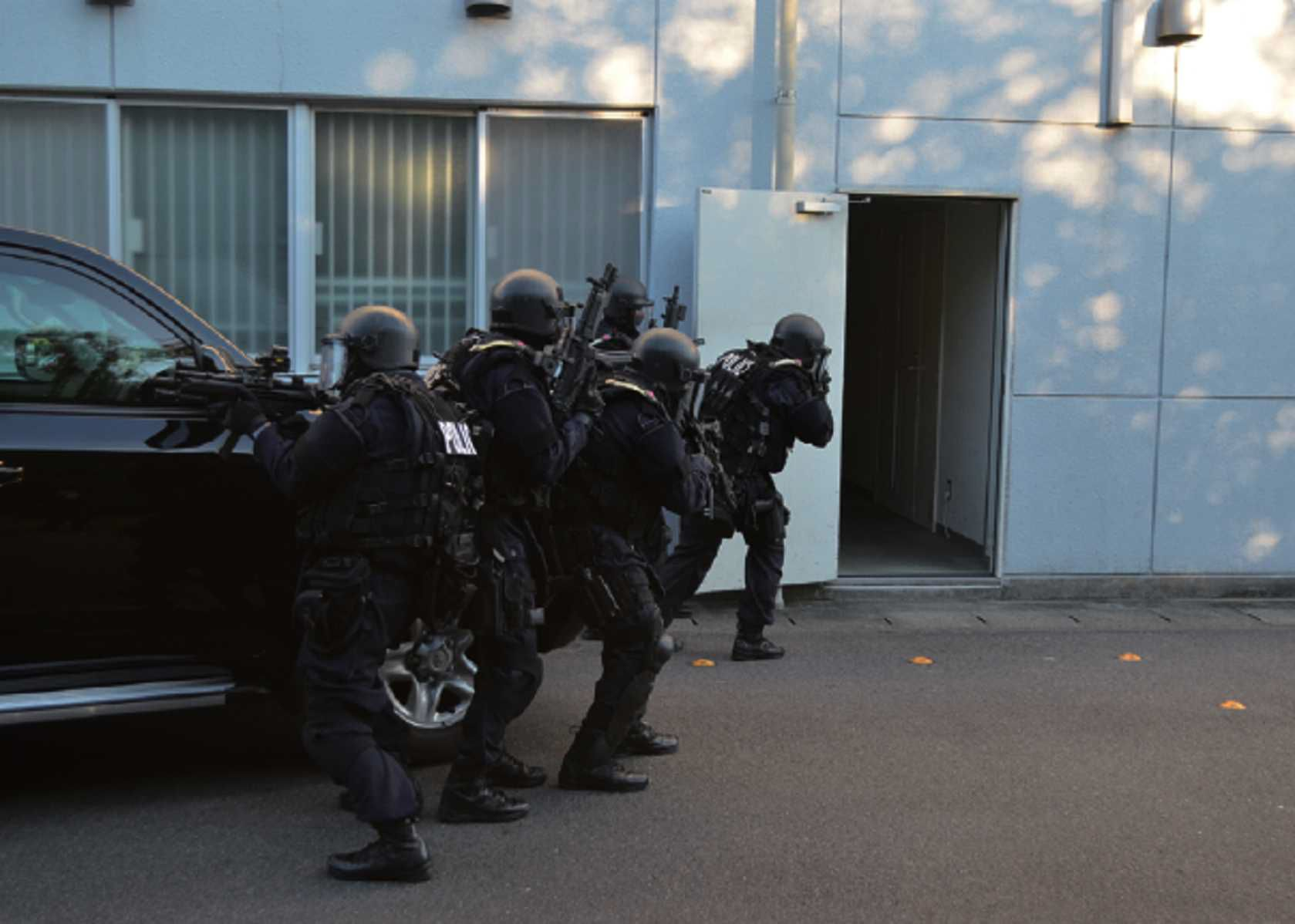
Japanese prefectural police Special Assault Team members preparing to enter a building

Specialized preventive and detective groups, or Specialist Investigation Departments, exist within many law enforcement organizations either for dealing with particular types of crime, such as traffic law enforcement, K9/use of police dogs, crash investigation, homicide, or fraud; or for situations requiring specialized skills, such as underwater search, aviation, explosive disposal ("bomb squad"), and computer crime.

Most larger jurisdictions employ police tactical units, specially selected and trained paramilitary units with specialized equipment, weapons, and training, for the purposes of dealing with particularly violent situations beyond the capability of a patrol officer response, including standoffs, counterterrorism, and rescue operations.

In counterinsurgency-type campaigns, select and specially trained units of police armed and equipped as light infantry have been designated as police field forces who perform paramilitary-type patrols and ambushes whilst retaining their police powers in areas that were highly dangerous.

Because their situational mandate typically focuses on removing innocent bystanders from dangerous people and dangerous situations, not violent resolution, they are often equipped with non-lethal tactical tools like chemical agents, stun grenades, and rubber bullets. The Specialist Firearms Command (MO19) of the Metropolitan Police in London is a group of armed police used in dangerous situations including hostage taking, armed robbery/assault and terrorism.

=== Administrative duties ===
Police may have administrative duties that are not directly related to enforcing the law, such as issuing firearms licenses. The extent that police have these functions varies among countries, with police in France, Germany, and other continental European countries handling such tasks to a greater extent than British counterparts.

=== Military ===
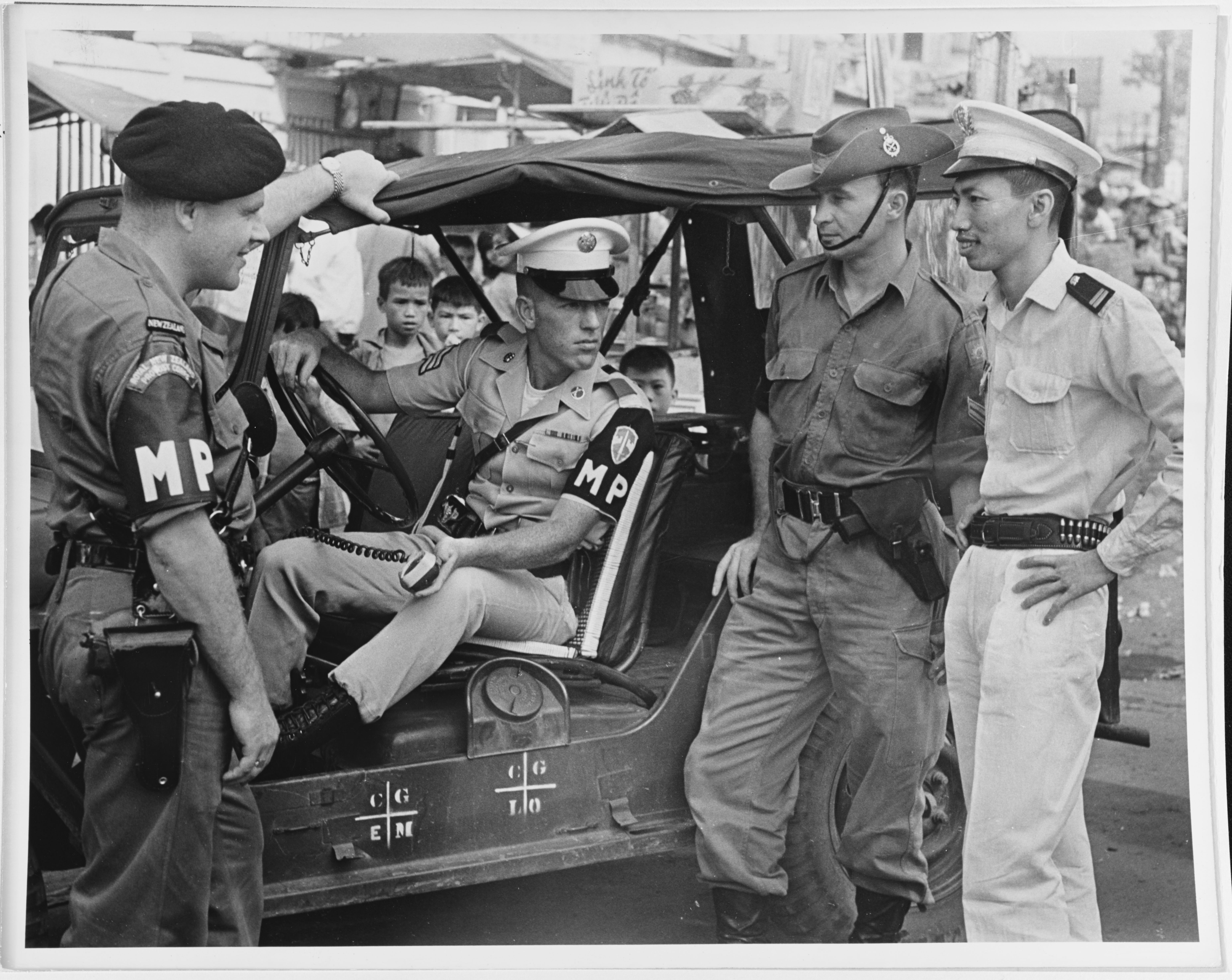
American, Australian, and New Zealand military police with a civilian police officer in Saigon during the Vietnam War, 1965

Military police may refer to:

- a section of the military solely responsible for policing the armed forces, referred to as provosts (e.g., United States Air Force Security Forces)
- a section of the military responsible for policing in both the armed forces and in the civilian population (e.g., most gendarmeries, such as the French Gendarmerie, the Italian Carabinieri, the Spanish Guardia Civil, and the Portuguese National Republican Guard)
- a section of the military solely responsible for policing the civilian population (e.g., Romanian Gendarmerie)
- the civilian preventive police of a Brazilian state (e.g., Policia Militar)
- a special military law enforcement service (e.g., Russian Military Police)

=== Religious ===
Some jurisdictions with religious laws may have dedicated religious police to enforce said laws. These religious police forces, which may operate either as a unit of a wider police force or as an independent agency, may only have jurisdiction over members of said religion, or they may have the ability to enforce religious customs nationwide regardless of individual religious beliefs.

Religious police may enforce social norms, gender roles, dress codes, and dietary laws per religious doctrine and laws, and may also prohibit practices that run contrary to said doctrine, such as atheism, proselytism, homosexuality, socialization between different genders, business operations during religious periods or events such as salah or the Sabbath, or the sale and possession of "offending material" ranging from pornography to foreign media.

Forms of religious law enforcement were relatively common in historical religious civilizations, but eventually declined in favor of religious tolerance and pluralism. One of the most common forms of religious police in the modern world are Islamic religious police, which enforce the application of Sharia (Islamic religious law). As of 2018, there are eight Islamic countries that maintain Islamic religious police: Afghanistan, Iran, Iraq, Mauritania, Pakistan, Saudi Arabia, Sudan, and Yemen.

Some forms of religious police may not enforce religious law, but rather suppress religion or religious extremism. This is often done for ideological reasons; for example, communist states such as China and Vietnam have historically suppressed and tightly controlled religions such as Christianity.

=== Secret ===
Secret police organizations are typically used to suppress dissidents for engaging in non-politically correct communications and activities, which are deemed counter-productive to what the state and related establishment promote. Secret police interventions to stop such activities are often illegal, and are designed to debilitate, in various ways, the people targeted in order to limit or stop outright their ability to act in a non-politically correct manner. The methods employed may involve spying, various acts of deception, intimidation, framing, false imprisonment, false incarceration under mental health legislation, and physical violence. Countries widely reported to use secret police organizations include China (The Ministry of State Security) and North Korea (The Ministry of State Security).

== By country ==
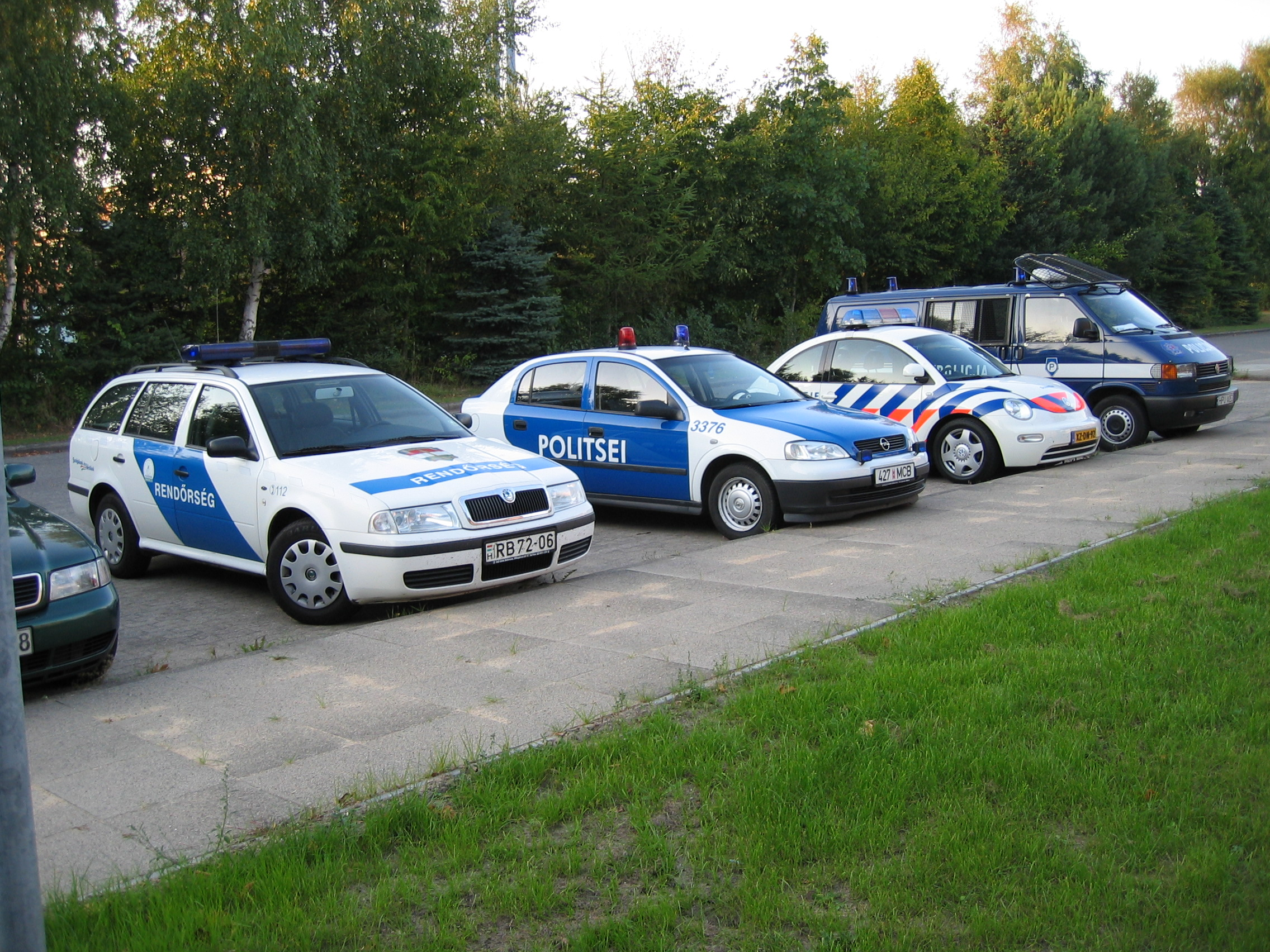
Hungarian, Estonian, Dutch, and Polish police cars in 2003

Police forces are usually organized and funded by some level of government. The level of government responsible for policing varies from place to place, and may be at the national, regional or local level. Some countries have police forces that serve the same territory, with their jurisdiction depending on the type of crime or other circumstances. Other countries, such as Austria, Chile, Israel, New Zealand, the Philippines, South Africa and Sweden, have a single national police force.

In some places with multiple national police forces, one common arrangement is to have a civilian police force and a paramilitary gendarmerie, such as the Police Nationale and National Gendarmerie in France. The French policing system spread to other countries through the Napoleonic Wars and the French colonial empire. Another example is the Policía Nacional and Guardia Civil in Spain. In both France and Spain, the civilian force polices urban areas and the paramilitary force polices rural areas. Italy has a similar arrangement with the Polizia di Stato and Carabinieri, though their jurisdictions overlap more. Some countries have separate agencies for uniformed police and detectives, such as the Military Police and Civil Police in Brazil and the Carabineros and Investigations Police in Chile.

Other countries have sub-national police forces, but for the most part their jurisdictions do not overlap. In many countries, especially federations, there may be two or more tiers of police force, each serving different levels of government and enforcing different subsets of the law. In Australia and Germany, the majority of policing is carried out by state (i.e. provincial) police forces, which are supplemented by a federal police force. Though not a federation, the United Kingdom has a similar arrangement, where policing is primarily the responsibility of a regional police force and specialist units exist at the national level. In Canada, the Royal Canadian Mounted Police (RCMP) are the federal police, while municipalities can decide whether to run a local police service or to contract local policing duties to a larger one. Most urban areas have a local police service, while most rural areas contract it to the RCMP, or to the provincial police in Ontario and Quebec.

The United States has a highly decentralized and fragmented system of law enforcement, with over 17,000 state and local law enforcement agencies. These agencies include local police departments, county law enforcement (often in the form of a sheriff's offices, or county police), state troopers and federal law enforcement agencies. Federal agencies, such as the FBI, only have jurisdiction over federal crimes or those that involve more than one state. Other federal agencies have jurisdiction over a specific type of crime. Examples include the Federal Protective Service, which patrols and protects government buildings; the Postal Inspection Service, which protect United States Postal Service facilities, vehicles and items; the Park Police, which protect national parks; and Amtrak Police, which patrol Amtrak stations and trains. There are also some government agencies and uniformed services that perform police functions in addition to other duties, such as the Coast Guard.

== International ==
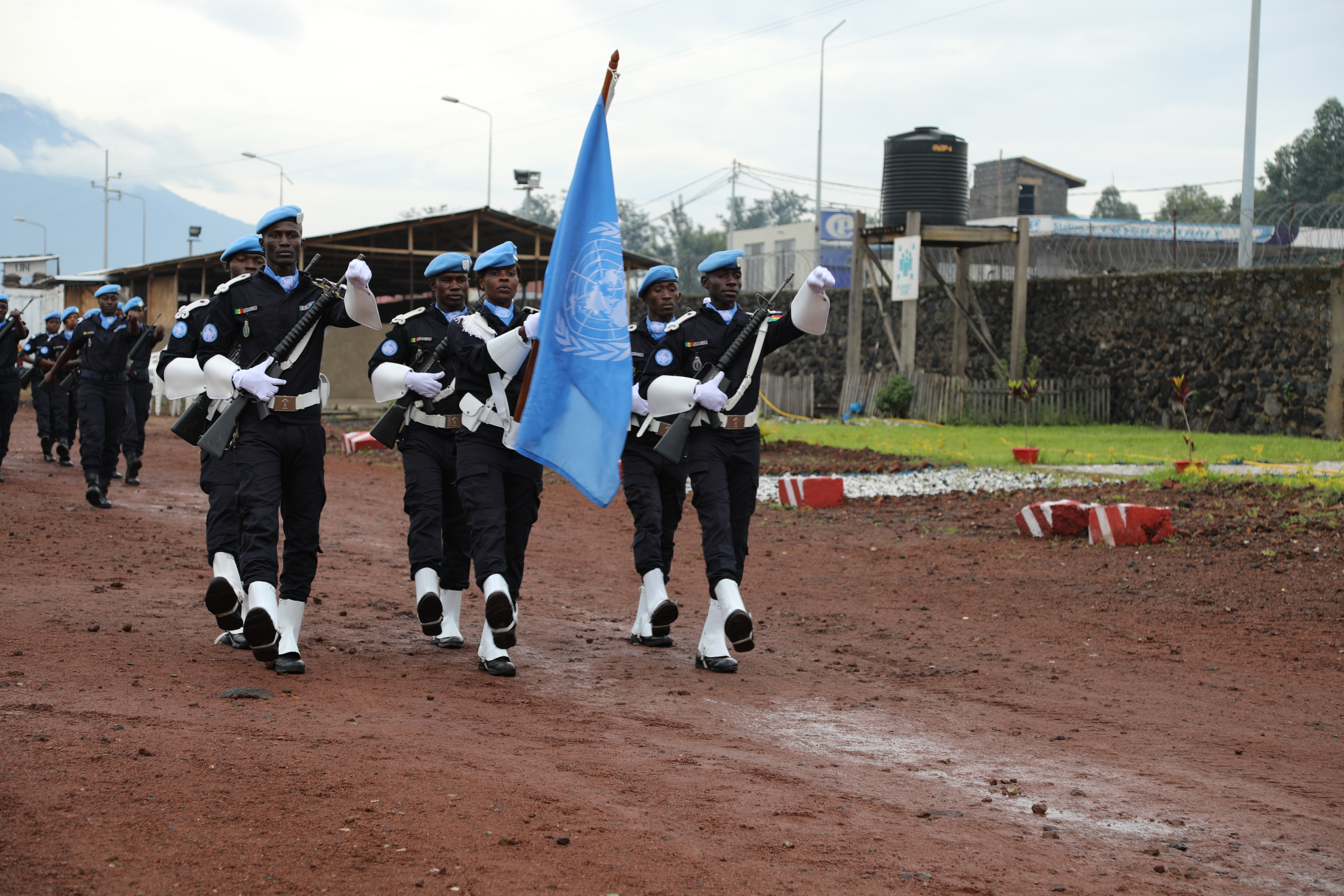
United Nations Police members in Goma, Democratic Republic of the Congo

Most countries are members of the International Criminal Police Organization (Interpol), established to detect and fight transnational crime and provide for international co-operation and co-ordination of other police activities, such as notifying relatives of the death of foreign nationals. Interpol does not conduct investigations or arrests by itself, but only serves as a central point for information on crime, suspects and criminals. Political crimes are excluded from its competencies.

The terms international policing, transnational policing, and/or global policing began to be used from the early 1990s onwards to describe forms of policing that transcended the boundaries of the sovereign nation-state. These terms refer in variable ways to practices and forms for policing that, in some sense, transcend national borders. This includes a variety of practices, but international police cooperation, criminal intelligence exchange between police agencies working in different nation-states, and police development-aid to weak, failed or failing states are the three types that have received the most scholarly attention.

Historical studies reveal that policing agents have undertaken a variety of cross-border police missions for many years. For example, in the 19th century a number of European policing agencies undertook cross-border surveillance because of concerns about anarchist agitators and other political radicals. A notable example of this was the occasional surveillance by Prussian police of Karl Marx during the years he remained resident in London. The interests of public police agencies in cross-border co-operation in the control of political radicalism and ordinary law crime were primarily initiated in Europe, which eventually led to the establishment of Interpol before World War II. There are also many interesting examples of cross-border policing under private auspices and by municipal police forces that date back to the 19th century. It has been established that modern policing has transgressed national boundaries from time to time almost from its inception. It is also generally agreed that in the post–Cold War era this type of practice became more significant and frequent.

Few empirical works on the practices of inter/transnational information and intelligence sharing have been undertaken. A notable exception is James Sheptycki's study of police cooperation in the English Channel region, which provides a systematic content analysis of information exchange files and a description of how these transnational information and intelligence exchanges are transformed into police casework. The study showed that transnational police information sharing was routinized in the cross-Channel region from 1968 on the basis of agreements directly between the police agencies and without any formal agreement between the countries concerned. By 1992, with the signing of the Schengen Treaty, which formalized aspects of police information exchange across the territory of the European Union, there were worries that much, if not all, of this intelligence sharing was opaque, raising questions about the efficacy of the accountability mechanisms governing police information sharing in Europe.

Studies of this kind outside of Europe are even rarer, so it is difficult to make generalizations, but one small-scale study that compared transnational police information and intelligence sharing practices at specific cross-border locations in North America and Europe confirmed that the low visibility of police information and intelligence sharing was a common feature. Intelligence-led policing is now common practice in most advanced countries and it is likely that police intelligence sharing and information exchange has a common morphology around the world. James Sheptycki has analyzed the effects of the new information technologies on the organization of policing-intelligence and suggests that a number of "organizational pathologies" have arisen that make the functioning of security-intelligence processes in transnational policing deeply problematic. He argues that transnational police information circuits help to "compose the panic scenes of the security-control society". The paradoxical effect is that, the harder policing agencies work to produce security, the greater are feelings of insecurity.

Police development-aid to weak, failed or failing states is another form of transnational policing that has garnered attention. This form of transnational policing plays an increasingly important role in United Nations peacekeeping and this looks set to grow in the years ahead, especially as the international community seeks to develop the rule of law and reform security institutions in states recovering from conflict. With transnational police development-aid the imbalances of power between donors and recipients are stark and there are questions about the applicability and transportability of policing models between jurisdictions.

One topic concerns making transnational policing institutions democratically accountable. According to the Global Accountability Report for 2007, Interpol had the lowest scores in its category (IGOs), coming in tenth with a score of 22% on overall accountability capabilities.

=== Overseas policing ===
A police force may establish its presence in a foreign country with or without the permission of the host state. In the case of China and the ruling Communist Party, this has involved setting up unofficial police service stations around the world, and using coercive means to influence the behaviour of members of the Chinese diaspora and especially those who hold Chinese citizenship. Political dissidents have been harassed and intimidated in a form of transnational repression and convinced to return to China. Many of these actions were illegal in the states where they occurred. Such police stations have been established in dozens of countries around the world, with some, such as the UK and the US, forcing them to close.

== Equipment ==
=== Weapons ===
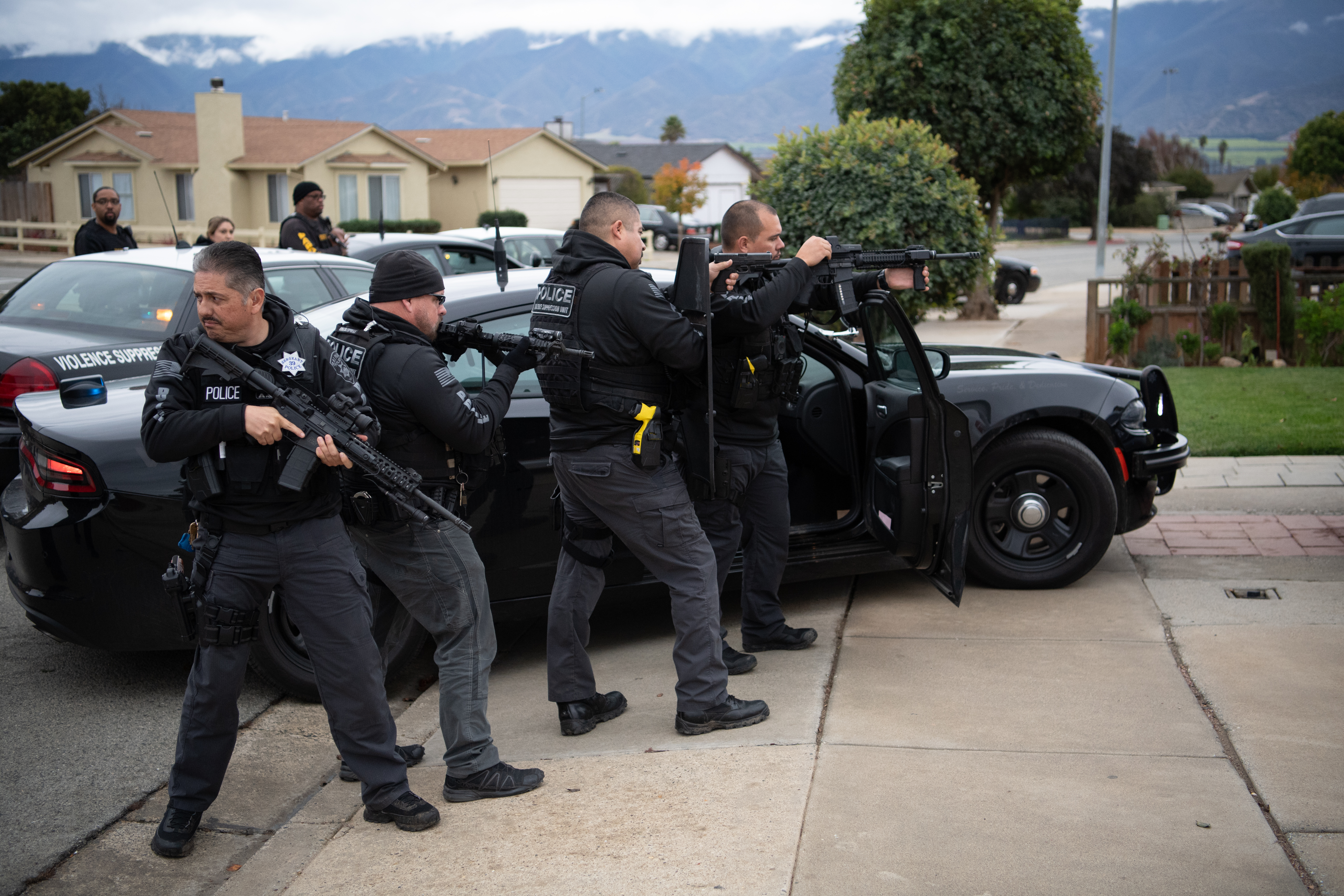
Police officers and U.S. Marshals deputies conducting an arrest in Salinas, California, carrying a variety of weaponry

In many jurisdictions, police officers carry firearms, primarily handguns, in the normal course of their duties. In the United Kingdom (except Northern Ireland), Iceland, Ireland, New Zealand, Norway, and Malta, with the exception of specialist units, officers do not carry firearms as a matter of course. New Zealand and Norwegian police carry firearms in their vehicles, but not on their duty belts, and must obtain authorization before the weapons can be removed from the vehicle unless their life or the life of others are in danger.

Police often have specialized units for handling armed offenders or dangerous situations where combat is likely, such as police tactical units or authorised firearms officers. In some jurisdictions, depending on the circumstances, police can call on the military for assistance, as military aid to the civil power is an aspect of many armed forces. Perhaps the most high-profile example of this was in 1980, when the British Army's Special Air Service was deployed to resolve the Iranian Embassy siege on behalf of the Metropolitan Police.

They can also be armed with "non-lethal" (more accurately known as "less than lethal" or "less-lethal" given that they can still be deadly) weaponry, particularly for riot control, or to inflict pain against a resistant suspect to force them to surrender without lethally wounding them. Non-lethal weapons include batons, tear gas, riot control agents, rubber bullets, riot shields, water cannons, and electroshock weapons. Police officers typically carry handcuffs to restrain suspects.

The use of firearms or deadly force is typically a last resort only to be used when necessary to save the lives of others or themselves, though some jurisdictions (such as Brazil) allow its use against fleeing felons and escaped convicts. Police officers in the United States are generally allowed to use deadly force if they believe their life is in danger, a policy that has been criticized for being vague. South African police have a "shoot-to-kill" policy, which allows officers to use deadly force against any person who poses a significant threat to them. With the country having one of the highest rates of violent crime, President Jacob Zuma stated that South Africa needs to handle crime differently from other countries.

=== Communications ===
Modern police forces make extensive use of two-way radio communications equipment, carried both on the person and installed in vehicles, to coordinate their work, share information, and get help quickly. Vehicle-installed mobile data terminals enhance the ability of police communications, enabling easier dispatching of calls, criminal background checks on persons of interest to be completed in a matter of seconds, and updating officers' daily activity log and other required reports, on a real-time basis. Other common pieces of police equipment include flashlights, whistles, police notebooks, and "ticket books" or citations. Some police departments have developed advanced computerized data display and communication systems to bring real time data to officers, one example being the NYPD's Domain Awareness System.

=== Vehicles ===
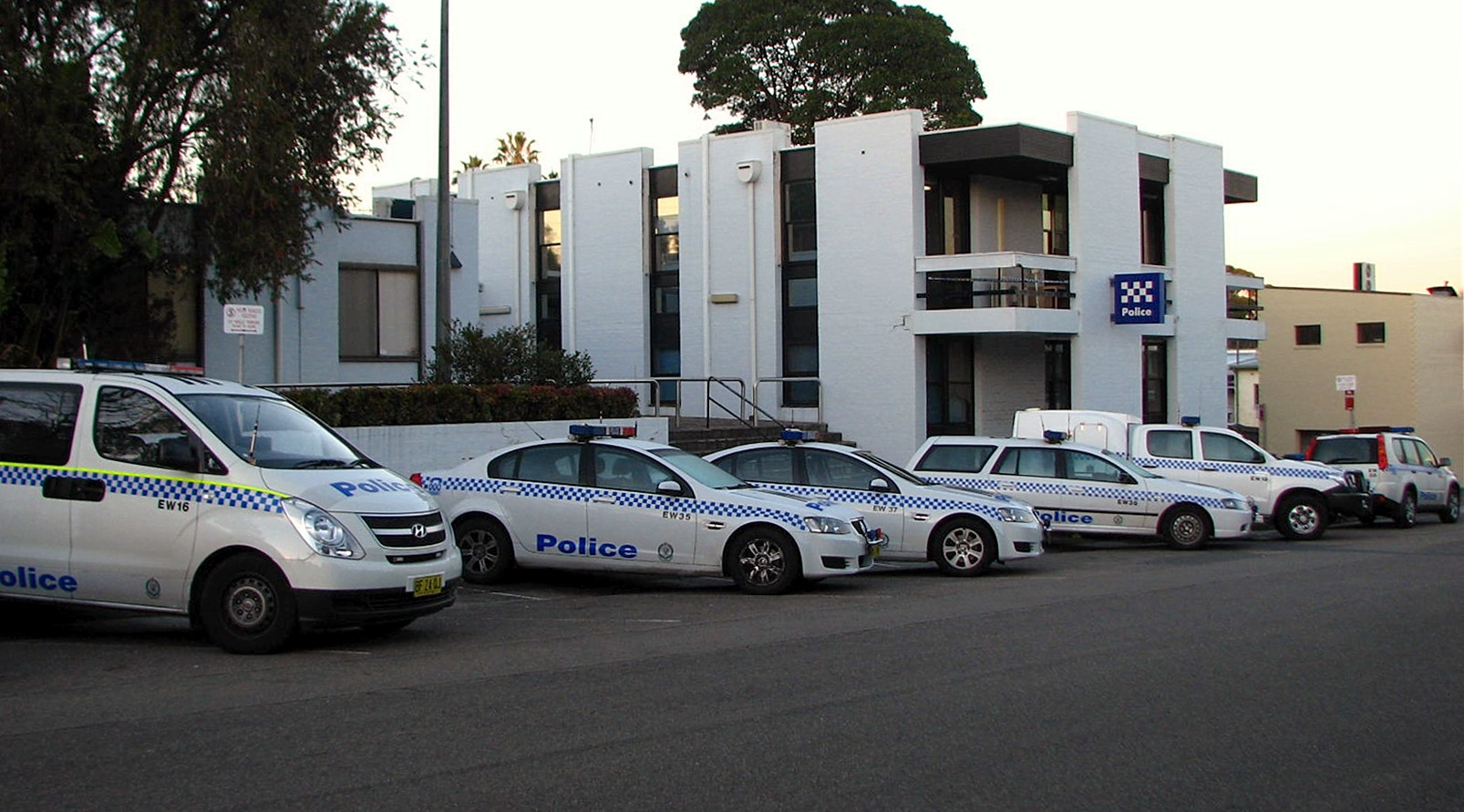
New South Wales Police Force vehicles outside a police station in Eastwood, Sydney

Police vehicles are used for detaining, patrolling, and transporting over wide areas that an officer could not effectively cover otherwise. The average police car used for standard patrol is a four-door sedan, SUV, or CUV, often modified by the manufacturer or police force's fleet services to provide better performance. Pickup trucks, off-road vehicles, and vans are often used in utility roles, though in some jurisdictions or situations (such as those where dirt roads are common, off-roading is required, or the nature of the officer's assignment necessitates it), they may be used as standard patrol cars. Sports cars are typically not used by police due to cost and maintenance issues, though those that are used are typically only assigned to traffic enforcement or community policing, and are rarely, if ever, assigned to standard patrol or authorized to respond to dangerous calls (such as armed calls or pursuits) where the likelihood of the vehicle being damaged or destroyed is high. Police vehicles are usually marked with appropriate symbols and equipped with sirens and flashing emergency lights to make others aware of police presence or response; in most jurisdictions, police vehicles with their sirens and emergency lights on have right of way in traffic, while in other jurisdictions, emergency lights may be kept on while patrolling to ensure ease of visibility. Unmarked or undercover police vehicles are used primarily for traffic enforcement or apprehending criminals without alerting them to their presence. The use of unmarked police vehicles for traffic enforcement is controversial, with the state of New York banning this practice in 1996 on the grounds that it endangered motorists who might be pulled over by police impersonators.

Motorcycles, having historically been a mainstay in police fleets, are commonly used, particularly in locations that a car may not be able to reach, to control potential public order situations involving meetings of motorcyclists, and often in police escorts where motorcycle police officers can quickly clear a path for escorted vehicles. Bicycle patrols are used in some areas, often downtown areas or parks, because they allow for wider and faster area coverage than officers on foot. Bicycles are also commonly used by riot police to create makeshift barricades against protesters.

Police aviation consists of helicopters and fixed-wing aircraft, while police watercraft tend to consist of RHIBs, motorboats, and patrol boats. SWAT vehicles are used by police tactical units, and often consist of four-wheeled armored personnel carriers used to transport tactical teams while providing armored cover, equipment storage space, or makeshift battering ram capabilities; these vehicles are typically not armed and do not patrol and are only used to transport. Mobile command posts may also be used by some police forces to establish identifiable command centers at the scene of major situations.

Police cars may contain issued long guns, ammunition for issued weapons, less-lethal weaponry, riot control equipment, traffic cones, road flares, physical barricades or barricade tape, fire extinguishers, first aid kits, or defibrillators.

== Strategies ==
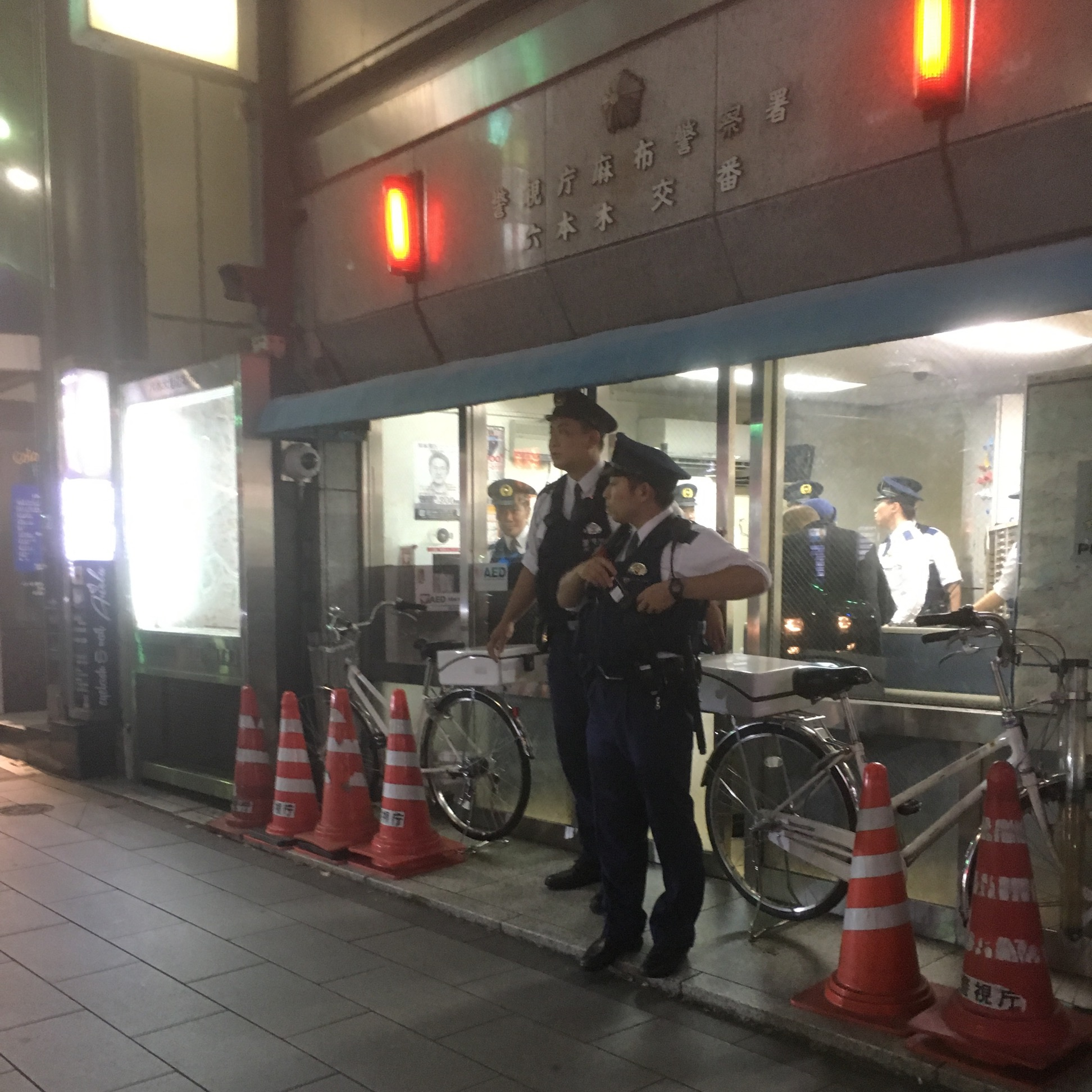
Tokyo Metropolitan Police Department officers outside a kōban (small police station) in Roppongi, Tokyo. Kōban allow police to establish a permanent police presence and offer police station services across a wide area, while taking up minimal space.

The advent of the police car, two-way radio, and telephone in the early 20th century transformed policing into a reactive strategy that focused on responding to calls for service away from their beat. With this transformation, police command and control became more centralized.

In the United States, August Vollmer introduced other reforms, including education requirements for police officers. O.W. Wilson, a student of Vollmer, helped reduce corruption and introduce professionalism in Wichita, Kansas, and later in the Chicago Police Department. Strategies employed by O.W. Wilson included rotating officers from community to community to reduce their vulnerability to corruption, establishing of a non-partisan police board to help govern the police force, a strict merit system for promotions within the department, and an aggressive recruiting drive with higher police salaries to attract professionally qualified officers. During the professionalism era of policing, law enforcement agencies concentrated on dealing with felonies and other serious crime and conducting visible car patrols in between, rather than broader focus on crime prevention.

The Kansas City Preventive Patrol study in the early 1970s showed flaws in using visible car patrols for crime prevention. It found that aimless car patrols did little to deter crime and often went unnoticed by the public. Patrol officers in cars had insufficient contact and interaction with the community, leading to a social rift between the two. In the 1980s and 1990s, many law enforcement agencies began to adopt community policing strategies, and others adopted problem-oriented policing.

Broken windows' policing was another, related approach introduced in the 1980s by James Q. Wilson and George L. Kelling, who suggested that police should pay greater attention to minor "quality of life" offenses and disorderly conduct. The concept behind this method is simple: broken windows, graffiti, and other physical destruction or degradation of property create an environment in which crime and disorder is more likely. The presence of broken windows and graffiti sends a message that authorities do not care and are not trying to correct problems in these areas. Therefore, correcting these small problems prevents more serious criminal activity. The theory was popularised in the early 1990s by police chief William J. Bratton and New York City Mayor Rudy Giuliani. It was emulated in 2010s in Kazakhstan through zero tolerance policing. Yet it failed to produce meaningful results in this country because citizens distrusted police while state leaders preferred police loyalty over police good behavior.

Building upon these earlier models, intelligence-led policing has also become an important strategy. Intelligence-led policing and problem-oriented policing are complementary strategies, both of which involve systematic use of information. Although it still lacks a universally accepted definition, the crux of intelligence-led policing is an emphasis on the collection and analysis of information to guide police operations, rather than the reverse.

A related development is evidence-based policing. In a similar vein to evidence-based policy, evidence-based policing is the use of controlled experiments to find which methods of policing are more effective. Leading advocates of evidence-based policing include the criminologist Lawrence W. Sherman and philanthropist Jerry Lee. Findings from controlled experiments include the Minneapolis Domestic Violence Experiment, evidence that patrols deter crime if they are concentrated in crime hotspots and that restricting police powers to shoot suspects does not cause an increase in crime or violence against police officers. A 2013 study found policing decreases crime through deterrence with an elasticity of roughly -0.5. Use of experiments to assess the usefulness of strategies has been endorsed by many police services and institutions, including the U.S. Police Foundation and the UK College of Policing.

== Clearance rate ==
In criminal justice, a clearance rate is a measure of how many crimes have been solved in a specific geographical region during a specific time period, usually given as a percentage. Various groups use clearance rates as a measure of crimes solved by the police.

== Power restrictions and accountability ==
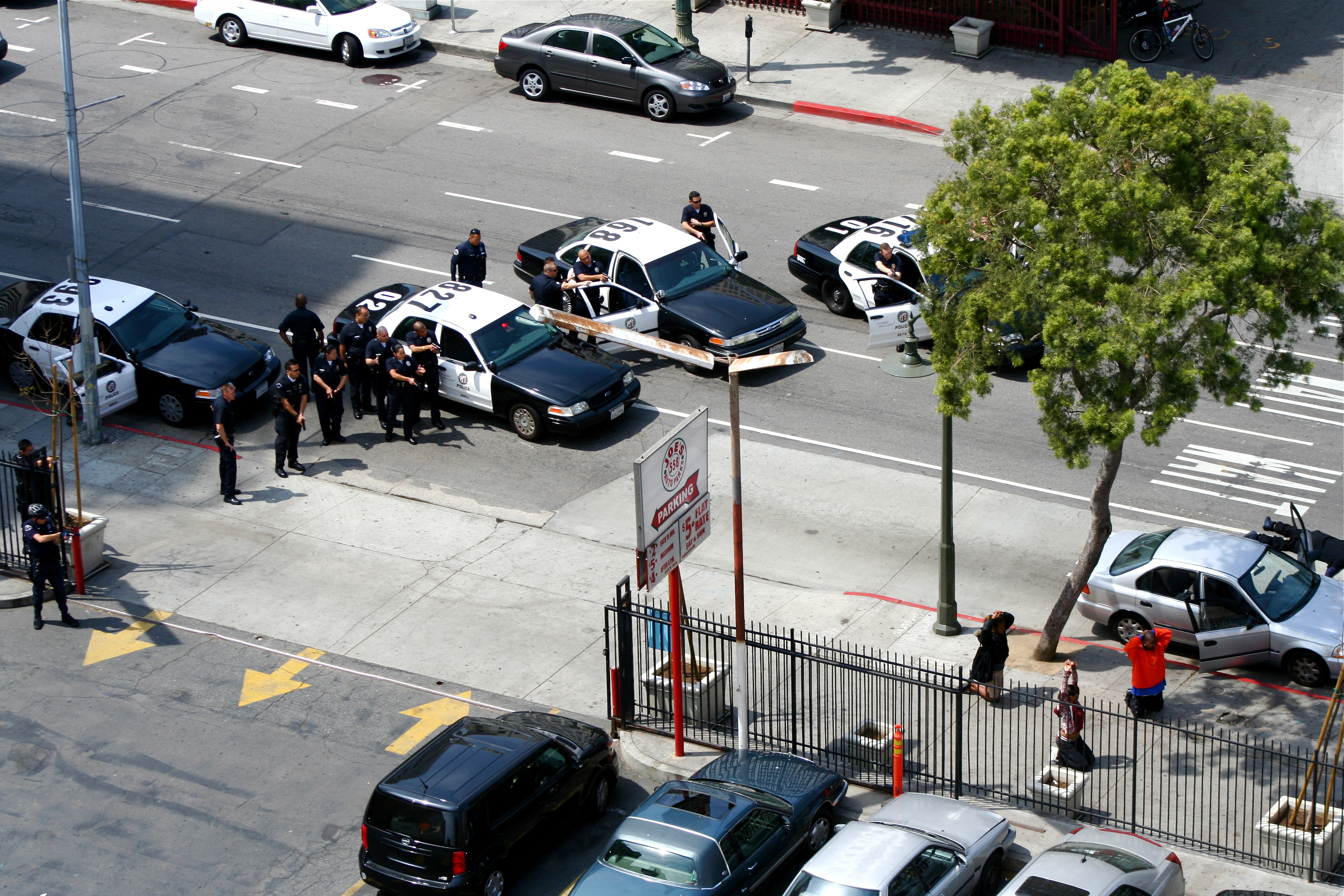
Los Angeles Police Department officers arresting suspects during a traffic stop

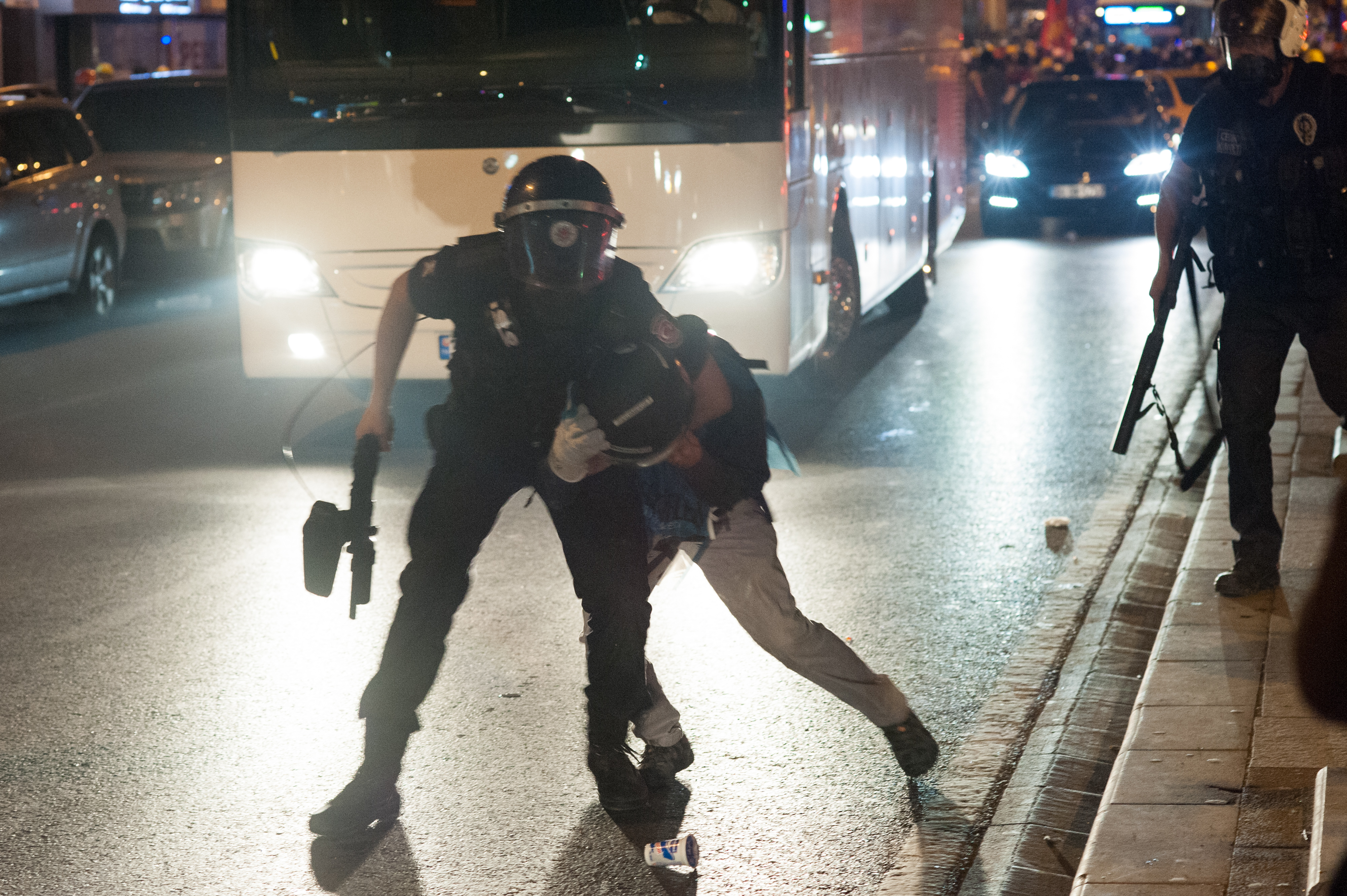
A General Directorate of Security riot control officer using force on a protester during the Gezi Park protests in Turkey

In many nations, criminal procedure law has been developed to regulate officers' discretion, so that they do not arbitrarily or unjustly exercise their powers of arrest, search and seizure, and use of force. In the United States, Miranda v. Arizona led to the widespread use of Miranda warnings or constitutional warnings. Police forces also find themselves under criticism for their use of force, particularly deadly force.

In Miranda the court created safeguards against self-incriminating statements made after an arrest. The court held that "The prosecution may not use statements, whether exculpatory or inculpatory, stemming from questioning initiated by law enforcement officers after a person has been taken into custody or otherwise deprived of his freedom of action in any significant way, unless it demonstrates the use of procedural safeguards effective to secure the Fifth Amendment's privilege against self-incrimination"

Police in the United States are also prohibited from holding criminal suspects for more than a reasonable amount of time (usually 24–48 hours) before arraignment, using torture, abuse or physical threats to extract confessions, using excessive force to effect an arrest, and searching suspects' bodies or their homes without a warrant obtained upon a showing of probable cause. The four exceptions to the constitutional requirement of a search warrant are:

- Consent
- Search incident to arrest
- Motor vehicle searches
- Exigent circumstances

In Terry v. Ohio (1968) the court divided seizure into two parts, the investigatory stop and arrest. The court further held that during an investigatory stop a police officer's search " [is] confined to what [is] minimally necessary to determine whether [a suspect] is armed, and the intrusion, which [is] made for the sole purpose of protecting himself and others nearby, [is] confined to ascertaining the presence of weapons" (U.S. Supreme Court). Before Terry, every police encounter constituted an arrest, giving the police officer the full range of search authority. Search authority during a Terry stop (investigatory stop) is limited to weapons only.

Using deception for confessions is permitted, but not coercion. There are exceptions or exigent circumstances such as an articulated need to disarm a suspect or searching a suspect who has already been arrested (Search Incident to an Arrest). The Posse Comitatus Act severely restricts the use of the military for police activity, giving added importance to police SWAT units.

British police officers are governed by similar rules, such as those introduced to England and Wales under the Police and Criminal Evidence Act 1984 (PACE), but generally have greater powers. They may, for example, legally search any suspect who has been arrested, or their vehicles, home or business premises, without a warrant, and may seize anything they find in a search as evidence.

All police officers in the United Kingdom, whatever their actual rank, are 'constables' in terms of their legal position. This means that a newly appointed constable has the same arrest powers as a Chief Constable or Commissioner. However, certain higher ranks have additional powers to authorize certain aspects of police operations, such as a power to authorize a search of a suspect's house (section 18 PACE in England and Wales) by an officer of the rank of Inspector, or the power to authorize a suspect's detention beyond 24 hours by a Superintendent.

=== Accountability ===
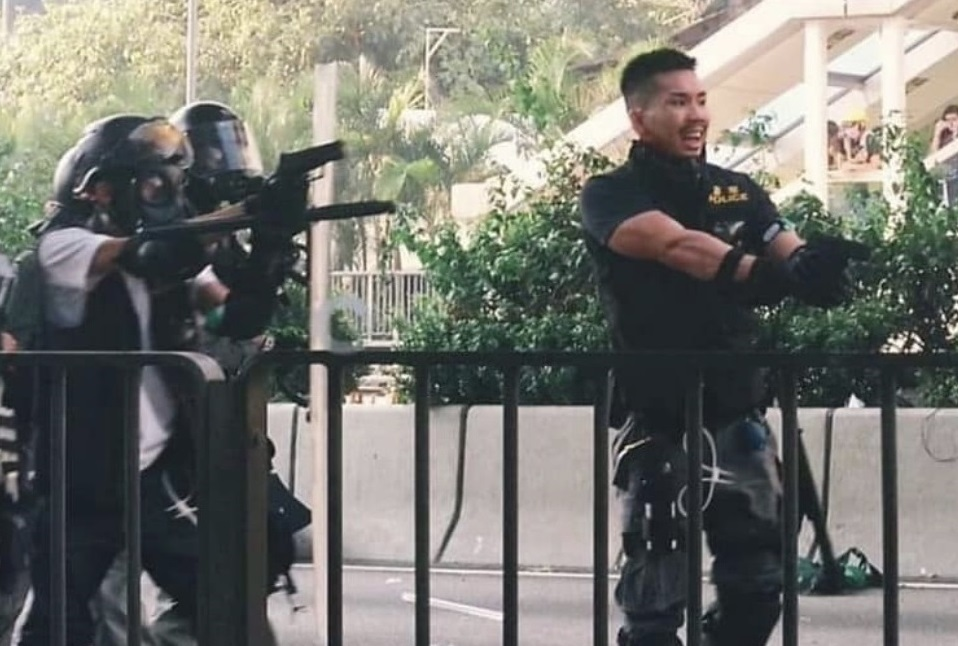
Hong Kong Police Force officers aiming firearms at protestors in Wong Tai Sin District during the 2019–2020 Hong Kong protests

Police services commonly include units for investigating crimes committed by the police themselves. These units are typically called internal affairs or inspectorate-general units. In some countries separate organizations outside the police exist for such purposes, such as the British Independent Office for Police Conduct. In the United States, due to American laws around qualified immunity, it has become increasingly difficult to investigate and charge police misconduct and crimes.

Likewise, some state and local jurisdictions, for example, Springfield, Illinois have similar outside review organizations. The Police Service of Northern Ireland is investigated by the Police Ombudsman for Northern Ireland, an external agency set up as a result of the Patten report into policing the province. In the Republic of Ireland, the Garda Síochána is investigated by Fiosrú – the Office of the Police Ombudsman, a body founded as Garda Síochána Ombudsman Commission to replace the Garda Complaints Board in May 2007, and reorganised under its new title in 2025.

The Special Investigations Unit of Ontario, Canada, is one of only a few civilian agencies around the world responsible for investigating circumstances involving police and others that have resulted in a death, serious injury, or allegations of sexual assault. The agency has made allegations of insufficient cooperation from various police services hindering their investigations.

In Hong Kong, any allegations of corruption within the police are investigated by the Independent Commission Against Corruption and the Independent Police Complaints Council, two agencies which are independent of the police force.

Police body cameras are often worn by police officers to record their interactions with the public and each other, providing audiovisual recorded evidence for review in the event an officer or agency's actions are investigated.

=== Selective enforcement ===
Tensions can increase when a police officer of one ethnic group harms or kills a suspect of another one. In the United States, such events occasionally spark protests and accusations of racism against police and allegations that police departments practice racial profiling. Similar incidents have also happened in other countries.

In the United States since the 1960s, concern over such issues has increasingly weighed upon law enforcement agencies, courts and legislatures at every level of government. Incidents such as the 1965 Watts riots, the videotaped 1991 beating by LAPD officers of Rodney King, and the riot following their acquittal have been suggested by some people to be evidence that U.S. police are dangerously lacking in appropriate controls.

The fact that this trend has occurred contemporaneously with the rise of the civil rights movement, the "war on drugs", and a precipitous rise in violent crime from the 1960s to the 1990s has made questions surrounding the role, administration and scope of police authority increasingly complicated.

Police departments and the local governments that oversee them in some jurisdictions have attempted to mitigate some of these issues through community outreach programs and community policing to make the police more accessible to the concerns of local communities, by working to increase hiring diversity, by updating training of police in their responsibilities to the community and under the law, and by increased oversight within the department or by civilian commissions.

In cases in which such measures have been lacking or absent, civil lawsuits have been brought by the United States Department of Justice against local law enforcement agencies, authorized under the 1994 Violent Crime Control and Law Enforcement Act. This has compelled local departments to make organizational changes, enter into consent decree settlements to adopt such measures, and submit to oversight by the Justice Department.

In May 2020, a global movement to increase scrutiny of police violence grew in popularity, starting in Minneapolis, Minnesota with the murder of George Floyd. Calls for defunding of the police and full abolition of the police gained larger support in the United States as more criticized systemic racism in policing.

Critics also argue that sometimes this abuse of force or power can extend to police officer civilian life as well. For example, critics note that women in around 40% of police officer families have experienced domestic violence and that police officers are convicted of misdemeanors and felonies at a rate of more than six times higher than concealed carry weapon permit holders.

=== Protection of individuals ===
The Supreme Court of the United States has consistently ruled that law enforcement officers in the U.S. have no duty to protect any individual, only to enforce rule of law. This is despite the motto of many police departments in the U.S. being a variation of "protect and serve"; regardless, many departments generally expect their officers to protect individuals. The first case to make such a ruling was South v. State of Maryland in 1855, and the most recent was Town of Castle Rock v. Gonzales in 2005.

In contrast, the police are entitled to protect private rights in some jurisdictions. To ensure that the police would not interfere in the regular competencies of the courts of law, some police acts require that the police may only interfere in such cases where protection from courts cannot be obtained in time, and where, without interference of the police, the realization of the private right would be impeded. This would, for example, allow police to establish a restaurant guest's identity and forward it to the innkeeper in a case where the guest cannot pay the bill at nighttime because his wallet had just been stolen from the restaurant table.

In addition, there are federal law enforcement agencies in the United States whose mission includes providing protection for executives such as the president and accompanying family members, visiting foreign dignitaries, and other high-ranking individuals. Such agencies include the U.S. Secret Service and the U.S. Park Police.

== History ==
=== Ancient ===
==== China ====
Law enforcement in ancient China was carried out by "prefects" for thousands of years since it developed in both the Chu and Jin kingdoms of the Spring and Autumn period. In Jin, dozens of prefects were spread across the state, each having limited authority and employment period. They were appointed by local magistrates, who reported to higher authorities such as governors, who in turn were appointed by the emperor, and they oversaw the civil administration of their "prefecture", or jurisdiction. Under each prefect were "subprefects" who helped collectively with law enforcement in the area. Some prefects were responsible for handling investigations, much like modern police detectives. Prefects could also be women. Local citizens could report minor judicial offenses against them such as robberies at a local prefectural office. The concept of the "prefecture system" spread to other cultures such as Korea and Japan.

==== Babylonia ====
In Babylonia, law enforcement tasks were initially entrusted to individuals with military backgrounds or imperial magnates during the Old Babylonian period, but eventually, law enforcement was delegated to officers known as paqūdus, who were present in both cities and rural settlements. A paqūdu was responsible for investigating petty crimes and carrying out arrests.

==== Egypt ====
In ancient Egypt evidence of law enforcement exists as far back as the Old Kingdom period. There are records of an office known as "Judge Commandant of the Police" dating to the fourth dynasty. During the fifth dynasty at the end of the Old Kingdom period, warriors armed with wooden sticks were tasked with guarding public places such as markets, temples, and parks, and apprehending criminals. They are known to have made use of trained monkeys, baboons, and dogs in guard duties and catching criminals. After the Old Kingdom collapsed, ushering in the First Intermediate Period, it is thought that the same model applied. During this period, Bedouins were hired to guard the borders and protect trade caravans. During the Middle Kingdom period, a professional police force was created with a specific focus on enforcing the law, as opposed to the previous informal arrangement of using warriors as police. The police force was further reformed during the New Kingdom period. Officers served as interrogators, prosecutors, and court bailiffs, and were responsible for administering punishments handed down by judges. In addition, there were special units of officers trained as priests who were responsible for guarding temples and tombs and preventing inappropriate behavior at festivals or improper observation of religious rites during services. Other units were tasked with guarding caravans, guarding border crossings, protecting royal necropolises, guarding slaves at work or during transport, patrolling the Nile River, and guarding administrative buildings. By the Eighteenth Dynasty of the New Kingdom period, an elite desert-ranger police force called the Medjay was used to protect valuable areas, especially areas of pharaonic interest like capital cities, royal cemeteries, and the borders of Egypt. Though they are best known for their protection of the royal palaces and tombs in Thebes and the surrounding areas, the Medjay were used throughout Upper and Lower Egypt. Each regional unit had its own captain. The police forces of ancient Egypt did not guard rural communities, which often took care of their own judicial problems by appealing to village elders, but many of them had a constable to enforce state laws.

==== Greece ====
In ancient Greece, publicly owned slaves were used by magistrates as police. In Athens, the Scythian Archers (the ῥαβδοῦχοι 'rod-bearers'), a group of about 300 Scythian slaves, was used to guard public meetings to keep order and for crowd control, and also assisted with dealing with criminals, handling prisoners, and making arrests. Other duties associated with modern policing, such as investigating crimes, were left to the citizens themselves. Athenian police forces were supervised by the Areopagus. In Sparta, the Ephors were in charge of maintaining public order as judges, and they used Sparta's Hippeis, or royal guard, as their enforcers. There were separate authorities supervising women, children, and agricultural issues. Sparta also had a secret police force called the crypteia to watch the large population of helots, or slaves.

==== Rome ====
In the Roman Empire, the army played a major role in providing security. Roman soldiers detached from their legions and posted among civilians carried out law enforcement tasks. The Praetorian Guard, an elite army unit which was primarily an Imperial bodyguard and intelligence-gathering unit, could also act as a riot police force if required. Local watchmen were hired by cities to provide some extra security. Lictors, civil servants whose primary duty was to act as bodyguards to magistrates who held imperium, could carry out arrests and inflict punishments at their magistrate's command. Magistrates such as tresviri capitales, procurators fiscal and quaestors investigated crimes. There was no concept of public prosecution, so victims of crime or their families had to organize and manage the prosecution themselves. Under the reign of Augustus, when the capital had grown to almost one million inhabitants, 14 wards were created; the wards were protected by seven squads of 1,000 men called vigiles, who acted as night watchmen and firemen. In addition to firefighting, their duties included apprehending petty criminals, capturing runaway slaves, guarding the baths at night, and stopping disturbances of the peace. As well as the city of Rome, vigiles were also stationed in the harbor cities of Ostia and Portus. Augustus also formed the Urban Cohorts to deal with gangs and civil disturbances in the city of Rome, and as a counterbalance to the Praetorian Guard's enormous power in the city. They were led by the urban prefect. Urban Cohort units were later formed in Roman Carthage and Lugdunum.

In Rome, there also existed representatives of the common people who were called tribunes. It was their job to intercede on behalf of any common person who had been mistreated or wrongly arrested by the magistrates or other authorities. The tribunes could not themselves be arrested or mistreated as they were considered to be sacrosanct. They were therefore in a unique position to be able to protect and represent the common people without fear of political correctness, wrongful arrest or other forms of persecution. They thereby acted as a check against excessive state authority and the repression which can arise from the misuse of the powers of arrest and judicial punishment.

==== India ====
Law enforcement systems existed in the various kingdoms and empires of ancient India. The Apastamba Dharmasutra prescribes that kings should appoint officers and subordinates in the towns and villages to protect their subjects from crime. Various inscriptions and literature from ancient India suggest that a variety of roles existed for law enforcement officials such as those of a constable, thief catcher, watchman, and detective. In ancient India up to medieval and early modern times, kotwals were in charge of local law enforcement.

==== Achaemenid (First Persian) Empire ====
The Achaemenid Empire had well-organized police forces. A police force existed in every place of importance. In the cities, each ward was under the command of a Superintendent of Police, known as a Kuipan. Officers also acted as prosecutors and carried out punishments imposed by the courts. They were required to know the court procedure for prosecuting cases and advancing accusations.

==== Israel ====
In ancient Israel and Judah, officials with the responsibility of making declarations to the people, guarding the king's person, supervising public works, and executing the orders of the courts existed in the urban areas. They are repeatedly mentioned in the Hebrew Bible, and this system lasted into the period of Roman rule. The first century Jewish historian Josephus related that every judge had two such officers under his command. Levites were preferred for this role. Cities and towns also had night watchmen. Besides officers of the town, there were officers for every tribe. The temple in Jerusalem was protected by a special temple guard. The Talmud mentions various local officials in the Jewish communities of the Land of Israel and Babylon who supervised economic activity. Their Greek-sounding titles suggest that the roles were introduced under Hellenic influence. Most of these officials received their authority from local courts and their salaries were drawn from the town treasury. The Talmud also mentions city watchmen and mounted and armed watchmen in the suburbs.

==== Africa ====
In many regions of pre-colonial Africa, particularly West and Central Africa, guild-like secret societies emerged as law enforcement. In the absence of a court system or written legal code, they carried out police-like activities, employing varying degrees of coercion to enforce conformity and deter antisocial behavior. In ancient Ethiopia, armed retainers of the nobility enforced law in the countryside according to the will of their leaders. The Songhai Empire had officials known as assara-munidios, or "enforcers", acting as police.

==== The Americas ====
Pre-Columbian civilizations in the Americas also had organized law enforcement. The city-states of the Maya civilization had constables known as tupils. In the Aztec Empire, judges had officers serving under them who were empowered to perform arrests, even of dignitaries. Aztec markets were patrolled by commissioners to prevent fraud and disorder. In the Inca Empire, officials called kuraka enforced the law among the households they were assigned to oversee, with inspectors known as tokoyrikoq (lit. 'he who sees all') also stationed throughout the provinces to keep order.

=== Post-classical ===
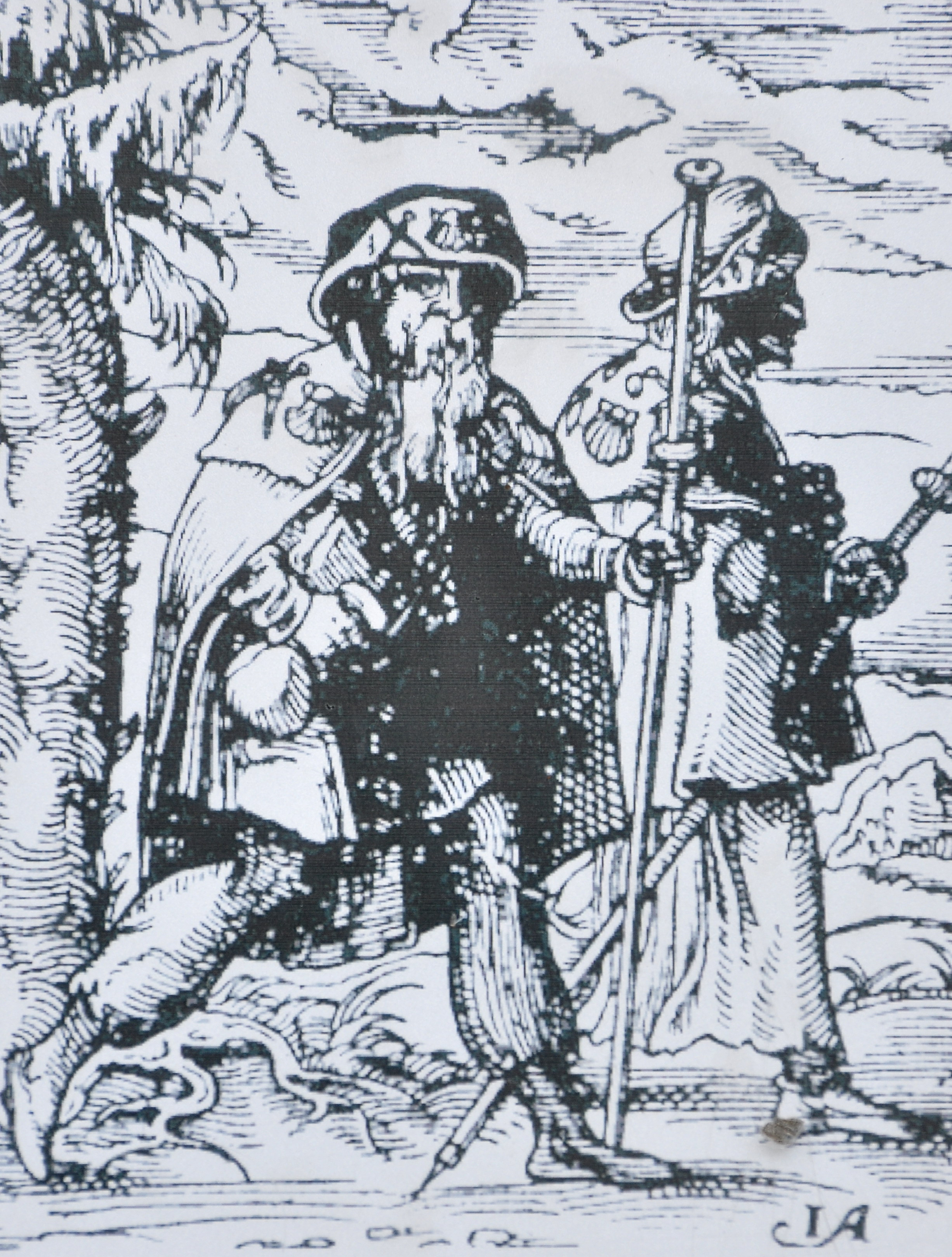
The Santas Hermandades of medieval Spain were formed to protect pilgrims on the Camino de Santiago.

In medieval Spain, Santas Hermandades, or 'holy brotherhoods', peacekeeping associations of armed individuals, were a characteristic of municipal life, especially in Castile. As medieval Spanish kings often could not offer adequate protection, protective municipal leagues began to emerge in the twelfth century against banditry and other rural criminals, and against the lawless nobility or to support one or another claimant to a crown.

These organizations were intended to be temporary, but became a long-standing fixture of Spain. The first recorded case of the formation of an hermandad occurred when the towns and the peasantry of the north united to police the pilgrim road to Santiago de Compostela in Galicia, and protect the pilgrims against robber knights.

Throughout the Middle Ages such alliances were frequently formed by combinations of towns to protect the roads connecting them, and were occasionally extended to political purposes. Among the most powerful was the league of North Castilian and Basque ports, the Hermandad de las marismas: Toledo, Talavera, and Villarreal.

As one of their first acts after end of the War of the Castilian Succession in 1479, Ferdinand II of Aragon and Isabella I of Castile established the centrally-organized and efficient Holy Brotherhood as a national police force. They adapted an existing brotherhood to the purpose of a general police acting under officials appointed by themselves, and endowed with great powers of summary jurisdiction even in capital cases. The original brotherhoods continued to serve as modest local police-units until their final suppression in 1835.

The Vehmic courts of Germany provided some policing in the absence of strong state institutions. Such courts had a chairman who presided over a session and lay judges who passed judgement and carried out law enforcement tasks. Among the responsibilities that lay judges had were giving formal warnings to known troublemakers, issuing warrants, and carrying out executions.

In the medieval Islamic Caliphates, police were known as Shurta. Bodies termed Shurta existed perhaps as early as the Rashidun Caliphate during the reign of Uthman. The Shurta is known to have existed in the Abbasid and Umayyad Caliphates. Their primary roles were to act as police and internal security forces but they could also be used for other duties such as customs and tax enforcement, rubbish collection, and acting as bodyguards for governors. From the 10th century, the importance of the Shurta declined as the army assumed internal security tasks while cities became more autonomous and handled their own policing needs locally, such as by hiring watchmen. In addition, officials called muhtasibs were responsible for supervising bazaars and economic activity in general in the medieval Islamic world.

In France during the Middle Ages, there were two Great Officers of the Crown of France with police responsibilities: The Marshal of France and the Grand Constable of France. The military policing responsibilities of the Marshal of France were delegated to the Marshal's provost, whose force was known as the Marshalcy because its authority ultimately derived from the Marshal. The marshalcy dates back to the Hundred Years' War, and some historians trace it back to the early 12th century. Another organisation, the Constabulary (Old French: Connétablie), was under the command of the Constable of France. The constabulary was regularised as a military body in 1337. Under Francis I (reigned 1515–1547), the Maréchaussée was merged with the constabulary. The resulting force was also known as the Maréchaussée, or, formally, the Constabulary and Marshalcy of France.

In late medieval Italian cities, police forces were known as berovierri. Individually, their members were known as birri. Subordinate to the city's podestà, the berovierri were responsible for guarding the cities and their suburbs, patrolling, and the pursuit and arrest of criminals. They were typically hired on short-term contracts, usually six months. Detailed records from medieval Bologna show that birri had a chain of command, with constables and sergeants managing lower-ranking birri, that they wore uniforms, that they were housed together with other employees of the podestà together with a number of servants including cooks and stable-keepers, that their parentage and places of origin were meticulously recorded, and that most were not native to Bologna, with many coming from outside Italy.

The English system of maintaining public order since the Norman conquest was a private system of tithings known as the mutual pledge system. This system was introduced under Alfred the Great. Communities were divided into groups of ten families called tithings, each of which was overseen by a chief tithingman. Every household head was responsible for the good behavior of his own family and the good behavior of other members of his tithing. Every male aged 12 and over was required to participate in a tithing. Members of tithings were responsible for raising "hue and cry" upon witnessing or learning of a crime, and the men of his tithing were responsible for capturing the criminal. The person the tithing captured would then be brought before the chief tithingman, who would determine guilt or innocence and punishment. All members of the criminal's tithing would be responsible for paying the fine. A group of ten tithings was known as a "hundred" and every hundred was overseen by an official known as a reeve. Hundreds ensured that if a criminal escaped to a neighboring village, he could be captured and returned to his village. If a criminal was not apprehended, then the entire hundred could be fined. The hundreds were governed by administrative divisions known as shires, the rough equivalent of a modern county, which were overseen by an official known as a shire-reeve, from which the term sheriff evolved. The shire-reeve had the power of posse comitatus, meaning he could gather the men of his shire to pursue a criminal. Following the Norman conquest of England in 1066, the tithing system was tightened with the frankpledge system. By the end of the 13th century, the office of constable developed. Constables had the same responsibilities as chief tithingmen and additionally as royal officers. The constable was elected by his parish every year. Eventually, constables became the first "police" official to be tax-supported. In urban areas, watchmen were tasked with keeping order and enforcing nighttime curfew. Watchmen guarded the town gates at night, patrolled the streets, arrested those on the streets at night without good reason, and also acted as firefighters. Eventually the office of justice of the peace was established, with a justice of the peace overseeing constables. There was also a system of investigative "juries".

The Assize of Arms of 1252, which required the appointment of constables to summon men to arms, quell breaches of the peace, and to deliver offenders to the sheriff or reeve, is cited as one of the earliest antecedents of the English police. The Statute of Winchester of 1285 is also cited as the primary legislation regulating the policing of the country between the Norman Conquest and the Metropolitan Police Act 1829.

From about 1500, private watchmen were funded by private individuals and organisations to carry out police functions. They were later nicknamed 'Charlies', probably after the reigning monarch King Charles II. Thief-takers were also rewarded for catching thieves and returning the stolen property. They were private individuals usually hired by crime victims.

The earliest English use of the word police seems to have been the term Polles mentioned in the book The Second Part of the Institutes of the Lawes of England published in 1642.

=== Early modern ===
The first example of a statutory police force in the world was probably the High Constables of Edinburgh, formed in 1611 to police the streets of Edinburgh, then part of the Kingdom of Scotland. The constables, of whom half were merchants and half were craftsmen, were charged with enforcing 16 regulations relating to curfews, weapons, and theft. At that time, maintenance of public order in Scotland was mainly done by clan chiefs and feudal lords. The first centrally organised and uniformed police force was created by the government of King Louis XIV in 1667 to police the city of Paris, then the largest city in Europe. The royal edict, registered by the Parlement of Paris on 15 March 1667, created the office of lieutenant général de police ("lieutenant general of police"), who was to be the head of the new Paris police force, and defined the task of the police as "ensuring the peace and quiet of the public and of private individuals, purging the city of what may cause disturbances, procuring abundance, and having each and everyone live according to their station and their duties".

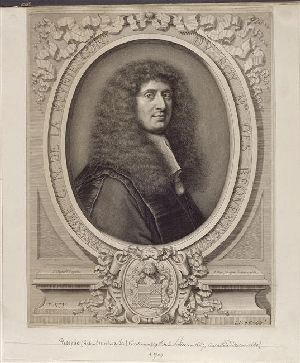
Gabriel Nicolas de la Reynie, founder of the Prefecture of Police, the first uniformed police force in the world

This office was first held by Gabriel Nicolas de la Reynie, who had 44 commissaires de police ('police commissioners') under his authority. In 1709, these commissioners were assisted by inspecteurs de police ('police inspectors'). The city of Paris was divided into 16 districts policed by the commissaires, each assigned to a particular district and assisted by a growing bureaucracy. The scheme of the Paris police force was extended to the rest of France by a royal edict of October 1699, resulting in the creation of lieutenants general of police in all large French cities and towns.

After the French Revolution, Napoleon I reorganized the police in Paris and other cities with more than 5,000 inhabitants on 17 February 1800, as the Prefecture of Police. On 12 March 1829, a government decree created the first uniformed police in France, known as sergents de ville ('city sergeants'), which the Paris Prefecture of Police's website claims were the first uniformed policemen in the world.

In feudal Japan, samurai warriors were charged with enforcing the law among commoners. Some Samurai acted as magistrates called Machi-bugyō, who acted as judges, prosecutors, and as chief of police. Beneath them were other Samurai serving as yoriki, or assistant magistrates, who conducted criminal investigations, and beneath them were Samurai serving as dōshin, who were responsible for patrolling the streets, keeping the peace, and making arrests when necessary. The yoriki were responsible for managing the dōshin. Yoriki and dōshin were typically drawn from low-ranking samurai families. Assisting the dōshin were the komono, non-Samurai chōnin who went on patrol with them and provided assistance, the okappiki, non-Samurai from the lowest outcast class, often former criminals, who worked for them as informers and spies, and gōyokiki or meakashi, chōnin, often former criminals, who were hired by local residents and merchants to work as police assistants in a particular neighborhood. This system typically did not apply to the Samurai themselves. Samurai clans were expected to resolve disputes among each other through negotiation, or when that failed through duels. Only rarely did Samurai bring their disputes to a magistrate or answer to police.

In Joseon-era Korea, the Podocheong emerged as a police force with the power to arrest and punish criminals. Established in 1469 as a temporary organization, its role solidified into a permanent one.

In Sweden, local governments were responsible for law and order by way of a royal decree issued by King Magnus Ladulås in the 13th century. The cities financed and organized groups of watchmen who patrolled the streets. In the late 1500s in Stockholm, patrol duties were in large part taken over by a special corps of salaried city guards. The city guard was organized, uniformed and armed like a military unit and was responsible for interventions against various crimes and the arrest of suspected criminals. These guards were assisted by the military, fire patrolmen, and a civilian unit that did not wear a uniform, but instead wore a small badge around the neck. The civilian unit monitored compliance with city ordinances relating to e.g. sanitation issues, traffic and taxes. In rural areas, the King's bailiffs were responsible for law and order until the establishment of counties in the 1630s.

Up to the early 18th century, the level of state involvement in law enforcement in Britain was low. Although some law enforcement officials existed in the form of parish constables and watchmen, there was no organized police force. A professional police force like the one already present in France would have been ill-suited to Britain, which saw examples such as the French one as a threat to the people's liberty and balanced constitution in favor of an arbitrary and tyrannical government. Law enforcement was mostly up to the private citizens, who had the right and duty to prosecute crimes in which they were involved or in which they were not. At the cry of 'murder!' or 'stop thief!' everyone was entitled and obliged to join the pursuit. Once the criminal had been apprehended, the parish constables and night watchmen, who were the only public figures provided by the state and who were typically part-time and local, would make the arrest. As a result, the state set a reward to encourage citizens to arrest and prosecute offenders. The first of such rewards was established in 1692 of the amount of £40 for the conviction of a highwayman and in the following years it was extended to burglars, coiners and other forms of offense. The reward was to be increased in 1720 when, after the end of the War of the Spanish Succession and the consequent rise of criminal offenses, the government offered £100 for the conviction of a highwayman. Although the offer of such a reward was conceived as an incentive for the victims of an offense to proceed to the prosecution and to bring criminals to justice, the efforts of the government also increased the number of private thief-takers. Thief-takers became infamously known not so much for what they were supposed to do, catching real criminals and prosecuting them, as for "setting themselves up as intermediaries between victims and their attackers, extracting payments for the return of stolen goods and using the threat of prosecution to keep offenders in thrall". Some of them, such as Jonathan Wild, became infamous at the time for staging robberies in order to receive the reward.

In 1737, George II began paying some London and Middlesex watchmen with tax monies, beginning the shift to government control. In 1749, Judge Henry Fielding began organizing a force of quasi-professional constables known as the Bow Street Runners. The Bow Street Runners are considered to have been Britain's first dedicated police force. They represented a formalization and regularization of existing policing methods, similar to the unofficial 'thief-takers'. What made them different was their formal attachment to the Bow Street magistrates' office, and payment by the magistrate with funds from the central government. They worked out of Fielding's office and court at No. 4 Bow Street, and did not patrol but served writs and arrested offenders on the authority of the magistrates, travelling nationwide to apprehend criminals. Fielding wanted to regulate and legalize law enforcement activities due to the high rate of corruption and mistaken or malicious arrests seen with the system that depended mainly on private citizens and state rewards for law enforcement. Henry Fielding's work was carried on by his brother, Justice John Fielding, who succeeded him as magistrate in the Bow Street office. Under John Fielding, the institution of the Bow Street Runners gained more and more recognition from the government, although the force was only funded intermittently in the years that followed. In 1763, the Bow Street Horse Patrol was established to combat highway robbery, funded by a government grant. The Bow Street Runners served as the guiding principle for the way that policing developed over the next 80 years. Bow Street was a manifestation of the move towards increasing professionalisation and state control of street life, beginning in London.

The Macdaniel affair, a 1754 British political scandal in which a group of thief-takers was found to be falsely prosecuting innocent men in order to collect reward money from bounties, added further impetus for a publicly salaried police force that did not depend on rewards. Nonetheless, In 1828, there were privately financed police units in no fewer than 45 parishes within a 10-mile radius of London.

The word police was borrowed from French into the English language in the 18th century, but for a long time it applied only to French and continental European police forces. The word, and the concept of police itself, were "disliked as a symbol of foreign oppression". Before the 19th century, the first use of the word police recorded in government documents in the United Kingdom was the appointment of Commissioners of Police for Scotland in 1714 and the creation of the Marine Police in 1798.

=== Modern ===
Policing of cities in Europe developed in Glasgow, Dublin and London as a response to unrest and crises. From the mid-1700s, poor harvests and food rioting precipitated a series of policing reforms in the Irish Parliament. In the 1800s, further unrest and changes in popular notions of social obligations in growing urban populations led to a series of new police reforms in Great Britain. These spread to its former and current dominions in North America, Australia and elsewhere, where urban police forces adopted similar founding principles, structures, regulations and shared personnel.

==== Scotland and Ireland ====
Following early police forces established in 1779 and 1788 in Glasgow, Scotland, the Glasgow authorities successfully petitioned the government to pass the Glasgow Police Act establishing the City of Glasgow Police in 1800. Other Scottish towns soon followed suit and set up their own police forces through acts of parliament. In Ireland, the Irish Constabulary Act 1822 marked the beginning of the Royal Irish Constabulary. The act established a force in each barony with chief constables and inspectors general under the control of the civil administration at Dublin Castle. By 1841 this force numbered over 8,600 men.

==== London ====
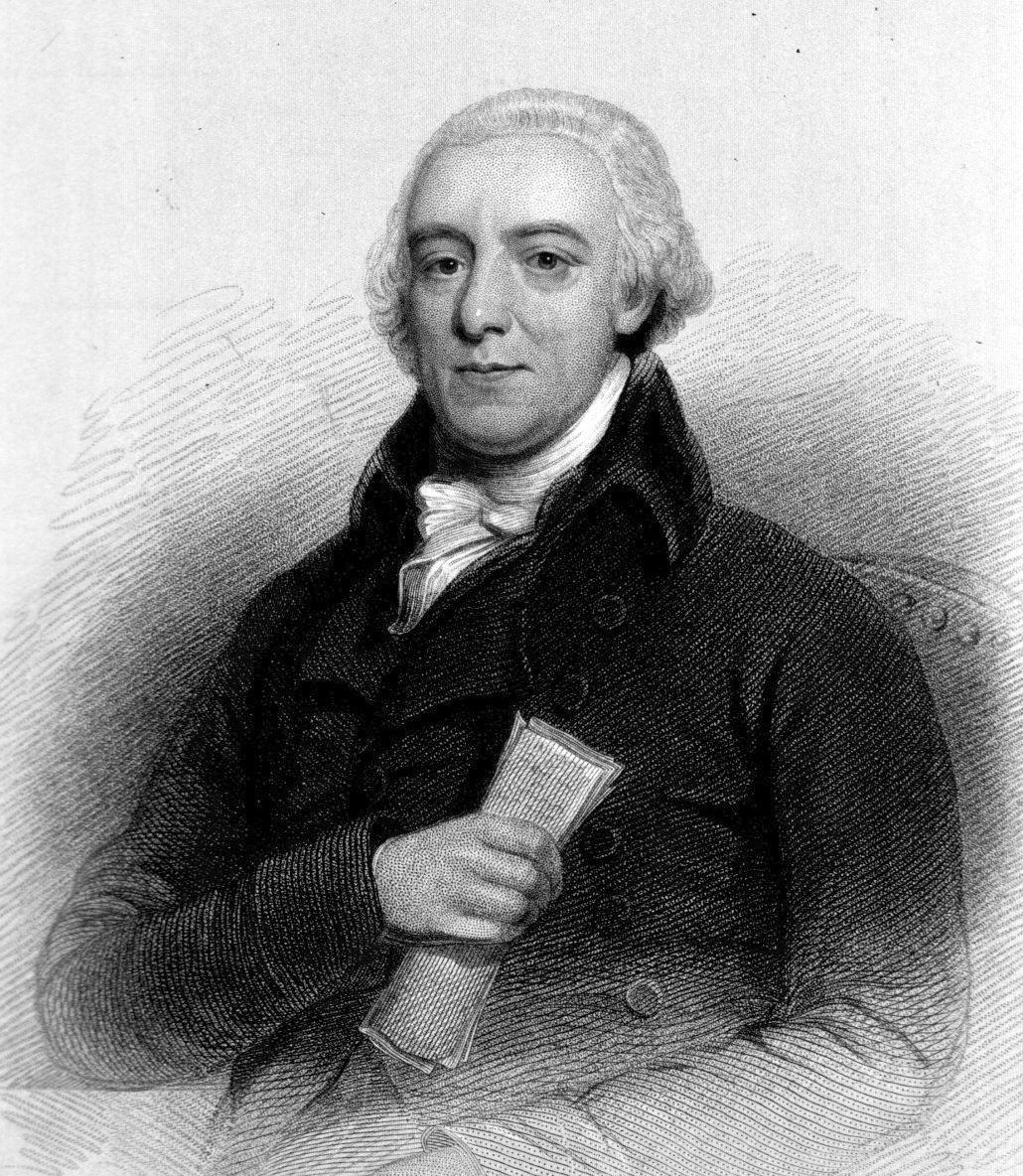
Patrick Colquhoun, founder of the Thames River Police

In 1797, Patrick Colquhoun was able to persuade the West Indies merchants who operated at the Pool of London on the River Thames to establish a police force at the docks to prevent rampant theft that was causing annual estimated losses of £500,000 worth of cargo in imports alone. The idea of a police, as it then existed in France, was considered as a potentially undesirable foreign import. In building the case for the police in the face of England's firm anti-police sentiment, Colquhoun framed the political rationale on economic indicators to show that a police dedicated to crime prevention was "perfectly congenial to the principle of the British constitution". Moreover, he went so far as to praise the French system, which had reached "the greatest degree of perfection" in his estimation.

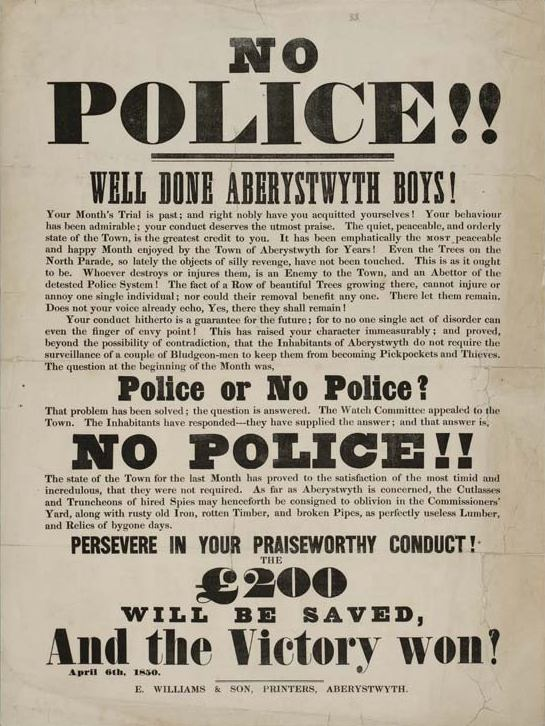
Poster against "detested" Police posted in the town of Aberystwyth, Wales, April 1850

With the initial investment of £4,200, the new force, the Marine Police, was formed in 1798, composed of about 50 men charged with policing 33,000 workers in the river trades, of whom Colquhoun claimed 11,000 were known criminals and "on the game". The force was part funded by the London Society of West India Planters and Merchants. The force was a success after its first year, and his men had "established their worth by saving £122,000 worth of cargo and by the rescuing of several lives". Word of this success spread quickly, and the government passed the Depredations on the Thames Act 1800 on 28 July 1800, establishing a fully funded police force, the Thames River Police, together with new laws including police powers. Colquhoun published a book on the experiment, The Commerce and Policing of the River Thames. It found receptive audiences far outside London, and inspired similar forces in other cities, notably, New York City, Dublin, and Sydney.

Colquhoun's utilitarian approach to the problem – using a cost-benefit argument to obtain support from businesses standing to benefit – allowed him to achieve what Henry and John Fielding failed for their Bow Street Runners. Unlike the stipendiary system at Bow Street, the river police were full-time, salaried officers prohibited from taking private fees. His other contribution was the concept of preventive policing; his police were to act as a highly visible deterrent to crime by their permanent presence on the Thames.

==== Metropolitan ====
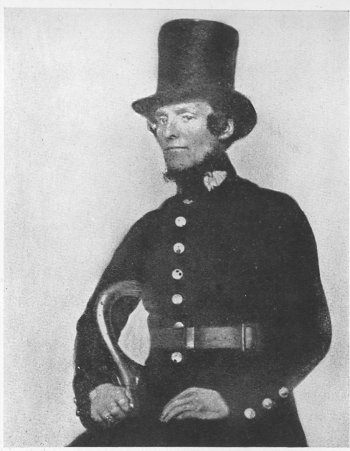
An officer of the Metropolitan Police Service in the 1850s

London was fast reaching a size unprecedented in world history, due to the onset of the Industrial Revolution. It became clear that the locally maintained system of volunteer constables and "watchmen" was ineffective, both in detecting and preventing crime. A parliamentary committee was appointed to investigate the system of policing in London. Upon Sir Robert Peel being appointed as Home Secretary in 1822, he established a second and more effective committee, and acted upon its findings.

Royal assent to the Metropolitan Police Act 1829 was given and the Metropolitan Police Service was established on 29 September 1829, in London. Peel, widely regarded as the father of modern policing, was heavily influenced by the social and legal philosophy of Jeremy Bentham, who called for a strong and centralised, but politically neutral, police force for the maintenance of social order, for the protection of people from crime and to act as a visible deterrent to urban crime and disorder. Peel decided to standardise the police force as an official paid profession, to organise it in a civilian fashion, and to make it answerable to the public.

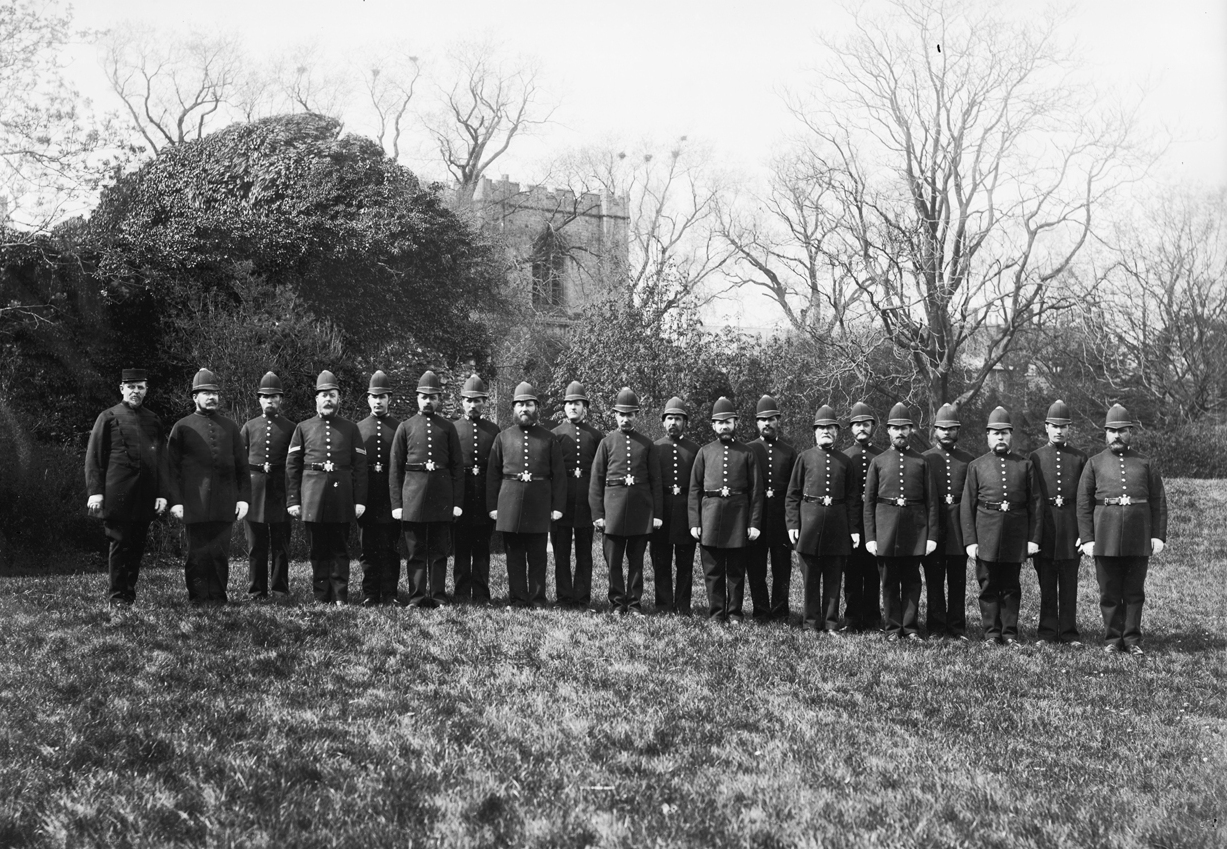
Group portrait of policemen, Bury St Edmunds, Suffolk, England, c. 1900

Due to public fears concerning the deployment of the military in domestic matters, Peel organised the force along civilian lines, rather than paramilitary. To appear neutral, the uniform was deliberately manufactured in blue, rather than red which was then a military colour, along with the officers being armed only with a wooden truncheon and a rattle to signal the need for assistance. Along with this, police ranks did not include military titles, with the exception of Sergeant.

To distance the new police force from the initial public view of it as a new tool of government repression, Peel publicised the so-called Peelian principles, which set down basic guidelines for ethical policing:

- Whether the police are effective is not measured on the number of arrests but on the deterrence of crime.
- Above all else, an effective authority figure knows trust and accountability are paramount. Hence, Peel's most often quoted principle that "The police are the public and the public are the police."

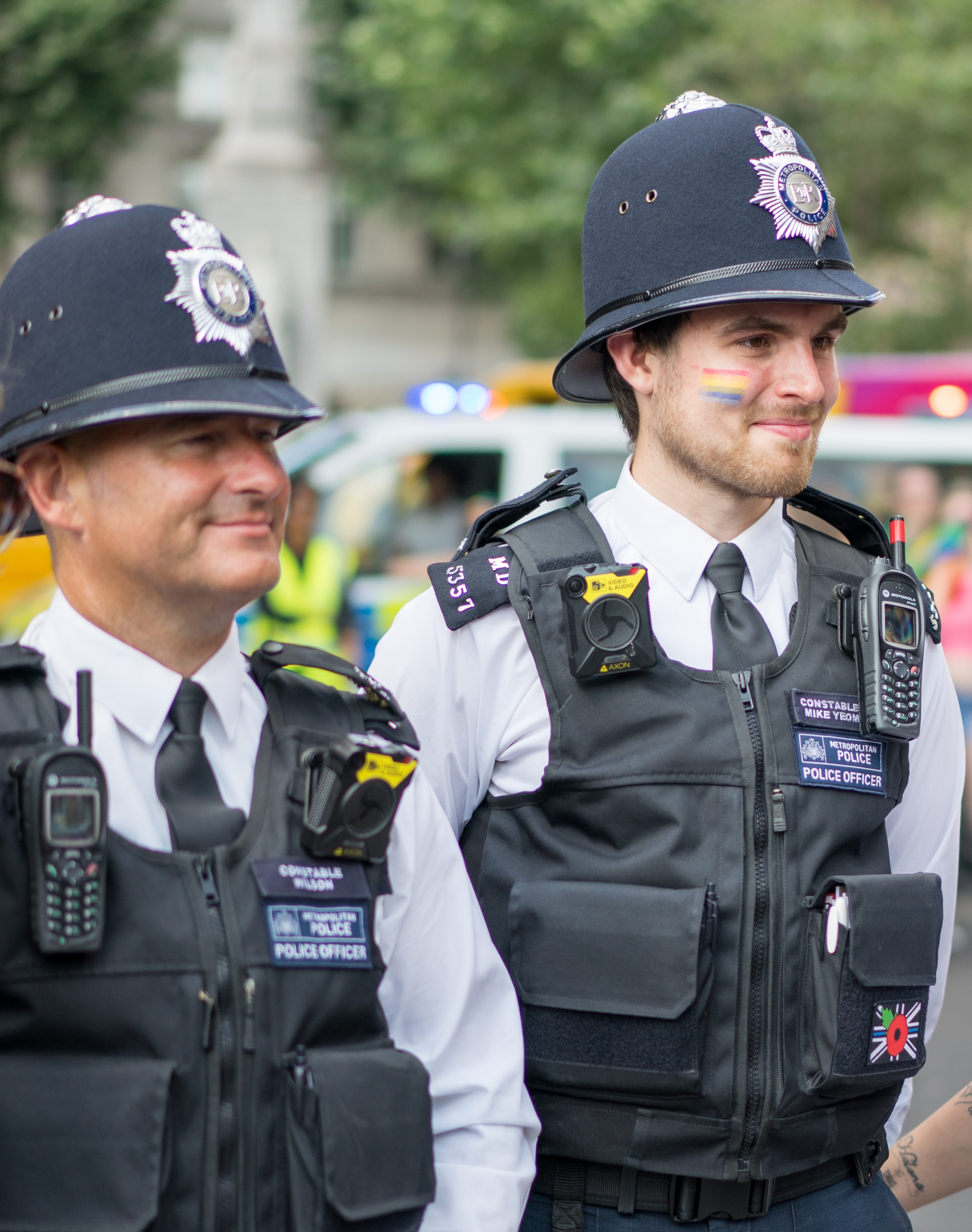
Metropolitan Police officers in 2019. The custodian helmet has been called "an iconic symbol of British policing".

The Metropolitan Police Act 1829 created a modern police force by limiting the purview of the force and its powers and envisioning it as merely an organ of the judicial system. Their job was apolitical; to maintain the peace and apprehend criminals for the courts to process according to the law. This was very different from the "continental model" of the police force that had been developed in France, where the police force worked within the parameters of the absolutist state as an extension of the authority of the monarch and functioned as part of the governing state.

In 1863, the Metropolitan Police were issued with the distinctive custodian helmet, and in 1884 they switched to the use of whistles that could be heard from much further away. The Metropolitan Police became a model for the police forces in many countries, including the United States and most of the British Empire. Bobbies can still be found in many parts of the Commonwealth of Nations.

==== Australia ====
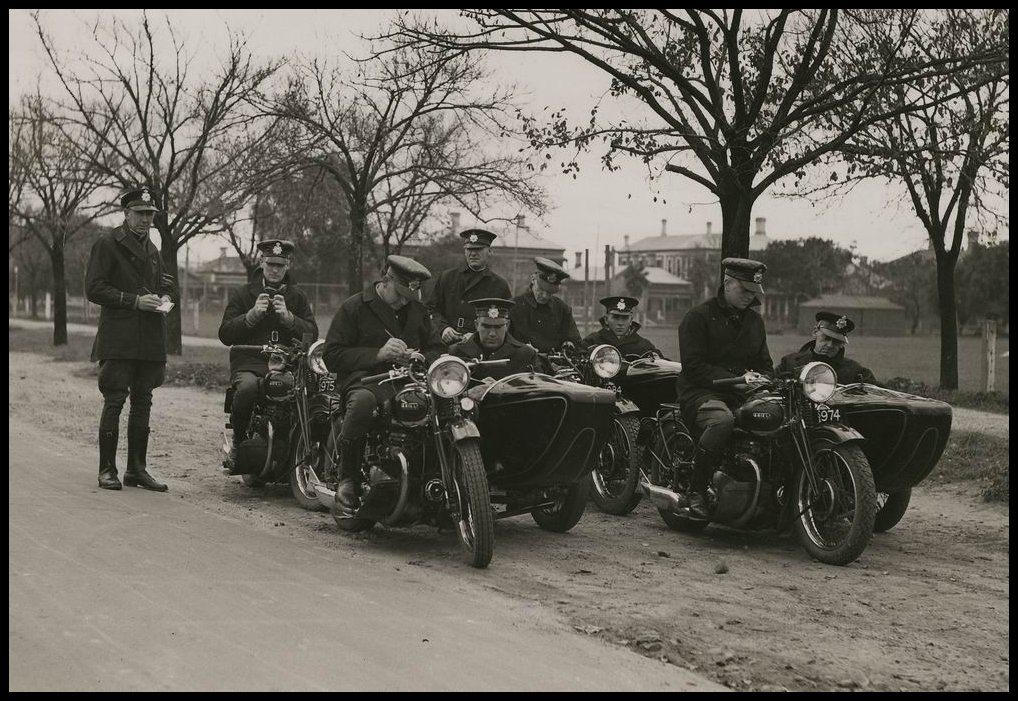
South Australia Police officers on police motorcycles with sidecars in 1938

In Australia, organized law enforcement emerged soon after British colonization began in 1788. The first law enforcement organizations were the Night Watch and Row Boat Guard, which were formed in 1789 to police Sydney. Their ranks were drawn from well-behaved convicts deported to Australia. The Night Watch was replaced by the Sydney Foot Police in 1790. In New South Wales, rural law enforcement officials were appointed by local justices of the peace during the early to mid-19th century and were referred to as "bench police" or "benchers". A mounted police force was formed in 1825.

The first police force having centralised command as well as jurisdiction over an entire colony was the South Australia Police, formed in 1838 under Henry Inman. However, whilst the New South Wales Police Force was established in 1862, it was made up from a large number of policing and military units operating within the then Colony of New South Wales and traces its links back to the Royal Marines. The passing of the Police Regulation Act of 1862 essentially tightly regulated and centralised all of the police forces operating throughout the Colony of New South Wales.

Each Australian state and territory maintain its own police force, while the Australian Federal Police enforces laws at the federal level. The New South Wales Police Force remains the largest police force in Australia in terms of personnel and physical resources. It is also the only police force that requires its recruits to undertake university studies at the recruit level and has the recruit pay for their own education.

==== Brazil ====
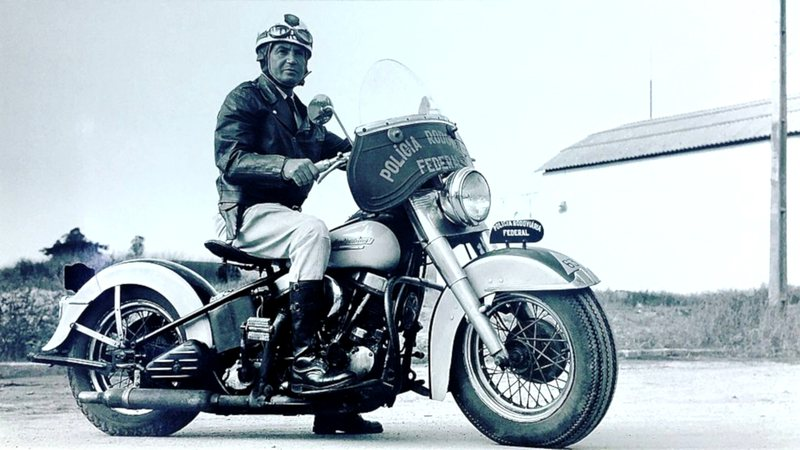
A Federal Highway Police motorcycle officer in 1935

In 1566, the first police investigator of Rio de Janeiro was recruited. By the 17th century, most captaincies already had local units with law enforcement functions. On 9 July 1775, a Cavalry Regiment was created in the state of Minas Gerais for maintaining law and order. In 1808, the Portuguese royal family relocated to Brazil, because of the French invasion of Portugal. King João VI established the Intendência Geral de Polícia ('General Police Intendancy') for investigations. He also created a Royal Police Guard for Rio de Janeiro in 1809. In 1831, after independence, each province started organizing its local "military police", with order maintenance tasks. The Federal Railroad Police was created in 1852, Federal Highway Police, was established in 1928, and Federal Police in 1967.

==== Canada ====
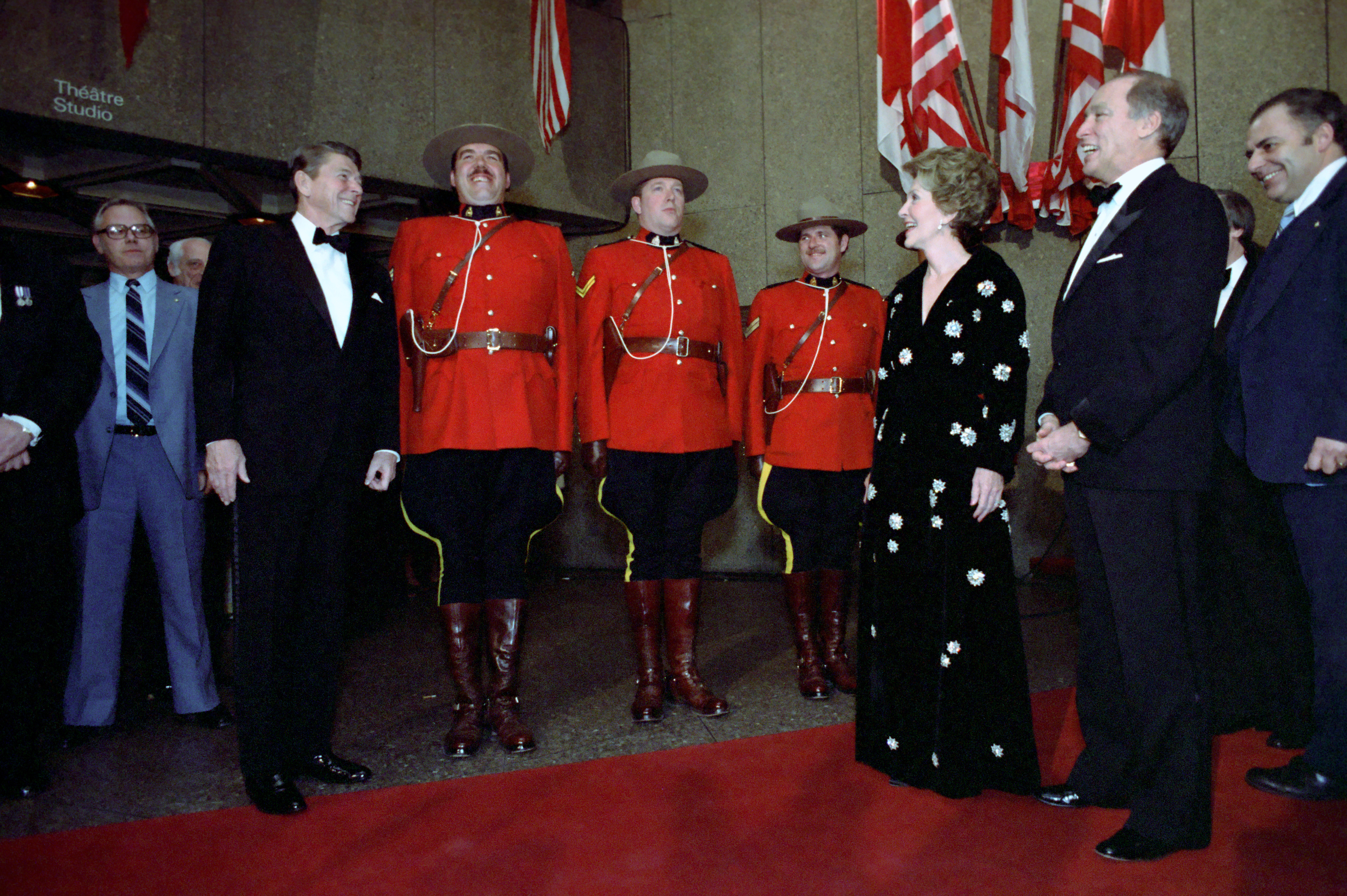
Royal Canadian Mounted Police officers present at a meeting between Ronald Reagan, Nancy Reagan, and Pierre Trudeau, 1981

During the early days of English and French colonization, municipalities hired watchmen and constables to provide security. Established in 1729, the Royal Newfoundland Constabulary (RNC) was the first policing service founded in Canada. The establishment of modern policing services in the Canadas occurred during the 1830s, modelling their services after the London Metropolitan Police, and adopting the ideas of the Peelian principles. The Toronto Police Service was established in 1834 as the first municipal police service in Canada. Prior to that, local able-bodied male citizens had been required to report for night watch duty as special constables for a fixed number of nights a year on penalty of a fine or imprisonment in a system known as "watch and ward." The Quebec City Police Service was established in 1840.

A national police service, the Dominion Police, was founded in 1868. Initially the Dominion Police provided security for parliament, but its responsibilities quickly grew. In 1870, Rupert's Land and the North-Western Territory were incorporated into the country. In an effort to police its newly acquired territory, the Canadian government established the North-West Mounted Police in 1873 (renamed Royal North-West Mounted Police in 1904). In 1920, the Dominion Police, and the Royal Northwest Mounted Police were amalgamated into the Royal Canadian Mounted Police (RCMP).

The RCMP provides federal law enforcement; and law enforcement in eight provinces, and all three territories. The provinces of Ontario, and Quebec maintain their own provincial police forces, the Ontario Provincial Police (OPP), and the Sûreté du Québec (SQ). Policing in Newfoundland and Labrador is provided by the RCMP, and the RNC. The aforementioned services also provide municipal policing, although larger Canadian municipalities may establish their own police service.

==== Lebanon ====
In Lebanon, the current police force was established in 1861, with creation of the Gendarmerie.

==== India ====
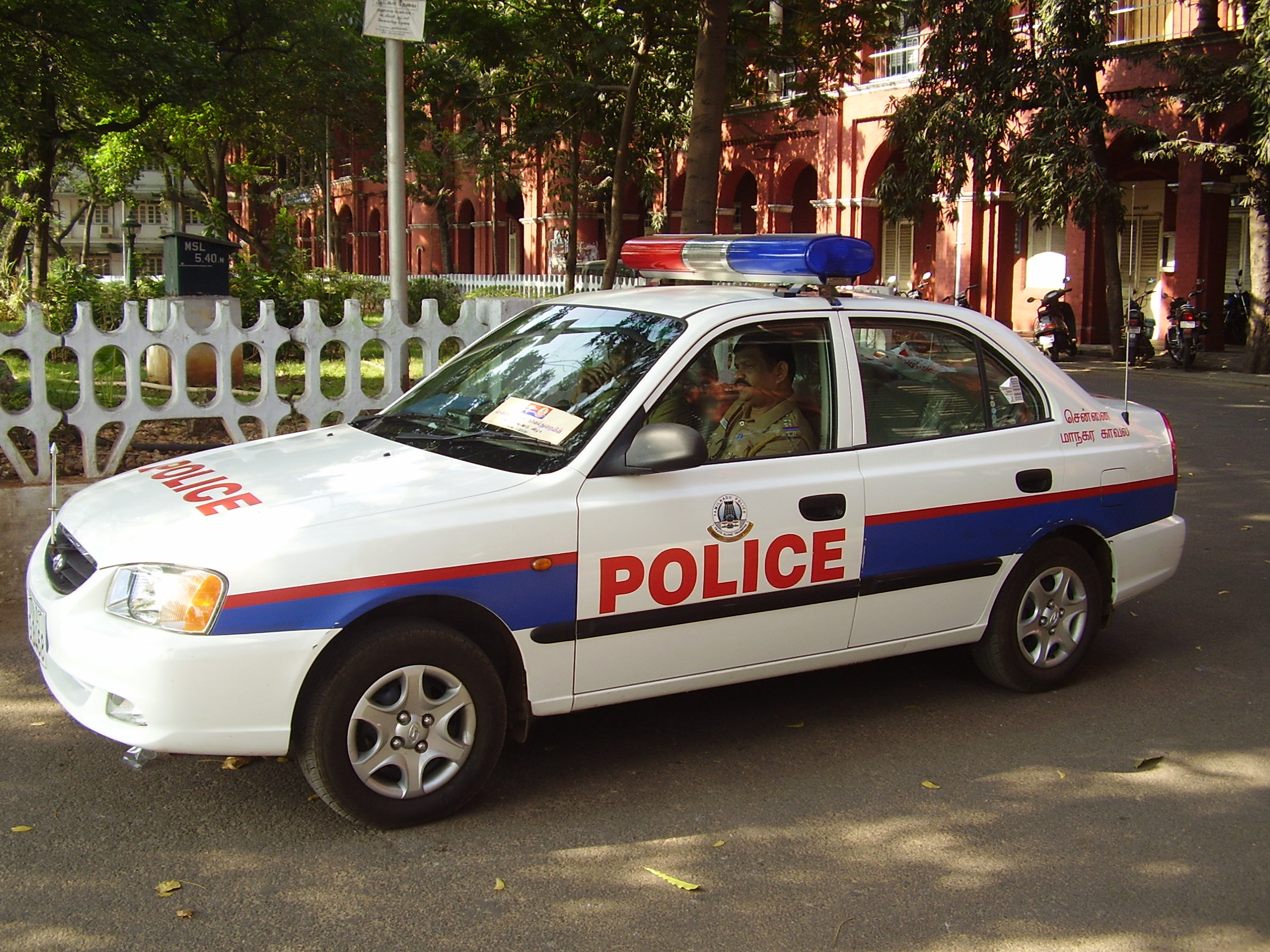
Greater Chennai Police officers patrolling in a police car in Chennai, India

Under the Mughal Empire, provincial governors called subahdars (or nazims), as well as officials known as faujdars and thanadars were tasked with keeping law and order. Kotwals were responsible for public order in urban areas. In addition, officials called amils, whose primary duties were tax collection, occasionally dealt with rebels. The system evolved under growing British influence that eventually culminated in the establishment of the British Raj. In 1770, the offices of faujdar and amil were abolished. They were brought back in 1774 by Warren Hastings, the first Governor of the Presidency of Fort William (Bengal). In 1791, the first permanent police force was established by Charles Cornwallis, the Commander-in-Chief of British India and Governor of the Presidency of Fort William.

A single police force was established after the formation of the British Raj with the Government of India Act 1858. A uniform police bureaucracy was formed under the Police Act 1861, which established the Superior Police Services. This later evolved into the Indian Imperial Police, which kept order until the Partition of India and independence in 1947. In 1948, the Indian Imperial Police was replaced by the Indian Police Service.

In modern India, the police are under the control of respective States and union territories and are known to be under State Police Services (SPS). The candidates selected for the SPS are usually posted as Deputy Superintendent of Police or Assistant Commissioner of Police once their probationary period ends. On prescribed satisfactory service in the SPS, the officers are nominated to the Indian Police Service. The service color is usually dark blue and red, while the uniform color is Khaki.

==== United States ====
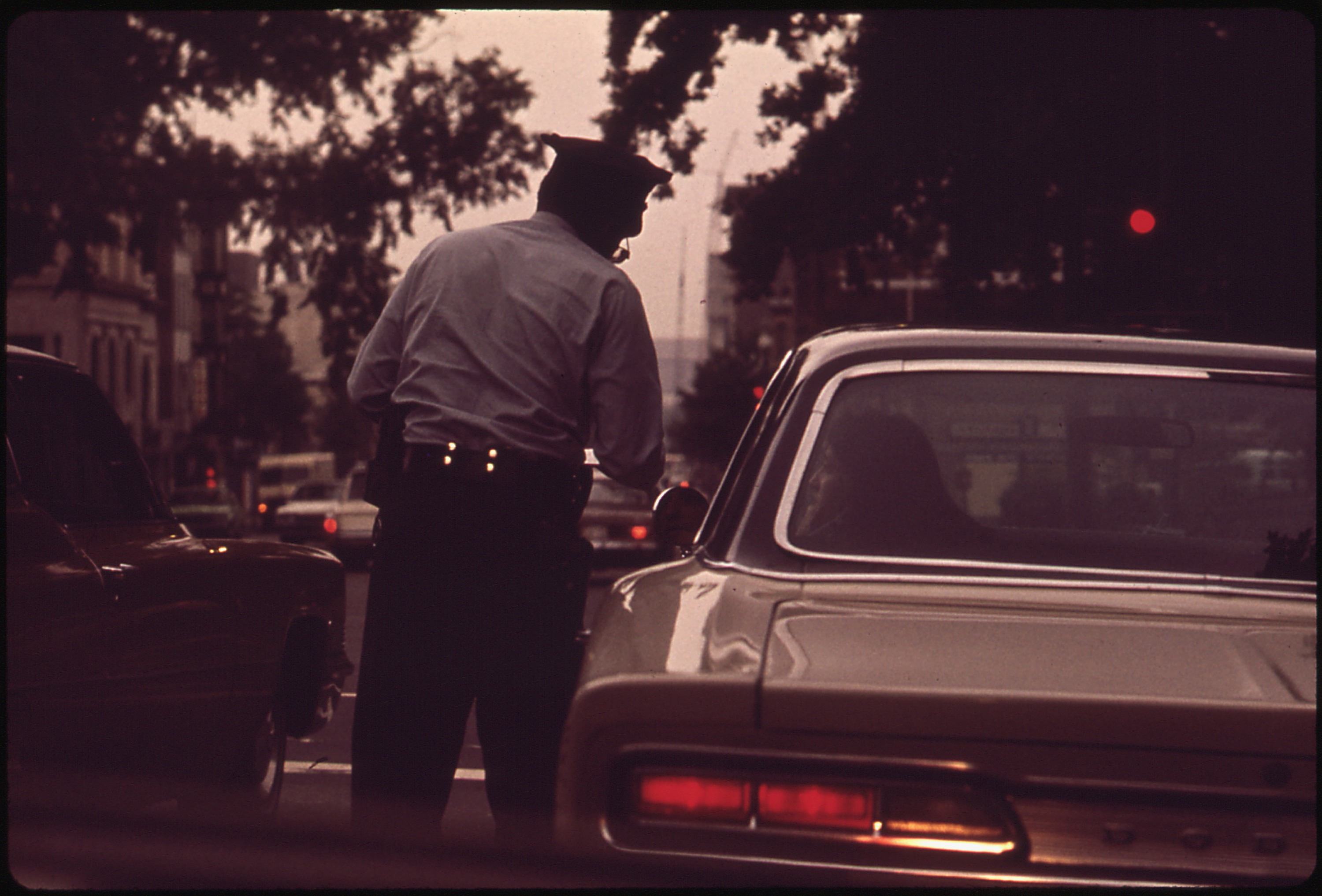
A Metropolitan Police Department of the District of Columbia officer ticketing a motorist for a traffic violation, 1973

In Colonial America, the county sheriff was the most important law enforcement official. For instance, the New York Sheriff's Office was founded in 1626, and the Albany County Sheriff's Department in the 1660s. The county sheriff, who was an elected official, was responsible for enforcing laws, collecting taxes, supervising elections, and handling the legal business of the county government. Sheriffs would investigate crimes and make arrests after citizens filed complaints or provided information about a crime but did not carry out patrols or otherwise take preventive action. Villages and cities typically hired constables and marshals, who were empowered to make arrests and serve warrants. Many municipalities also formed a night watch, a group of citizen volunteers who would patrol the streets at night looking for crime and fires. Typically, constables and marshals were the main law enforcement officials available during the day while the night watch would serve during the night. Eventually, municipalities formed day watch groups. Rioting was handled by local militias.

In the 1700s, the Province of Carolina (later North- and South Carolina) established slave patrols in order to prevent slave rebellions and enslaved people from escaping. By 1785 the Charleston Guard and Watch had "a distinct chain of command, uniforms, sole responsibility for policing, salary, authorized use of force, and a focus on preventing crime."

In 1751 moves towards a municipal police service in Philadelphia were made when the city's night watchmen and constables began receiving wages and a Board of Wardens was created to oversee the night watch.

In 1789 the United States Marshals Service was established, followed by other federal services such as the U.S. Parks Police (1791) and U.S. Mint Police (1792). Municipal police services were created in Richmond, Virginia in 1807, Boston in 1838, and New York City in 1845. The United States Secret Service was founded in 1865 and was for some time the main investigative body for the federal government.

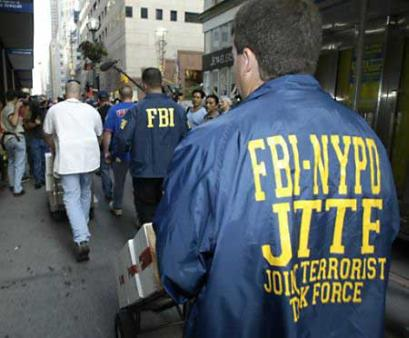
Members of the FBI–NYPD Joint Terrorism Task Force carrying evidence as part of an investigation in the early 2000s

Modern policing influenced by the British model of policing established in 1829 based on the Peelian principles began emerging in the United States in the mid-19th century, replacing previous law enforcement systems based primarily on night watch organizations. Cities began establishing organized, publicly funded, full-time professional police services. In Boston, a day police consisting of six officers under the command of the city marshal was established in 1838 to supplement the city's night watch. This paved the way for the establishment of the Boston Police Department in 1854. In New York City, law enforcement up to the 1840s was handled by a night watch as well as city marshals, municipal police officers, and constables. In 1845, the New York City Police Department was established. In Philadelphia, the first police officers to patrol the city in daytime were employed in 1833 as a supplement to the night watch system, leading to the establishment of the Philadelphia Police Department in 1854.

In the American Old West, law enforcement was carried out by local sheriffs, rangers, constables, and federal marshals. There were also town marshals responsible for serving civil and criminal warrants, maintaining the jails, and carrying out arrests for petty crime.

In addition to federal, state, and local forces, some special districts have been formed to provide extra police protection in designated areas. These districts may be known as neighborhood improvement districts, crime prevention districts, or security districts.

In 2022, San Francisco supervisors approved a policy allowing municipal police (San Francisco Police Department) to use robots for various law enforcement and emergency operations, permitting their employment as a deadly force option in cases where the "risk of life to members of the public or officers is imminent and outweighs any other force option available to SFPD." This policy has been criticized by groups such as the Electronic Frontier Foundation and the ACLU, who have argued that "killer robots will not make San Francisco better" and "police might even bring armed robots to a protest."

== See also ==
- Chief of police
- Crime statistics
- Criminal citation
- Criminal justice
- Fraternal Order of Police
- History of criminal justice
- Highway patrol
- Militsiya
- Officer Down Memorial Page
- Police academy
- Police car
- Police certificate
- Police foundation
- Police science
- Police state
- Police training officer
- Private police
- Public administration
- Public security
- Riot police
- Shurṭa
- State police
- Vigilante
- Women in law enforcement

Lists

- List of basic law enforcement topics
- List of countries and dependencies by number of police officers
- List of countries with annual rates and counts for killings by law enforcement officers
- List of law enforcement agencies
- List of protective service agencies
- Police rank
