= Volunteers in Police Service =

Logo

The Volunteers in Police Service (VIPS) is a volunteer program that provides volunteer assistance to local police. The program is managed by the International Association of Chiefs of Police in partnership with the White House Office of the USA Freedom Corps and the Bureau of Justice Assistance, a component of the Office of Justice Programs. The program is part of the Citizen Corps partner program.

== Similar programmes ==
- The United Kingdom has similar programme which was first started in 1992 whereby unpaid civilians hold the casual rank of Police Support Volunteer in British police forces and voluntarily work on a variety of police duties.
- Australia has some police forces, particularly New South Wales Police, with programmes called Volunteers in Policing. The program is very similar to the British counterpart except volunteers wear a uniform of blue shirt and black trousers.
