= Police Service (Volunteer Police) Amendment Act 1992 =

Police Service (Volunteer Police) Amendment Act 1992 No. 54

Parliament of New South Wales
- Long title: An Act to amend the Police Service Act 1990 to provide for the undertaking, on a trial basis, of certain aspects of police work by community volunteers.
- Passed: 24 September 1992
- Royal assent: 7 October 1992
- Introduced by: The Hon. Edward Pickering MLC, Minister for Police

Amended by
- Automatically repealed on 31 December 1994 by virtue of section 91H of the Act.

Related legislation
- Police Service Act 1990
- Status: Repealed

The Police Service (Volunteer Police) Amendment Act 1992 was an Act of the Parliament of New South Wales, Australia, establishing a trial of volunteer police officers in the New South Wales Police Service. Introduced to the Parliament by the Liberal Government, the Act was strongly opposed by the Labor Opposition and the New South Wales Police Association.

The Act was automatically repealed by virtue of a sunset clause on 31 December 1994.

== Background ==
The United Kingdom and Canada have long histories of allowing volunteers to serve on a part-time basis alongside regular constables in their special constabularies and auxiliary constabularies respectively. The intention of the Police Service (Volunteer Police) Amendment Act 1992 was to adapt the principle of voluntary part-time police service for New South Wales.

== The volunteer police ==
The Act established the position of 'police volunteer' within the Police Service and collected these volunteers under the title 'the volunteer police'. The Commissioner of Police was given the powers to appoint, discipline and dismiss police volunteers and also to determine their functions, with the requirement that police volunteers be under the supervision of police officers at all times.

Appointment as a police volunteer conferred on a person the same powers and privileges of a special constable appointed under the Police (Special Provisions) Act 1901, which gave the police volunteer the same powers as a constable employed by the Police Service. However, while the Commissioner could determine what weapons were to be carried by police volunteers, the Act specifically prohibited them carrying or using firearms.

== Debate ==
There was much parliamentary debate on the Act. When the Opposition called a division, the vote was split evenly and the Speaker of the Legislative Assembly used his casting vote to resolve the matter in the affirmative.

=== Support ===
Supporters of the Act - members of the Liberals and the Democrats - argued that volunteer police would build upon the community policing practices implemented by the Government, would augment police in the event of an emergency, and would allow members of the public to contribute to a cause which they felt strongly about.

Over recent years the New South Wales Police Service has adopted community-based policing as its primary operational strategy. The proposed introduction of volunteers in policing is a logical extension of community-based policing.... the tradition of volunteer service to the community is a particularly strong one in Australia. However, the concept of using volunteers in policing is new to Australia.

— The Hon. Edward Pickering MLC, NSW Parliamentary Hansard

Volunteer involvement engenders a sense of community, a connection between paid workers and the ordinary public with both committed to a common purpose. Furthermore, the experience of volunteers and their different skills enhance the quality of the service.

— The Hon. Elisabeth Kirkby MLC, NSW Parliamentary Hansard

=== Opposition ===
The Labor Opposition, backed by the principal unions in the Police Service - the New South Wales Police Association, the Commissioned Police Officers Association of New South Wales, and the Public Service Association - was opposed to the Act. Arguments against the Act revolved around concerns that police volunteers would not be sufficiently trained, experienced or equipped for police work, and that the Government intended on tricking the public into thinking there were more police officers on the streets than was actually the case.

If the Opposition had the opportunity to name the legislation, it would call it the hobby bobby legislation... The public needs, deserves and requires an accountable, trained and professional Police Service; it does not need well-intentioned amateurs.

— The Hon. Ron Dyer MLC, NSW Parliamentary Hansard

In another place Reverend the Hon. F. J. Nile asked what would happen if an armed holdup were to take place, as happened at Chatswood recently. In an instance such as that involving an unarmed volunteer, what would have happened? A bloke with a gun would come out of the bank and the volunteer would say: "Do not shoot. I am a volunteer. He is not a volunteer, you can shoot him. I am a volunteer, I have no gun".

— Peter Anderson MLA, NSW Parliamentary Hansard

== Successor scheme ==
In 1995, the NSW Police Service introduced a scheme called Volunteers in Policing which allows community members to assist police by performing certain non-core police duties. Such duties are limited to community engagement and basic administrative tasks, with no law enforcement responsibilities or powers granted to volunteers.
