= History of criminal justice =

Throughout the history of criminal justice, evolving forms of punishment, added rights for offenders and victims, and policing reforms have reflected changing customs, political ideals, and economic conditions.

== Background ==
Primates often have notions of fairness and sharing, with violations punished by exclusion or banishment from social groups. In human history, prior to agriculture, more nomadic cultures had systems of punishment for behavior or resistance. With the development of agriculture, which led to more closely populated cities and cultures and behavior to address fears of persons taking advantage of or causing harm to others, more formal systems of punishment for crimes developed, independently around the world, or based upon other cultures, including those developed in the early Babylonian laws of Hammurabi and the Hammurabic Code.

== Medieval Middle East ==
A police force called the shurta was "an urban force for the suppression of crime" that originated as a branch of the military. They were responsible for dealing with brigands and allegedly rebels as well as exercising judicial functions (often in rivalry with the qadi).

The muhtasib was responsible for enforcing laws on markets, Islamic morality and sumptuary laws for dhimmis.

== Ancient Egypt ==
In Ancient Egypt a police force was created by the time of the Fifth Dynasty (25th – 24th century BC). The guards, chosen by kings and nobles from among the military and ex-military, were tasked with apprehending criminals and protecting caravans, public places and border forts before the creation of a standing army. The police used lethal and non-lethal tools (such as wooden staffs) and utilized monkeys and dogs.

During the reign of Amenemhat I (1991 BC – 1962 BC) the role of professional judges were established and employed to decide court cases. The police force was specifically focused on law enforcement, while a newly created standing military was utilized to fulfill the police's other, previous tasks.

== Ancient China ==
Law enforcement in Ancient China was carried out by "prefects". The notion of a "prefect" in China has existed for thousands of years. The prefecture system developed in both the Chu and Jin kingdoms of the Spring and Autumn period. In Jin, dozens of prefects were spread across the state, each having a limited authority and employment period.

In Ancient China, under the rule of Dang Lin Wang, a new judicial system emerged. This new system had prefects appointed by local magistrates, who in turn were appointed by the head of state, usually the emperor of the dynasty. The prefects oversaw the civil administration of their "prefecture", or jurisdiction.

Prefects usually reported to the local magistrate, just as modern police report to judges. Under each prefect were "subprefects" who helped collectively with law enforcement of the area. Some prefects were responsible for handling investigations, much like modern police detectives.

Eventually the concept of the "prefecture system" would spread to other cultures such as Korea and Japan. Law enforcement in Ancient China was also relatively progressive, allowing for female prefects. Some examples of ancient Chinese prefects include: Chong Fu, prefect of the Ying District in the East Han Dynasty, and Ching Chow, prefect of the modern Shang-tung Province. An example of a female prefect would be Lady Qu of Wuding (serving 1531 – c. 1557).

In ancient China, when minor judicial incidents such as robberies occur, the client reports to a police officer (a.k.a. constable) at the prefectural office. To catch a thief, a constable can arrest another thief by baiting him with a forged opportunity and use the thief's same-field knowledge to predict the one in question. The assisting thief would still be punished for robbery but since he assisted the officer his punishment would be lowered.

By Ming law, police officers have a strict time schedule to arrest the criminals. They usually have thirty days to arrest the issued criminals. If officers have not capture their assigned criminals after thirty days or assigned deadline, they would subject to physical punishments. Successfully arresting criminals earns police officers promotions. However, this method was often subject to abuse in order to quickly earn promotions.

Police officers were appointed by the head officials from the populations. These selected officers, however, were not recognized as part of the magistrates for they were merely runners.

Approximately one out of four court cases featured corrupted officers who accepted bribes to ignore certain crimes, or sometimes even assisted the criminals. Officers often focused on building a social network which might include criminals instead of making examples by preventing crimes.

== Songhai Empire ==
Criminal justice in Songhai was based mainly, if not entirely, on Islamic principles, especially during the rule of Askia Muhammad. The local qadis were, in addition to this, responsible for maintaining order by following Sharia law under Islamic domination, according to the Qur'an. An additional qadi was noted as a necessity to settle minor disputes between immigrant merchants. Kings usually did not judge a defendant; however, under exceptional circumstances, such as acts of treason, they felt obligated to do so and thus exerted their authority. Results of a trial were announced by the "town crier", and punishment for most trivial crimes usually consisted of confiscation of merchandise or even imprisonment since various prisons existed throughout the Empire.

Qadis worked locally in important trading towns like Timbuktu and Djenné. The king appointed the Qadi and dealt with common-law misdemeanours according to Sharia law. The Qadi also had the power to grant a pardon or offer refuge. The Assara-munitions, or "enforcers", worked like a police commissioner whose sole duty was to execute sentencing. Jurists were mainly composed of representatives of the academic community; professors were often noted as taking administrative positions within the Empire, and many aspired to be qadis.

== Pre-modern Europe ==
For the most part, crime was viewed as a private matter in Ancient Greece and Rome. Even with offenses as serious as murder, justice was the prerogative of the victim's family and private war or vendetta the means of protection against criminality. Publicly owned slaves were used by magistrates as police in Ancient Greece. In Athens, a group of 300 Scythian slaves was used to guard public meetings to keep order and for crowd control, and also assisted with dealing with criminals, manhandling prisoners, and making arrests. Other duties associated with modern policing, such as investigating crimes, were left to the citizens themselves. The Roman Empire had a reasonably effective law enforcement system until the decline of the empire, though there was never an actual police force in the city of Rome. When under the reign of Augustus the capital had grown to almost one million inhabitants, he created 14 wards, which were protected by seven squads of 1,000 men. If necessary, they might have called on the Praetorian Guard for assistance. Beginning in the 5th century, policing became a function of clan chiefs and heads of state.

During the Middle Ages, crime and punishment were dealt with through blood feuds (or trial by ordeal) between the parties. Payment to the victim (or their family), known as wergild, was another common punishment, including for violent crimes. For those who could not afford to buy their way out of punishment, harsh penalties included various forms of corporal punishment. These included mutilation, whipping, branding, and flogging, as well as execution. Västgötalagen specifies exactly how much to pay, if anything, depending on who was slain. The primary form of state-administered punishment during ancient times and the Middle Ages was banishment or exile. Though a prison, Le Stinche, existed as early as the 14th century in Florence, incarceration was not widely used until the 19th century. Rather, it was used to detain prisoners before trial or for imprisoning people without judicial process.

The Anglo-Saxon system of maintaining public order was a private system of tithings, since the Norman conquest led by a constable, which was based on a social obligation for the good conduct of the others; more common was that local lords and nobles were responsible to maintain order in their lands, and often appointed a constable, sometimes unpaid, to enforce the law.

== Colonial America ==
When early colonists first came to America, they did not include trained lawyers or other law-knowledgeable persons. Many parts of the criminal justice system in colonial America were similar to those in England, France, and the Dutch Republic. Gradually French and Dutch influences disappeared in the islands. What remained was the basic idea many had of the English common law system.

This system was the best-known to 17th-century colonists. The common law system included a set of rules that were used to solve problems in society. It was based on the history of decisions previous judges had made instead of lawmaking codes or laws. This system made a distinction between two basic types of crimes: felonies and misdemeanors. The legal process, mostly for more serious crimes, involved a grand jury, composed of members of the community, which decided whether there was enough evidence for prosecution. However, in these proceedings no district attorneys or public prosecutors were available. The victim of the crime was responsible for instigating the prosecution and financing it. It was these fundamental principles that stuck with the colonists and were used selectively to create a new and unique criminal justice system.

Many factors influenced the colonists’ selection process by which they constructed their approach to criminal justice. As previously mentioned, there were no professional legal experts and few law resources available. This left a lot of room for creativity and mistakes. The colonists were largely left to their own devices concerning the details of their developing criminal justice system. The new environment the colonists encountered in the New World, especially the western frontier, also affected the way the law was shaped. The system was molded to fit the colonists’ needs as they settled further and further west. Vigilantism was an inevitable byproduct of the faults of the development of justice in America. Religion, especially early on in the colonial period, exerted a strong influence on law making. Legal codes, such as the 1648 Book of the General Laws and Liberties of the Massachusetts Bay Colony, contained very strong biblical references, more so than did the ones in England. Although this religious impact was felt most strongly in Puritan colonies, similar ideas were evident among other colonists as well. Many colonial makeshift criminal codes considered lying, idleness, drunkenness, certain sexual offenses, and even bad behavior to be crimes. These moralistic crimes stemmed from the relation of crime to sin and sin to crime. Adding to the religious factor, the colonists held individual liberty in high regard. This later influenced more contemporary criminal codes.

=== County sheriff ===
Besides being one of the most important criminal justice officials of the colonial period in America, the county sheriff had other responsibilities. These included collecting taxes, running and supervising elections, and handling any other legal business in the community. With such a workload, sheriffs were usually the most important political figures in the county and represented the governor and the English government. In the criminal justice system of the period, the sheriff acted as a reactive official. His job was to follow up on complaints or information of misconduct from the other citizens. He was paid through a system of fees rather than a set salary which came mostly from tax collecting. This discouraged many sheriffs from concentrating heavily on law enforcement. Such high powers often led to corruption in this field with embezzlement and other irregularities with tax collections and fees.

=== Judges and magistrates ===
Judges are also known as magistrates or justices of the peace. Even though a judge held very influential positions in their counties, they were far from the professionals that they are today. They were usually religious or political leaders. The county judge was in charge of the court for the area he presided in and vehemently believed their role in society was to enforce God's will. Their understanding of God's will usually caused colonial justices to seek confessions and repentance from the accused rather than just punishment. The main goal was to bring order back to society. Most of the minor cases in the county only involved the judge while more serious crimes were heard by a court of several judges. The courts met only periodically, slowing down the sentencing of serious crimes.

=== Colonial courts ===
Although the colonial courts did closely mimic the proceedings of the courts of England, they were much simpler and more informal. They were also made available to everyone and used to relieve tensions and conflicts in the community. In addition to hearing the disputes of the local colonists, the courts also held the responsibilities of the legislature, executive, and judicial branches of the county's government. These responsibilities illustrated the highly unspecialized nature of colonial government agencies. The courts became connected to an informal role in the county's social and economic life. Although some county courts were presided over by one judge, some consisted of ten to fifteen judges. However, the courts with many judges met very infrequently and this made it almost impossible to conduct any legal business in a fast and efficient way. The matter was even worse in the back country where there often was a complete lack of courts to settle any conflicts or perform governmental services.

=== Legal process ===
The legal process of trials in colonial America was quite different from the modern one in many ways. After an alleged crime was reported, a magistrate, or judge, would consider the presented evidence and decide whether it was a true crime. If the magistrate decided that a crime was indeed committed the accused was apprehended and brought to be questioned by the magistrate. The interrogation was usually held in the magistrate's own house with a few marshals or deputies as witnesses. However, during this step in the procedure, no lawyers were involved on behalf of either party. After the hearing the accused was usually free to leave until the trial without bail.

Just as in the interrogation, there was no defense attorney present at the trial and the proceedings moved quickly as each witness testified against the defendant. However, a district attorney, who was often appointed by the governor and assigned to a certain district or county, usually handled the prosecution. Unlike the prosecutors in England, who worked privately and for a payment from the victim, the district attorneys of colonial America handled the prosecution in almost all trials. The district attorney's position soon became one of the most important political position in county government because they often had to be elected.

The role of the defense attorney was minuscule, if not unheard of, in the colonial period. This stemmed from an English legal tradition of severely restricting the role of the defense to challenging or question narrow points of the law. In time the American practice of trials allowed a greater and more vigorous role to the defense of the accused. However, at that current time there were few trained lawyers to begin with and most defendants could not afford one.

Juries were also not used at that time and those who requested them were thought to be challenging the authority of the judge. Since the magistrate who had proclaimed the trial necessary was also the judge who presided over the trial, the verdict was quite often guilty. The main purpose of the trial was to give the defendant a chance to admit their guilt and repent. The theory behind the trial and punishment being very public was that they would serve to reinforce the rules of conduct and discourage others from acting out and breaking laws.

=== Protection of cities ===
The colonists soon realized that a sheriff was not enough to keep their colonies safe and crime-free. Many villages and cities began adding other criminal justice agents to help maintain order. The rising populations were proving to be too much to handle for just one law enforcement agent in the county. The mayor was originally the chief law enforcement official, but he acted only in extreme circumstances. In addition to the sheriff, the mayor appointed a high constable and several lesser constables and marshals to help him. Those holding such positions had powers similar to those of the sheriff.

To protect their citizens during the night, many counties established a night watch, an institution of criminal justice originally inherited from Europe. The night watch consisted of a group of civilians who patrolled and kept watch over the city, making sure to look for fires, suspicious individuals, or possible riots. This was a collective responsibility, but few were willing to serve. Certain cities imposed fines on those who refused.

The night watch, though relatively effective, only served during the night. During the day, the responsibility of protecting innocent citizens and apprehending criminals fell to the constables and marshals. Soon a day watch was implemented in many areas. In extreme situations, such as riots, the colonial communities often had to call out the militia. Riots, a common disturbance in colonial America, occurred for many reasons including to contest elections, to protest economic conditions, or to enforce standards of morality. Even at the first sign of a riot the mayor or some other official would appear and literally read the riot act to the assembled crowd.

=== Punishments ===
Depending on the crimes that the colonists committed, there were plenty of punishments to choose from. Most of the punishments were public, where heavy use of shame and shaming was included. Through the method of shaming, the criminal justice system meant more to teach a lesson than simply punish the offender. The "criminal" was almost always male. However, punishment for such crimes as witchcraft, infanticide, and adultery fell heavily on the women. In addition, much of the blame and punishment for crimes was attributed to those in the lowest rank in society.

Whipping was the most commonly used form of punishment, especially in the American South with slaves. Other frequently used punishments included branding, cutting off ears, and placing people in the pillory. These punishments were sometimes harsher, depending on the crimes committed. In Colonial America, executions were less common than in Europe. However, when such a method was used, it was most often a public hanging. Usually capital offenses, such as murder or rape, or repeated serious offenses constituted a need for an execution.

Imprisonment was uncommon in colonial America since the budding colonies did not have people to spare to keep the community in order. Every person was valuable for their working ability, and losing even one worker to lawkeeping was neither reasonable nor an efficient use of resources. In addition, colonial communities rarely had enough extra money to build a prison and feed prisoners.

Since probation was not yet known to the colonists, they used a system of nods to guarantee troublemakers would not cause any problems. Courts began to require many problem-causing people to put up money to make sure they would stay out of trouble. This system worked especially well in communities where everyone minded each other's business.

=== County jails ===
In the early colonial period, prisons were not yet a major staple in the criminal justice system. They were used mainly for holding people who were awaiting trial rather than punishment. The early jails resembled ordinary houses in many aspects and had no distinctive architectural features. Prisoners were placed in rooms instead of cells and were not classified or segregated in any way. Men, women, and juveniles were mixed together causing many problems.

Overcrowding soon became a big concern, as well as poor sanitation. The jails turned into breeding houses of illness. Furthermore, the jails were even unable to fulfill their basic purpose of containing offenders within its walls. Escapes were very frequent. The prisons held not only those who were awaiting trial but also people who owed money, called debtors. These people were free during the day so they could work to pay off their debt but they returned to the jail at night. Other prisoners included the homeless, unemployed, or impoverished. They were expected to learn good work ethic during their stay.

The financial arrangements of the jailer were similar to those of the sheriff, especially since the same person usually held both jobs. He was paid by the county through a system of fees. Specific items such as food, clothing, and other things were submitted to the county commissioners for money. Just like other criminal justice positions with a lot of power, the jailer was often corrupt and was notoriously known for embezzling public funds, soliciting bribes from prisoners and their families, selling whiskey to the prisoners, and abusing the inmates.

=== Administration of justice in colonial America ===
==== Crime problem ====
The gradual development of a sophisticated criminal justice system in America found itself extremely small and unspecialized during colonial times. Many problems, including lack of a large law-enforcement establishment, separate juvenile-justice system, and prisons and institutions of probation and parole. Criminal matters were also not the top priority of the sheriff and the courts. The lack of a large institutional framework was a result of relatively small and homogenous colonial communities. These colonies were self-policing and social control was maintained by an omnipresent set of informal restrictions. They also depended on community pressure to regulate human conduct.

== Invention of "police" ==
In Western culture, the contemporary concept of a police paid by the government was developed by French legal scholars and practitioners in the 17th century and early 18th century, notably with Nicolas Delamare's Traité de la Police ("Treatise of the Police", published between 1705 and 1738). The German Polizeiwissenschaft (Science of Police) was also an important theoretical formulation of police.

The first statutory police force is believed to be the High Constables of Edinburgh, who were created by the Scottish parliament in 1611 to "guard their streets and to commit to ward all person found on the streets after the said hour".

The first police force in the modern sense was created by the government of King Louis XIV in 1667 to police the city of Paris, then the largest city of Europe and considered the most dangerous European city. The royal edict, registered by the Parlement of Paris on March 15, 1667, created the office of lieutenant général de police ("lieutenant general of police"), who was to be the head of the new Paris police force, and defined police as the task of "ensuring the peace and quiet of the public and of private individuals, purging the city of what may cause disturbances, procuring abundance, and having each and everyone live according to their station and their duties". This office was held by Gabriel Nicolas de la Reynie, who had 44 commissaires de police (police commissioners) under his authority. In 1709, these commissioners were assisted by inspecteurs de police (police inspectors). The city of Paris was divided into 16 districts policed by the 44 commissaires de police, each assigned to a particular district and assisted in their districts by clerks and a growing bureaucracy. The scheme of the Paris police force was extended to the rest of France by a royal edict of October 1699, resulting in the creation of lieutenants general of police in all large French cities or towns.

However, this early conceptualization of police was quite different from today's police forces, exclusively in charge of maintaining order and arresting criminals. As conceptualized by the Polizeiwissenschaft, the police had an economical and social duty ("procuring abundance"). It was in charge of demographics concerns and of empowering the population, which was considered by the mercantilist theory to be the main strength of the state. Thus, its functions largely overreached simple law enforcement activities, and included public health concerns, urban planning (which was important because of the miasma theory of disease; thus, cemeteries were moved out of town, etc.), surveillance of prices, etc.

Development of modern police was contemporary to the formation of the state, later defined by sociologist Max Weber as detaining "the monopoly on the legitimate use of physical force", primarily exercised by the police and the military.

=== Modern police ===
After the troubles of the French Revolution the Paris police force was reorganized by Napoléon I on February 17, 1800, as the Prefecture of Police, along with the reorganization of police forces in all French cities with more than 5,000 inhabitants. On March 12, 1829, a government decree created the first uniformed policemen in Paris and all French cities, known as sergents de ville ("city sergeants"), which the Paris Prefecture of Police's website claims were the first uniformed policemen in the world.

In London, there existed watchmen hired to guard the streets at night since 1663. Watchmen were the first paid law enforcement in the country, augmenting the force of unpaid constables, but were not professionally organized. The word "police" was borrowed from French into the English language in the 18th century, but for a long time it applied only to French and continental European police forces. The word, and the concept of police itself, was "disliked as a symbol of foreign oppression". Prior to the 19th century, the only official use of the word "police" recorded in the United Kingdom was the appointment of Commissioners of Police for Scotland in 1714 and the creation of the Marine Police in 1798 (set up to protect merchandise at the Port of London).

On June 30, 1800, the authorities of Glasgow, Scotland successfully petitioned the Government to pass the Glasgow Police Act establishing the City of Glasgow Police. This was the first professional police service in the world that differed from previous law enforcement in that it was a preventive police force. This was quickly followed in other Scottish towns, which set up their own police forces by individual Acts of Parliament. On September 29, 1829, the Metropolitan Police Act was passed by Parliament, allowing Sir Robert Peel, the then home secretary, to found the London Metropolitan Police. Based on the Peelian principles, this was the city's first full-time, professional and centrally-organised police force. The Metropolitan Police officers were often referred to as "Bobbies" after Sir Robert (Bobby) Peel. They are regarded as the first modern police force and became a model for the police forces in most countries, such as the United States, and most of the then British Empire (Commonwealth). Bobbies can still be found in many parts of the world (for example in British Overseas Territories or ex-colonies such as Bermuda, Gibraltar or St Helena). The model of policing in Britain had as its primary role the keeping of the king's peace and this has continued to the present day. Many of the Commonwealth countries developed police forces using similar models, such as Canada, Australia and New Zealand.

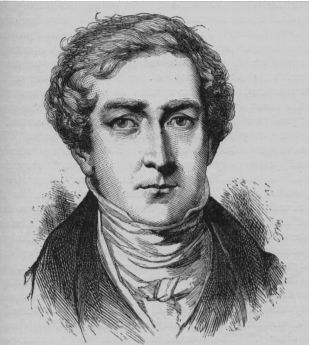
Sir Robert Peel

In North America, the Toronto Police was founded in Canada in 1834, one of the first municipal police departments on that continent, followed by police forces in Montreal and Quebec City both founded in 1838. In the United States, the first organized police service was established in Boston in 1838, New York in 1844, and Philadelphia in 1854.

Early on, police were not respected by the community, as corruption was rampant. In the late 19th and early 20th century, there were few specialized units in police departments.

In 1905, the Pennsylvania State Police became the first state police agency established in the United States, as recommended by Theodore Roosevelt's Anthracite Strike Commission and Governor Samuel Pennypacker.

The advent of the police car, two-way radio, and telephone in the early 20th century transformed policing into a reactive strategy that focused on responding to calls for service. In the 1920s, led by Berkeley, California, police chief, August Vollmer, police began to professionalize, adopt new technologies, and place emphasis on training. With this transformation, police command and control became more centralized. O.W. Wilson, a student of Vollmer, helped reduce corruption and introduce professionalism in Wichita, Kansas, and later in the Chicago Police Department. Strategies employed by O.W. Wilson included rotating officers from community to community to reduce their vulnerability to corruption, establishing of a non-partisan police board to help govern the police force, a strict merit system for promotions within the department, and an aggressive, recruiting drive with higher police salaries to attract professionally qualified officers.

Despite such reforms, police agencies were led by highly autocratic leaders, and there remained a lack of respect between police and the community. During the professionalism era of policing, law enforcement agencies concentrated on dealing with felonies and other serious crime, rather than focusing on crime prevention. Following urban unrest in the 1960s, police placed more emphasis on community relations, and enacted reforms such as increased diversity in hiring. The Kansas City Preventive Patrol study in the 1970s found the reactive approach to policing to be ineffective.

In the 1990s, many law enforcement agencies began to adopt community policing strategies, and others adopted problem-oriented policing. In the 1990s, CompStat was developed by the New York Police Department as an information-based system for tracking and mapping crime patterns and trends, and holding police accountable for dealing with crime problems. CompStat, and other forms of information-led policing, have since been replicated in police departments across the United States.

== See also ==
- History of law enforcement in the United Kingdom
- Detective § History

== Primary sources ==
- Connected Histories
- Old Bailey Proceedings Online
