= Police science =

Branch of science

Police science or police studies is the study of police work. It is a subfield of criminology and sociology. As an interdisciplinary science, the field includes contributions from political science, forensic science, anthropology, psychology, jurisprudence, criminal justice, human geography, correctional administration and penology. The field makes contributions to understanding of community policing, police culture, and other policing tactics or behaviors.

There was a "dizzying expansion" of police studies in the early 2000s with a large number of works being published in the field.

== By country ==
=== United Kingdom ===
UK has developed the Police National Computer as a sophisticated intelligence tool that holds extensive data on criminals, vehicles and property, and accessible in a matter of seconds through over 30,000 terminals across the country.

PITO reports that a national fingerprint and DNA database has been developed containing over 3.4 million DNA profiles providing the police with an average of 3,000 matches a month. In 2004-5 there were over 40,000 matches.

The police use a wide range of technologies to curb road traffic offences like speeding and drunk driving including breathalyser devices, bus lane enforcement cameras, immobilisation devices, light signals devices and speed measuring devices.

=== Bangladesh ===
A department of Criminology and Police Science (CPS) has launched in 2003 at Mawlana Bhashani Science and Technology University.

== See also ==
- Crime science
- Polizeiwissenschaft
