= Proactive policing =

Police presence for crime deterrence

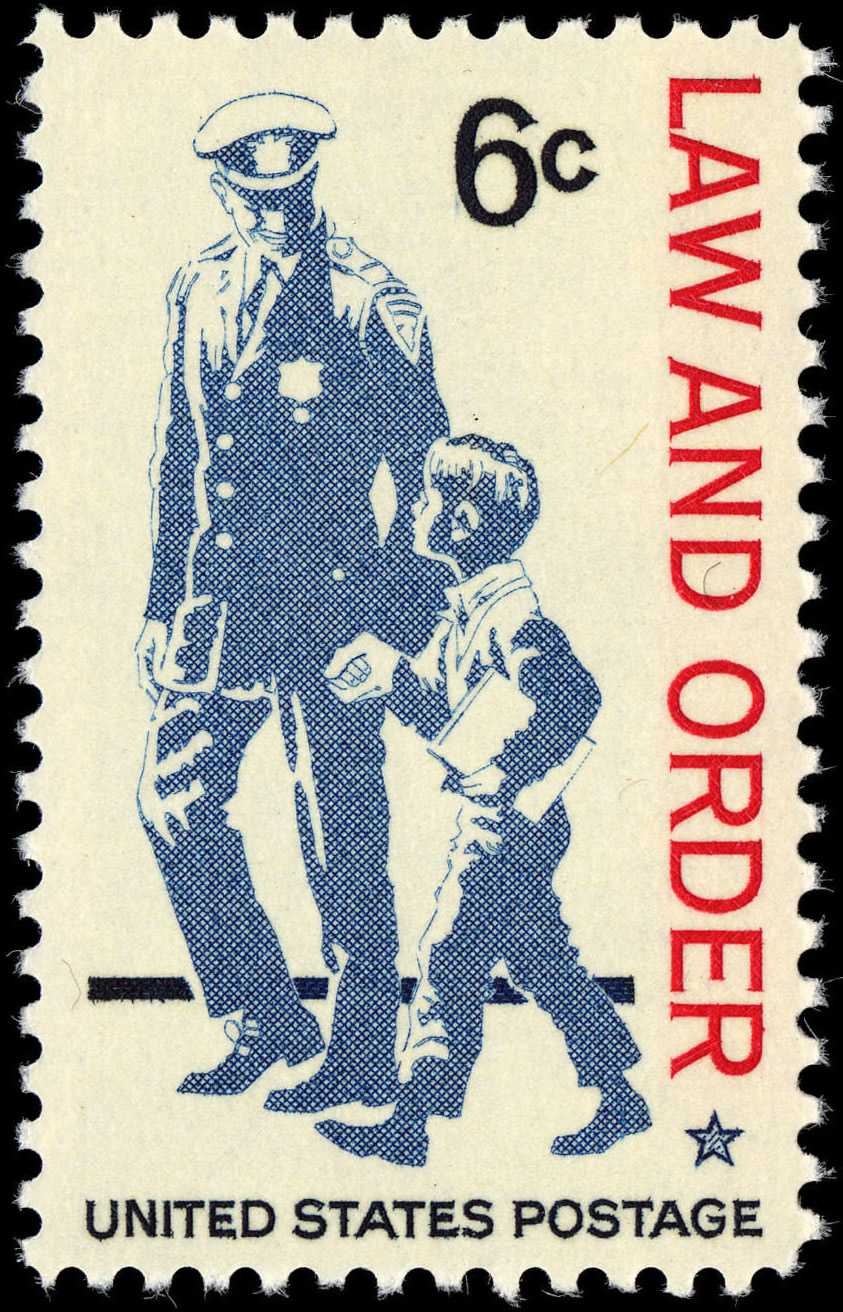
U.S. stamp of 1968.

Proactive policing is the practice of deterring criminal activity by showing police presence. It includes activities such as the use of police powers by both uniformed and plainclothes officers, engaging the public to learn their concerns, and investigating and discovering offences and conspiracies to commit crimes so that the crimes cannot be committed. In contrast, responding to a complaint after a crime has been committed is reactive policing.

According to a 2017 report by the National Academy of Sciences, there is "evidence that a number of proactive policing practices are successful in reducing crime and disorder, at least in the short term, and that most of these strategies do not harm communities' attitudes toward police. However, the effects of proactive policing on other important outcomes—such as on the legality of police behavior and on racially biased behavior—are unclear because of gaps in research... Moreover, evidence on many proactive strategies is limited to near-term, localized impacts. Little is known about the strategies' long-term effects on crime or other outcomes, and about whether and to what extent they will offer crime control benefits at a larger jurisdictional level—for example, across an entire precinct or city."

A separate report, also from 2017, found that during a period when the New York Police Department was intentionally not practicing proactive policing, major crime reports dropped.

== History ==
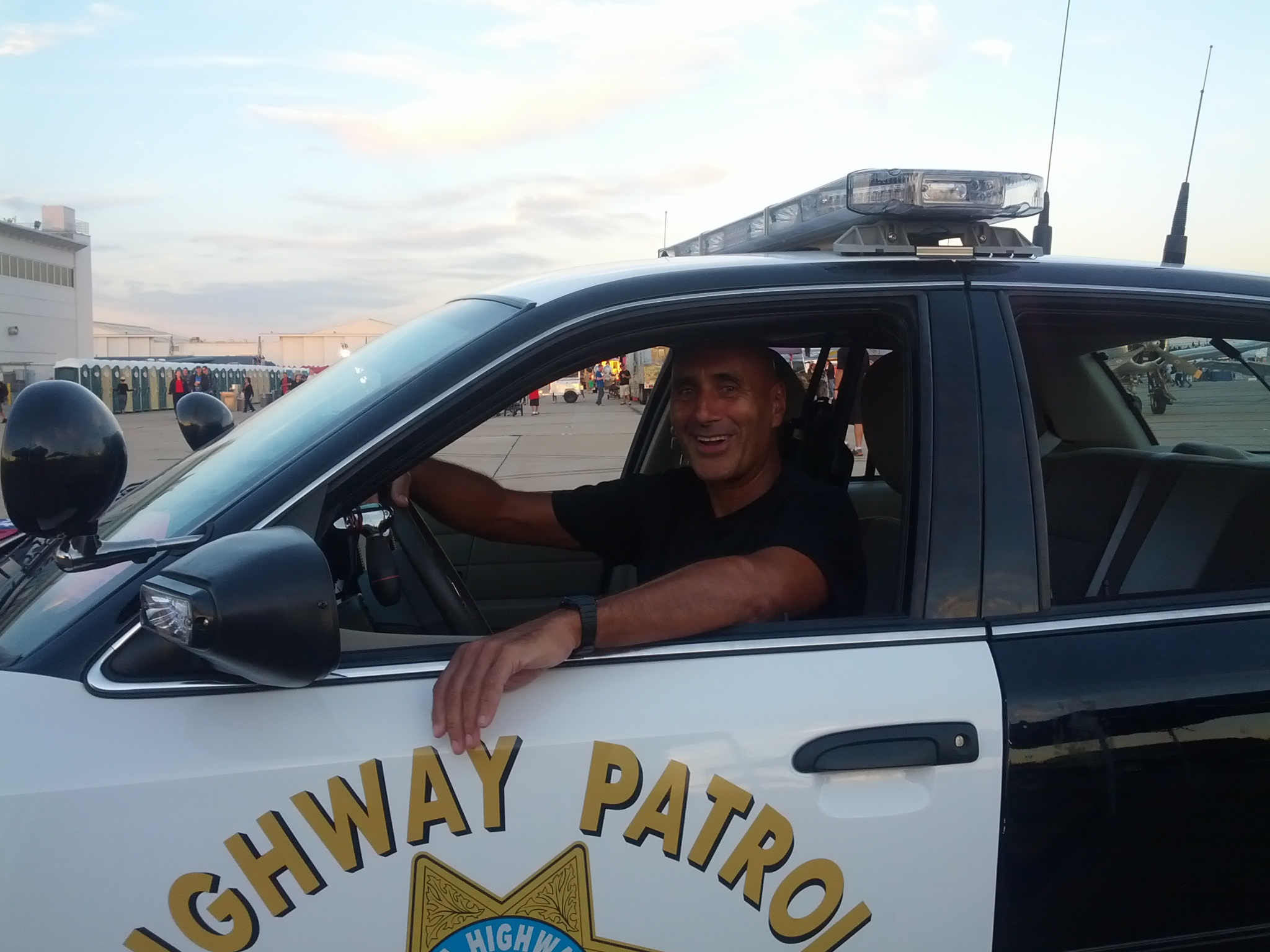
California Highway Patrol

Individual officers wield an enormous amount of discretion in enforcing the law (especially non-dispatched runs like traffic enforcement or street crime). What is surprising is the public belief that police are usually eager and motivated to do their job. Thus, when a particular crime problem becomes apparent, it is often approached by monetarily related arguments, such as the need for more police, equipment, training etc.; rather than by non-monetary related approaches, such as recognizing how a high perception of alienation among police officers from the civilians of the community where they patrol reduces morale and spawns police indifference, indolence, and apathy. The impact of alienation is especially relevant as the contemporary community policing movement emphasizes proactive law enforcement strategies. Effective community policing requires that police officers work closely with local civilians in designing and implementing a variety of proactive crime prevention and control measures. To accomplish these initiatives, it is crucial that officers feel closely integrated with the majority of civilians in the community they serve. Typically, this means that officers perceive themselves as sharing important community values and beliefs and being confident of community support in the decisions they make.

As the perception of community alienation increases among police officers, their sense of confidence or mastery in decision making will decrease, and so too their motivation for proactive enforcement. The impact of highly publicized "pro-police" verdicts of brutality incidents (i.e., Rodney King, Los Angeles 1991; Malice Green, Detroit 1992; O.J. Simpson, Los Angeles 1994; Michael Brown, Ferguson 2014; Eric Garner, New York 2014; and Freddie Gray, Baltimore 2015) are related to the level of perceived alienation experienced by police and thus their willingness to respond proactively to serious crime. FBI Director James Comey and DEA chief Chuck Rosenberg suggested the "Ferguson effect" as the cause to recent spikes in crime in several large cities, especially Baltimore, Chicago, Milwaukee, and St. Louis. Essentially a sociological concept developed by several classical and contemporary theorists, alienation is a condition in social relationships reflected by a low degree of integration or common values and a high degree of distance or isolation between individuals, or between an individual and a group of people in a community or work environment. Alienation is closely aligned with the concept of mastery. Mastery is typically defined as a state of mind in which an individual feels autonomous and experiences confidence in his or her ability, skill, and knowledge to control or influence external events. The greater the level of alienation an individual experiences in a community or work setting, the weaker will be their sense of executive mastery.

For police officers, a strong sense of mastery in discretion and autonomous decision-making is particularly vital in relation to proactive law enforcement. Proactive enforcement is usually defined as the predisposition of a police officer to be actively involved in preventing and investigating crime. Because police patrol work is highly unsupervised, most officers have considerable discretion and personal autonomy in their level of proactive policing on the streets. Again, it would seem logical that the stronger the level of perceived community alienation among police officers, the weaker will be their sense of mastery and motivation to engage in proactive law enforcement behavior.

== Elements ==
Proactive policing is closely related to the practice of community policing. Community policing's goal is "problem solving." Community policing emphasizes proactive enforcement that proposes street crime can be reduced through greater community involvement and integration between civilians and police. Community policing departments and officers must commit time to develop a "partnership" with the community to: 1) Prevent and counter crime; 2) Maintain order; and 3) Reduce the fear of crime. Police organization is decentralized with every police officer and detective having a neighborhood to patrol with agreed upon goals and objectives to solve. Police officers must feel integrated with the majority of the civilians of the community where they patrol, and that they perceive themselves as sharing similar values and beliefs so they are confident in their decision making ability. Each police officer must get out of their cars (not just drive by and grin and wave) to visit with civilians and businesses to learn their concerns and show they're a friend and protector—in contrast to "strict law enforcement" or "reactive policing" which doesn't view the civilians as customers.

== Criticisms ==
A 2017 study found that proactive policing, defined as "systematic and aggressive enforcement of low-level violations" has a positive correlation to reports of major crime. The authors studied a period in 2014 and 2015 when the NYPD, during a political dispute between demonstrators protesting the death of Eric Garner and the police union, held a work slowdown. According to the study's abstract:

Officers were ordered to respond to calls only in pairs, leave their squad cars only if they felt compelled, and perform only the most necessary duties. The act was a symbolic show of strength to demonstrate the city’s dependence on the NYPD. Officers continued to respond to community calls for service, but refrained from proactive policing by refusing to get out of their vehicles to issue summonses or arrest people for petit crimes and misdemeanours.

The study found that during and for a short while after the police slowdown, reports of major crimes decreased.

Some people argue that policing should rightfully be restricted to reactive policing with a corollary that proactive policing is improper, if not illegal.

Often, due to the police discovering offenses rather than simply being called to them, crime figures rise as more offenses are recorded.

== See also ==
- Broken windows theory
- Civil liberties
- Community policing
- Deadly force
- Peelian principles
- Preventive policing
- Social alienation
