= Police legitimacy =

Public Opinion on the legitimacy of Law Enforcement

1888 pamphlet by George Fraser Black

Police legitimacy is the extent to which members of the public view the police as higher power authority figures, often measured in terms of the public's willingness to obey and cooperate with the police. Police legitimacy is linked to the degree of public support for, and cooperation with the police's efforts to fight crime. When a police officer's ability and authority to effectively complete their job are compromised, there is potential for a lack of police legitimacy.

People who experience more procedural justice in police encounters view the police as more legitimate. In contrast, order maintenance policing and widespread street stops appear to reduce police legitimacy among young men. An increase in public support and compliance can only be accomplished if fair procedures are implemented. Police legitimacy can be achieved by increasing the public involvement in police proceedings by informing and explaining to them the process of the decisions being made. The public make judgments regarding the activities of the police by evaluating their actions when conducting their duties, therefore, influencing their views about police legitimacy.

== Procedural Justice ==
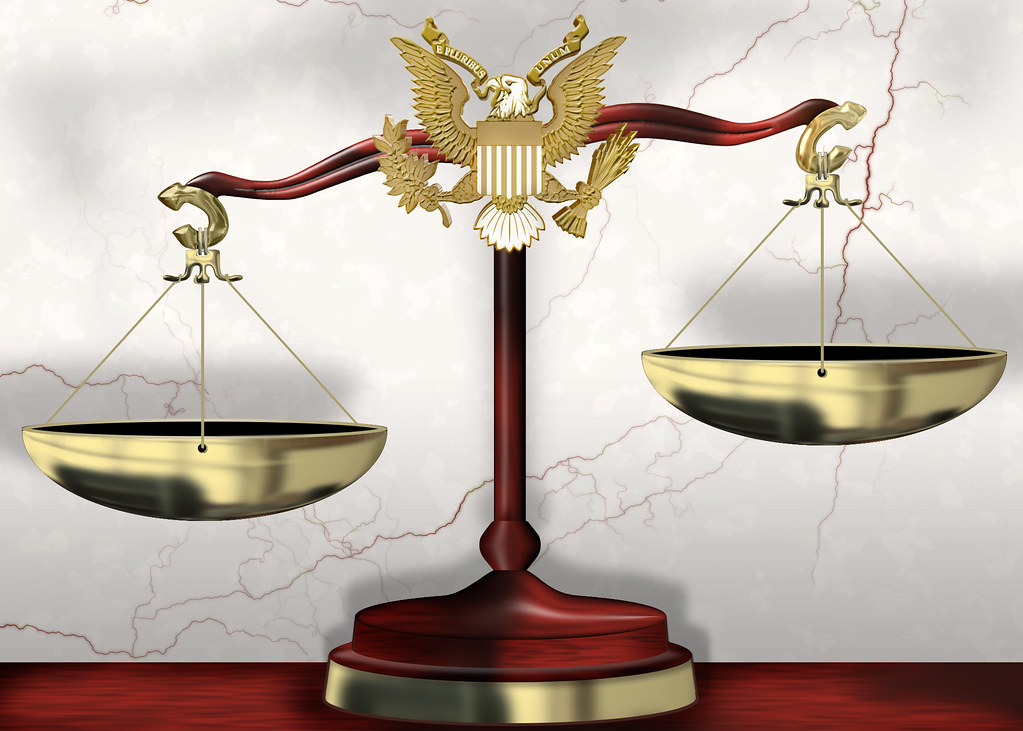
A symbol to represent justice in all forms of law.

Procedural justice refers to the idea that the police, courts, and other government institutions should enforce the law in an unbiased and impartial process. It consists of four main components that ensure that proper justice is administered to the public. Firstly, citizens should be allowed to participate and be informed about the proceedings before a governmental institution reaches a decision. Secondly, the procedure in question should make the public believe that the institution is reaching a decision in an unbiased manner. Thirdly, it shows that the institution in question has shown dignity and respect throughout the proceedings. Lastly, it should portray that the institution has motives in mind that benefit the citizens. Individuals who believe that they were dealt with in a procedurally just manner are more inclined to agree with the consequences they are facing for their actions. Procedural justice and police legitimacy are collectively linked meaning that a just procedure will promote the public's faith in law enforcement.

== See also ==
- Ferguson effect – Contested possibility of violent crime increasing with reduced proactive policing
- Legal cynicism – Negative perception of law enforcement
- Legitimation crisis – Decline of trust in authority
  - Defund the police – Slogan supporting reallocation of public safety funds away from policing
- Peelian principles – Philosophy defining ethical police force
- Gendarmerie – Military force tasked with law enforcement
