= Ferguson effect =

Theory linking de-policing to crime increases

The Ferguson effect is the theory that an increase in violent crime rates in a community is caused by reduced proactive policing due to the community's distrust and hostility towards police. The term was coined in November 2014 by Doyle Sam Dotson III, the chief of the St. Louis police, who attributed a local uptick in crime to officer fatigue from months of policing the Ferguson unrest that followed the 2014 shooting of Michael Brown in Ferguson, Missouri, saying "the criminal element is feeling empowered". It was popularized by Heather Mac Donald in a May 2015 op-ed in The Wall Street Journal that attributed rising violent crime in some U.S. cities to police pulling back amid "agitation" against law enforcement. The existence of the Ferguson effect is disputed. Many published studies report contradictory findings concerning whether there is a change in crime rates, number of 911 calls, homicides, and proactive policing. Furthermore, the effect and influence of the portrayal of police brutality in the media are also contested.

== Background ==
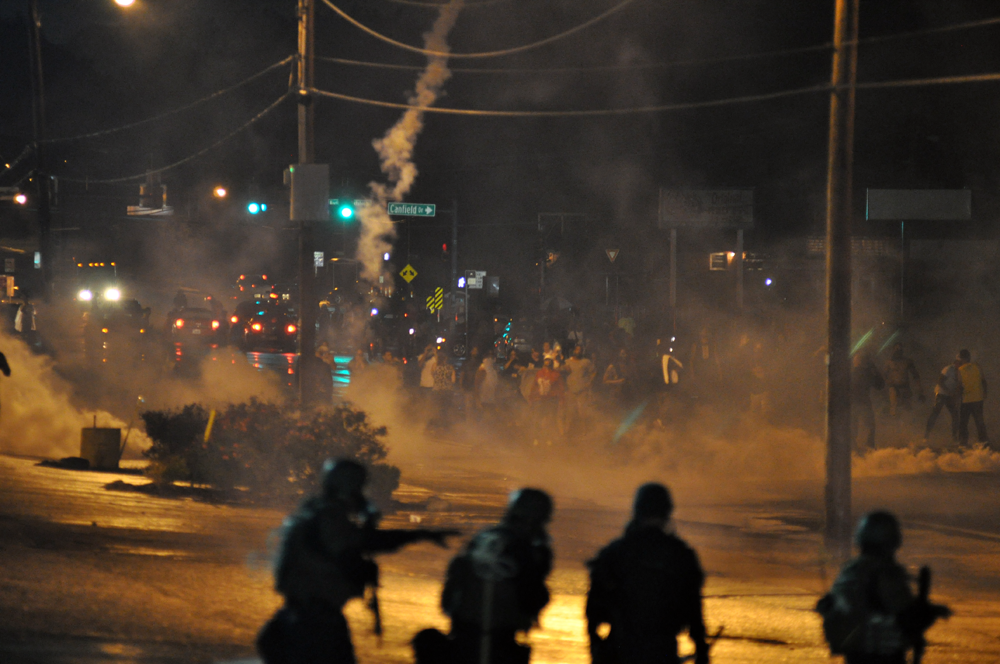
Ferguson, Missouri, August 17, 2014

The term was coined by St. Louis police chief Sam Dotson in November 2014, in remarks reported by the St. Louis Post-Dispatch. Citing rising assaults and robberies, falling arrests, and officer fatigue from months of policing the protests in Ferguson that followed the shooting of Michael Brown that August, Dotson said, "It's the Ferguson effect," adding that "the criminal element is feeling empowered by the environment."

The term became popular after Heather Mac Donald used it in a May 29, 2015 op-ed in The Wall Street Journal. The op-ed stated the rise in crime rates in some U.S. cities was due to "agitation" against police forces. She also argued, "Unless the demonization of law enforcement ends, the liberating gains in urban safety will be lost," quoting a number of police officers who said police morale was at an all-time low. In 2015, Rahm Emanuel, the mayor of Chicago, suggested that nationwide backlash against police brutality led to officers disengaging, which, in turn, led to violent crime increasing.

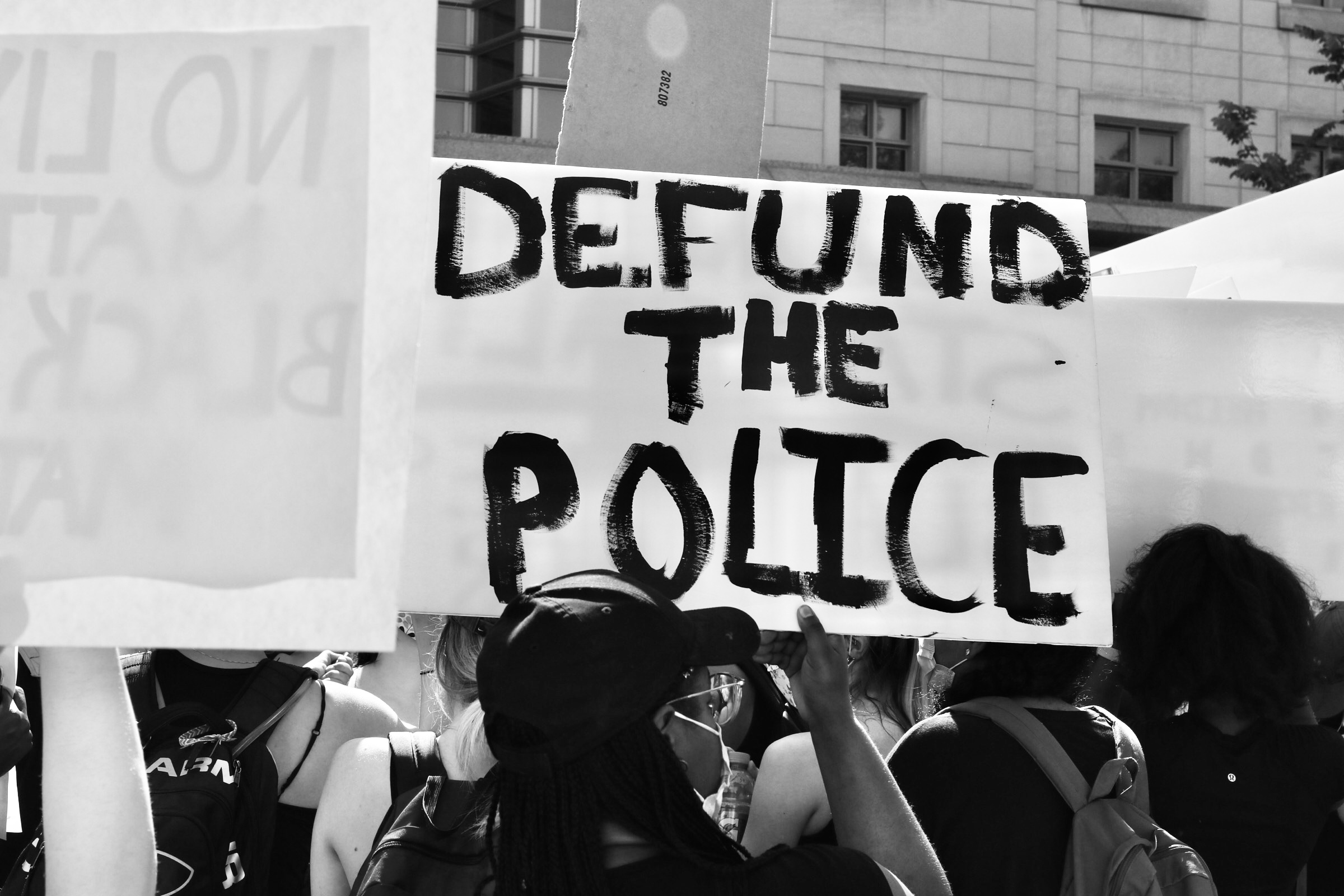
Black Lives Matter protest showing posters in favor of defunding the police and anti-police sentiments

In May 2016, FBI Director James Comey used the term "viral video effect" when commenting on significant increases in homicide rates in many large U.S. cities in the first half of the year. Comey specifically singled out the cities of Chicago (where murders were up 54 percent from 2015) and Las Vegas. The term was also used by Chuck Rosenberg, director of the DEA.

In October 2016, the Ferguson effect was cited in a case in which a Chicago police officer was beaten for several minutes by a suspect but chose not to draw her service weapon, worried of the media attention that would come if she were to shoot the suspect.

== Research ==
=== Crime ===
There exists a large volume of research contesting whether the Ferguson effect exists. Some studies, such as a 2017 study, found that violent crime was elevated and rose more in cities where concern about police violence was greatest. More specifically, a February 2016 University of Colorado Boulder study looked at crime statistics from 81 U.S. cities and found no evidence of a Ferguson effect with respect to overall, violent, or property crime, but identified an increase in robbery rates after the shooting of Michael Brown (while these rates decreased before this shooting). The study concluded that "any Ferguson Effect is constrained largely to cities with historically high levels of violence, a large composition of black residents, and socioeconomic disadvantages," indicating a Ferguson effect may exist, but only in certain regions, while other studies, such as another 2017 study, showed that after the shooting of Michael Brown, police traffic stops declined while hit rates went up on police searches in the state of Missouri. The study found no relationship between changes in police activity and crime rates, in direct contradiction to the previous study as it is concentrated in a region with historically high levels of violence.

Then again, a June 2016 University of Missouri study by Rosenfeld, published by the National Institute of Justice found there was an "unprecedented" 16.8% increase in homicides in 56 large cities over the course of 2015, and examined the Ferguson effect as one of three plausible explanations recommended for further research. Rosenfeld stated that "the only explanation that gets the timing right is a version of the Ferguson effect" and that it is his "leading hypothesis". On the other hand, a 2019 research study titled "De-policing as a consequence of the so-called 'Ferguson effect,'" a professor at the University of Pennsylvania, John M MacDonald, explored the relationship between arrests, de-policing, and homicide rates as a result of the police brutality in Ferguson, Missouri. This paper, referencing the Rosenfield and Wallman study, did not find a correlation between arrests and homicide rates in support of de-policing happening. No evidence was found to indicate the increase in homicides rates in 2015 were due to a change in the number of arrests, because the same police departments that exhibited an increase in arrests also resulted in an increase in homicides.

A study released in the spring of 2019 by a U.S. attorney general and another American attorney titled "Police-Worn Body Cameras: An Antidote to the 'Ferguson effect?'" researched the effects of implementing policy that would require U.S. police officers to wear body cameras as a means of counteracting the Ferguson effect. The study emphasized that the addition of police-worn body cameras could be an antidote to the de-policing that may be occurring as a result of the Ferguson effect, citing the theory of self-awareness. However, the study also brings attention to criticisms against the implementation of police-worn body cameras as a violation of privacy rights concerning bystanders in the video as well as the statutory protection of police recordings. Similarly, in April 2018, professors from Michigan State University and University of Nebraska at Omaha, Scott E. Wolfe and Justin Nix, conducted a study titled "Management-level officers' experiences with the Ferguson effect" in an effort to study factors that result from the Ferguson effect among police managers. This study was conducted by means of a survey in which police officers responded to a series of attributes that ranged from positive to negative in violent incidents. Police officers, both officers in the line of duty as well as those in management positions, are likely to express traits such as "less willingness to be proactive, reduced motivation, less job enjoyment, and a belief that crime will ultimately rise as officers 'de-police' attributed to the Ferguson effect. Thus, the basis of both of these studies is founded on the assumption that the Ferguson effect is real, instigating further research based on a contested theory.

On a different note, the following two studies focused their research efforts on the number of police reports, indicative of a change in policing behavior. In 2018, USA Today reported a sharp increase (63%) in Baltimore homicides after the local death of Freddie Grey in April 2015, showing 527 occurring in the three years prior, versus 859 in the three years following. This was accompanied by police taking an apparent blind eye to ordinary street crime, with a nearly 50% reduction in police reports of spotting potential violations themselves. In June 2020, Harvard economist Roland Fryer and Tanaya Devi released a paper showing evidence of the Ferguson effect. Across five cities where a deadly shooting that went viral preceded an investigation into crime and policing, they found that the violent crime rate increased, resulting in an additional 900 homicides and 34,000 excess felonies across two years. They suggest that this was caused by changes in the quantity of policing. Other theories, such as changes in community trust, were not supported by the data.

Looking more closely at the effects of police brutality and media coverage, a study titled "A 'Ferguson Effect' on 2016 Presidential Vote Preference? Findings from a Framing Experiment Examining 'Shy Voters' and Cues Related to Policing and Social Unrest," Wozniak et al. examines the effect of sociopolitical unrest and the rhetoric of crime on voters' decision in the 2020 presidential election. This study was conducted by determining whether showing an image that depicted police violence to a voter would influence their decision in the polls. The results of this study found that seeing an image of a police officer and a civilian increased the probability that an individual would exhibit voting preference and showing an image of aggravated and violent police officers would drastically change the voted-for candidate. However, in April 2019, Grace Ketron, in affiliation with the University of North Carolina at Chapel Hill, published the study "How Media Covered Police Shootings During and After Ferguson: Framing Analysis of Officer-Involved Shootings In 2014 and 2016." In this research, The New York Times, Fox News, and the Associated Press were examined as far as their portrayal of police shootings after the shootings of Michael Brown and Terence Crutcher in an effort to determine whether the media coverage of the police shootings was biased as it pertained to the role media plays in public perception. Her results show that the three news sources presented the shootings in a straightforward manner, using a neutral tone and equally representing both sides. Moreover, in September 2016, professors from Arizona State University, University of Nebraska at Omaha, and University of Louisville published a study on the change in number of violent assaults and murders of U.S. police officers due to the increase in anti-police sentiment following the events in Ferguson, Missouri. Despite reporters' claims that an increase in the number of murders of officers in the line of duty was due to the increased media attention on the "war on cops," the results of this research study found no evidence indicating an increase in the number of murders of U.S. police officers.

On the flip side, in January 2017, Campbell et al. released an article titled "Is the Number of Citizens Fatally Shot by Police Increasing in the Post-Ferguson Era?" examining the long-term change in the number of U.S. citizens killed by a fatal gunshot fired by police officers in the line of duty after Michael Brown Jr.'s death in Ferguson, Missouri. This study also found no significant evidence indicating a long-term increasing or decreasing pattern in fatally shot citizens by police officers. The number of fatally shot citizens is unstable with variable fluctuations in the short time spans. Furthermore, a study conducted by Galovski et al. titled "Exposure to Violence During Ferguson Protests: Mental Health Effects for Law Enforcement and Community Members: Effects of Exposure to Violence in Ferguson" in August 2016 seeking to observe whether there exists a relationship between closeness to community violence and the mental health of both police officers in the line of duty and all other community members. Closer proximity to community violence results in changes in mental health. Community members were more affected than police officers and Black members of the community were more affected from the violence in Ferguson than white community members.

Overall, the research does not point to a decisive answer to the question of whether the Ferguson effect exists up to this date. A March 2016 study by Johns Hopkins University researchers Stephen L. Morgan and Joel Pally noted a large decline in arrests and a spike in violent crime in Baltimore after the death of Freddie Gray, consistent with a Ferguson effect. However, they highlighted certain qualifications and caveats that made it unclear whether the crime spike should be regarded as evidence of a Ferguson effect. In March 2017, Stephen Edward Simonds Jr. as part of Towson University published "The Ferguson Effect—Are Police Anxieties to Blame?" in order to study de-policing in Burlington, Vermont, Montgomery County, Maryland, and Philadelphia, Pennsylvania. This research found insufficient evidence to support the theory of the Ferguson effect and concludes that one limitation on this study is the lack of transparency in the Public Data Initiative. Furthermore, this study implies that future studies should move their focus from crime and arrest data to de-policing and outlook of police officers in the line of duty.

In May 2020, the murder of George Floyd, a Black man, by a White police officer in Minneapolis led to widespread protests and unrest. Some criminalists suggested that in the aftermath of protests and riots, the city experienced a "Minneapolis Effect", which alluded to the "Ferguson Effect" hypothesis, where less-active policing was theorized to have contributed to increases in the rates of homicides and other violent crimes.

=== Negative publicity of police ===
A 2017 study surveyed officers in a police department in the southeastern U.S., and found that they believed negative publicity of police negatively affects civilians enough to increase crime rates. The study also found negative publicity increases officers' perceptions of a police legitimacy crisis and fear of being falsely accused of misconduct. This, in turn, causes police officers to reduce their proactive policing. According to Vox, "a 1999 study by criminologist Robert Ankony found that when police feel more alienated from, and negatively toward, members of the community, they're more likely to retreat from 'proactive' policing and do only what they need to do to respond to crimes." However, the relationship between a community and its police force goes both ways and, thus, Black people also pull back from calling the police. A 2016 study by sociologists Matthew Desmond and Andrew V. Papachristos concluded that black people were afraid to call 911 after a heavily publicized violent beating of an unarmed black man by white police officers. After the police beating of Frank Jude in October 2004 was reported in the Milwaukee Journal Sentinel, there was a 17% drop in 911 calls, and a 32% increase in homicides. "Our research suggests that this happened not because the police 'got fetal' but because many members of the black community stopped calling 911, their trust in the justice system in tatters," they wrote. However, another study, "Do Police Brutality Stories Reduce 911 Calls? Reassessing an Important Criminological Finding" by Michael Zoorob conducted in January 2020, contradicts the previous study in that it reassesses the popular assertion that 911 calls decreased and homicides increased due to the police brutality instance in Wisconsin, concluding that there is no support to back up the claim that media coverage of police brutality stories decreases crime reporting and increases homicides.

A 2015 study found "there may also be a Ferguson Effect on other aspects of police officers' jobs" that made police officers less willing to engage in community partnership. The study also suggested that officers who have confidence in their authority and perceive their police department as fair are more willing to partner with their communities, "regardless of the effects of negative publicity". Likewise, a December 2016 study found that police deputies who thought their supervisors were more fair were less likely to perceive danger, be unmotivated, or think that civilian attitudes toward the police have become more cynical since the shooting of Michael Brown.

An article by amnesty.org released in August 2020 reports, "The unnecessary and sometimes excessive use of force by police against protesters exhibits the very systemic racism and impunity they had taken to the streets to protest," adding to the negative publicity of police in a summary of multiple human rights violations. This article also presents images that show a militarized police force in confrontation with unarmed individuals that evokes emotion from the reader. The police officers on duty are captured carrying a large wooden weapon in their hands in addition to their regular equipment as well as wearing masks while the citizens raise their fists in defiance.

The negative publicity of police officers extends beyond the coverage of specific instances of police brutality to that of city-wide police departments that fail to hold their police officers accountable when found guilty. One particular example of this is detailed in Police Brutality by Marshall Miller in which the Louima case in New York City instigates a federal investigation into the police department in an attempt to find whether they are tolerant of police officers who abuse their positions of authority. However, a 2006 study titled "Experimentally manipulating race: Perceptions of police brutality in an arrest: A research note" by Jack Levin and Alexander R. Thomas brings attention to a different aspect of media portrayal of instances of police brutality. Specifically, drawing attention to the fact, through the research of their study, that people, both Black and white, are "significantly more likely to see violence and illegality when both arresting officers were white."

== Criticism ==
William Bratton, the then–New York City Police Commissioner, said in 2015 that he had seen no evidence of a "Ferguson effect" in his city. U.S. Attorney General Loretta Lynch testified before Congress on November 17, 2015, that there was "no data" to support claims that the Ferguson effect existed. According to Slate, Ronald L. Davis, a former police chief and the executive director of President Obama's Task Force on 21st Century Policing, testified at the same hearing that the notion that police would fail to do their jobs because they were scared was "an insult to the profession". In December 2015, Edward A. Flynn, police chief of Milwaukee, Wisconsin, said that although police were unnerved due to anti-police protests, this was not solely responsible for the increase in violent crime observed in his city recently, because rates of such crimes there started increasing before Michael Brown was shot.

President Obama also said in a 2015 speech to the International Association of Chiefs of Police that although gun violence and homicides had spiked in some U.S. cities, "so far at least across the nation, the data shows that we are still enjoying historically low rates of violent crime", and "What we can't do is cherry-pick data or use anecdotal evidence to drive policy or to feed political agendas."
