= Tommy Norman =

American former policeman

- Born: August 22, 1972 (age 54); Levy, North Little Rock, Arkansas, U.S.
- Education: Ole Main High School
- Known for: Community policing, charitable actions towards youth
- Police career
- Allegiance: United States
- Department: North Little Rock Police Department
- Service years: 1998–2025
- Status: Retired
- Rank: Police Officer
- Awards: Presidential Lifetime Achievement Award (2021)

Tommy Norman (born August 22, 1972) is an American retired police officer who worked for the North Little Rock Police Department from 1998 to 2025. He was decertified as a police officer in August 2026 after numerous controversial discoveries, and chose not to contest the ruling.{{ https://www.arkansasonline.com/news/2026/aug/05/former-north-little-rock-police-officer-tommy/

Though Norman has garnered praise for his community policing, he has also faced controversy, including an arrest for domestic assault and multiple allegations of improper conduct with underaged girls. He fathered a child with a 15-year-old girl in the mid 1990s.

== Early life and education ==
Norman was born to parents Modena and Dean Norman, and he graduated from Ole Main High School in 1990. Between 1991 and 1998, he worked many jobs in the nursing and mental health field. He worked as a Certified Nursing Assistant at Riley's Oak Hill Manor Nursing Home. Norman was also a mental health worker at Pinnacle Point Hospital.

Norman has three children and eight siblings.

== Career ==
Norman is known for positive community policing. Norman's unorthodox approach to policing includes thousands of video posts, pictures and daily interactive engagement at the Boys & Girls Clubs and the Police Athletic League with those that he protects and serves. He is credited for doing things like presenting 50 NLRSD students with backpacks and $50 gift cards from Shoe Carnival in August to purchase shoes, starting the “Shop with a Cop” program to help financially struggling students or just dancing with the children. In September 2025, Officer Norman was arrested on one count of Domestic Violence in the 3rd degree and was being held on no bond according to KARK in Little Rock, Arkansas.

== National reception ==
Norman has gained national and international attention for his unconventional methods of law enforcement. The national and international exposé of Tommy Norman came from a televised CNN News cable program on May 10, 2015, during an interview on Newsroom with its host Brooke Baldwin and her guest Atlanta activist and rapper Killer Mike. Killer Mike professed that Norman is "doing something right" and that is connecting with inner city youth, in particular minority communities of color.

He was also featured on The Today Show on November 8, 2015. This report featured some of the day-to-day activities he does with the neighborhood and specifically how he is well liked by children. Reporter Kerry Sanders has coined the term “Social Media Cop” for him.
