= Peelian principles =

Theses describing an ethical police force

1888 pamphlet by George Fraser Black

The Peelian principles are a set of theses, attributed to the statesman Sir Robert Peel, defining an ethical police force's conduct. In law, it is known as policing by consent, with the concept being invoked in law enforcement in the United Kingdom, as well as Ireland, Australia and New Zealand. The Peelian principles regard police officers as effectively citizens in uniform exercising their powers to police their fellow citizens, with their implicit consent, both collectively and individually. "Policing by consent" indicates that the legitimacy of policing in the eyes of the public is based upon a consensus of support that follows from transparency about their powers, their integrity in exercising those powers, and their accountability for doing so.

It is contested as to whether Peel first wrote or conceived of the theses, with elements from texts by Richard Mayne and Charles Rowan, joint Commissioners of the Metropolitan Police which Peel founded, cited in studies as being repeated and misattributed, especially Mayne's "New Police Instructions" printed in The Times in 1829.

== Historical background ==
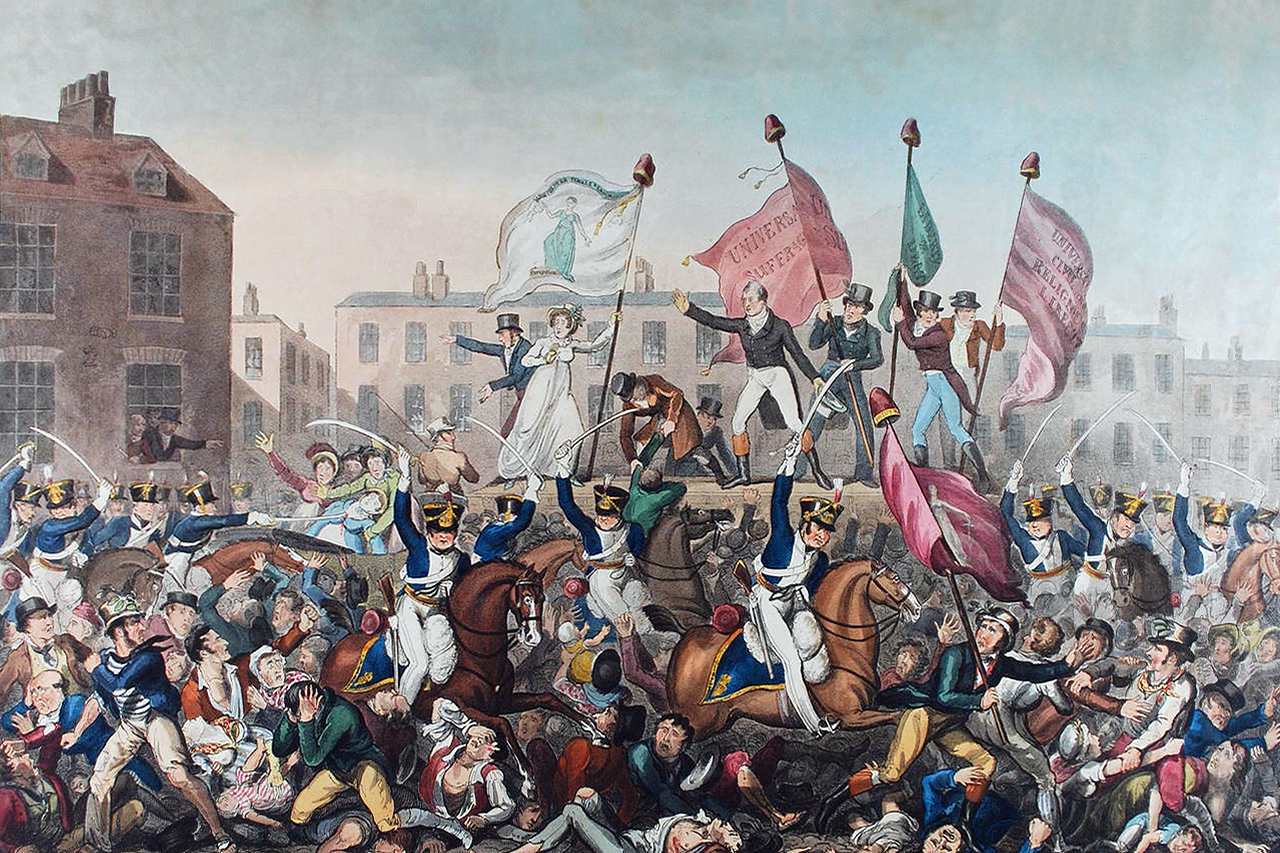
The Peterloo massacre, depicted here by Richard Carlile in 1819, was one of the conflicts between the people and the authorities in Britain before the Peelian principles were adopted.

In early 19th century Britain, the London government made notable attempts to set up a police force, which were met with civilian opposition. Suspicion towards the scale and intimidation of an armed police force, and fears that it could be used to suppress protest or support unpopular rule, prevailed. Britain had been at war with France since 1793, with the latter being home to the best-known, best-organised and best-paid police force at the time, as well as a secret and political police force, and many Britons were uncomfortable with any police force's association with France. Skepticism shown to proposals of a British police force mainly concerned a disagreement with the insinuation that it was the job of the national government to set up and control a police force, rather than one under democratic and local control.

Following the end of the Napoleonic Wars in 1816, several factors drove the country into a severe depression. The increased industrialisation of the country, combined with the demobilisation of the forces, led to mass unemployment. The Corn Laws led to massive increases in the price of bread, while the repeal of income tax meant that the war debt had to be recovered by taxing commodities forcing their prices even higher. In addition, 1817 was unusually wet and cold, producing a very poor harvest. This led to the so-called Pentrich rising, for which three men were hanged and beheaded at Derby Gaol.

The 1819 Peterloo Massacre in St Peter's Field, Manchester occurred when at least eighteen died after 60,000 people who had gathered to stand up for universal suffrage (amongst other ideas) were overrun by multiple cavalry charges. This was followed by the 1820 Yorkshire West Riding Revolt and the 1821 Cinderloo Uprising, the latter of which resulted in two deaths and one man hanged subsequently. It was against this background that Peel said that "though emancipation was a great danger, civil strife was a greater danger" and thus the principles known as Peel's were developed.

== Sir Robert Peel's principles ==
=== Development ===
London in the early 19th century had a population of nearly a million and a half people but was policed by only 450 constables and 4,500 night watchmen who belonged to many separate organisations. Several parliamentary committees examined the policing of London and made proposals to help evolve the existing state of affairs. The concept of professional policing was taken up by Robert Peel when he became Home Secretary in 1822, emphasising a rigorous and less discretionary approach to law enforcement. Peel's Metropolitan Police Act 1829 established a full-time, professional and centrally-organised police force for the Greater London area, known as the Metropolitan Police.

The Peelian principles describe the philosophy that Sir Robert Peel developed to define an ethical police force. The principles traditionally ascribed to Peel state that:

- Whether the police are effective is not measured on the number of arrests, but on the lack of crime.
- Above all else, an effective authority figure knows trust and accountability are paramount. Hence, Peel's most often quoted principle that "The police are the public and the public are the police."

The Metropolitan Police officers were often referred to as 'Bobbies' after Sir Robert (Bobby) Peel, and are often regarded (incorrectly) as the first modern police force.

=== The nine principles of policing ===
The nine principles of policing originated from the "General Instructions" issued to every new police officer in the Metropolitan Police from 1829. The Home Office suggests that the instructions were probably written, not by Peel himself, but by Charles Rowan and Richard Mayne, the joint Commissioners of the Metropolitan Police when it was founded. Although Peel discussed the spirit of some of these principles in his speeches and other communications, the historians Susan Lentz and Robert Chaires found no proof that he compiled a formal list, and those he did discuss were likely based on pre-existing ideas.

Those general principles were later distilled into nine points by Charles Reith in his 1948 book A Short History of the British Police and it is in this form they are usually cited:

1. To prevent crime and disorder, as an alternative to their repression by military force and severity of legal punishment.
2. To recognise always that the power of the police to fulfil their functions and duties is dependent on public approval of their existence, actions and behaviour, and on their ability to secure and maintain public respect.
3. To recognise always that to secure and maintain the respect and approval of the public means also the securing of the willing co-operation of the public in the task of securing observance of laws.
4. To recognise always that the extent to which the co-operation of the public can be secured diminishes proportionately the necessity of the use of physical force and compulsion for achieving police objectives.
5. To seek and preserve public favour, not by pandering to public opinion, but by constantly demonstrating absolutely impartial service to law, in complete independence of policy, and without regard to the justice or injustice of the substance of individual laws, by ready offering of individual service and friendship to all members of the public without regard to their wealth or social standing, by ready exercise of courtesy and friendly good humour, and by ready offering of individual sacrifice in protecting and preserving life.
6. To use physical force only when the exercise of persuasion, advice and warning is found to be insufficient to obtain public co-operation to an extent necessary to secure observance of law or to restore order, and to use only the minimum degree of physical force which is necessary on any particular occasion for achieving a police objective.
7. To maintain at all times a relationship with the public that gives reality to the historic tradition that the police are the public and that the public are the police, the police being only members of the public who are paid to give full-time attention to duties which are incumbent on every citizen in the interests of community welfare and existence.
8. To recognise always the need for strict adherence to police-executive functions, and to refrain from even seeming to usurp the powers of the judiciary of avenging individuals or the State, and of authoritatively judging guilt and punishing the guilty.
9. To recognise always that the test of police efficiency is the absence of crime and disorder, and not the visible evidence of police action in dealing with them.

=== Legitimacy ===
The presence of police officers on the streets of London, a new symbol of state power, raised questions about police legitimacy from the outset. The government sought to avoid any suggestion that the police was a military force, so they were not armed. Nor was their uniform anything like military uniform.

At the time, local government had a much more significant role in the day-to-day life of citizens. Initially, many sections of society were opposed to the 'new' police. Uncertainty about what they could and could not do was responsible for many of the early complaints about the police.

Officers acted as a unique point of contact between the state and the wider public. The legitimacy of this expanded state power was reflected in public opinion about the police. As the nineteenth century progressed, the police were viewed in a more favourable light by many sections of society. Still, even in the twentieth century, tensions remained.

== Policing by consent ==
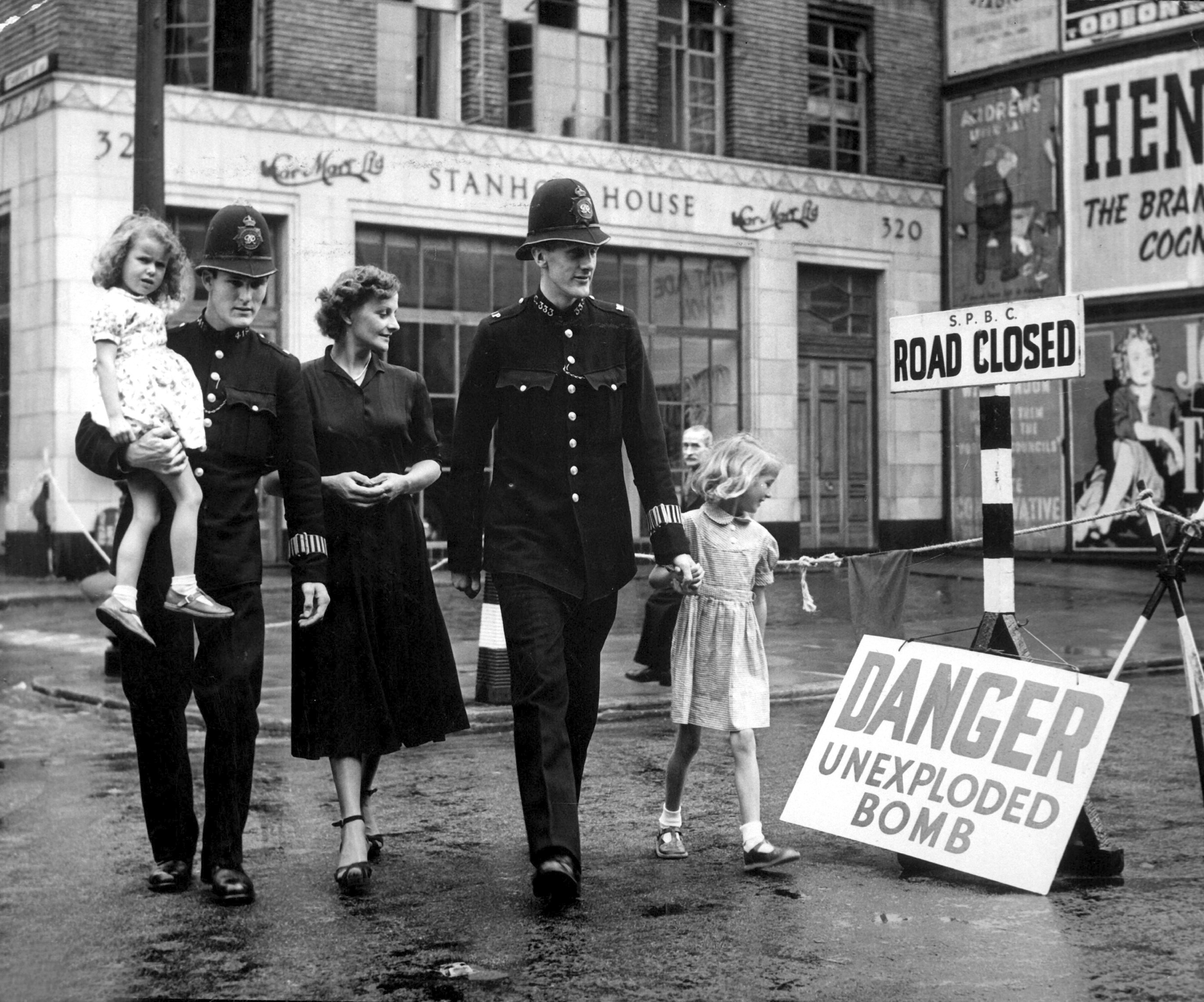
Co-operation between police and public in post-war London, c. 1948

=== Public co-operation ===
The historian Charles Reith explained in his New Study of Police History (1956) that Sir Robert Peel's principles constituted an approach to policing "unique in history and throughout the world, because it derived, not from fear, but almost exclusively from public co-operation with the police, induced by them designedly by behaviour which secures and maintains for them the approval, respect and affection of the public".

The UK government Home Office in 2012 explained policing by consent as "the power of the police coming from the common consent of the public, as opposed to the power of the state. It does not mean the consent of an individual" and added an additional statement outside of the Peelian principles: "No individual can choose to withdraw his or her consent from the police, or from a law." The Home Office defined the legitimacy of policing, in the eyes of the public, as based upon a general consensus of support that follows from transparency about their powers, their integrity in exercising those powers and their accountability for doing so.

A study in 2021 described the notion of policing by consent in three terms: "that the police are 'citizens in uniform'; that the primary duty of the police is to the public, not the state; and that the use of force is a last resort." Another study contrasts policing by consent with 'policing by law' and states: "Even though the basic premise of policing in UK is by consent, the British Police system as it exists now is more a reverse process of investing more power in people by law, than policing by consent. As such, the policing in UK has now become policing by law, but a law which mandates a police which is accountable to public."

=== International influence ===
The custodian helmet used by the Metropolitan Police Service in London

The influence of this philosophy can still be found today in many parts of the Commonwealth of Nations, including Canada, Australia, and New Zealand. It is also seen in the police forces of the Crown dependencies and British Overseas Territories. The British model of policing influenced policing in the United States; the principles informed the American community policing movement in the 1960s and are still a component of more recent policing doctrine. American law-enforcement reformer William Bratton called them "my bible" in 2014, but others commented in 2020 that the application of the principles in the US appears "increasingly theoretical". The term is sometimes applied to describe policing in the Republic of Ireland, and in Northern Ireland. During a period of time when Hong Kong was a British colony, and for a time afterwards, the concept of policing by consent was applied, but some argue that the approach has since faded out. The concept has been applied to other countries as well, whose police forces are routinely unarmed.

Some countries, such as Finland, Norway and other Nordic countries developed a consensual model of policing independently of the Peelian principles.

=== Public-order policing ===
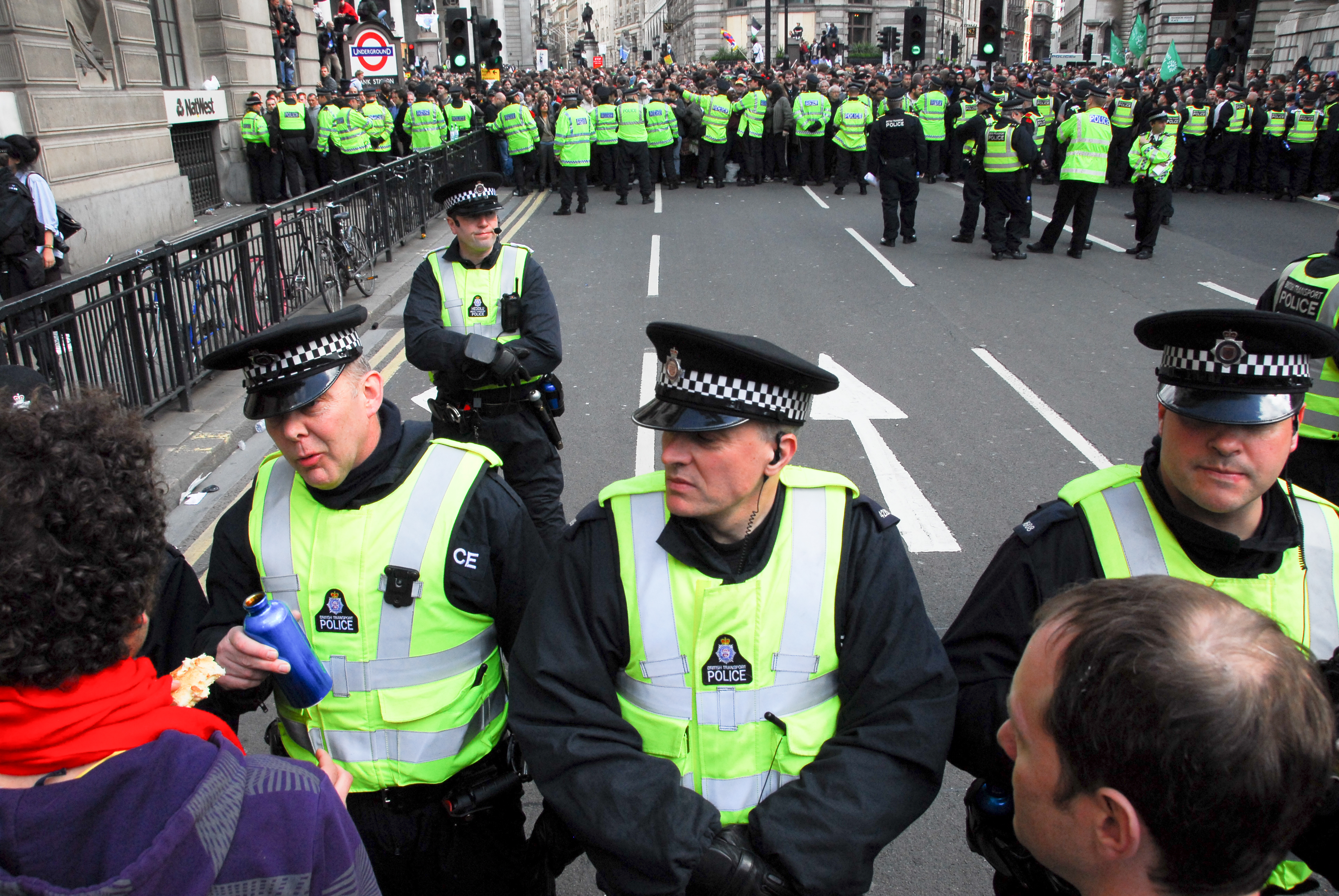
The principle of consent has led to a distinctive approach to public-order policing, as here at the G20 protests in London in 2009.

As a result of the tradition of policing by consent, the United Kingdom has a different approach to policing public-order crime, such as riots, as compared to other western countries, such as France. Nonetheless, public order policing presents challenges to the approach of policing by consent. The death of Ian Tomlinson after being struck by a police officer during the 2009 G-20 summit protests sparked a debate in the UK about the relationship between the police, media and public, and the independence of the Independent Police Complaints Commission. In response to the concerns, the Chief Inspector of Constabulary, Denis O'Connor, published a 150-page report in November 2009 that aimed to restore Britain's consent-based model of policing.

Policing by consent remained a central consideration for police in the United Kingdom and Republic of Ireland while enforcing temporary laws during the COVID-19 pandemic.

=== Police use of firearms ===
Calls for the routine arming of police officers with firearms have consistently been resisted in the United Kingdom. With a long history of unarmed policing, police use of firearms in the United Kingdom is much more limited than in many other countries. The UK is one of only 19 nations which have police forces that are routinely unarmed; these countries also have comparatively restrictive rules on civilian gun ownership. The increased use of tasers in the UK was recognised as a fundamental shift in policing, and criticised as damaging policing by consent. One study wrote that the "fact that officers operate largely unarmed is a key tenet and manifestation of [policing by consent]." Terror attacks in the UK and Europe have led to increased deployment of firearms officers; the same study found more negative responses in the UK to police when they are armed. In Finland, police are armed but may not fire without direct permission, that is, they are armed but not by default authorised.

=== Training of police officers ===
In Finland and Norway, two countries with an emphasis on a consent-based model of policing, recruits study at national colleges and spend time on an internship with local police, in addition to earning degrees in criminal justice or related fields. In these two countries, there are rigorous rules about what is considered justified use of force.

== See also ==
- History of law enforcement in the United Kingdom
- History of the Metropolitan Police Service
- Law enforcement in the United Kingdom
- Police and crime commissioner
- Preventive police
