= Charles Reith =

Scottish police historian

Charles Edward Williams Reith (27 November 1886 - 7 February 1957) was a Scottish police historian, best known for distilling the thought of Robert Peel into nine principles in his 1948 book A short history of the British police. He worked in Sri Lanka as a tea- and rubber- planter, where he joined the Ceylon Planters' Rifle Corps and on its disbandment rose to Captain in the Indian Army Reserve of Officers.

== Works ==
- An Ensign of the 19th Foot. A novel, etc, 1925
- The Police Idea, 1938
- Police Principles and the Problem of War, 1940
- British Police and the Democratic Ideal, 1943
- A short history of the British police, 1948
- Comparative systems of law-enforcement, 1948
- The Blind Eye of History. A study of the origins of the present police era, 1952
- A New Study of Police History, 1956
