= Police firearm use by country =

A Guatemalan police officer holds a suspect at gunpoint during an exercise

The use of firearms by police forces varies widely across the world, in part due to differences in gun use policy, civilian firearm laws, and recording of police activity. Some police forces may require that officers use warning shots or verbal warnings before employing deadly force, and others may prohibit officers from carrying firearms while performing tasks such as highway patrol where gun use is not expected.

== Unarmed police forces ==
Countries and territories with routinely unarmed police officers

In eighteen countries or territories, the police do not carry firearms unless the situation is expected to merit it: Botswana, Cook Islands, Fiji, Iceland, Ireland, Kiribati, Malawi, Marshall Islands, Nauru, New Zealand, Niue, Samoa, Solomon Islands, Tonga, Tuvalu, the United Kingdom (except for Northern Ireland), the British Virgin Islands and Vanuatu. These countries exhibit gun-homicide rates markedly lower on average than countries with armed police forces. Their police forces commonly adopt a philosophy of policing by consent.

In China, police also do not carry guns on standard patrol.

A survey conducted in Great Britain in 2004 found that 47% of citizens supported arming all police while 48% were opposed to the idea.

== By country ==
=== Australia ===
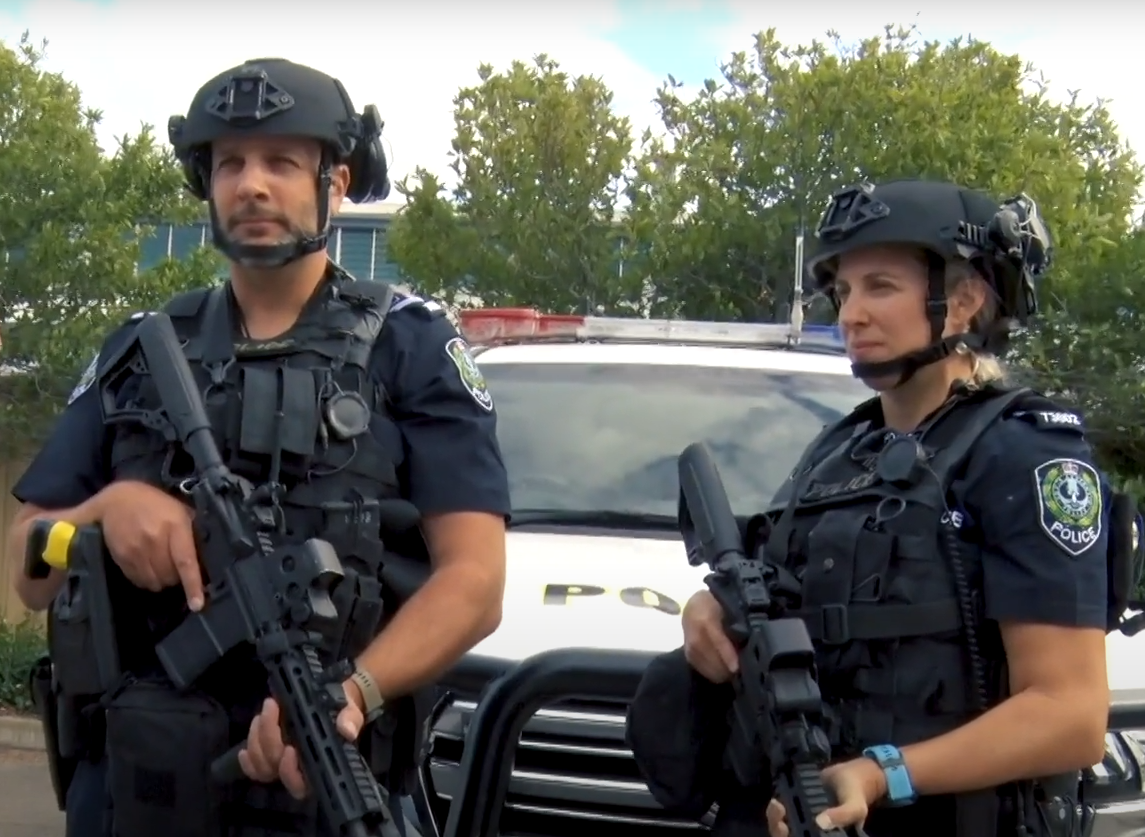
Specialist officers armed with assault rifles of the South Australia Police

All police officers in Australia carry firearms which are personally issued to them. This usually includes detectives and highway patrol officers. The firearm most commonly issued is the Glock semi-automatic handgun. The Australian police forces are monitored by the Australian Institute of Criminology, which has recorded police shooting deaths since 1989. All fatal police shootings are subject to a mandatory coronial inquest. A 2013 review by the Australian Institute of Criminology found that 42% of victims of fatal police shootings had a mental illness. A more recent history of deaths by police shootings is tabulated below.

	2000/1	2001/2	2002/3	2003/4	2004/5	2005/6	2006/7	2007/8	2008/9
People killed^{1}	3	2	5	7	6	3	3	3	5

	2009/10	2010/11	2011/12	2012/13	2013/14	2014/15	2015/16	2016/17
People killed^{1}	3	6	4	1	3	10	5	4

1.Data provided by the Australian Institute of Criminology

=== Austria ===
Police in Austria usually carry firearms, including Glock pistols. They are monitored by the Austrian Interior Ministry. Since 2006, the records of police firearm use have been expanded to show whether or not a round was targeted at people.

	2000	2001	2002	2003	2004	2005	2006	2007	2008	2009	2010	2011
Rounds discharged	133	105	172	177	143	121	147	107	120	111	74	81
Rounds targeted at people	-	-	-	-	-	-	9	6	6	7	4	4
Minor injuries	1	1	-^{1}	2	1	1	1	1	1	0	0	0
Major injuries	6	3	-^{1}	14	4	3	5	6	5	3	3	1
People killed	0	0	0	0	X	1	X	X	X	X	X	X

1.10 injuries, severity not specified.

Data reported on by Heute

=== Czech Republic ===
All uniformed police officers belonging to the Police of the Czech Republic (PČR) and all Municipal police departments usually carry firearms. Most officers are equipped with CZ 75D Compact pistols. The use of firearms by police officers belonging to the PČR is regulated by the Act no. 273/2008 Sb. (Act on the Police of the Czech Republic), which defines the ways an officer can use his service weapon and states that a police officer of the PČR is not a subject to the Act no. 119/2002 Sb. (Act on Firearms and ammunition) and as such doesn't have to possess a weapons licence.

The use by officers belonging to a municipal police department is regulated by the Act no. 119/2002 Sb. therefore they need to possess the appropriate weapons licence. The use is further regulated by the Act no. 553/1991 Sb. (Act on the Municipal Police), which gives officers more rights regarding the use of a firearm, such as the right to open carry.

The regulation for the Municipal Police is generally more strict than the regulation for PČR and doesn't give municipal police officers the same rights as PČR officers.

Table below only includes the statistics for PČR officers and doesn't include municipal police departments.

	2013	2014	2015	2016	2017	2018	2019	2020
Threat by a pointed weapon	-	-	945	812	1126	982	1079	824^{1}
Warning shots	-	-	70	54	37	60	77	40^{1}
Total shots fired for effect	28	30	29	29	26	27	26	19^{1}
Of which at a person:	5	2	3	8	1	3^{2}	-	-
a vehicle:	16	18	18	12	11	13^{2}	-	-
an animal:	7	10	8	9	14	5^{2}	-	-

1.Data until 31st of August
2.Data until 13th of November

Data reported on by the Police of the Czech Republic

=== Denmark ===
Since 1965, all Danish police officers have carried firearms when performing their duties. Danish police used Walther PPK 7.65 mm as the standard pistol until 2000, and then the Heckler & Koch USP 9 mm was introduced. In 2008 police began to carry pepper spray in addition to their firearm. Further, all officers are trained in the use of Heckler & Koch MP5, which is issued on special assignments or severe incidents.

Additionally, every police district have specially trained "Reaktionspatruljer" deployed round the clock, carrying the 5.56 × 45 mm NATO GV M/10.

The appropriate use of firearms is described in the Act on Police Activities regulations, section 16 and 17 is translated into English in.

- 16.
  - (1) The police may use force only if necessary and justified and only by such means and to such extent as are reasonable relative to the interest which the police seek to protect. Any assessment of the justifiability of such force must also take into account whether the use of force involves any risk of bodily harm to third parties.
  - (2) Force must be used as considerately as possible under the circumstances and so as to minimise any bodily harm.
- 17.
  - (1) Firearms may only be used:
    - (i) to avert an on-going or imminent dangerous assault on a person;
    - (ii) to avert other imminent danger to the lives of persons or of such persons incurring grievous bodily harm [...]
    - (iv) to secure the apprehension of persons who have or are suspected on reasonable grounds of having commenced or committed a dangerous assault on another person unless the risk that such persons will commit another such assault is deemed not to exist;
  - (2) Before the police fire shots involving a risk of harm to a person, the person must be informed in so far as possible, first by shouted warnings and then by warning shots, that the police intend to fire if police orders are not observed. It must also be ensured, in so far as possible, that the person is able to observe the order.
  - (3) In case of an obvious risk of hitting third parties, shots may only be fired as a last resort [...]
  - (5) If police shooting has caused harm to a person, the person must immediately be examined by a doctor.

In Denmark the police use of weapons is recorded by the police department. The police department classifies tear gas as the use of a firearm. In 2006 the death of four people by police shootings prompted an investigation into the use of firearms by the Danish police force from 1996 to 2006. The investigation found no significant trends of increased firearms use by the police.

	1996	1997	1998	1999	2000	2001	2002	2003	2004	2005	2006
Cases of firearm use	222	276	196	216	234	242	269	305	269	243	253
Reports of shots fired^{1}	15	18	7	10	11	22	17	10	18	15	20
Reports of shots aimed at civilians^{2}	7	7	4	5	3	12	7	3	4	2	11
People hit	7	3	4	3	3	7	5	3	3	2	11
People wounded	6	3	4	3	3	4	3	2	3	2	7
People killed	1	0	0	0	0	3	2	1	0	0	4

1.Includes warning shots and tear gas fired.
2.Includes shots aimed at vehicle tyres.

More recent figures have been published separately in a different format.

	2009	2010	2011	2012	2013	2014
Cases of firearm use	361	305	277	260	323	315
Rounds discharged	32	39	86	49	58	53
Warning shots	11	6	49	6	12	17

=== Finland ===
Police in Finland have access to weapons including a Glock 17, Heckler & Koch MP5, Taser and pepper spray. The use of firearms is recorded by the Police College and the Finnish ministry of the Interior.

	2003	2004	2005	2006	2007	2008	2009	2010	2011	2012	2013
Incidents firearms were used	39	26	36	27	41	44	32	40	34	39	27
Firearm was threatened	31	23	25	20	28	39	30	32	24	33	19
Rounds fired	10	3	11	7	9	5	3	13	48	7	6
Warning shots	10	3	7	4	3	3	2	5	1	0	2
People killed	0	0	0	0	0	0	1	1	0	0	0
People wounded	0	0	3	3	3	2	1	2	1	1	4

Data reported on by YLE uutiset

=== France ===
French police carry firearms; however, there is no official record of how frequently firearms are used. An independent group A Toutes Les Victimes has tracked the number of deaths and injuries by police which have been published in the media since 2005. In 2021 the National Assembly passed Article 25, allowing French police officers to carry service firearms while off-duty, though their use remains strictly limited to defense of self and others.

	2005	2006	2007	2008	2009	2010	2011	2012
Number of deaths^{1}	6	10	19	11	6	9	10	14
Number of injuries^{1}	3	7	2	7	5	4	0	4

1Unofficial data from the A Toutes Les Victimes census

=== Germany ===
German police forces usually carry firearms. Police firearm statistics dating back to 1984 are available, a summary of recent years is tabulated below.

	2010	2011	2012	2013	2014	2015	2016	2017	2018	2019	2020	2021	2022
Warning shots	59	49	54	41	65	48	32	61	49	44	49	60	48
Firearm use on objects	10	30	14	17	22	13	28	8	19	29	35	28	26
Firearm use on people	37	36	36	42	46	40	52	75	56	64	75	51	60
Injuries	23	15	20	20	31	22	28	39	34	30	41	31	41
Deaths	8	6	8	8	7	10	11	14	11	15	15	8	11

=== Iceland ===
Icelandic police officers do not regularly carry firearms, although all receive firearms training. In 2013 the first fatal police shooting took place where one man was killed. As of October 2019 this remains the only fatal police shooting since Iceland became an independent republic in 1944.

=== Ireland ===
The strength of the Garda Síochána (national police) is approximately 15,000 officers, most of whom are unarmed; approximately 4,000 are authorised to carry firearms.

The majority of armed Gardaí (officers) consist of ordinary detectives (routinely armed with handguns for personal protection) or belong to specialist regional Armed Support Units. An elite national Emergency Response Unit exists that is trained in hostage rescue tactics.

There were six fatal shootings by Gardaí between 1998 and 2021.

=== Italy ===
The members of all three National law enforcement forces of Italy – the civilian Polizia di Stato, the Carabinieri national gendarmerie, and the Guardia di Finanza – normally carry firearms on duty; to date, the standard service sidearm is the Beretta M92-FS, but the Carabinieri and the Guardia di Finanza in the past few years have either supplemented or started to phase it out with more compact pistols such as the Beretta 8000 and the Beretta PX4 Storm, and to a lesser extent, the Beretta APX since 2020.

Members of national police forces are also allowed to retain their service pistol and carry it when off-duty, all through the national territory; due to the large size and weight of the Beretta 92, which makes it difficult to carry concealed in most of the Country during the Summer, Law 80/2025 was passed on June 9, 2025, allowing members of the Polizia di Stato, Carabinieri and Guardia di Finanza to privately purchase firearms to carry off-duty without additional licenses.

Patrol officers are also issued submachine-guns when on duty, usually at the rate of one per two-men car. The standard issue submachine-gun is the Beretta PM12-S, but the newer Beretta PMX started to phase it out in Italian law enforcement service in 2018.

Other firearms – including Benelli and Franchi semi-automatic and pump-action shotguns, Beretta assault rifles and more – are kept in armories at police stations for deployment in case of severe emergencies such as active shooter situations or terror attacks.

Officers on patrol are also equipped with truncheons of different kinds, and, since 2022, have access to the Axon X2 Taser. The TW-1000 RSG6W pepper spray has been adopted and is in service since 2017.

Elite units have access to a broader range of firearms and weaponry.

The Polizia Locale – small local law enforcement departments operated by each individual municipality and generally tasked to enforce urban regulations, control traffic, and deal with petty antisocial behaviour – can be issued with pistols if their city's local police regulation allows them to do so. In that case, they can carry their issued firearm when off-duty only within the confines of their municipality. Each Polizia Locale decides which firearm to adopt among the many available on the Italian civilian firearms market, so the type and caliber of handguns used can vary wildly all through the Country.

The use of firearms by all local and national law enforcement is regulated by Article 53 of the Italian Criminal Code, which allows officers to use weapons for self-defense, in case of resistance, or to prevent suspects from committing the crimes of murder, armed robbery, kidnapping, or mass casualty attacks including large-scale terror attacks, volountary shipwreck, train wreck, or hijacking.

=== Jamaica ===
The majority of police officers in Jamaica are trained in the use of firearms. The main service firearm used by Jamaican police, particularly the Jamaica Constabulary Force has changed over time. In recent years, the JCF has predominantly employed the Glock 17 as its regular service pistol. Constables assigned to the Specialized Operations Branch (Jamaican equivalent of a SWAT team) have been seen carrying M16 and M4 carbine assault rifles.

The Jamaica Constabulary Force's (JCF) use of lethal force has been monitored by Amnesty International. From 1983 to 2000 the Jamaican police force has been reported to kill between 121 and 355 people each year with an average of 171 deaths. A subsequent report by Amnesty USA shows that from 1998 to 2015 between 101 and 307 people were killed each year with an average of 192 deaths. In 2010, the Independent Commission of Investigations (INDECOM) was established as an independent oversight body to tackle the frequent use of lethal force by members of the Security Forces, which has made progress towards reducing the problem. A summary of recent years is tabulated below:

Jamaica's Security Force shooting fatalities 2011–2017
2011	2012	2013	2014	2015	2016	2017
210	219	258	115	101	111	168

=== Japan ===
Uniformed officers carry firearms, typically the New Nambu M60 revolver while on duty only. Security Police and Special Assault Team carry semi-automatic pistols and heavier submachine guns and rifles depending on the situation.

=== Netherlands ===
Law enforcement in the Netherlands usually carry firearms. In every incident where a firearm round is shot and/or hits a person there is an investigation conducted to determine if the use of a firearm was justified. The results of the investigations are made publicly available; the cases for each year are tabulated.

Data from firearms use investigations
	2009	2010	2011	2012	2013	2014	2015	2016	2017	2018	2019	2020	2021	2022 (first half)
Number of incidents	30	33	33	24	30	25	23	34	23	27	16	22	21	8
People wounded	29	31	31	19	29	24	27	33	20	26	12	18	25	7
People killed	0	2	2	5	5	3	3	4	3	3	4	5	2	1

=== New Zealand ===
The New Zealand Police do not usually carry firearms. Under normal circumstances, police in New Zealand carry pepper spray, batons, and Tasers, though all are trained with the Glock 17 pistol and Bushmaster M4 semi-automatic rifle. These firearms are carried in all frontline police vehicles and are available for use should a situation require it. There are times when due to a credible threat, New Zealand's 12 district police commanders have the authority to arm all of their frontline officers. After the 2019 Christchurch mosque shootings all frontline police officers throughout the country were instructed by the Police Commissioner to carry guns while on duty until the National Threat Level was eventually lowered from high.

Although most staff do not regularly carry firearms, some units such as the Dignitary Protection Service and Airport Police do permanently carry firearms.

When force is used (excluding handcuffs) a tactical operations report is filed. Use of tactical options is published by the New Zealand Police. A summary of tactical options used in 2010–2014 was published in 2015. In 33,198 events over the four-year period, firearms were drawn 1,422 times, resulting in 5 injuries.

In 2020, seven firearm discharges occurred in five incidents, three resulted in fatal injuries, one in non-fatal injuries, and one missed the subject. From 1990 to 2022, the New Zealand Police have killed 39 people in shooting events.

=== Norway ===
Since July 1, 2025, The Norwegian Police Service (NPS) always carry firearms. The use of firearms is recorded by the police station which publishes detailed statistics on the annual use of firearms. The information presented in the 2014 report is detailed in the table below.

	2002	2003	2004	2005	2006	2007	2008	2009	2010	2011	2012	2013	2014	2015	2016	2017	2018	2019	2020	2021
Firearm use threatened	70	72	67	52	75	65	55	58	75	66	58	58	42	53	80	125	127	85	107	79
Rounds discharged	1	1	5	3	3	0	2	3	6	1	3	3	2	5	3	4	6	13	11	6
Total	71	73	72	55	78	65	57	61	81	67	61	61	44	58	83	129	133	98	118	85
People killed	0	0	0	1	1	0	0	0	0	0	0	0	0	1	1	0	0	1	2	2
People wounded	1	-	5	1	1	0	1	2	4	1	0	2	0	2	1	2	3	5	3	0
Incidents of armed police	-	-	-	2 666	-	-	2 170	2 358	-	2 711	-	-	2 954			8121	8732	9923	10058	8518

=== Russia ===
Generally, Russian police forces carry firearms and are armed with pistols at a minimum. There is no consistent recording of firearms use across the country. Use of firearms can only be lawful where it is necessary to confront an imminent threat of death or serious injury or a grave and proximate threat to life. Since 2011 the Investigative Committee is responsible for the investigation of alleged unlawful use of police force.

=== South Africa ===
The South African Police Service is monitored by the Independent Police Investigative Directorate (IPID) which releases an annual report on the performance indicators of police activity. The IPID publishes deaths as a results of police action and deaths in police custody. Use of firearms forms the majority of the killings by police; shootings by police are all classified under deaths as a result of police action.

	2012/13	2013/14	2014/15	2015/16	2016/17	2017/18	2018/19
Firearm related incidents of death^{1}	342	317	322	299	-	-	-
Firearm related deaths^{1}	-	336	-	-	-	-	-
Total incidents of death as a result of police action	431	390	396	366	394	436	387
Total deaths as a result of police action	485	409	423	400	467	558	440

1. Includes all categories of deaths as a result of police action with labels "Shot with service firearm", "Shot with police firearm" and "Negligent handling of a firearm leading to death". Excludes suicides.

=== Sweden ===
Officers of the Swedish Police Authority usually carry firearms when on duty. The standard weapon issued to officers is the SIG Sauer P226 but new gun that is under implementation is Glock45. The police authority report that normally police will threaten to use their weapon but do not discharge it; this happens about 200 times per year. In a typical year the police shoot 20 warning shots aimed at people or vehicles. An investigation reviewing the use of weapons by police details the firearm use from 2003 to 2014.

	2003	2004	2005	2006	2007	2008	2009	2010	2011	2012	2013	2014
Incidents involving shots to wound/kill	11	16	9	8	10	20	11	13	29	17	13	25
Incidents involving warning shots	9	15	9	3	12	16	11	8	32	14	16	14

Only the most serious use of violence is counted, if an incident involves both warning shots and shots for effect it is only counted in the shots for effect section.

=== United Kingdom ===
Police forces in the United Kingdom are managed by different bodies but their use of firearms is governed by the UK Home Office. Many police in Northern Ireland carry firearms whereas the police in Great Britain generally do not.

==== England and Wales ====
The police in England and Wales do not routinely carry firearms. A 2006 poll of 47,328 members of the Police Federation of England and Wales found that 82% do not want officers to be routinely armed while on duty. The UK Home Office reports annual statistics on the use of firearms by police forces. The use of firearms is recorded by the police department which publishes detailed statistics on the annual use of firearms dating back to 2003. One report published figures for 2003–2013; later years are published individually. While the Home Office monitors the use of police equipment, the Independent Police Complaints Commission monitored the fatalities of people due to police contact up to 2016.

	2003/4	2004/5	2005/6	2006/7	2007/8	2008/9	2009/10	2010/11	2011/12	2012/13	2013/14	2014/15	2015/16
Operations involving armed police^{1}	16,657	15,981	18,891	18,005	19,595	16,456	14,218	13,496	12,550	10,996	14,939	14,685	14,753
Operations involving armed response vehicles^{1}	13,218	13,137	14,355	14,527	14,972	19,928	17,068	16,774	14,261	13,116	12,135	12,287	12,471
Authorised firearms officers^{1}	6,096	6,243	6,584	6,728	6,780	6,906	6,979	6,653	6,756	6,091	5,864	5,647	5,639
Incidents where firearms were discharged^{1}	4	5	9	3	7	5	6	4	5	3	4	6	7
Incidents of fatalities^{2}	-	3	5	1	4	3	2	2	2	0	0	1	3

1. Data provided by the UK Home Office.
2. Data provided by the Independent Police Complaints Commission

In 2017 the Independent Police Complaints Commission was replaced with the Independent Office for Police Conduct (IOPC). The IOPC publishes the use of firearms in a different format. Reported figures on fatal shootings by police are tabled below.

	2016/17	2017/18	2018/19
Operations involving armed police^{1}	15,783	18,781	20,186
Operations involving armed response vehicles^{1}	13,188	15,838	17,742
Authorised firearms officers^{1}	6,278	6,459	6,653
Incidents where firearms were discharged^{1}	6	8	13
Fatal shootings by police^{2}	6	2	3

1. Data provided by the UK Home Office.
2. Data provided by the Independent Office for Police Conduct

==== Northern Ireland ====
The Police Service of Northern Ireland publish an annual report on the police use of force which lists the frequency that firearms were drawn and fired. However, this report does not list the injuries or deaths resulting from firearms use.

	2010/11	2011/12	2012/13	2013/14	2014/15	2015/16	2016/17	2017/18	2018/19
Firearm drawn or pointed	302	360	364	419	265	358	431	499	520
Firearm discharged	3	0	1	0	0	1	1	1	0

Data published by the Police Service of Northern Ireland.

==== Scotland ====
The Police Investigation & Review Commissioner publishes an annual report on assessments of complaints and investigations carried out.

	2015/16	2016/17	2017/18	2018/19
Assessments of police firearms incidents^{1}	21	41	46	66
Investigations of serious injuries following police contact^{2}	3	5	8	13
Investigations of deaths following police contact^{2}	12	19	4	11

1. Conventional firearms only.
2. Deaths and injuries arising from firearms and other police contact.

Data published by the Police Investigation & Review Commissioner.

=== United States ===
Generally, all law enforcement officers in the United States carry firearms and are armed with pistols at a minimum. There is no consistent recording of firearms use across all states; some bodies, such as the New York Police Department (NYPD), report on firearms discharge. In 2015 NYPD reported a record low of eight deaths as well as fifteen injuries caused by police firearms discharge.

The Federal Bureau of Investigation publish the number of "justified" homicides by law enforcement.

In response to the lack of published data, the organization Campaign Zero launched Mapping Police Violence to collect comprehensive data on people killed by police in the United States. Similarly, the British newspaper The Guardian launched "The Counted" – a program to record the number of fatal police shootings throughout the United States. The Guardian reports that 1,146 people were killed in 2015 and 1,093 people in 2016.

	2010	2011	2012	2013	2014	2015	2016	2017	2018
Justifiable homicide^{1}	396	401	423	467	450	452	439	443	410
Number of deaths^{2}	-	-	-	-	-	1,146	1,093	-	-
Number of deaths^{3}	-	-	-	-	-	995	963	987	998
Number of deaths^{4}	-	-	-	1,079	1,131	1,187	1,129	1,146	1,165

1. Justifiable homicides recorded by the FBI
2. Mapping Police Violence. Unofficial figures based on media reports
3. The Counted. Unofficial figures based on media reports
4. Fatal Force. Unofficial figures based on media reports

== See also ==
- List of countries with annual rates and counts for killings by law enforcement officers
