= Lambeth CPCG =

Lambeth Community Police Consultative Group is a community policing group for the London Borough of Lambeth. It provides a forum for consultation between the police and community in Lambeth. As well as monthly public meetings it provides community observers to specific police operations, to police training programmes and to day to day policing activity.

It was the first Community Police Consultative Group to follow from the Scarman report into the Brixton riot (1981), being established in 1982 with the participation of the then home secretary, Willie Whitelaw.
