= Community policing =

Strategy of public safety administration

Community policing is a philosophy and organizational strategy whereby law enforcement cooperates with community groups and citizens in producing safety and security. The theory underlying community policing is that it makes citizens more likely to cooperate with police by changing public perceptions of both the intention and capacity of the police. The theory is also that it changes attitudes of police officers and increases accountability.

Scholarship has raised questions about whether community policing leads to improved outcomes.

== History ==
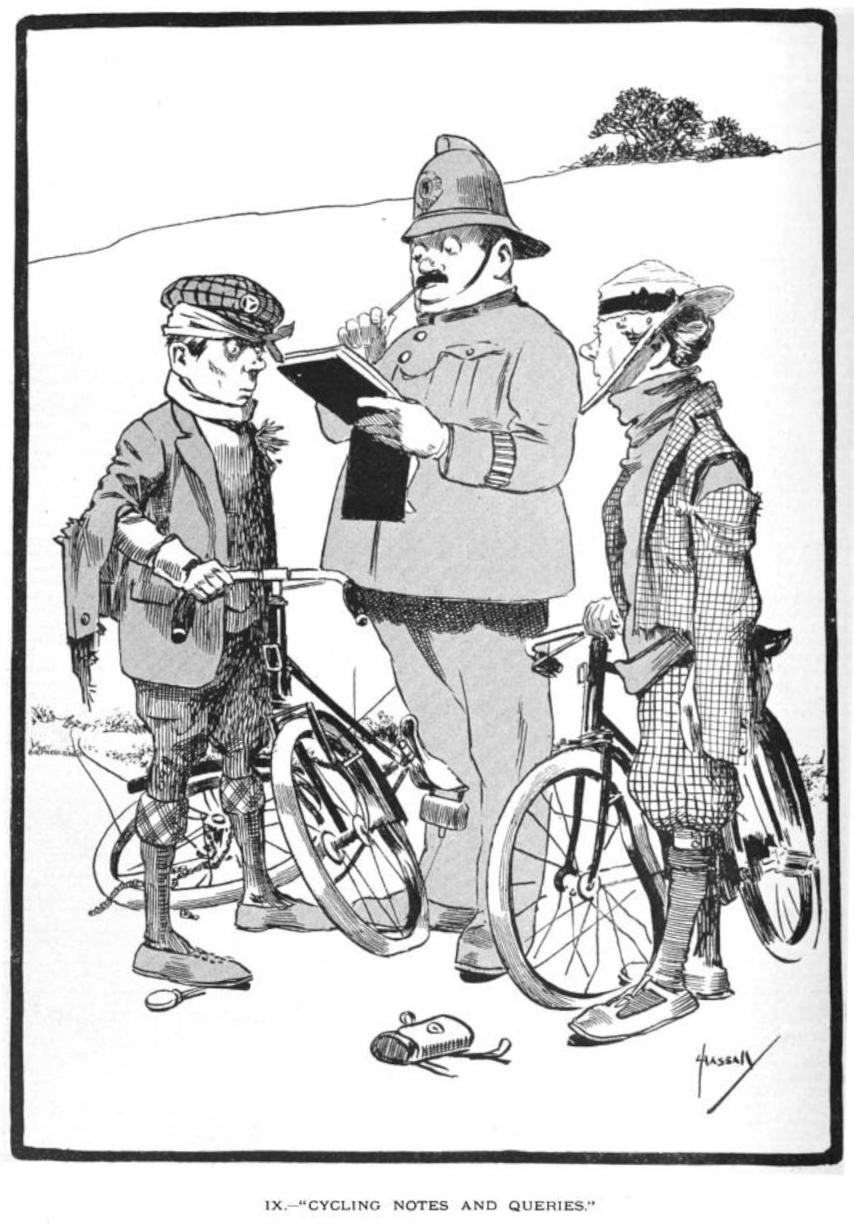

Values of community policing have been linked to Sir Robert Peel's 1829 Peelian Principles, most notably John Alderson, the former Chief Constable of Devon and Cornwall Police. Peel's ideas included that the police needed to seek the cooperation of the public and prioritize crime prevention. The term "community policing" came into use in the late 20th century, and then only as a response to a preceding philosophy of police organization.

In the early 20th century, the rise of automobiles, telecommunications and suburbanization impacted how the police operated. Researchers noted that police moved towards reactive strategies rather than proactive, focusing on answering emergency calls quickly and relying on motor vehicle patrols to deter crime. Some police forces such as the Chicago Police Department began rotating officers between different neighborhoods as a measure to prevent corruption and, as a result, foot patrols became rare. This changed the nature of police presence in many neighborhoods.

By the 1960s, many countries, including the United States, attempted to repair relationships between police forces and black people. In 1967, American President Lyndon B. Johnson appointed a Blue Ribbon committee to study the apparent distrust of the police by many community members, especially along racial lines. The resulting report, the President's Commission on Law Enforcement and Administration of Justice suggested developing a new type of police officer who would act as a community liaison and work to build relationships between law enforcement and minority populations. Then-Los Angeles Police Department chief Thomas Reddin would be credited with introducing the concept of community policing. The Kansas City preventive patrol experiment concluded that motor patrols were not an effective deterrent to crime. Similarly, by 1981, a study by the US-based Police Foundation suggested that police officers spent inadequate time on response duties and in cars that they had become isolated from their communities. In response to some of these problems, many police departments in the United States began experimenting with what would become known as "community policing."

Research by Michigan criminal justice academics and practitioners started being published as early as the 1980s. Bob Trajanowcz, a professor of criminal justice in the late 1990s, influenced many future law enforcement leaders on how to implement elements of community policing One experiment in Flint, Michigan, involved foot patrol officers being assigned to a specific geographic area to help reduce crime in hot spots. Community-oriented policing was promoted by the Clinton Administration. The 1994 Violent Crime Control and Law Enforcement Act established the Office of Community Oriented Policing Services (COPS) within the Justice Department and provided funding to promote community policing.

Belgium in the late-20th century encouraged proximity policing.

Kenneth Peak has argued that community policing in the United States has evolved through three generations: innovation (1979 to 1986), diffusion (1987 to 1994), and institutionalization (1995 to the present day). He says the innovation period occurred following the civil unrest of the 1960s, in large part as an attempt to identify alternatives to the reactive methods developed in mid-century. This era also saw the development of such programs like the broken windows theory and problem-oriented policing. Peak says the diffusion era followed, in which larger departments began to integrate aspects of community policing, often through grants that initiated specialized units. Lastly, the institutionalization era introduced the mass application of community-policing programs, in not only large departments but also smaller and more rural ones.

== Method ==
Many community-oriented police structures focus on assigning officers to a specific area called a "beat", during this officers become familiar with that area through a process of "beat profiling". The officers are then taught how to design specific patrol strategies to deal with the types of crime that are experienced in that beat.

These ideas are implemented in a multi-pronged approach using a variety of aspects, such as broadening the duties of the police officer and individualizing the practices to the community they're policing; refocusing police efforts to face-to-face interactions in smaller patrol areas with an emphasized goal of preventing criminal activity instead of responding to it; solving problems using input from the community they're policing; and, finally, making an effort to increase service-oriented positive interactions with police.

Common methods of community-policing include:

- Encouraging the community to help prevent crime by providing advice, talking to students, and encouraging neighborhood watch groups.
- Increased use of foot or bicycle patrols.
- Increased officer accountability to the communities they serve.
- Creating teams of officers to carry out community policing in designated neighborhoods.
- Clear communication between the police and the communities about their objectives and strategies.
- Partnerships with other organizations such as government agencies, community members, nonprofit service providers, private businesses, and the media.
- Moving toward some decentralizing of the police authority, allowing more discretion among lower-ranking officers, and more initiative expected from them.
- Collaborating with social services to connect individuals to social workers, mental health resources, youth programs, and other supports to address underlying issues like poverty, inadequate housing, and lack of youth opportunities

== Social media ==
Some positives that social media brings to law enforcement would include increasing trust in law enforcement, educating the public of safety issues, decreasing crime, identifying the root cause of neighborhood crime, and framing the "good cop" frame. When talking about increasing trust in law enforcement, social media is regarded as improving agencies' capacities to engage with the community positively. Active social media use can humanize officers and eventually increase trust between the police and the community. Educating the public-on-public safety issues, departments with a stake in community outreach can utilize social media to disseminate details on suspects, crime prevention efforts, or other public safety concerns. Recent studies have found that social media is useful for both analyzing past crime and predicting those that will occur in the future, which is conductive to intelligence-driven and predictive police models. According to "good cop" frame or theory, police personnel are honorable, obedient, well-trained, and genuinely committed to preventing crime and safeguarding the public from harm.

Some negatives that social media brings to law enforcement would include the "bad cop" frame and rapid spreading. The "bad cop" frame or theory is where police officers are portrayed as ineffective, a little crooked, and most frequently incompetent within the evil cop frame. In contrast to reality, police personnel are portrayed in police shows as being more violent and aggressive. There are times when the media's misrepresentation of police and their work has blatantly detrimental effects on police. Rapid spreading happens when negative results of a situation are published online, it might be very difficult to remove them because, as the phrase goes, "Once on the Internet, always on the Internet."

Electronic Community-Oriented Policing (E-COP) or e-Community Policing is a methodical approach to police that integrates mass communication, individual behavior, and social behavior theories into everyday policing activities. It employs push, pull, and networking tactics to carry out community-focused policing online without making reference to particular geographic places. Social networking platforms, for example, have provided police departments of all sizes a great opportunity to engage with the people they protect and serve without using the traditional mainstream media. In this sense, having the police perform E-COP and verify authentic trustworthy information sources is a smart approach to assist citizens in defending themselves and aid the police to safeguard their reputation by communicating with the public in a true and official manner. Some strategies that E-COP use include digital technologies, crime mapping, Geographic Information System (GIS), fingerprints, DNA analysis, Integrated Automated Fingerprint Identification System (IAFIS), Combined DNA Index System (CODIS), hotspot policing, cameras, smartphones, body worn cameras, dash-mounted cameras, etc. When thinking about why departments should integrate E-COP into their departments, we remember that a key element of community policing is improved communication between the police and the public. A service like E-COP provides a novel opportunity for the department to inform the public while simultaneously giving residents a new way to engage with the department.

A new topic regarding social media is mass media and the mass media act. Mass media is evolving into ever-new forms and platforms. The best thing the police can do to keep and even increase public trust in them is to construct their own public image with tact and consideration for both professional standards and existing public expectations. The legitimacy of police can be strongly impacted by image management efforts, and the police frequently utilize image management to uphold and improve their validity. The mass media act regards the public's perception of facts about criminal attitudes is somewhat tainted by the mass media itself. It informs the public about crimes being perpetrated and the necessity for vigilance and self-protection, the mass media may, on the one hand encourage crime prevention. On the other side, the media may unnecessarily heighten public dread of crimes by fostering a moral panic, which is to say, by inciting a response among the populace based on incorrect perceptions of crime hazards resulting from media themes rather than real incidences of violent crimes.

== Evaluation ==
Traditionally, determining whether police or policies are effective or not can be done by evaluating the crime rate for a geographic area. A crime rate in the United States is determined using the FBI's Uniform Crime Reports (UCR) or National Incident-Based Reporting System (NIBRS), as well as the Bureau of Justice Statistics' National Crime Victimization Survey (NCVS). Community policing can be evaluated by comparing crime rates and by comparing additional criteria. One criterion to determine whether or not community policing is effective in an area is for officers and key members of the community to set a specific mission and goals when starting. Once specific goals are set, participation at every level is essential in obtaining commitment and achieving goals. Another approach in evaluation of community policing is social equity.

The U.S. federal government continues to provide support for incorporating community policing into local law enforcement practices through funding of research such as through the National Center for Community Policing at Michigan State University, small COPS grants to local agencies, and technical assistance.

=== Randomized controlled trials ===
A review of randomized controlled trials claims little evidence on effectivity of community meetings, tiplines, or reduction of police abuse. This study found that community policing in the Global South might not increase trust in police or reduce crime.

A randomized controlled trial on the effect of community policing on individual attitudes towards the police found that positive contact with police—delivered via brief door-to-door non-enforcement community policing visits—substantially improved residents' attitudes toward police, including legitimacy and willingness to cooperate. These effects remained large in a 21 day follow-up and were largest among nonwhite respondents. Specifically, the initial effect among Black residents was almost twice as large as the effect among White residents.

== Criticisms ==
Criminologists have raised several concerns vis-a-vis community policing and its implementation. Many legal scholars have highlighted that the term "community", at the heart of "community policing", is in itself ambiguous. Without a universal definition of the term, it is difficult to define what "community policing" should look like.

Others have remained skeptical of the political ambition behind community policing initiatives. For example, in 1984, Peter Waddington cautioned that the "largely uncritical acceptance with which [the notion of community policing] has been welcomed is itself a danger. Any proposal, however attractive, should be subjected to careful and skeptical scrutiny." In particular, Waddington voiced concern that community policing was merely a restoration of the "bobby on the beat" concept, which had nostalgic appeal because it was less impersonal than the officer "flashing past" in a police car. He said that the former was a "romantic delusion", because "there was never a time when the police officer was everyone's friend, and there will never be such a time in the future." He also believed that order could only be maintained by the community itself, and not by the police alone.

Similarly, C. B. Klockars and David Bayley both argue that community policing is unlikely to bring fundamental change to how police officers work, with Klockars calling it "mainly a rhetorical device". Unlike Klockars, Steven Herbert believes that community policing is proposing a fundamental change to policing, but says that it would be a difficult one to achieve. He says the progressive and democratic ethos of shared governance inherent in community policing runs counter to central elements in police culture and more widespread understandings of crime and punishment. Charles P. McDowell proposed in 1993 that because community policing was a radical departure from existing ideology, implementing it would take time.

In a 2025 case study of police co-response teams in Montréal, Orlando Nicoletti and colleagues describe them as a form of community policing that can function as a public relations response, presenting reform while leaving core police practices largely intact. They also argue that these programs can help build public consent for expanded police surveillance and coercive intervention. The authors further characterize the approach as akin to domestic counter-insurgency, in that it can weaken or contain organized political resistance to police power.

Other criticisms revolve around the potential efficacy of community policing. David Bayley has argued that enacting community policing policies may lead to a reduction in crime control effectiveness, maintenance of order in the face of violence, increase in bureaucratic and governmental power over community affairs, increases in unequal treatment, and an erosion of constitutional rights. According to Stenson, there is a dilemma within community policing: when practicing community policing, police officers have the tendency of getting too involved with trying to institute "particularistic community normative standards". He says this could in turn be problematic, in that it could entice corruption or vigilantism.

== See also ==
- Copaganda
- Evidence-based policing
- Lambeth CPCG
- Peelian principles
- Predictive policing
- Preventive police
- Proactive policing
- Stop-and-frisk in New York City
- Tommy Norman
- Kōban
