= Preventive police =

Aspect of law enforcement

Preventive police is that aspect of law enforcement intended to act as a deterrent to the commission of crime. Preventive policing is considered a defining characteristic of the modern police, typically associated with Robert Peel's Metropolitan Police, established in 1829. In recent years, however, British police have abandoned the idea of preventive policing in favour of "quick response".

== Historical development in the UK ==
=== Reliance upon executions ===
In the century following 1688, severe punishment was the legal mechanism in England for preventing crime, which included the designations of hundreds of crimes as capital crimes, punishable by death. Public executions were part of the formula, designed to deter criminals by demonstrating the brutal consequences of crime if apprehended.

Reformers argued that this method of prevention was ineffective, advocating instead punishments that, in the mind of the criminal, fit the crime.

Police Magistrate John Fielding, head of the Bow Street Runners, believed that "It is much better to prevent even one man from being a rogue than apprehending and bringing forty to justice." Fielding's Bow Street "thief takers", however, were a stipendiary force, and were primarily relegated to policing crime after it was committed. Despite the introduction of the Bow Street Runners and other paid professionals, private citizens were still overwhelmingly responsible for initiating criminal charges against culprits. Research suggests this reliance on the public to exercise Judicial discretion may have put immigrant groups such as the Irish at a disadvantage.

=== In practice ===
The practical application of the concept in the English policing system is attributed to Patrick Colquhoun, who presented his ideas in A Treatise on the Police of the Metropolis (1797). Colquhoun founded the Thames River Police to counter the significant losses from the theft of cargo being shipped in and out of the Port of London on the River Thames.

In contrast to the Bow Street Runners, the river police acted as a deterrent by their continual presence on the riverfront, in addition to being able to intervene if they spotted a crime in progress. The Thames River Police and the Bow Street Runners were absorbed into the Metropolitan Police in 1839.

=== Utilitarianism calculations ===
Colquhoun was influenced by the utilitarian ideas of his colleague, Jeremy Bentham, who helped make the case for the establishment of the river police. On the subject of policing, Bentham promoted the views of Italian Marquis Cesare Beccaria, and disseminated a translated version of "Essay on Crime in Punishment".

Beccaria placed preventive policing in terms consistent with Bentham's own beliefs, espousing the guiding principle of "the greatest good for the greatest number", which Bentham used as the foundation of his utilitarian philosophy:

It is better to prevent crimes than to punish them. This is the chief aim of every good system of legislation, which is the art of leading men to the greatest possible happiness or to the least possible misery, according to calculation of all the goods and evils of life.

An 1829 London Review article entitled, "Preventive police" caught the attention of Jeremy Bentham, and began his mentoring relationship with its author, Edwin Chadwick, that would last until Bentham's death in 1832. Chadwick's article contributed to the debate leading up to Robert Peel's proposal for a metropolitan police force.

He argued that prevention ought to be the primary concern of a police body, which was not the case in practice. The reason, argued Chadwick, was that "A preventive police would act more immediately by placing difficulties in obtaining the objects of temptation." In contrast to a deterrent of punishment, a preventive police force would deter criminality by making crime cost-ineffective, anticipating the "crime doesn't pay" motto promoted by American police reformers in the 20th century.

Not only would a preventive police trump punishment as a deterrent, it would also reduce the costs of a criminal justice system over-burdened by prosecuting crimes that have already been committed.

In the second draft of his 1829 Police Act, the "object" of the new Metropolitan Police, was changed by Robert Peel to the "principal object", which was the "prevention of crime". Later historians would attribute the perception of England's "appearance of orderliness and love of public order" to the preventive principle entrenched in Peel's police system.

== Critical views ==
More recent histories have considered the preventive principle in a more critical light, attempting to reconcile its introduction with the broader social changes that were underway in late eighteenth century Britain. An obvious problem with the celebratory tone such as the quote above is that Patrick Colquhoun, although he claimed policing was a "new science" and embraced a utilitarian approach to social problems, was not making an original contribution to English order, as he saw it, based purely on scientific insights and British values of liberty.

Instead, he looked to France, where, in his view, they had achieved "the greatest degree of perfection" with their police. Others have noted that preventive police were sprouting up in Glasgow, where he lived before moving to London, calling into question the significance of his river police as a unique policing innovation.

The significance of preventive policing in eighteenth century metropolitan London is that Colquhoun and the other utilitarians were looking not just at the problem of crime, but to the larger problem posed by the poverty of the working class and in securing private property. What Colquhoun was looking to prevent was poor workers falling into the criminal sub-class.

His river police were targeting not just the handful of river pirates and "mudlarks", but workers on the docks who treated payment "in kind" as part of their over-all wage that sustained them and their families. Colquhoun estimated that one-third of dock workers were stealing, which is what he sought to prevent.

By preventing these workers from stealing, they would become fully dependent on money wages, and be disciplined by the wage system; one of the jobs performed by Colquhoun's police was to set wage-rates of dock workers. Preventive policing, from this perspective, is therefore significant for its role in developing the class system in industrializing England, as part of the broader movement that included the enclosures and poor law to England.

== See also ==
- Community policing
- Peelian principles
- Proactive policing
- Social alienation
