= Polizeiwissenschaft =

Polizeiwissenschaft (German pronunciation: [poliˈtsaɪˌvɪsn̩ʃaft], literally "Police science", though "Polizei" may in this case be better translated as "Public Policy" or "Politics" in a broad sense) was a discipline born in the first third of the 18th century which lasted until the middle of the 19th century.

Considered as the science of the internal order of the community, it was a comprehensive term, which included today's public law, administrative science, the early political economy, public health concerns, urbanism and urban planning (important in the light of the miasma theory of disease), etc. It overlapped with the simultaneously used term of Verwaltungswissenschaft (or "administrative science") and was a university course included in official trainings.

The first instruction chairs for "Cameralia Oeconomica and Polizeiwissenschaft" were created in 1727 by Frederick William I of Prussia in Halle, Saxony-Anhalt and Frankfurt. One of the Polizeiwissenschaft first practitioners was Johann Friedrich von Pfeiffer born in Berlin and was a leading exponent of the theory on economic sustainability. Polizeiwissenschaft was quite distinct from today's use of the term "police", which is strictly reserved for law enforcement activities. It included "Marktpolizei" ("market police"), concerned with the surveillance of prices and economical activity, "Gewerbeaufsicht" ("surveillance of trade"), "Bauaufsicht" ("construction supervision") and "Ausländerpolizei" ("Foreigners' police").

The term has recently been used in a sense more closely related to contemporary police activities, used both as a comprehensive term as a synonym of "police sciences" (including jurisprudence, criminology, sociology, psychology, political science, forensics, etc.).

== Bibliography ==
- Michel Foucault, Security, Territory, population (1977-78 course, published 2004)
- Wolfgang Wüst, Die „gute“ Policey im Reichskreis. Zur frühmodernen Normensetzung in den Kernregionen des Alten Reiches,
  - Bd. 1: Der Schwäbische Reichskreis, unter besonderer Berücksichtigung Bayerisch-Schwabens, Berlin 2001,
  - Bd. 2: Der Fränkische Reichskreis, Berlin 2003,
  - Bd. 3: Der Bayerische Reichskreis und die Oberpfalz, Berlin 2004.
