= George Fraser Black =

American historian

- Born: March 10, 1865; Stirling, Scotland
- Died: September 7, 1948 (aged 82–83); Lyndhurst, New Jersey, U.S.
- Occupations: Librarian, historian, linguist
- Employer: New York Public Library

George Fraser Black (March 10, 1865 – September 7, 1948) was a Scottish-born American librarian, historian and linguist. He worked at the New York Public Library for more than three decades, and he was the author of several books about Scottish culture and anthroponymy, Romani people and witchcraft.

== Early life ==
George Fraser Black was born in 1865 in Stirling, Scotland. He earned a PhD before emigrating to the United States. He was married to Annette Campbell McColl Black. They had three children.

== Career ==
Black became a librarian, historian and linguist. He worked at the New York Public Library from 1896 to 1931. He authored several books about Scotland, especially its folklore, witchcraft and surnames, as well as gypsies. In Scotland's Mark on America, Black writes about the contributions made by Americans of Scottish descent, including many presidents.

Black collected books about witchcraft, some of which were later acquired by Fairleigh Dickinson University, followed by Drew University. Among them is a copy of Malleus Maleficarum, co-authored by Heinrich Kramer and Jacob Sprenger.

== Death ==
Black died on September 7, 1948, in Lyndhurst, New Jersey, where he resided.

== Selected works ==
- Black, George Fraser (1894). Scottish Charms and Amulets. Edinburgh, Scotland: Neill and Co. OCLC 3149242.
- Black, George Fraser (1903). Thomas, Northcote W. (ed.). Examples of Printed Folk-lore Concerning the Orkney & Shetland Islands. London, U.K.: The Folklore Society. OCLC 4894963.
- Black, George Fraser (1914). A Gypsy Bibliography. London, U.K.: Bernard Quaritch. OCLC 1026364.
- Sinclair, Albert Thomas (1915). Black, George Fraser (ed.). An American-Romani Vocabulary. New York City: New York Public Library. OCLC 670364327.
- Black, George Fraser (1916). A List of Works Relating to Scotland. New York City: New York Public Library. OCLC 681892745.
- Black, George Fraser (1916). Romani and Dard. New York City: New York Public Library. OCLC 4582505.
- Black, George Fraser (1921). Scotland's Mark on America. New York City: The Scottish section of "America's Making". OCLC 671920925.
- Black, George Fraser (1926). Macpherson's Ossian and the Ossianic Controversy: A Contribution Towards a Bibliography. New York City: New York Public Library. OCLC 4582473.
- Black, George Fraser (1938). A Calendar of Cases of Witchcraft in Scotland, 1510-1727. New York City: New York Public Library. OCLC 2232591.
- Black, George Fraser (1946). The Surnames of Scotland: Their Origin, Meaning, and History. New York City: New York Public Library. ISBN 9780871041722. OCLC 1303608.
