= Latson =

Latson is a surname. Notable people with the surname include:

- Reginald Latson, also known as Neli Latson, autistic American man who was arrested in 2010 and later pardoned
- T. L. Latson (born 1970s), American basketball player
- Ta'Niya Latson (born c. 2004), American basketball player
- W. R. C. Latson (1866–1911), American physician
