= COVID-19 pandemic in Utah =

- Disease: COVID-19
- Pathogen: SARS-CoV-2
- Location: Utah
- First outbreak: Grand Princess
- Index case: Salt Lake City
- Arrival date: March 6, 2020 (6 years, 8 months, 1 week and 5 days)
- Confirmed cases: 1,113,881 (through November 1, 2023)
- Hospitalized cases: 44,324 (cumulative)
- Critical cases: 5,678 (cumulative)
- Ventilator cases: 1,859 (cumulative)
- Deaths: 5,455

Government website
- coronavirus.utah.gov

The COVID-19 pandemic in Utah was part of the worldwide pandemic of coronavirus disease 2019 (COVID-19) The first case of COVID-19 in Utah was reported on March 6, 2020. The patient was believed to have been exposed while aboard the Grand Princess cruise ship. Residents stockpiled goods, large conferences were made remote-only, postponed, or cancelled; a state of emergency was declared, and some public universities and other colleges switched to online-only classes. After the first case of community spread was found on March 14, Utah faced a shortage of testing kits, and public schools were ordered to be closed. Community spread was confirmed in more counties, and the state issued a public health order prohibiting dine-in service in restaurants and gatherings of more than 10 people except in grocery stores. A 5.7-magnitude earthquake struck the Wasatch Front on March 18, 2020, hampering the pandemic response.

In late March 2020, Salt Lake, Davis, Weber, Morgan, Tooele, Summit, and Wasatch counties directed people to stay at home except for essential activities. In April 2020, the state briefly ordered all adults entering the state to fill out an online travel declaration. It established phased guidelines for the public to follow and moved from the "red" phase to the "orange" phase at the start of May, advising people to leave home infrequently, staying six feet away from others and wearing face masks when in public.

In May 2020, the "yellow" guidelines went into effect in most of the state, advising people to continue to stay six feet away from others when outside the home and to wear face coverings when social distancing was difficult to maintain. Cases sharply spiked in June, driven by outbreaks in work sites. About 1% of the population across four counties had antibodies. Independence Day fireworks were cancelled or modified in several cities. Cases continued to increase through July 2020 but fell by the next month and continued downward as schools began to open under a statewide mask requirement. Schools began having multiple outbreaks going into September 2020 as cases in the state began to trend upward overall.

Local food trucks coordinated by the Food Truck League also delivered meals to health-care workers at hospitals across Utah during the pandemic.

== Timeline ==
=== February 2020 ===
On February 27, State Epidemiologist Angela Dunn discouraged the stockpiling of toilet paper, face masks, and food and affirmed the integrity of the public water supply.

On February 29, the first known coronavirus patient to enter Utah was flown into the state to be kept in quarantine. He was a Utah resident and was a passenger on the cruise ship Diamond Princess, though he was not initially considered to be an official case. He was diagnosed in California and was asymptomatic. On March 2, Governor Gary Herbert noted the panic-buying of bottled water and discouraged it.

=== March 2020 ===
On March 2, Herbert appointed Lieutenant Governor Spencer Cox, who was running for governor, to head the state's coronavirus task force.

On March 3, the Qualtrics tech convention was cancelled after the Domopalooza conference had already been cancelled the week before. Domopalooza, with an expected attendance of 3,000, was expected to bring in $2.7 million into the state economy. Qualtrics was expected to have 16,000 attending. Two universities suspended study-abroad programs, with the University of Utah suspending trips to Washington state and Florida.

On March 5, the recently established Utah Coronavirus Task Force criticized a video in which President Donald Trump suggested that coronavirus patients could continue going to work. Lt. Gov. Cox ordered the Task Force to delete its statement the next day.

On March 6, Governor Herbert declared a state of emergency. The Department of Health confirmed that a former passenger on the Grand Princess was the first (presumptive) case of coronavirus in Utah. Weber County reported a confirmed case on March 10, the second in the state, in a woman who had traveled both domestically and abroad.

On March 8, the University of Utah Hospital set up negative-pressure tents to assess patients for the coronavirus.

On March 11, Utah Jazz player Rudy Gobert became the first NBA player to test positive for the coronavirus, prompting the NBA to suspend its season. Several teams were told to self-quarantine. The Church of Jesus Christ of Latter-Day Saints (LDS Church), which is headquartered in Utah, announced that the April General Conference would be held without a congregation and that the flagship Missionary Training Center (MTC) would switch to videoconferencing.

On March 12, Governor Herbert recommended that all gatherings of more than 100 should be cancelled for the next two weeks. All colleges and universities in the state announced that all classes would be moved online for the remainder of the semester. The LDS Church announced that all gatherings would be cancelled worldwide until further notice. Intermountain Healthcare and University of Utah Health announced that they will launch six drive-through testing locations. On March 13, a shortage of hand sanitizer prompted the state to ration bottles of Everclear grain alcohol.

On March 13, Governor Herbert announced that all school districts in the state would enact "soft closure" for two weeks beginning Monday, March 16.

On March 14, the first Utah case of community transmission, also known as community spread, was confirmed in Summit County.

On March 15, there was a shortage of diagnostic tests, with the state lab able to test 41 patients per day. Several ski resorts closed in addition to the ones already closed. Summit County ordered a 30-day shutdown of public businesses and churches except grocery stores. Salt Lake County closed its two convention centers after it already closed Abravanel Hall, the Clark Planetarium, several theaters, senior centers, libraries, rec centers, and golf courses. The county released a statement saying, "Although Salt Lake County is not currently experiencing community transmission, the County is taking precautionary measures to prevent the potential spread of the disease."

On March 16, the remaining passengers of the Grand Princess who were Utah residents were returned to the state to be put in quarantine. Community spread was confirmed in Wasatch County. Salt Lake County ordered all restaurants to stop admitting guests inside except to pick up food for take-out. Restaurants are permitted to take orders online, by telephone, and in drive-thrus. Curbside service is allowed, but staff who take cash or credit card payments must use cleansing measures between each transaction. The Salt Lake City Marathon in April was cancelled. Hogle Zoo and Dinosaur National Monument were closed. The Intermountain Healthcare and University of Utah Health systems announced the postponement of nonemergency surgeries and doctor appointments in preparation of a possible influx of coronavirus patients. Smith's grocery stores reported a surge in demand for essential items. The Utah Food Industry Association released a statement to discourage hoarding. The state government warned that price gouging is illegal during a state of emergency. US Senator Mitt Romney called for every worker to receive $1,000 from the government. A bill to send $1,200 to most Americans was introduced, debated, passed, and signed into law within two weeks.

On March 17, the LDS Church ordered all nonnative missionaries removed from the Philippines. Public businesses were ordered closed in southeastern counties covering Moab where many travelers were expected. Westminster College postponed its commencement ceremonies. The state issued a public health order prohibiting dine-in service in restaurants for two weeks and gatherings of more than 10 individuals, with an exception for grocery stores. Community spread was confirmed in Utah County.

On March 18, a 5.7-magnitude earthquake took down the coronavirus hotline, and a temporary hotline was installed. The earthquake also disrupted COVID-19 testing. The Dominion Energy gas utility stopped disconnections for nonpayment. All public universities and colleges postponed their commencement ceremonies. Community spread was confirmed in Davis County. Ben McAdams, representative for Utah's 4th congressional district, tested positive for COVID-19.

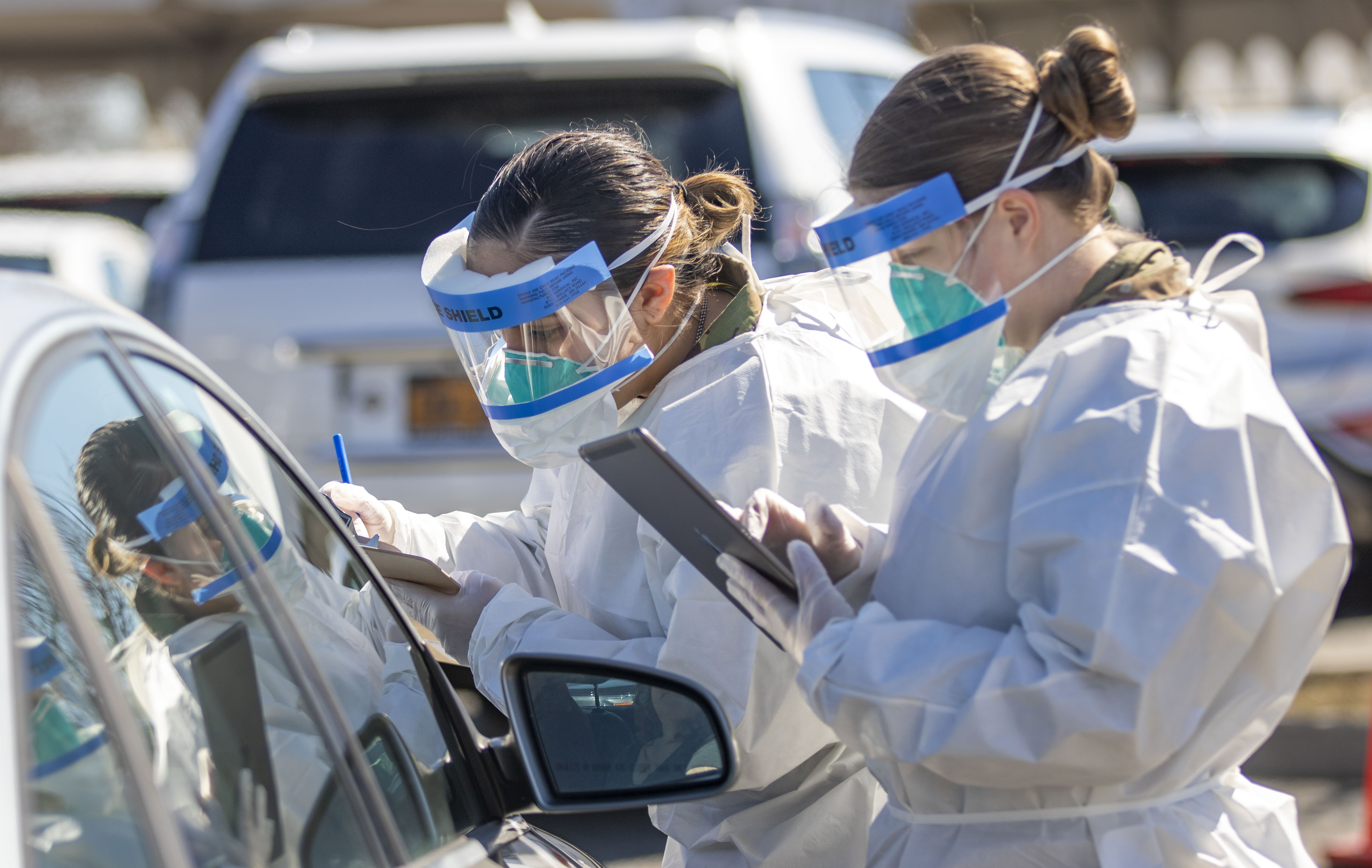
Utah hospitals set up drive-through testing stations.

On March 19, City Creek Center announced that it would close, and Salt Lake County banned gatherings of more than 10 people for 30 days. On March 20, the state announced that it intended to postpone the deadline for filing state taxes. University Health announced that it will offer drive-up assessments; it had already set up drive-up testing stations. On March 22, the first fatality in Utah occurred. The victim was a man in his 60s who had tested positive the previous day and had a history of respiratory difficulties.

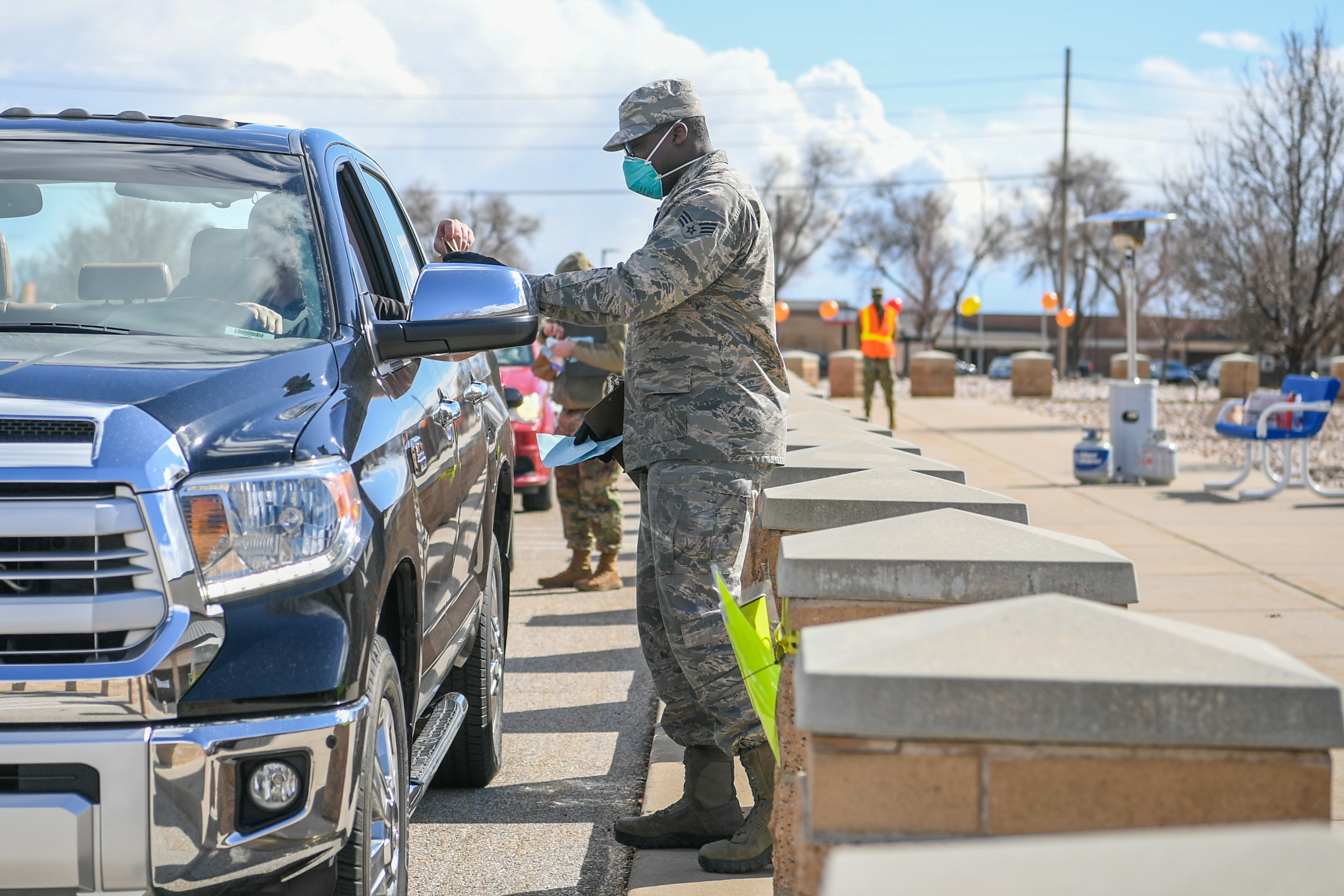
US airman providing curbside service at Hill Air Force Base shopping center during the coronavirus pandemic, March 23, 2020

On March 23, hundreds of people gathered in a large crowd at the Salt Lake City International Airport to welcome 1,600 returning missionaries, prompting criticism from the state government. Testing labs announced that anyone with symptoms would be allowed to be tested. Previously, testing was restricted to those who had contact with known COVID-19 patients or who traveled to areas with widespread infection. On March 24, the state ordered that all elective surgeries and procedures shall be postponed. Governor Herbert unveiled a three-phase, nine-month plan called "Utah Leads Together". The three phases progress from urgent short-term steps, to economic stabilization, and to full economic recovery. Salt Lake City police reported a 30% increase in domestic violence calls. The Department of Environmental Quality warned residents not to flush toilet paper substitutes. State Tax Commissioner John Valentine announced that the Utah Tax Commission would meet on the 26th to extend the deadlines for both payment and filing of state income taxes to July 15 in order to match up with the federal government's extension. Salt Lake County Councilman Arlyn Bradshaw tested positive for the virus after showing symptoms for several days, which he later said was a case of community spread.

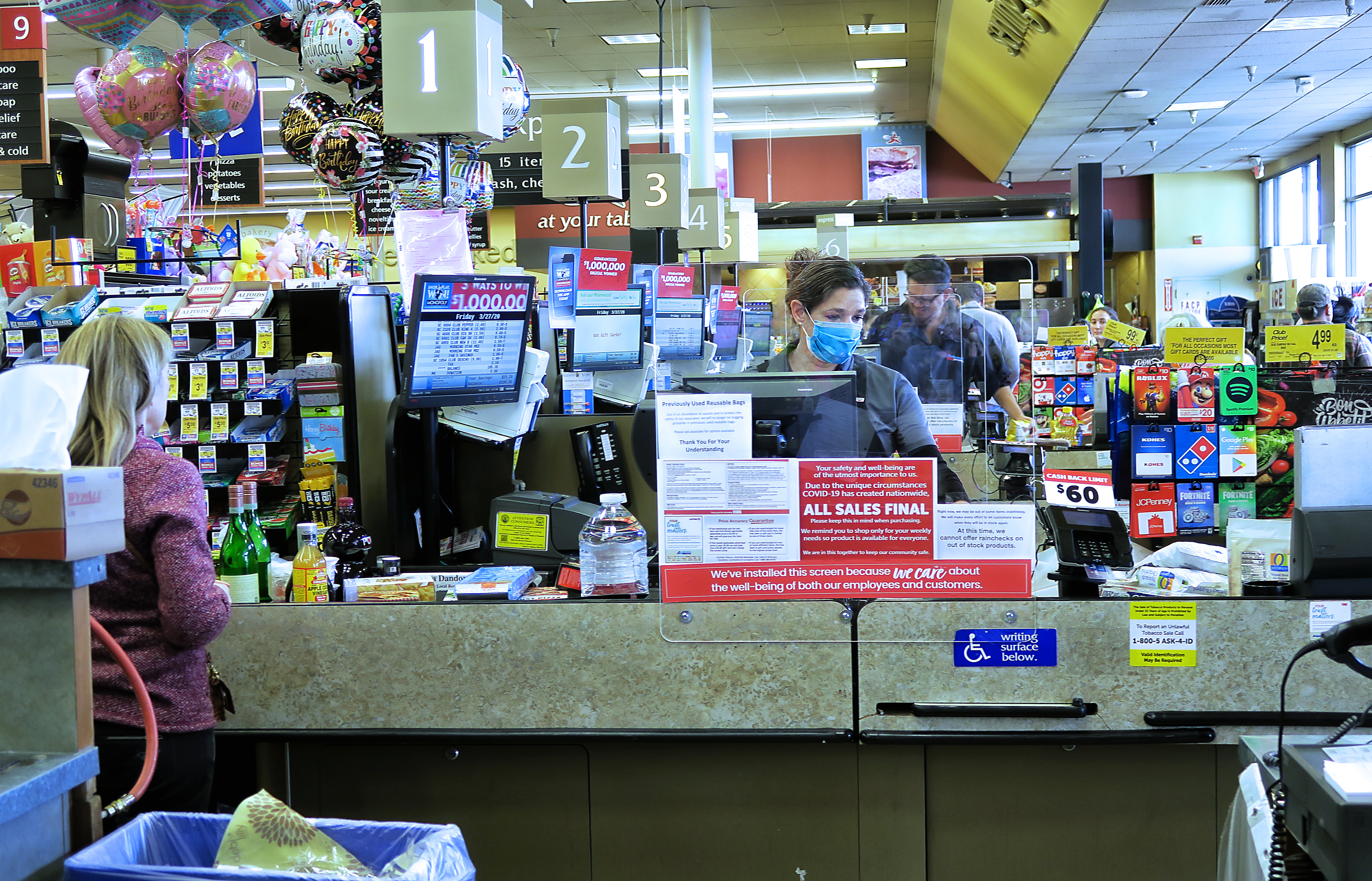
Glass shields such as these were installed to protect employees and customers at grocery store checkout counters.

On March 25, many grocery store chains installed glass shields at checkout counters to protect employees and customers. Navajo Nation President Jonathan Nez issued a stay-at-home order for all residents of Navajo Nation, which overlaps Utah. Summit County issued a stay-at-home order, requiring that "All individuals currently living within Summit County, Utah are ordered to stay at their place of residence" effective March 27 to May 1 inclusive, but "may leave their residences only for 'Essential Activities'..." (defined in the order). Community spread was confirmed in Washington County.

On March 27, Governor Herbert issued a directive for Utahns to voluntarily begin staying at home, and Salt Lake City Mayor Erin Mendenhall signed a proclamation directing all people living in the city to stay at home except for essential travel.

On March 28, Uintah County announced its first case in a man who contracted the virus through community spread after traveling to the Wasatch Front, later reported to be Salt Lake County. Salt Lake County also said that it was tracking more than 70 "presumed positive" cases that are not tallied in the county's official count of 221 cases. The state health department said it doesn't track presumed positive cases because the CDC doesn't have a uniform definition for how to count these cases, and so the criteria varies between health departments.

On March 29, Salt Lake County Mayor Jenny Wilson issued a public health order directing all individuals present within the county to stay safe at home or at their place of residence, except to engage in essential activities and to work to provide essential business, infrastructure, and/or government services. The order superseded a similar order issued by Salt Lake City, and Mayor Mendenhall repealed her order and enacted a proclamation with a less general scope. Former Utah House Speaker Bob Garff dies of the coronavirus. The state health department said that there is no exact and up-to-date count of ICU beds in Utah, and that there were about 600 ventilators in 2018.

On March 30, the University of Washington released a model projecting that Utah hospital ICU beds would soon be overwhelmed and the number of deaths would rise sharply, even assuming the continuation of strong social distancing and other measures. The model is updated from day to day.

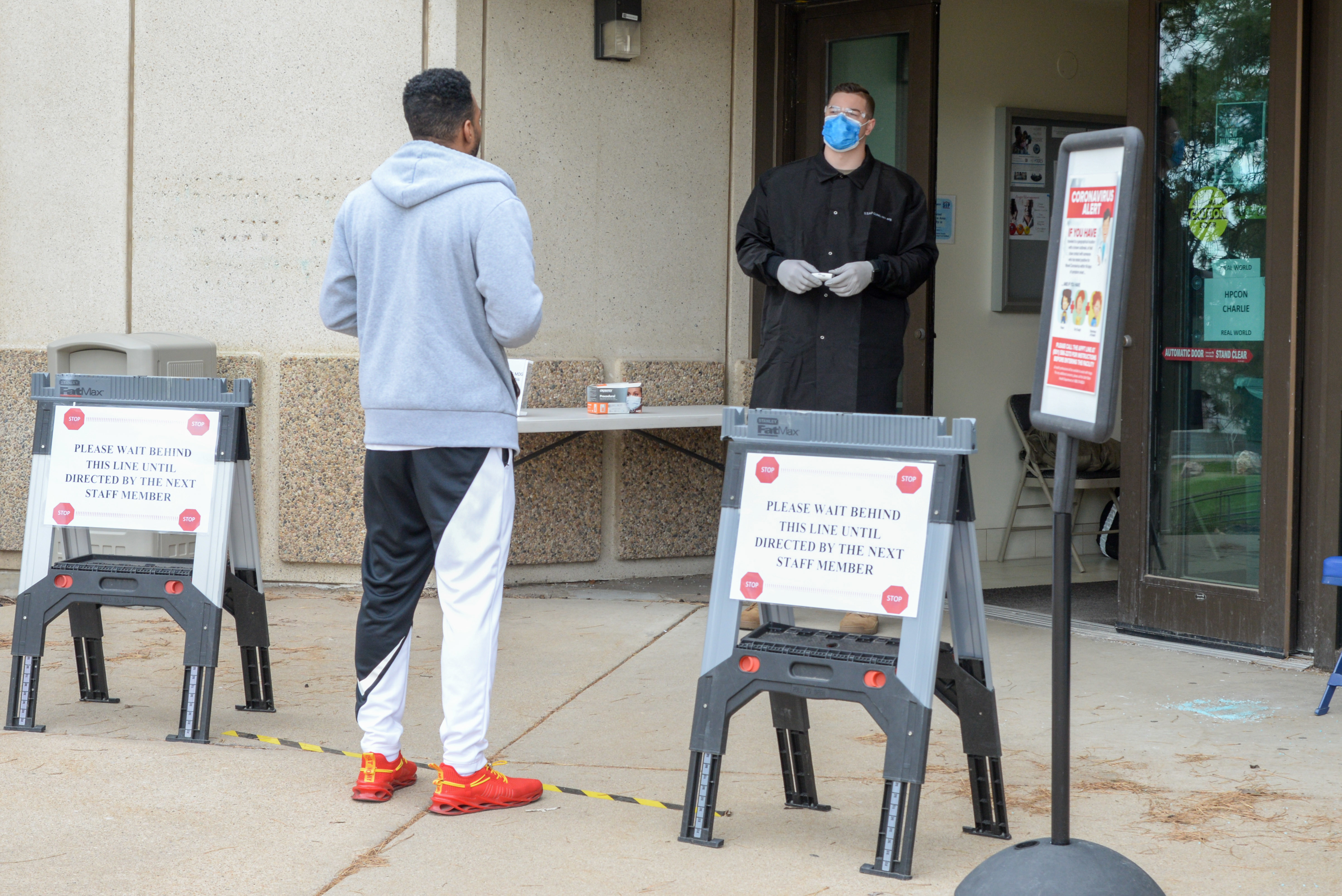
Signs and markings enforce social distancing at a Utah clinic during the coronavirus pandemic, March 31, 2020.

On March 31, Herbert appointed Jefferson Burton, the former head of the Utah National Guard, to head day-to-day operations at the Utah Department of Health, reassigning the executive director, physician Joseph K. Miner, to other duties for personal health reasons.

=== April 2020 ===
On April 1, Governor Herbert issued an executive order suspending enforcement of evictions until May 15 for residential tenants who were current on payments as of March 31 and suffered loss of job or wages.

On April 3, Governor Herbert announced that Zion National Park was closing indefinitely. Visitors were required to leave the park by the end of the day and no new visitors would be permitted to enter.

On April 4, a woman died after contracting COVID-19 at Pine Creek Rehabilitation and Nursing in Salt Lake City, the first to contract the virus in a nursing home. She had tested positive on March 27. At least six patients and two staffers tested positive. On April 5, it was confirmed that the nursing home had the first case of community spread at a Utah nursing home.

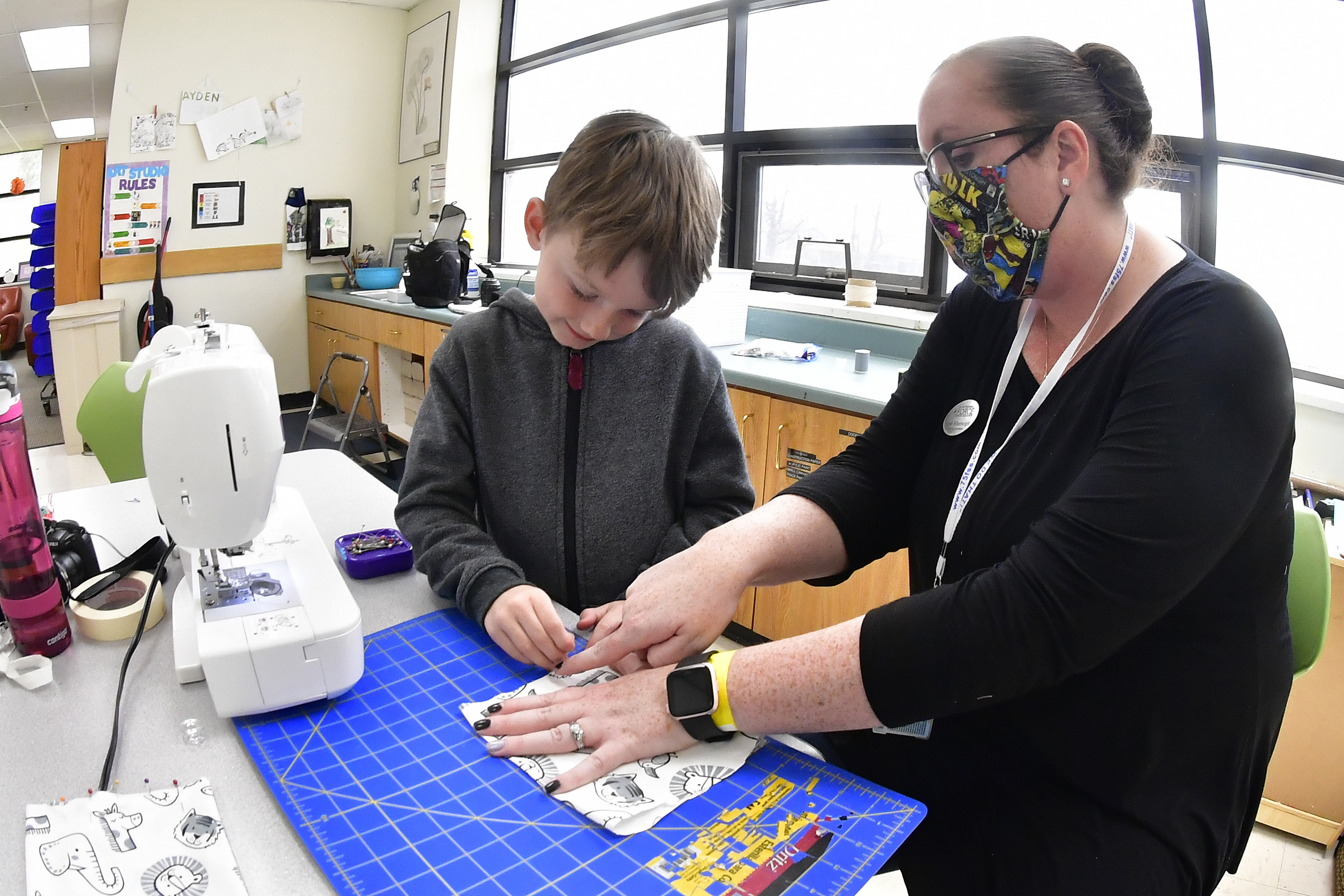
Sewing handmade cloth face masks during the coronavirus pandemic in Utah, April 8, 2020

On April 8, Gov. Herbert said that adults driving into Utah or arriving at Salt Lake International Airport will be ordered to sign a travel declaration within three hours that lists where they have traveled, if they have had symptoms, and if they have been tested. Drivers receive a Wireless Emergency Alert as they drive into Utah directing them to an online form. The order went into effect on April 10, in advance of Easter weekend, and extends to May 1.

April 12, ARUP Laboratories announced that they have begun antibody testing in Utah.

As of April 13, the death toll in Utah stood at 18. After cellphone alerts were sent to the wrong people, Utah switched to using highway signs to inform drivers of the travel declaration. Salt Lake County also sent out a cellphone alert after hearing that a majority of people were not being informed of the stay-at-home order. Harmons grocery stores switched to one-way aisles.

On April 14, the state released COVID-19 statistics on race and ethnicity, revealing that the pandemic is spreading faster among communities of color, especially among Latinos and Pacific Islanders.

On April 17, Governor Herbert announced a color-coded system of guidelines for people to follow, with the state starting at high-risk (red). It is included in version 2 of the Utah Leads Together plan. Salt Lake County issued a health order allowing restaurants to let people inside to order food so long as workers wear face coverings. The order encourages people to wear a mask in places of public accommodation, such as grocery stores, and whenever social distancing is not possible. A man was arrested for terroristic threats and harassment after calling the Salt Lake City mayor's office and saying "the police can't stop me" if Mayor Mendenhall doesn't open up the city. He said a civil war is coming and that Mendenhall will be forcibly removed from office. According to police, he posted on Facebook, "Bring your guns, the civil war starts Saturday [April 18]". On April 18, close to 1,000 people came to the city hall to protest the city's coronavirus restrictions, with one speaker saying that the virus was created in a United States lab. The crowd marched from the city hall to the state capitol.

On April 19, Jefferson Burton, whom Gov. Herbert appointed to head the Utah Department of Health, won a spot in the Republican primary for the state House seat vacated by Rep. Mike McKell, who won nomination for the Senate seat vacated by Sen. Deidre Henderson when she became the running mate of gubernatorial candidate Lt. Gov. Spencer Cox, whom Gov. Herbert appointed to head the state's coronavirus task force.

On April 22, the state announced that it would track residents' movements through a digital contact tracing mobile app called Healthy Together. The governor said the app could assist with contact tracing efforts by using bluetooth and geolocation to track down a users contacts when they are diagnosed with COVID-19. The governor stated that using the app was voluntary and all collected data shared with public health workers would be deleted after 30 days.

On April 23, records surfaced revealing that the state's purchasing division had on March 31 committed to pay $800,000 to Meds in Motion, a pharmacy chain owned by Dan Richards, for an order of 20,000 doses of the malaria drugs hydroxychloroquine and chloroquine. The legislature was considering setting aside a total of $8 million for a drug stockpile, with officials saying that their idea is procure the medicine for 200,000 coronavirus patients and distribute it to drugstores throughout the state. Senate President Stuart Adams participated in talks about buying it from Richards' company. On April 24, Governor Herbert said he has questions about how the purchase came about and that the situation was under legal review. Noting that the order had not yet been delivered, he said "That'd be nice if they just said, you know, we had a miscommunication here and we're apologizing and here's your money back." He also said that the state would not be ordering any more malaria drugs after the Food and Drug Administration (FDA) cautioned against administering the medication for coronavirus to patients outside of a hospital or clinical trial. A review of medical literature, case reports, and data from the American Association of Poison Control Centers showed that some coronavirus patients are experiencing serious heart rhythm problems after taking the malaria drugs.

By April 26, the wearing of face masks had become increasingly common, with 42% of grocery store patrons in the Salt Lake Valley found to be wearing them.

On April 28, the governor's office announced that it was using CARES Act funds, in a public-private partnership, to produce 2 million fabric masks in Utah, offering to mail a free mask to every Utahn who submitted a request.

On April 29, the state announced that it will move from "red" guidelines to "orange" guidelines on May 1.

On April 29, Salt Lake County issued a new health order intended to take effect on May 1 to gradually reopen business with social distancing requirements, largely mirroring Governor Herbert's plan to move to the "Moderate Risk" (orange) guidelines of the Phased Guidelines. Six feet of distance between household groups is the standard guideline. Restaurants will be allowed to reopen dining but not exceed 50% capacity. Hair salons may reopen, but face masks are required for employees. Gyms, movie theaters, and sports venues may reopen with 10 feet of distance between groups. Gatherings of 20 or fewer are allowed.

=== May 2020 ===
On May 3, state Representative Phil Lyman encouraged people to flout public health orders, writing, "If your governor or your local health department orders you to wear [a face mask] you should absolutely not do it, (unless you want to)." He later falsely suggested that the coronavirus pandemic was a conspiracy to unseat President Trump.

On May 4, the Utah Department of Health launched the Docket app, enabling consumer access to the Utah State Immunization information System (USIIS).

On May 5, Intermountain Healthcare announced that it will begin blood tests to check for antibodies for COVID-19 to help add to the state's understanding of where the disease is spreading. They are selecting patients who fit one of three criteria: COVID-19 symptoms for more than 14 days and a negative nasal test, people unprotected during exposures to COVID-19 patients (mostly caregivers), and people who had an undiagnosed illness similar to COVID-19 since December 1. On May 6, University of Utah Health announced that they will do randomized antibody testing, starting with 200 to 250 tests per day for a total sample of 10,000. Both are having ARUP Laboratories process their blood tests.

On May 11, Herbert signed a bill requiring the governor to give 24-hour notice before declaring a state of emergency. The bill was passed in response to Herbert's emergency action to deal with the coronavirus.

On May 14, Governor Herbert announced that most of the state will move from "orange" guidelines to "yellow" guidelines on May 16. The areas remaining in "orange" are the counties of Summit, Wasatch, and Grand and the cities of Salt Lake City and West Valley.

On May 20, Herbert unveiled the third version of the Utah Leads Together plan.

On May 27, the number of cases in the Hispanic community surpassed that of the supermajority white population.

On May 28, new cases jumped by 215. On May 29, the state had a spike of 343 new cases, the largest one-day rise in cases.

=== June 2020 ===
On June 3, state epidemiologist Dunn confirmed a "sharp spike" in cases, the state having seen jumps of over 200 cases seven days in a row. Many of the new cases resulted from outbreaks in places of business. No known cases had yet resulted from the recent protests against police violence.

The weeks-long trend of elevated infections continued to June 16, with Dunn warning that "We are definitely in the acceleration phase." She noted that 78% of new cases were at work sites.

On June 17, Gov. Herbert released the fourth version of his Utah Leads Together plan, focusing on "full-blown economic recovery". Dunn warned that "The risk of exposure to COVID-19 is higher than ever in Utah".

On June 20, Dunn released a statement saying, "For three straight weeks now our cases have been increasing at a rate that isn't sustainable. We are at risk for overwhelming our hospital capacity, which could result in Utahns not getting the medical care they need."

On June 22, the same day that the Utah Department of Health announced 444 new cases of COVID-19, Dunn told Utah State government and health officials in a memo that "we are quickly getting to a point where the only viable option to manage spread and deaths will be a complete shutdown." Dunn urged the Governor to upgrade the condition from 'yellow' and 'green' to 'orange' statewide.

On June 25, Salt Lake City cancelled its July fireworks shows due to the coronavirus. Other cities, such as West Jordan, Ogden, Provo, and Taylorsville, have cancelled or modified similar fireworks shows.

On June 26, researchers from the University of Utah found that about 1% of Utahns had COVID-19 antibodies in May and early June, or more than 3 times the number of confirmed cases at the time. The rate in Summit County was 3.9%.

=== July 2020 ===
On July 1, Jefferson Burton, the acting director of the Utah Department of Health, won the Republican primary for state House district 66 in Utah County with no other parties fielding candidates.

On July 8, the seven-day average of new cases rose to 577 per day.

On July 9, Herbert set a challenge for Utahns to reduce the rolling seven-day average of new cases to below 500 by August 1. At the time, the average was 584 per day. He also ordered all K-12 schools to require masks indoors or on school buses.

On July 10, the seven-day average number of new cases rose past 600 per day, to 622. The Utah Area Presidency of The Church of Jesus Christ of Latter-day Saints called upon its members to wear face masks in public, for "[the] common purpose for the blessing and benefit of all."

On July 15, people crowded into a public meeting in Utah County to push for an exception to statewide mask requirements in schools. The county commissioners were planning to vote on whether to ask the state for a partial exemption, but they abruptly canceled the meeting and postponed the vote because the crowd did not follow social distancing. The next day, Herbert suggested that the crowd was "foolish" and had a "mob mentality".

On July 25, the seven-day average of new cases was 615 per day.

On July 26, 350 new cases were reported in the state, a significant drop over the Pioneer Day state holiday weekend.

On July 30, the state health department released a "COVID-19 School Manual". It mandated face masks for students and staff and makes many recommendations, such as screening for symptoms, cleaning regularly, opening bus windows, opening room windows after someone has been exposed, and closing a classroom or a school after an outbreak. Herbert also announced that the acting director of the state department of health, Jefferson Burton, would leave UDOH and that Richard "Rich" Saunders would become the new acting director.

=== August 2020 ===
On August 1, the seven-day average of new cases was 431, below the target of 500 set by Herbert. On August 11, it fell to 354, below the state's new goal of fewer than 400 new cases per day. On August 23, it was 349.

On August 28, the Salt Lake County health department released data showing that the workplaces that had the most workers infected were in manufacturing, retail, construction, transportation, and food and beverage service.

=== September 2020 ===
By September 1, there had been 14 outbreaks in schools since public schools began opening on August 13.

On September 4, the seven-day average number of new cases rose again to 411. The number of school outbreaks for the new school year rose to 27. The upward trend in new cases continued in mid-September, driven by an increase in cases among college-aged people in Utah County. The seven-day average rose to 487. On September 16, the seven-day average of new cases rose to 585, the highest since peaking at 669 per day on July 22. By September 20, the seven-day average of new cases had risen to 835.

On September 22, Herbert ordered Orange phase guidelines to go into effect in Provo and Orem.

Granger High and Olympus High reported that in-person classes would be stopped after each school reported 15 active cases on September 23. The closures are recommended, not required, under State health recommendations. Not all schools have followed the recommendation. Out of eight schools with 15 or more confirmed cases two have continued in person classes. Another school in the Canyons School District switched to a mix of online and in-person learning after 15 cases were confirmed on September 11, but the school board voted to shut down in person classes after that number increased to 70.

On September 24, the seven-day average of new daily cases rose to a record of 916.

On September 27, Utah had the fourth-highest rate of infection per capita in the United States.

On September 28, the seven-day average of new daily cases rose to a record of 1,001.

On September 29, U.S. Senator Mike Lee announced that he tested positive for the coronavirus. He had attended Amy Coney Barrett's Supreme Court nomination ceremony at the Rose Garden, where others who had attended also tested positive within a week.

=== October 2020 ===
On October 2, a couple hundred people gathered at the Provo Courthouse to protest mask mandates.

On October 7, hospitalizations reached a record high with 226 patients concurrently admitted. The previous high was on July 24.

On October 8, The University of Utah Hospital's intensive care unit was at 95% capacity, and their testing sites remained at capacity. In a news briefing, Dr. Eddie Stenehjem of Intermountain Healthcare said, "our hospitals are full". The state set a new record high in the seven-day average of 1,114 positive tests per day. The number of patients concurrently admitted reached a record high of 237. The death toll reached 501. The next day, Intermountain Healthcare said, "All of our facilities are seeing very high volumes".

On October 12, a spokesman for the Division of Emergency Management was very concerned that the state's intensive care beds would get over 75% full.

On October 13, Gov. Herbert replaced the state's color-coded guidelines with a new system that rates counties as having high, moderate, or low transmission, depending on its per-capita rate of new cases, the percent of tests that are positive, and statewide hospitalization trends. Counties with a high level will have masks required in public indoor settings, as well as outdoors if social distancing isn't possible. Local governments can decide whether and how to enforce the rules. Counties initially rated as high were Salt Lake, Utah, Cache, Wasatch, Juab, and Garfield counties. Counties with moderate levels will temporarily have to require masks and limit gatherings until October 29. Fifteen counties were initially rated as moderate. The system also replaced detailed industry guidelines with a few high-level guidelines to all businesses.

On October 15, hospitals were quickly running out of room for critical-care patients, with cases among older people continuing to rise and flu season beginning. In a news briefing, Dr. Stenehjem said that the healthcare system has never seen so many patients and has been distributing patients between hospitals. He said that they're getting to opening up overflow ICUs. Dr. Michael Ott, the director of Intermountain Medical Center said that the situation is not sustainable. The weekly infection rate was at a record high, averaging 1,204 per day. State officials say a large number of infected people are not getting tested. Local infection rates reached record-highs in Tooele County, Central Utah, and Southeast Utah health districts, as well as Southwest Utah health district where hospital capacity was close to maxing out in June.

On October 16, the University of Utah Hospital ICU reached "more than 100% capacity", with doctors and nurses working extra shifts.

=== November 2020 ===
On November 8, Governor Gary Herbert sent a wireless emergency alert to all Utah cellphones to "Tune into local TV stations around 9:30pm". Later in the day, Herbert issued a statewide mask mandate, paused extracurricular activities, and asked Utahns to limit gatherings to households only.

=== December 2020 ===
On December 15, over ninety health care workers received their first vaccine shots, the first distributed shots in the state.

On December 30, 4,670 positive cases were reported.

=== January 2021 ===
On January 8, the Utah Department of Health reported 4,839 new cases, the highest single-day count since the beginning of the pandemic. Mostly because of the recent holidays people traveled to gather with family and friends despite top health officials warning not to do so.

On January 18, COVID-19 vaccines were made available to all people age 70 and above.

On Jan 28, the Utah Department of Health reported 35 deaths, the most for a single day in Utah.

=== February 2021 ===
In the month of February, case and death counts declined drastically due to continued mask wearing, physical distancing, and COVID-19 vaccinations being administered.

=== March 2021 ===
On March 1, COVID-19 vaccines were made available to all people aged 65 and older.

On March 3, the state legislature passed HB294, dubbed the pandemic "endgame" bill, which lifts the statewide mask mandate on April 10, lifts school-based face mask directives on July 1, and sets conditions for the automatic expiration of local health departments' mask requirements. The next day, Rep. Jon Hawkins, who had been hospitalized since January due to COVID-19, appeared at the House chamber through a video call from his hospital bed. He was able to speak to the chamber with a tracheotomy valve and vote on the remaining bills. After being unconscious for several weeks, he said he would have to "learn how to walk and swallow and do all those basic things we take for granted".

On March 18, during a monthly news conference Governor Spencer Cox announced starting March 24, all Utahns ages 16 and older can get the COVID-19 vaccine.

On March 24, Governor Cox signed HB294.

On March 25, Governor Cox received his first dose of the COVID-19 vaccine.

=== April 2021 ===
On April 1, Governor Cox announced that over 500,000 Utahns are now fully vaccinated for COVID-19 and none of the state's counties remain on the "High" level of the state's transmission index.

On April 10, Utah's mask mandate ended, with exception of K-12 schools (still requiring masks until June 15), gatherings with more than 50 people, and State buildings. Local governments and businesses are allowed to mandate masks.

After peaking in early April, vaccinations began to drop sharply.

=== May and June 2021 ===
On May 4, the Utah Department of Health declared the expiration of all local public health orders related to COVID-19.

On May 12, the Utah Department of Health recommended that vaccine providers offer the vaccine to children aged 12 and over.

On May 27, 37% of Utahns were fully vaccinated.

In early June, the Delta variant became the most frequent variant in Utah, and cases began rising again. On June 19, nearly 42% of the state was fully vaccinated.

=== July 2021 ===
On July 27, the great majority of Utah's counties had a transmission level that fell within the CDC's new recommendation for even vaccinated people to wear indoor masks. Just over 45% of the state was fully vaccinated.

=== August 2021 ===
On August 2, 82.1% of intensive care beds in the state were filled. The Utah Hospital Association reactivated its transfer center to help move patients to hospitals with available beds. Angela Dunn, executive director of the Salt Lake County Health Department, said that Utah no longer had surge capacity because many health care workers had left due to burnout.

On August 12, the First Presidency of the Church of Jesus Christ of Latter-day Saints issued a statement urging individuals to be vaccinated and to use face masks.

== Government response ==
A statewide state of emergency was declared by Governor Herbert, and all schools were ordered closed and to switch to online classes by March 18. Statewide high school activities were canceled. The public school closure was extended through May 1. Later it was extended for the rest of the school year. The state prohibited gatherings of more than 10 individuals, with exceptions, and dine-in service in restaurants. The state ordered that all elective surgeries and procedures shall be postponed to prepare the healthcare system for a surge in coronavirus patients. Salt Lake, Davis, Weber/Morgan, Tooele, Summit, and Wasatch counties issued stay-at-home orders. Mountain America Expo Center in Sandy was set up as an overflow patient treatment center. The state ordered all adults entering the state to fill out an online travel declaration, with notice initially delivered using Wireless Emergency Alerts in mobile coverage areas near the state border (although this was later stopped and replaced with road signs due to technical issues, including reports of residents in nearby regions who received the alert repeatedly).

=== Phased Guidelines system ===
The state's Phased Guidelines system is divided into red, orange, yellow, and green phases.

==== Orange ====
General guidelines for individuals:

- Gather in groups of twenty or fewer while maintaining social distancing.
- Leave home infrequently, and stay six feet away from others.
- Wear face coverings in public settings.
- Maintain social distancing during outdoor recreation.
- Limit out-of-state travel.
- Churches should keep space between immediate households, alternate schedules for small gatherings, and stream services.

General guidelines for businesses:

- High-contact businesses can operate under strict protocols.
- Restaurant takeout, pickup, or delivery is encouraged. Dine-in services are allowed with extreme precaution.
- Offer telecommuting options when possible, follow strict hygiene policies, and continue social distancing in the workplace.

==== Yellow ====
General guidelines for individuals:

- Gather in groups of fifty or fewer while maintaining social distancing.
- Stay six feet away from others when outside the home.
- Wear face coverings when social distancing is difficult to maintain.
- Check for symptoms before engaging in close-contact or team sports.
- Limit out-of-state travel.
- Churches should keep space between immediate households, alternate schedules for small gatherings, and stream services.

General guidelines for businesses:

- All businesses should open and take reasonable precautions.
- Dine-in service is open with appropriate social distancing and hygiene measures.
- Encourage flexible work arrangements, follow hygiene policies, and continue social distancing in the workplace.

=== Contact tracing ===
A proprietary COVID-19 contact tracing app and service used for digital contact tracing, called Healthy Together, was made available in Utah. It was first launched in April, and it became operational on June 30, 2020.

== Impact on sports ==
The National Basketball Association suspended its 2019–20 season on March 11, after Utah Jazz player Rudy Gobert tested positive for COVID-19 prior to a game against the Oklahoma City Thunder. A game between the New Orleans Pelicans and Sacramento Kings was also cancelled as a precaution, as the game was being worked by a referee who had recently worked a Jazz game (although they would later test negative). Almost all other sports leagues and competitions followed suit in the days that followed.

== Statistics ==
COVID-19 pandemic medical cases in Utah by county
| District and county (Note: County where individuals with a positive case reside. Location of diagnosis and treatment may vary.) | Cases by county (Note: Reported confirmed and presumptive cases. Actual case numbers are probably higher.) | Cases by district (Note: Includes 4,960 cases from unknown counties.) | Hosp. (Note: Includes 69 hospitalized cases from unknown counties.) (Note: "–" denotes that no data is currently available for that county, not that the value is zero.) | Deaths by county | Deaths by district (Note: Includes 8 deaths from unknown counties.) | Recov. (Note: UDOH is not providing recovered case numbers by county. Local health departments could be providing this information at their discretion.) | Vaccine (Note: Includes 67,092 nonresidents or persons from unknown counties.) | Population (Note: 2020 population estimate from "State and County Population Estimates with Components of Change: 2010-2020". The University of Utah.) | Cases / 100k | Ref. |
|---|---|---|---|---|---|---|---|---|---|---|
| 29 / 29 | | 1,113,881 | 44,324 | | 5,455 | 1,103,895 | 2,084,460 | 3,272,996 | 34,032.5 | |
| Bear River | | 59,088 | 2,611 | | 279 | – | 107,177 | | 30,556.5 | |
| Box Elder (Note: Bear River health district comprises Box Elder, Cache, and Rich Counties.) | 15,196 | | – | 134 | | – | | 57,207 | | |
| Cache | 39,859 | | – | 118 | | – | | 133,741 | | |
| Rich | 364 | | – | 3 | | – | | 2,425 | | |
| Central Utah | | 23,412 | 1,137 | | 188 | – | 35,340 | | 27,569.2 | |
| Juab (Note: Central health district comprises Juab, Millard, Piute, Sanpete, Sevier, and Wayne Counties.) | 2,884 | | – | 24 | | 2,857 | | 12,635 | | |
| Millard | 3,264 | | – | 36 | | 3,226 | | 13,884 | | |
| Piute | 304 | | – | 8 | | 296 | | 1,726 | | |
| Sanpete | 8,351 | | – | 63 | | 8,276 | | 31,494 | | |
| Sevier | 5,428 | | – | 33 | | 5,391 | | 22,414 | | |
| Wayne | 440 | | – | 0 | | 439 | | 2,768 | | |
| Davis | 123,057 | | 3,795 | 469 | | – | 236,141 | 359,925 | 34,189.6 | |
| Salt Lake | 419,514 | | 18,930 | 1,909 | | – | 814,351 | 1,164,859 | 36,014.1 | |
| San Juan | 5,615 | | 258 | 53 | | – | 7,844 | 16,769 | 33,484.4 | |
| Southeast Utah | | 12,191 | 408 | | 104 | – | 21,381 | | 28,758.5 | |
| Carbon (Note: Southeast Utah health district comprises Carbon, Emery, and Grand Counties.) | 5,197 | | – | 46 | | 5,196 | | 21,628 | | |
| Emery | 2,465 | | – | 28 | | 2,465 | | 10,663 | | |
| Grand | 2,275 | | – | 6 | | 2,267 | | 10,100 | | |
| Southwest Utah | | 74,232 | 3,877 | | 722 | – | 128,006 | | 28,034.1 | |
| Beaver (Note: Southwest Utah health district comprises Beaver, Garfield, Iron, Kane, and Washington Counties.) | – | | – | – | | – | | 6,990 | | |
| Garfield | – | | – | – | | – | | 5,229 | | |
| Iron | – | | – | – | | – | | 56,878 | | |
| Kane | – | | – | – | | – | | 7,817 | | |
| Washington | – | | – | – | | – | | 187,878 | | |
| Summit | 16,407 | | 416 | 30 | | – | 36,920 | 41,970 | 39,092.2 | |
| Tooele | 25,475 | | 918 | 118 | | – | 41,949 | 72,692 | 35,045.1 | |
| Tricounty | | 15,344 | 1,417 | | 124 | – | 21,901 | | 25,951.4 | |
| Daggett (Note: Tricounty health district comprises Daggett, Duchesne, and Uintah Counties, and also includes the Ute Indian Tribe.) | – | | – | – | | – | | 1,024 | | |
| Duchesne | – | | – | – | | – | | 20,894 | | |
| Uintah | – | | – | – | | – | | 37,208 | | |
| Ute Indian Tribe | – | | – | – | | – | | | | |
| Utah | 229,307 | | 6,642 | 897 | | – | 381,387 | 670,844 | 34,181.9 | |
| Wasatch | 12,505 | | 260 | 40 | | – | 21,081 | 33,444 | 37,390.9 | |
| Weber-Morgan | | 92,774 | 3,586 | | 514 | – | 163,890 | | 34,631.4 | |
| Morgan (Note: Weber-Morgan health district comprises Morgan, and Weber Counties.) | 2,799 | | – | 15 | | – | | 12,422 | | |
| Weber | 80,051 | | – | 458 | | – | | 255,468 | | |
Final update November 2, 2023, with data through the previous day (district); Updated September 1, 2022 (county); District data is publicly reported by Utah Department of Health

== See also ==
- COVID-19 pandemic in the Navajo Nation
- Timeline of the COVID-19 pandemic in the United States
- COVID-19 pandemic in the United States – for impact on the country
- COVID-19 pandemic – for impact on other countries
