= List of killings by law enforcement officers in the United States, August 2017 =

This is a list of people reported killed by non-military law enforcement officers in the United States in August 2017, whether in the line of duty or not, and regardless of reason or method. The listing documents the occurrence of a death, making no implications regarding wrongdoing or justification on the part of the person killed or officer involved. Killings are arranged by date of the incident that caused death. Different death dates, if known, are noted in the description. The table below lists 95 people.

== August 2017 ==
Date	Name (age) of deceased	Race	State (city)	Description
2017-08-31	Debi Lynn Thorkelson (54)	White	Florida (Fort Myers Beach)	
2017-08-30	Isaac Lopez Cervantes (22)	Hispanic	California (Milpitas)	
2017-08-30	Thomas Daniel Littlecloud (32)	Native American	California (Sacramento)	
2017-08-29	Aaron Brandon (17)	Black	Illinois (Hazel Crest)	
2017-08-29	Larry Moore Miller (68)	Unknown race	Alabama (Jacksonville)	
2017-08-29	Brandy Caldwell (46)	White	Texas (Watauga)	
2017-08-29	Joshua Mark Cloud (22)	White	Louisiana (Simsboro)	
2017-08-29	Austin Hunter Turner (23)	White	Tennessee (Bristol)	
2017-08-29	Ricky Ard (55)	Black	Indiana (Evansville)	Ard had been escorted out of a federal courthouse after a disagreement on the 28th. On the 29th he returned, carrying a baseball bat. Ard smashed windows in the front entrance before courthouse security officers forced him away from the doors. An Evansville police officer arrived and used a Taser on Ard, but that had no apparent effect. When Ard charged at the police officer with the bat, the officer shot him.
2017-08-28	Kostatinos Sfaelos (62)	White	Connecticut (New Milford)	According to officers, Sfaelos was carrying a shotgun that he refused to drop. One officer shot Sfaelos after he raised the shotgun, which was unloaded, towards police.
2017-08-28	William Matthew Holmes (24)	Black	Kansas (Moundridge)	
2017-08-28	Anthony Antonio Ford (27)	Black	Florida (Miami)	
2017-08-27	William Wilson (26)	Hispanic	New Mexico (Farmington)	
2017-08-27	Jason Hoops (33)	White	Ohio (Kettering)	
2017-08-27	Dwayne Martin (34)	White	Kentucky (Sharpsburg)	
2017-08-26	Damon Grimes (15)	Black	Michigan (Detroit)	Grimes was riding on an ATV when a state trooper tased him from a car. This led to Grimes crashing into a nearby pickup truck, killing him. The trooper was later convicted of involuntary manslaughter.
2017-08-26	Ulises Erives (18)	Hispanic	Oklahoma (Guymon)	
2017-08-26	Michael Malik Kawon Lee (18)	Black	Arkansas (Pine Bluff)	
2017-08-25	Charles David Robinson (47)	Black	Georgia (Woodville)	
2017-08-25	Kristen Ambury (28)	White	Florida (Sunrise)	
2017-08-25	Devin Howell (30)	Black	Georgia (Marietta)	
2017-08-25	Daniel Edward Blyler (44)	White	Florida (Jacksonville)	
2017-08-24	Isaias Raziel Ochoa (19)	Hispanic	California (Lemon Grove)	
2017-08-24	Scott Mayfield (24)	Black	New Jersey (Orange)	
2017-08-24	Colton Puckett (28)	White	Michigan (Waterford Township)	
2017-08-23	Ciara Howard (26)	White	Kansas (Olathe)	
2017-08-22	Robert Earl Adams (30)	White	California (Santa Maria)	
2017-08-22	Henry Rivera Sr. (71)	Hispanic	New Mexico (Albuquerque)	
2017-08-22	Mark Aaron Jensen (56)	White	California (Durham)	
2017-08-22	Konstantin Morozov (48)	White	California (Tarzana)	
2017-08-22	Kenny "Kiwi" Herring (30)	Black	Missouri (St. Louis)	
2017-08-21	Nathaniel Richmond (51)	Black	Ohio (Steubenville)	Richmond, the father of Ma'Lik Richmond (convicted in the Steubenville High School rape case) opened fire on Jefferson County judge, Joseph Bruzzese Jr. Bruzzese returned fire, along with a county probation officer.
2017-08-21	Tyler D. Whitmire (22)	White	Wisconsin (Franklin)	
2017-08-21	Thomas Selje (64)	White	Wisconsin (Pardeeville)	
2017-08-21	Jeffrey Andrew Jacobs (42)	White	North Carolina (Morganton)	
2017-08-21	Dennis Flowers (66)	White	Colorado (Colorado City)	
2017-08-20	Keshawn Wilson (32)	Black	New Jersey (Brick)	
2017-08-20	Kellen J. Kyle (22)	White	Oklahoma (Marietta)	
2017-08-20	Name Withheld ()	Hispanic	California (Ridgecrest)	
2017-08-20	Jonathan Bolger (44)	White	Arkansas (Yellville)	
2017-08-19	Thomas Justin Walton (32)	White	Alabama (Birmingham)	
2017-08-19	Paul Egli (46)	White	Colorado (Denver)	
2017-08-18	Clarence Belsar III (26)	White	Pennsylvania (Fairchance)	
2017-08-18	Derrick Rashard Brabham (25)	Black	Florida (Jacksonville)	
2017-08-18	Christopher Michael Diaz (26)	Hispanic	California (Montebello)	
2017-08-18	Leroy Frank (60)	White	New Jersey (Bloomfield)	
2017-08-17	Edgar Ramirez Carreto (28)	Hispanic	Arizona (Phoenix)	
2017-08-17	Peter Daniel Grima (65)	White	Alabama (Luverne)	
2017-08-16	Kenneth Lewis (34)	Black	California (Los Angeles)	
2017-08-16	James Terry Midkiff (54)	White	California (Livermore)	
2017-08-15	Herbert Gilbert (37)	Black	Georgia (Thomasville)	Narcotics units executed a search warrant on Gilbert's house, and as they arrived he attempted to flee in his SUV. Officers responded by ramming a vehicle into the SUV and one of the officers fired 9 rounds into the SUV. All 9 rounds struck Gilbert in the upper body, who was pronounced dead by medics. The shooting sparked protest by the Black Lives Matter movement.
2017-08-15	Robert E. Bracewell (20)	White	Florida (Jacksonville)	Suspect killed by police after kidnapping 14-year-old.
2017-08-14	Steven James Young (45)	White	Colorado (Colorado Springs)	
2017-08-13	Hussein D. Hassan (46)	Black	Washington (Kennewick)	
2017-08-13	Carmen William Rongione (41)	White	Tennessee (Cosby)	
2017-08-13	Christopher Collins (24)	White	Georgia (Mount Airy)	
2017-08-13	Patrick Harmon (50)	Black	Utah (Salt Lake City)	Harmon was stopped for riding his bike at night without a proper light. The police officers discovered Harmon had an outstanding warrant and proceeded to arrest him. During the course of the arrest, Harmon bolted suddenly fleeing from the police officers. Cops drew their weapons and, reportedly, Harmon turned towards them while fleeing with a knife in his hand. The family of Harmon reports he had mental health issues. See also Killing of Patrick Harmon.
2017-08-13	Relvy Rodriguez-Palenzuela (34)	Hispanic	Florida (Miami Lakes)	
2017-08-13	Roger Burzinski (54)	White	Wisconsin (La Crosse)	
2017-08-11	Nicholas Andrew Solis ()	Hispanic	Texas (Channelview)	
2017-08-11	Tyrease Carlyle (31)	Black	Pennsylvania (Philadelphia)	
2017-08-10	Eric Paul Bogart (49)	White	California (Los Angeles)	
2017-08-10	Mark P. Coffey (33)	White	Indiana (Dyer)	
2017-08-10	Eduardo Navarrete-Cordero (35)	Hispanic	Washington (Frederickson)	After reports that Navarrete-Cordero had kidnapped his brother-in-law at knifepoint, deputies found him in the neighborhood. They ordered him to drop his knife. He refused, lunging at deputies, who opened fire at him, killing him.
2017-08-09	Eugene Nelson (20)	Black	Washington (Kent)	Police were attempting to contact Nelson over violating a protection order. Nelson fled in a vehicle, reportedly dragging a K-9 officer and his dog along with it. Police fired at the suspect, killing him.
2017-08-08	Peter James Robbins (23)	White	Kansas (Junction City)	
2017-08-08	Darreon J. Neal (17)	Black	Illinois (Dolton)	
2017-08-07	Winston Espino Sanchez (45)	Hispanic	New Jersey (North Bergen)	
2017-08-07	Jose M. Ortiz (29)	Hispanic	Kansas (Wichita)	
2017-08-07	Christopher K. Sales (36)	White	Missouri (Kansas City)	
2017-08-06	Kyle Andrew Lankford (32)	White	Tennessee (Bon Aqua)	
2017-08-06	Danatae Franklin (28)	Black	Missouri (Kansas City)	
2017-08-05	Timmy Wilson (24)	White	Ohio (New Straitsville)	
2017-08-05	Pablo Garcia-Garcia (35)	Hispanic	California (Santa Rosa)	Police responded to a call of a disturbance where a man stabbed and injured a man and was acting erratically while armed with a knife. According to police reports and bodycam footage, Garcia-Garcia was hiding under a bed with a knife; he brandished it as he came out toward officers, who shot him.
2017-08-05	Thomas Williams (34)	Black	Florida (Fort Lauderdale)	
2017-08-04	Melissa Wiseman (36)	White	Michigan (Marine City)	
2017-08-04	Aaron Payne (33)	Black	South Carolina (Myrtle Beach)	
2017-08-04	Cory Stephens (35)	White	Nevada (Spanish Springs)	
2017-08-04	Garrell Byrd (33)	White	Texas (Kress)	
2017-08-04	Todd Hurlburt (53)	White	California (Los Angeles)	
2017-08-04	Joseph Miller (54)	White	Pennsylvania (Clarendon)	
2017-08-04	James Lacy (47)	Black	California (San Diego)	
2017-08-04	Jeremy Douglas Gabrial (31)	White	Mississippi (Meridian)	
2017-08-03	Keith Burkholder (57)	White	Ohio (Lima)	
2017-08-02	Miguel Salas (25)	Hispanic	Nevada (Las Vegas)	Two police officers confronted Salas in his truck. After an argument where Salas refused to get out of the vehicle, he pulled out a firearm and fired a total of 9 shots at the officers, one of which struck one of the officers in the armpit. The two officers and returned fire, shooting a total of 10 rounds, one of which fatally struck Salas in the head.
2017-08-02	Philip Rhoades (28)	White	West Virginia (Worthington)	
2017-08-02	Preston Thornton (29)	Black	Louisiana (Coushatta)	
2017-08-02	Jeffery Barboa (45)	Hispanic	California (Richmond)	
2017-08-02	Quintas Harris (27)	Black	Georgia (Decatur)	
2017-08-02	Kemonte Cobbs (15)	Black	Indiana (Gary)	
2017-08-01	Mikle Eugene Dixon (42)	White	North Carolina (Mount Airy)	
2017-08-01	Franklin Oden (39)	White	California (Visalia)	
2017-08-01	Mark Anthony Sanchez (33)	Hispanic	California (Oregon House)	
2017-08-01	Kerry Demars Bradley (37)	Black	Texas (Waco)	
2017-08-01	Christopher E. Clapp (35)	Black	Maryland (Catonsville)	

== See also ==
- Death in custody § United States
- Henry A. Wallace Police Crime Public Database
- List of cases of police brutality
- List of countries with annual rates and counts for killings by law enforcement officers
- List of law enforcement officers killed in the line of duty in the United States
- List of law enforcement officers convicted for an on-duty killing in the United States
- List of shootings by US immigration agents
- List of police reforms related to the George Floyd protests
- List of unarmed African Americans killed by law enforcement officers in the United States
- Lists of killings by law enforcement officers
- Police brutality in the United States
- Police misconduct § United States
- Police riot § United States
- Police use of deadly force in the United States
