= Killing of Bernardo Palacios-Carbajal =

May 2020 police killing of a man in Salt Lake City, Utah

On May 23, 2020, police officers killed 22-year-old Bernardo Palacios-Carbajal in Salt Lake City, Utah. Officers fired 34 shots at Palacios-Carbajal, striking him 13–15 times, after chasing him while he ran away carrying a gun and repeatedly dropping it and retrieving it. The shooting triggered protests coinciding with the worldwide protests following the murder of George Floyd. Bodycam footage was released on June 5. District Attorney Sim Gill announced on July 9 that the shooting was legally justified and that the officers would not face criminal charges.

== Shooting ==
Shortly after 2 a.m. on May 23, 2020, multiple Salt Lake City police officers responded to a call alleging that a man had tried to rob someone at gunpoint outside a strip club in the area of 300 West and 900 South. Officers chased him around the motel and nightclub to a parking lot across the street. Bernardo fell 3 times and picked up the gun each time. Officers Kevin Fortuna and Neil Iversen fired their weapons. Once Bernardo fell to the ground face forward he rolled to his back and officers told Bernardo to show them his hands. Surveillance camera footage shows Bernardo raise his hands brandishing his gun towards officers. They fired again, totaling 34 shots, 13–15 of which struck Palacios-Carbajal, killing him. No officers were injured.

== Aftermath ==
Protests were planned for the Saturday after the killing, coinciding with worldwide protests following the murder of George Floyd. Several protests marched throughout the city, with protesters also calling for justice for Riche Antonio Santiago, Patrick Harmon, Elijah James Smith, and James Dudley-Barker, four others killed by Utah police.

Bodycam footage is required by city law to be released within 10 business days of a police shooting. Bodycam footage from three officers was released on June 5. The city council released a statement on June 7 decrying the shooting, and several hundred gathered at the state capitol to demand justice. The funeral for Palacios-Carbajal was held on June 10, with many attendants going to a protest directly afterwards. By June 13, a memorial had developed at the site of the shooting, and a mural of Palacios-Carbajal was painted next to one of George Floyd. Murals of Michael Chad Breinholt, Darrien Hunt, Dillon Taylor, and Bryan Pena Valencia, four other men fatally shot by Utah police since 2014, were painted on the same wall. People assembled at the new Salt Lake County District Attorney's Office, calling for the dismissal of District Attorney Sim Gill and protesting the police killings of Cody Belgard and Zane James, two other men fatally shot by Salt Lake County police in 2018, before going to a memorial for Palacios-Carbajal. Salt Lake City police turned the shooting investigation over to Unified Police, who submitted their report to Gill's office on June 16. An unusually high number of police officers had left the department in the preceding weeks. "They felt like they could go on and get an education and get into a different career," said police chief Mike Brown.

On June 17, protesters marched to the Salt Lake City government building and chanted, "Mayor, what happened to his fingers?" On June 23, it was reported that the family of Palacios-Carbajal said that some of his fingers were missing when they saw his body. Autopsy photos showed that some of his fingers were mangled.

On the morning of July 9, Salt Lake County District Attorney Sim Gill announced the ruling that the shooting was "justified" and there would be no charges. Utah law states that an officer is justified in using deadly force when "the officer reasonably believes that the use of deadly force is necessary to prevent death or serious bodily injury to the officer or another person". Mayor Erin Mendenhall said that the evidence in the case will be delivered to the city's civilian review board and that an internal investigation within the police department will get underway. Shortly after 8 p.m. the evening of July 9, protests broke out in response. By 10 p.m., several windows of the DA's office were broken, buckets of red paint were poured on the property, some reporters covering the event were interfered with and blocked from filming, and police reported members of the crowd using pepper spray on one of the officers, resulting in SLCPD declaring the group an unlawful gathering and dispersing the crowd. As a result, Governor Gary Herbert declared a state of emergency. In the weeks following the initial protests, protesters were charged with misdemeanors and felonies for vandalism, and failure to disperse, among other charges.

== See also ==
- George Floyd protests in Utah
- Lists of killings by law enforcement officers in the United States
- Tennessee v. Garner
- Fleeing felon rule
