= George Floyd protests in Utah =

2020 civil unrest after the murder of George Floyd

- Part of George Floyd protests
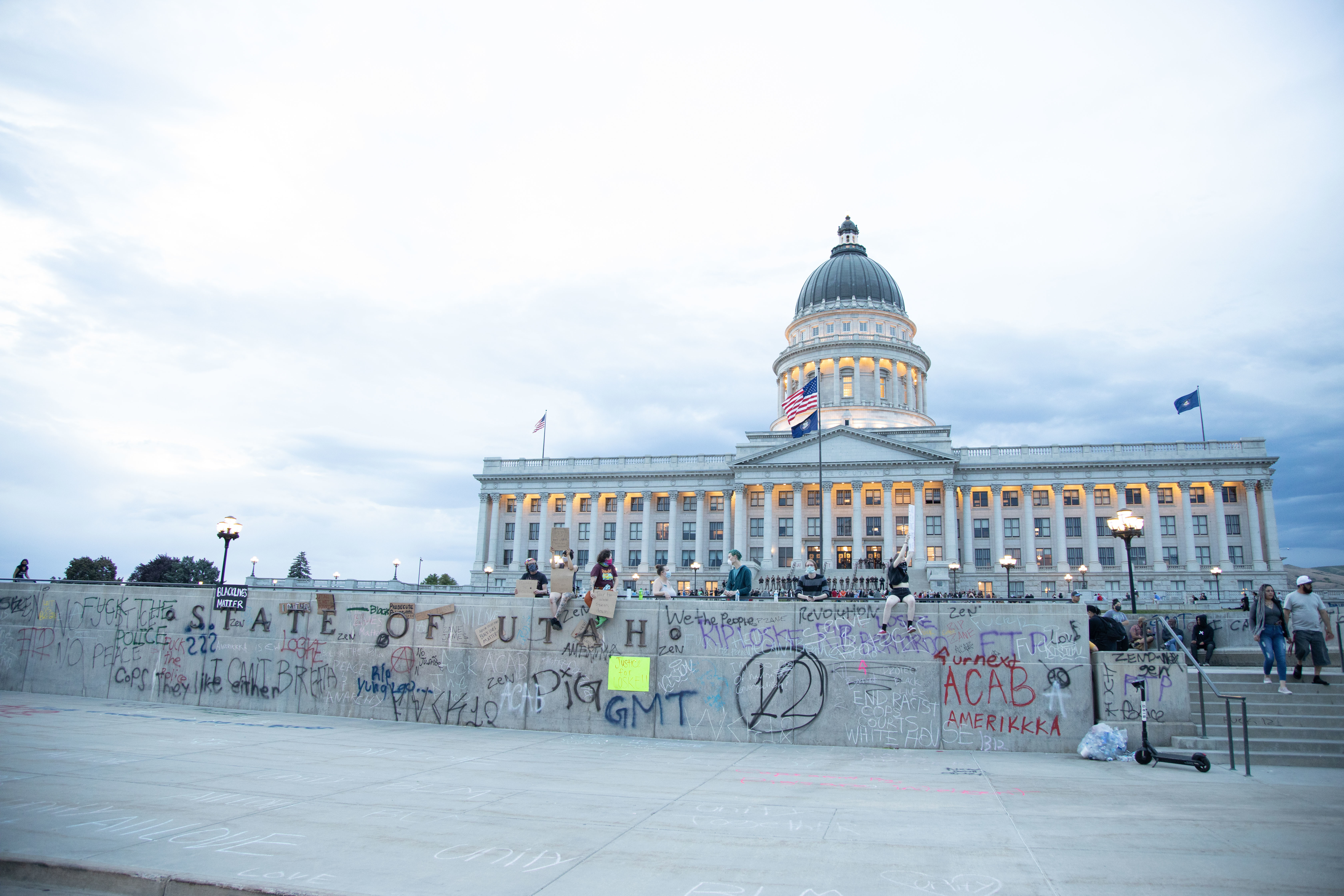
- Anti-police graffiti on the site of the Utah State Capitol building on May 29
- Date: May 26 – June 29, 2020 (1 month and 3 days)
- Location: Various locations in the U.S. state of Utah
- Caused by: Reaction to the murder of George Floyd by the Minneapolis Police Department; Reaction to the Killing of Bernardo Palacios-Carbajal by the Salt Lake City Police Department; Institutional racism against African Americans; Economic, racial and social inequality
- Goals: Justice for George Floyd; End to police brutality
- Methods: Protests, demonstrations, civil disobedience, civil resistance

This is a list of protests in the U.S. state of Utah related to the murder of George Floyd.

== Locations ==
=== Cedar City ===
More than 100 people gathered and marched in downtown Cedar City on Sunday, May 31. During the two-hour event, participants walked through downtown, waving signs with phrases like “Black Lives Matter” and shouting chants such as “no justice, no peace” and “say his name: George Floyd.”

=== Cottonwood Heights ===
On June 15, one pro-police rally and one pro-reform rally were held at the same spot, with both drawing around 100 protesters. The event remained peaceful despite arguments.

=== Logan ===
On June 2, more than 100 protesters gathered at the historic Cache County courthouse to protest police brutality. Two police officers supported the protesters and brought them refreshments. A second, larger protest on June 6 drew about 350 attendees.

=== Moab ===
On June 5, over 400 people marched in downtown Moab and blocked Highway 191 to protest police brutality. Police Chief Bret Edge took part in the protest, and the Moab Police Department promised to review its policies and take recommendations from residents.

=== Ogden ===
On May 30, around 1,000 people attended the "Take a Knee" protest in front of the Ogden City Municipal Building after turnout was only expected to reach 70 to 200; police barricaded numerous streets due to this higher-than-anticipated turnout. It was largely peaceful, with protesters opting to utilize verbal chants and speeches rather than violence. After the conclusion of the protest, protesters shook hands with police officers.

=== Park City ===
On June 1, an estimated 300 people gathered at Dozier Field in a demonstration, where they took a knee for eight minutes and forty-six seconds in honor of George Floyd.

=== Provo ===
A small car caravan organized by Utah County Against Police Brutality raised awareness on May 30 for George Floyd and Bernardo Palacios, the latter of whom was killed by Salt Lake City Police on May 23. Later that afternoon evening, between "dozens" and "hundreds" of protesters demonstrated in front of the Provo Police Department building downtown.

On the night of June 29, a man in an SUV was shot while moving an SUV through a crowd of protesters at the intersection of University Avenue and Center Street. Police said that the driver was shot and that his wounds were not life-threatening. The driver of the SUV was not charged and three protesters were arrested in connection with a shooting and Provo protest, one was accused of attempted aggravated murder, aggravated assault, rioting and threatening the use of a weapon in a fight, the other was accused of obstruction of justice and rioting. Later a third man was arrested and charged with aggravated assault and riot. In June 2026, Jesse Taggart received a 15-year to life sentence for his role in the Provo unrest.

=== Saint George ===
Two separate protests, organized by the Southern Utah Black Lives Matter chapter, were held on May 30. Troy Anderson, the founder of the Southern Utah chapter, addressed a crowd of about 50 to 60 people at 10 in the morning outside the city offices; Anderson spoke with Saint George's mayor afterwards. Later that evening, a crowd of approximately 200 protesters took a "kneel-in" along the city's main boulevard. Nearly 1,000 people gathered on June 4 and lay in the streets silently for 8'46".

=== Salt Lake City ===
On May 29, around 150 to 200 people protested downtown at 900 South and State Street. Beginning on Saturday morning, downtown was packed as hundreds drove and marched peacefully from the Salt Lake City police headquarters to the state capitol on capitol hill, where about a thousand people gathered. Protesters sprayed graffiti on parts of the Utah State Capitol Building. The protests downtown later turned violent as protesters overturned a SLCPD police cruiser and set it ablaze. Looting started at 7-Eleven Far-right groups arrived carrying firearms. A man who identified himself as Brandon McCormick drove his vehicle into the crowd and aimed a bow and arrow at protesters, reportedly fired off an arrow, after responding to a stranger who asked him if he calls himself an American with: "Yes, I'm American. All lives matter." This prompted other protesters to tackle him to the ground and overturn his car, which caught on fire. Governor Gary Herbert activated the National Guard, deploying 200 soldiers and a Black Hawk helicopter. Mayor Erin Mendenhall was on board the military helicopter and imposed the city's first citywide curfew from Saturday night to Monday morning. Police from thirteen other cities and from the county sheriff were brought into Salt Lake City, using a high school as a staging area. Highway patrol troopers and U.S. marshals were stationed at capitol hill. Police used armored vehicles and tear gas and fired rubber bullets at protesters. All the graffiti at the capitol was removed as the curfew continued through all of Sunday. After it lifted on Monday morning, troops and military vehicles continued to be stationed at several locations downtown. Hundreds gathered for a largely peaceful protest at the police headquarters. Mendenhall issued another curfew order, this time only at night times but lasting a week. Herbert declared an emergency closing the capitol to the public, and the capitol remained under heavy guard.

On May 30, a Salt Lake City police officer was filmed pushing an unarmed, 67-year-old man walking with a cane to the ground. The officer was removed from patrol duties pending an internal affairs investigation, and the chief of police also asked the Civilian Review Board to conduct a review. A female police officer was driving a police car and was then surrounded by an angry mob who banged on the windows, prompting her to leave the vehicle. The car was overturned, damaged with fists, feet, and objects including skateboards and flag poles, and then set on fire. Through June 17, eight people were arrested in the vehicle's damage: seven males and one female ranging from ages 18 to 31. The charges, which differ with each individual charged, include felony rioting, felony criminal mischief, and federal charges of arson. The arson charges carry a minimum of five years imprisonment and a maximum of 20 years.

=== Tooele ===
On June 26, over 200 people marched from the Tooele City Veterans Memorial to the city park and back in support of Black Lives Matter. The Tooele County Democratic Party held a coinciding event at the city park where speakers rallied against police brutality. The event ended with a moment of silence for eight minutes and forty-six seconds. Despite rumors of vandalism which prompted counter-protesters to stand and protect monuments, the protest remained peaceful.

== See also ==
- Killing of Bernardo Palacios-Carbajal
- Shooting of Linden Cameron
