= Reginald Latson =

American man convicted of assault

Reginald Cornelius "Neli" Latson is an American autistic and intellectually disabled man who became the subject of national media attention after he was arrested in 2010. Latson was approached by a sheriff's deputy while waiting outside a library, and the interaction turned into a fight, in which the deputy was injured. He was sentenced to prison, followed by a regiment of mental health treatment programs. While in a group home, Latson was arrested after another altercation with an officer and returned to prison. In prison, while on suicide watch, he was placed in solitary confinement for nearly a year. Disability and civil rights organizations (as well as Latson's mother) argued that the corrections system was causing Latson's mental health to deteriorate, and that racial bias influenced how he was treated in prison. They lobbied for clemency, and he was given a conditional pardon in 2015, and then a full pardon in 2021.

== Arrest ==
At the time of his arrest on May 24, 2010, Latson was 18 years old and lived with his mother Lisa Alexander in Stafford, Virginia. His IQ was 69, one point lower than the threshold of intellectual disability. He had also struggled with depression. He had changed schools multiple times, struggling in both special-needs schools and large public schools. In 2009, he had pled guilty to a charge of misdemeanor assault, and given a suspended sentence of 30 days.

Latson had left the house early that morning to go to the public library, where he often went. Finding it closed, he sat on the grass outside to wait for it to open. At 8:37 a.m., the Stafford County Sheriff's Office received a call about a "suspicious male, possibly in possession of a gun" outside the library and launched a search. Later investigation would confirm that the original caller had not seen a gun. The sheriff's deputy serving as a school resource officer at the elementary school across the street noticed Latson, approached him, and asked for identification. According to the deputy's account, Latson attacked the deputy and ran away, leaving him with lacerations and a broken ankle. After a search with police dogs, Latson was found in a nearby wooded area and arrested. Latson initially faced three charges: malicious wounding of a law enforcement officer, assault and battery of a law enforcement officer, and knowingly disarming a police officer in performance of his official duties. He was sent to jail before trial, although he spent some time at a psychiatric hospital for competency evaluation. The deputy would soon retire due to the ankle injury: he had worked in law enforcement for 33 years.

Alexander accepted that he injured the deputy, but believed that the deputy had attempted to grab Latson as he walked away and Latson reacted with a fight-or-flight response, which can be extreme in autistic individuals. She later filed a complaint against the sheriff with the United States Department of Justice, stating she was not allowed to see Latson until a few days after he was arrested. Alexander started a web site to raise money for Latson's legal bills and to raise awareness, and stated that he needed treatment, not prison.

== First trial ==
Latson was indicted by a grand jury in the summer of 2010. His trial began on March 2, 2011, where he pled of not guilty by reason of insanity. A psychiatrist testified that Latson suffered from several disorders, including Asperger's, intermittent explosive disorder and attention deficit disorder. Latson did not testify, but the defense presented transcripts and video where Latson disputed the deputy's account. Latson stated that the deputy used racial slurs and other verbal abuse and attempted to sexually assault him, and that the deputy's ankle injury was caused by the deputy kicking Latson. Latson also said that other deputies and police dogs attacked him during the search. The prosecution said that Latson's injuries were not consistent with his account. The prosecution argued instead that, while Latson did have autism, he also possessed "violent tendencies" and "racial hate and this hate for law enforcement" that were unrelated to his disabilities. The prosecution used the outdated term "retarded" while dismissing the insanity defense as a "convenience", and asserted that since the deputy had an adult "mentally retarded" child, the deputy was sensitive to children with disabilities.

On March 4, the jury found Latson guilty of two felony charges, assault on a law enforcement officer and wounding in the commission of a felony, and two misdemeanor charges, disarming a police officer and obstruction of justice. They recommended a prison sentence of ten and a half years. Shortly thereafter, Latson was convicted of breaking and entering with the intent to commit assault for a 2009 incident where Latson went to another student's home and began punching him, adding seven months of prison. Alexander said she would appeal the rulings.

Advocacy organizations for autistic and disabled people paid close attention to the trial, including Autism Speaks and the Arc of Northern Virginia. In news reports, several parents of autistic teens stated that their child could have reacted the same way in Latson's place. More than 50 people wrote letters to the judge asking for leniency in sentencing.

On May 31, the judge sentenced Latson to two years in prison, including a year of time served waiting for trial, and suspended the remaining eight years. A condition of the reduced time was that Latson attend residential treatment programs once released, and be subject to intensive probation. Latson's defense had argued for his transfer to a hospital, followed by a residential program, without additional jail time. While some advocates felt that the judge's reduced sentence was encouraging, Alexander still felt the sentence was unjust, and feared that Latson could become suicidal in prison.

== Further charges and conditional pardon ==
In August of 2013, Latson was arrested at a group home after he threatened to harm himself and staff called the police. He was accused of assaulting an officer and trying to take his weapon. The officer was not harmed. In December, a grand jury indicted him on these counts. The lawyers made largely the same arguments as the first trial. In March of 2014, Latson was convicted on the two counts as well as a probation violation, and ordered back to prison for a year, where he spent time in solitary confinement.

A few months later, Latson was charged with assaulting a corrections officer at the Rappahannock Regional Jail. Latson was on suicide watch, and was being moved between areas of the jail when the assault occurred. The officer was not seriously injured. According to a later lawsuit, Latson was tased and then strapped to a restraint chair for nearly nine hours. He was then kept in solitary confinement for longer than a month in a cell that lacked a proper bed and toilet. Then he was transferred to the Marion Treatment Center where he spent several more months in isolation. According to the ACLU of Virginia, Latson had been taken off his psychiatric medication before the incident occurred. He was convicted of the assault and another probation violation, and given a sentence of six months in prison, to be followed by a five-year stay in a residential treatment facility in Florida.

One newspaper, the San Francisco Bay View, had already called for Latson's pardon in 2011. With this new trial, the attention intensified. Ruth Marcus wrote about the case regularly in her opinion column at the Washington Post. The Washington Post and The Virginian-Pilot published supporting editorials. Aside from newspapers, the Autistic Self Advocacy Network (ASAN), the Arc, and the ACLU of Virginia called for his release.

Concurrently with the events described so far, Virginia's mental health system had been the subject of investigation by the federal Department of Justice. A 2008 investigation of the Central Virginia Training Center had been extended to encompass Virginia's mental health system at large. One finding was that the state needlessly institutionalized the intellectually disabled, and failed to provide adequate community-based treatment.

On January 20, 2015, Latson was given a conditional pardon by Governor Terry McAuliffe. This sent him directly to the residential treatment program rather than further jail. The pardon stipulated that Latson remain under supervision, with the possibility of being arrested and returned to prison if any violation occurred. Alexander described the supervision as very restrictive, and that Latson could do little without asking permission from his group home and his probation officer.

== Suit and full pardon ==
In 2016, attorneys representing Latson filed a federal suit against officials of the Virginia Department of Corrections, stating that he was subjected to cruel and inhuman conditions, including long periods of solitary confinement. Although Latson had been released from prison at this point, the lawsuit said prison had caused "serious psychological and physiological harm", leading to difficulty adapting to the world outside prison, and that "he experiences severe anxiety and fear in the presence of authority figures." The suit was dismissed on the grounds of qualified immunity.

After an appeal affirmed the lower court's decision, and around the time of the George Floyd protests in 2020, Latson began to receive outside attention once more. An attorney for the Arc argued that being under probation imposed constant anxiety and trauma on Latson. On June 21, 2021, Governor Ralph Northam issued a full pardon for Latson, which removed him from all supervision. His convictions remain on his criminal record.

As of 2021, Latson lived together with Alexander in Florida.

== See also ==
- Shooting of Charles Kinsey
- Killing of Eyad al-Hallaq
- Shooting of Linden Cameron
