= Sim Gill =

American attorney and politician (born 1961)

District Attorney of Salt Lake County, Utah
- Incumbent
- Assumed office 2010

Personal details
- Born: 1961 (age 64–65) India
- Party: Utah Democratic Party
- Education: Kearns High School, University of Utah (BA), Lewis and Clark Law School (JD)

Simarjit Singh Gill (born 1961) is an Indian-American attorney and politician, the District Attorney for Salt Lake County, Utah, first elected to the office in November 2010.

== Early life and education ==
Gill was born in India into a Punjabi Sikh family. He lived in India until he was at least the age of eight, and graduated from Kearns High School. Gill graduated from the University of Utah with a B.A. degree in History and Philosophy. He received his J.D. degree and certificate of specialization in Environmental and Natural Resources Law from Northwestern School of Law (now Lewis & Clark Law School) at Lewis and Clark College in Portland, Oregon. Gill was admitted to the Utah Bar in 1993.

== Career ==
Before his District Attorney election, Sim Gill worked as Salt Lake City's Chief Prosecutor. Gill ran for district attorney in 2006, losing to Lohra Miller. He defeated her in the 2010 election.

On March 18, 2014, Gill announced his bid for a second term, and in November of the same year, defeated Republican challenger Steve Nelson, retaining his position as the District Attorney. In 2018, Gill announced that he would run for a third term, and in November of the same year, defeated challenger Nathan Evershed.

Gill has collaborated on the creation and implementation of various therapeutic justice programs and alternatives to prosecution, including Mental Health Court, Veterans Court, Salt Lake City Domestic Violence Court, Misdemeanor Drug Court and the Salt Lake Area Family Justice Center.

== Prominent cases ==
Gill participated in the prosecution of Brian David Mitchell, the man found guilty of the 2002 kidnapping of Elizabeth Smart. He filed felony corruption and bribery charges against Utah Attorneys General Mark Shurtleff and John Swallow in 2014. Charges against Shurtleff were dropped in 2016, and Swallow was found not guilty of all charges in 2017.

In July 2020 Gill ruled that the killing of Bernardo Palacios-Carbajal by police officers was justified, after video footage showed Palacios-Carbajal brandished a gun at officers. A crowd gathered at the District Attorney’s office to protest Gill’s decision, which eventually led to vandalism of the DA’s office as well as the surrounding road and allegations that protestors used pepper spray on responding officers. Gill charged seven protestors with "gang enhancement" crimes which carry sentences up to life in prison.

In August 2023, Gill announced that he would not charge officer Matthew Farillas, who had shot Linden Cameron, a 13-year-old unarmed autistic boy, six times. Cameron's mother stated, "He [Gill] seemed like he was doing more of the defense attorney's work than the prosecutor's, so... it just doesn't make sense."
