= Healthy Together =

Public health technology company

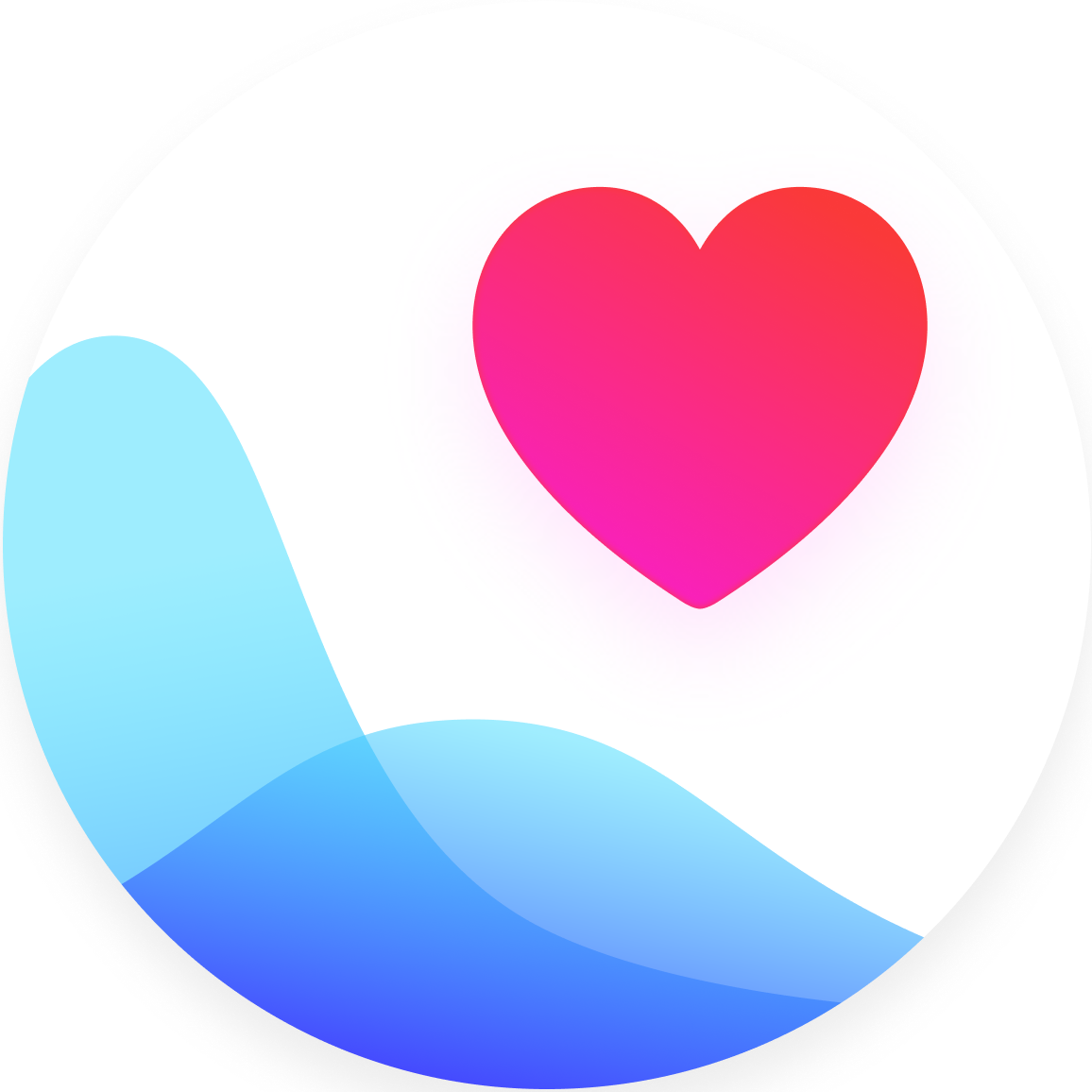
- Developer(s): Twenty Labs, LLC
- Operating system: Android, iOS, Web
- Size: 42 MB (Android), 50.6 MB (iOS)
- License: Closed-source Proprietary Freeware
- Website: healthytogether.co

Healthy Together is a health technology company that provides software for Health & Humans Services Departments.

Healthy Together supports a “One Door” approach to eligibility, enrollment, and management for programs like Medicaid, Supplemental Nutrition Assistance Program, TANF and WIC, as well as behavioral health (988), disease surveillance, vital records, child welfare and more. The platform's use is to increase the reach and efficacy of program initiatives, improve health equity and reduce cost.

Software is available in the United States of America with current deployments in Florida, Oklahoma. The United States Department of Veterans Affairs also utilizes Healthy Together's mobile platform.

== Development ==
Healthy Together launched in March 2020 and builds software for public health and health and human services departments.

The Florida Department of Health began using the platform in September 2020 to deliver real-time test results to residents. Over 50% of households in Florida have adopted the mobile application. On December 6, 2022, the Advanced Technology Academic Research Center (ATARC) awarded Healthy Together and the State of Florida's Department of Health with a Digital Experience Award at their 2022 GITEC Emerging Technology Award Ceremony in Washington, D.C. to recognize success of the project. The partnership was also highlighted on the Federal News Network's show Federal Drive.

The platform is also used at universities in Oklahoma.

In November 2022, the United States Department of Veterans Affairs and Healthy Together announced a collaboration to expand access to health records for Veterans. The platform provides 18 million Veterans with access to their health information through their smartphones and mobile devices. In December 2022, the integration was recognized as one of Healthcare IT News' Top 10 stories of 2022.
