= W. R. C. Latson =

American physician and writer

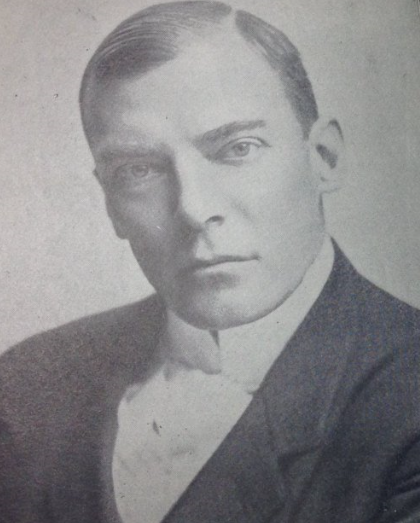
- Born: 1866; New York, U.S.
- Died: May 11, 1911 (aged 44–45); Riverside Drive, U.S.
- Education: Eclectic Medical College of New York City (M.D.)
- Occupations: Physician, writer
- Spouse: Beatrice Cochrane Knountz (div. 1906)

William Richard Cunningham Latson (1866 – May 11, 1911) was an American physician and occultist. He advocated for naturopathy, physical culture and vegetarianism.

== Biography ==
Latson attended the Eclectic Medical College of New York City and obtained his M.D. degree in 1904. Latson was a skin disease specialist who authored works on diet, medicine and hygiene. His book The Attainment of Efficiency, first published in 1910 was concerned with mental health. It went through eight editions.

Latson was a proponent of autointoxication, the belief that disease is the result of the body's inability to evacuate toxic matter. Latson dedicated a book to this subject, Common Disorders with Rational Methods of Treatment in 1904, which described dietary and hygienic methods to eliminate toxins from the body.

He was a member of the Advisory Board for the American Bureau of Personal and Vocational Psychology. Latson was associated with the Health-Culture Company and was editor of their magazine Health Culture. Latson was married to Beatrice Cochrane Knountz, they divorced in 1906.

Latson was interested in physical culture and was considered an expert on self-defense. During the early 20th century, he authored many newspaper articles on boxing, exercise and self-defense. In 1906, Percy Claude Byron was commissioned to take a series of studio photographs depicting "Dr. Latson's Method of Self Defense". They appeared in The Denver Post as illustrations in a June 11, 1911 article titled "When a Thug Attacks You". The photographs were published many years later in the book Once Upon a City: New York 1890 to 1910, in 1958 and in the June, 1972 issue of the American Heritage magazine.

Latson took interest in Hindu occultism and oriental mysticism. He described himself as an "esoteric psychologist". Historian Robert Love commented that Latson in his office at Riverside Drive "presided over elaborate secret rituals — Hindu dancing included — designed to free his female patients from their libidinal restraints."

He was a naturopath and authored articles for The Naturopath and Herald of Health. He is listed in Benedict Lust's Universal Naturopathic Encyclopedia, published in 1918.

== Vegetarianism ==
Latson was a vegetarian. In 1900, he authored Food Value of Meat, Flesh Food Not Essential to Mental or Physical Vigor, which argued that mental and physical health can be attained without the consumption of meat. Latson noted that all the food elements in meat can be obtained from non-flesh products such as cereals, fruits, nuts and vegetables. The book was positively reviewed in the Medical Record for presenting the "physiological and chemical facts relating to the subject in a pleasing, readable manner".

== Death ==
Latson is alleged to have had an affair with Alta Marhevka (real name Ida Rosenthal), his secretary. Marhevka was fascinated by oriental mysticism, occultism and theosophy. She described Latson as her "Man God". Marhevka changed her name and renounced her Jewish faith after studying oriental mysticism with Latson. Latson was found dead with a gunshot to the head, in his apartment at 660 Riverside Drive on May, 11, 1911. Although a suicide note was found, suspicion was pointed to Marhevka the last person to visit his apartment. A few days later she attempted suicide and was arrested. Marhevka believed that Latson had survived physical death and she would meet his soul on the astral plane. She stated that they intended to commit suicide together. An autopsy found that Latson had taken poison before he shot himself.

The coroner's jury returned a verdict that Latson's death was suicide and Marhevka was cleared from all suspicion. After being charged with her own attempted suicide, Markevka denied she made a suicide pact with Latson and that her own attempt was due to an unwell state of mind at the time. In court, she said that her attempted suicide was a "most foolish act" and she wanted to move on with her life and forget the incident.

== Selected publications ==
- Practical Dietetics: Food Value of Meat, Flesh Food Not Essential to Mental or Physical Vigor (1900)
- Common Disorders with Rational Methods of Treatment (1904)
- Walking for Exercise and Recreation (1905)
- The Attainment of Efficiency (1910)
- The Enlightened Life & How to Live It (1910)
- A Catechism of Health (1911)
- Secrets of Mental Supremacy (1913)

== Gallery ==
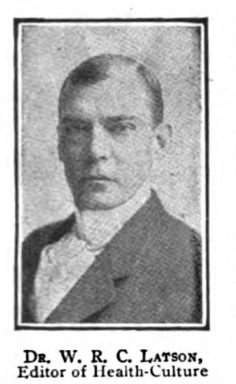
Latson in 1908

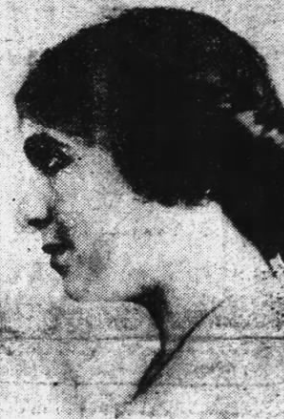
Alta Marhevka, Latson's secretary in 1911

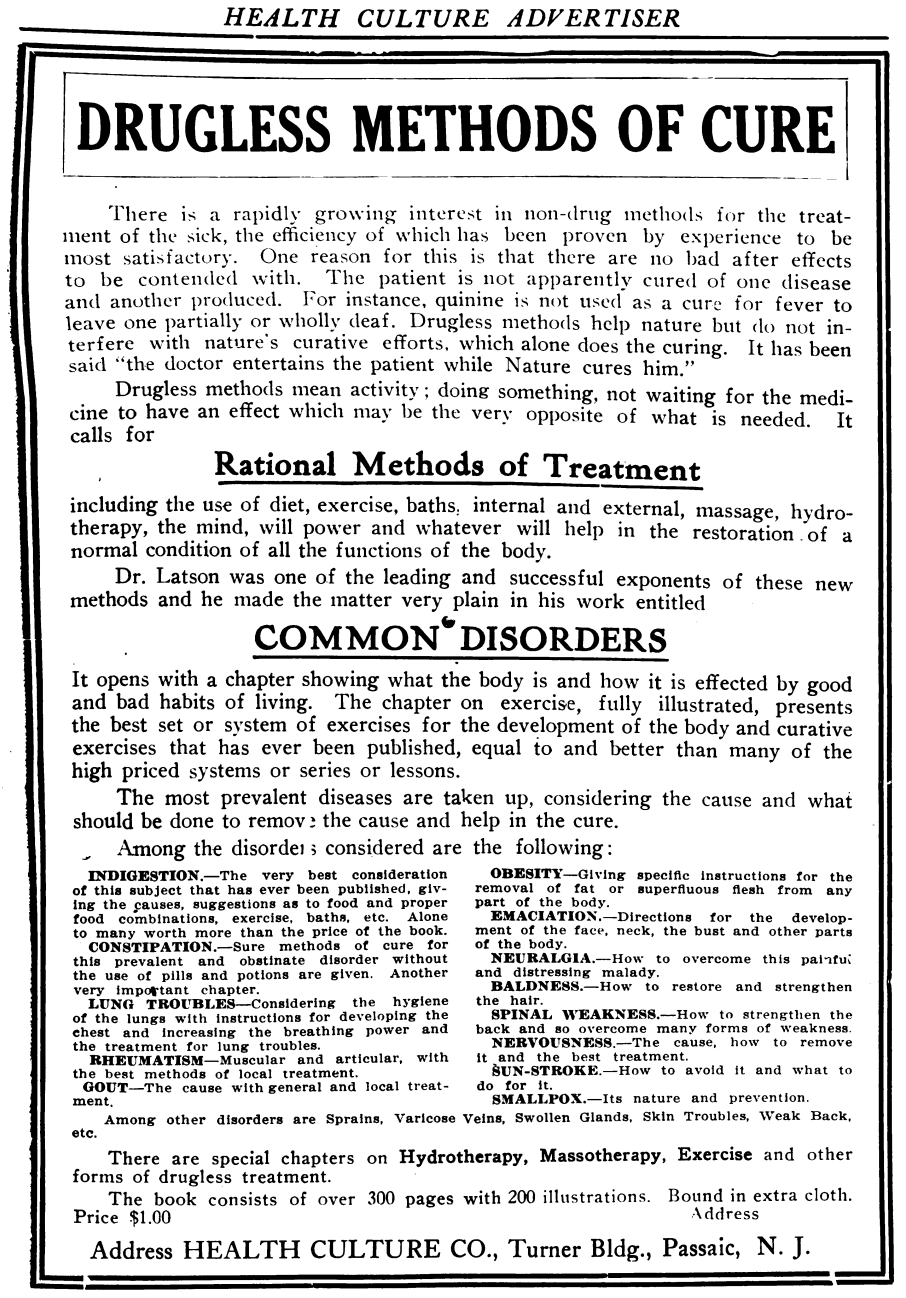
Drugless Methods of Cure advert, 1913

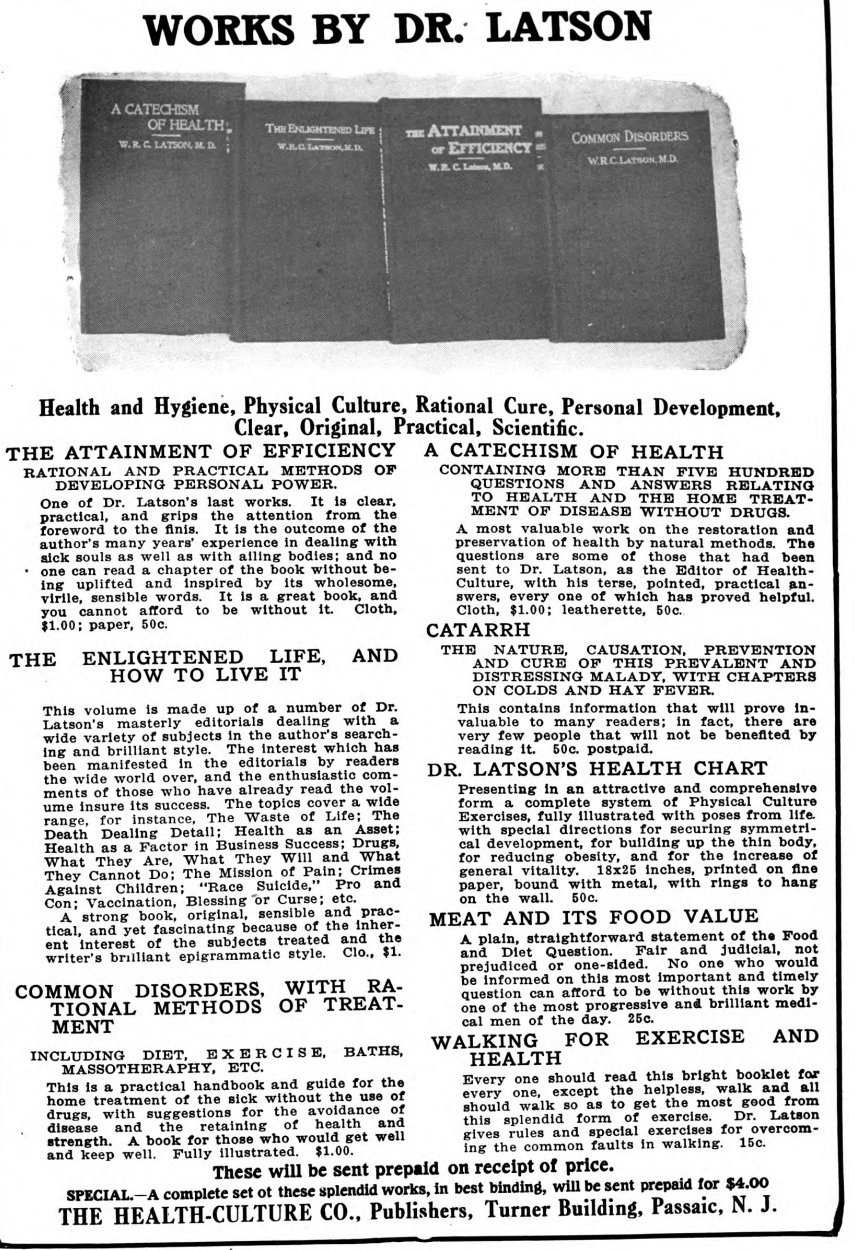
Works by Dr. Latson, 1913
