= Killing of Patrick Harmon =

2017 killing of a Black man by Salt Lake City Police

- Date: August 13, 2017
- Time: Approx. 10.05pm-10:20pm
- Location: 1002 S. State Street, Salt Lake City, Utah, United States
- Filmed by: Police body cameras
- Participants: Officer Clinton Fox, Officer Kris Smith
- Deaths: Patrick Harmon

Patrick Harmon was a 50-year-old African-American man fatally shot from behind by police officer Clinton Fox in Salt Lake City, Utah, on August 13, 2017. The shooting took place after Harmon was pulled over by an officer for riding a bicycle without proper lighting. The incident led to protests in Salt Lake City, some organized by Black Lives Matter.

== Incident ==
Harmon had been pulled over by police officer Kris Smith for bicycling without a red rear light. Officers tried to arrest Harmon after discovering an outstanding warrant. Harmon attempted to flee the scene and was chased by the police, at which point officers said he turned towards them with a knife and was shot. The shooting of Harmon by Fox was recorded by police body cameras. Police also stated that Harmon verbally threatened them prior to the shooting saying "I’ll cut you".

Harmon was tasered by Smith while or when on the ground after being shot by Fox. Harmon was transported to the hospital where he was pronounced dead.

== Aftermath ==
The police and district attorney's office initially declined to release the body camera footage, prompting public protest in Salt Lake City.

In early October 2017, some of the body camera footage was released, and the district attorney in Salt Lake City announced the decision not to file charges against the officers. The district attorney claimed that Harmon posed a threat to the officers. Critics have argued that the video footage from the scene does not show such a threat because he was running away when he was shot. A local Black Lives Matter representative said that the community wanted the district attorney to resign, or else they would respond with protesting marches.

Salt Lake City police Sgt. Brandon Shearer claimed that the officers had used police de-escalation tactics. Fox was criticized by a Black Lives Matter representative, for failing to de-escalate the situation.

In October 2017, following further public protests, the district attorney asked the FBI to review his decision not to prosecute the police involved.

== See also ==
- Biking while black
- List of killings by law enforcement officers in the United States
