= Shooting of Linden Cameron =

Police shooting of an unarmed 13-year old in Salt Lake City, Utah

- Location of Salt Lake City within Salt Lake County
- Date: September 4, 2020; 6 years ago
- Time: c. 10:39:22 pm (MDT)
- Location: Salt Lake City, Utah, U.S.
- Type: Police shooting, excessive force
- Filmed by: Police body camera
- Participants: Matthew Farillas of the Salt Lake City Police Department (shooter)
- Injuries: Gunshot wounds; critical condition; damage to his intestines, colon, bladder, shoulder, stomach, and ankles
- Charges: None
- Litigation: Lawsuit filed by Cameron's family against the SLCPD and Salt Lake City settled for $3 million

On September 4, 2020, Linden Cameron, an unarmed 13-year-old autistic boy was shot and seriously injured by Matthew Farillas, a police officer in Salt Lake City, Utah. Cameron was shot at eleven times, being hit six times by Farillas after Cameron ran from his house during a meltdown. In 2022, the family and the city agreed to settle their civil case for $3 million.

In 2023, District Attorney Sim Gill announced that Farillas would not be charged.

== Shooting ==
On the night of September 4, Linden Cameron's mother, Golda Barton called Linden and told him she was staying at work late with a male coworker, in which Linden threatened to "shoot his ass".

Concerned, Golda made a 911 call asking for a crisis intervention team because Cameron was having a meltdown, and said that she feared Cameron could become violent. Barton said on body camera footage from the incident released by authorities, "I need him to go to a hospital. I cannot get him there on my own and I cannot do this every night." Golda said Linden got into a chase with police while driving someone's truck. She also said he threw a fake gun out the truck during the chase. Barton said law enforcement were a trigger for Cameron. Cameron's grandfather, Owen Barton, had been killed in a confrontation with Lyon County sheriff's deputies earlier in the year. Golda Barton said in the body camera video, "He sees the badge and he automatically thinks like, you're going to kill him, or he has to defend himself in some way. He freaks out. And he's got a sensory disorder."

Two officers stayed near the home of Linden Cameron and Golda Barton, while an officer in the driveway spotted Cameron running. Officers gave chase to Cameron, and broke through the fence which he jumped over. An officer, identified in 2022 as Matthew Farillas, yelled, "Get on the ground!" moments before firing eleven shots at Linden Cameron, six of which hit him. While on the ground, Cameron said, "I don't feel good. Tell my mom I love her." According to Barton, one officer said to Farillas, "He's just a child, what are you doing?"

Salt Lake City Police Sergeant Keith Horrocks and the Salt Lake City Police Department initially defended the shooter, claiming that officers were called to the address for a "violent psych issue" involving a juvenile having a "mental episode" and "making threats to some folks with a weapon." The SLCPD retracted these statements, later concluding that there was no indication or evidence to suggest that Cameron had a weapon.

== Reactions ==
After the shooting, Barton told KUTV, "I said, 'He's unarmed, he doesn't have anything, he just gets mad and he starts yelling and screaming,' He's a kid, he's trying to get attention, he doesn't know how to regulate. They're supposed to come out and be able to de-escalate a situation using the most minimal force possible... He's a small child. Why didn't you just tackle him? He's a baby. He has mental issues." Barton set up a fundraiser on GoFundMe for Cameron's medical expenses, which has raised $105,844 as of September 27, 2020. Linden Cameron's 17-year old brother, Wesley Barton said of the shooting, "It's horrible. To see your little brother bleeding out, saying his last words. It plays in my head over and over."

Salt Lake City mayor Erin Mendenhall said of the incident, "As a member of this community and as the mother of a 14-year old boy, I am profoundly heartbroken and I am frustrated. This shooting is another tragedy. It's a tragedy for this young boy, for his mother, and for families and individuals who have acute mental health needs. I think the community will look at this situation and they will see themselves or their loved ones reflected in it." Salt Lake City police chief Mike Brown stated, "A 13-year old boy was shot and as a father of three sons, this has had an impact on me personally. I know that this has made an impression on the women and men of the Salt Lake City Police Department and of course you, the community we serve. I believe in the face of tragedy, we have a responsibility to analyze the circumstances that unfolded through a lens of learning."

Some accused the SLCPD of engaging in a cover-up due to the department initially falsely stating that Cameron had a weapon, when it was later concluded he was unarmed. Neurodiverse Utah said of the incident in a statement that "Police were called because help was needed but instead more harm was done when officers from the SLPD expected a 13-year-old experiencing a mental health episode to act calmer and collected than adult trained officers".

On September 20, 2022, Salt Lake City reached a settlement of $3 million in a lawsuit for use of excessive force filed by Cameron's family.

On August 11, 2023, Salt Lake County District Attorney Sim Gill announced that Officer Matthew Farillas would not be charged. Golda Barton responded, "He [Sim Gill] seemed like he was doing more of the defense attorney's work than the prosecutor's, so... it just doesn't make sense." As of August 2023, Farillas was still employed by the Salt Lake City Police Department.
