= Military police =

Police organization part of the military of a state

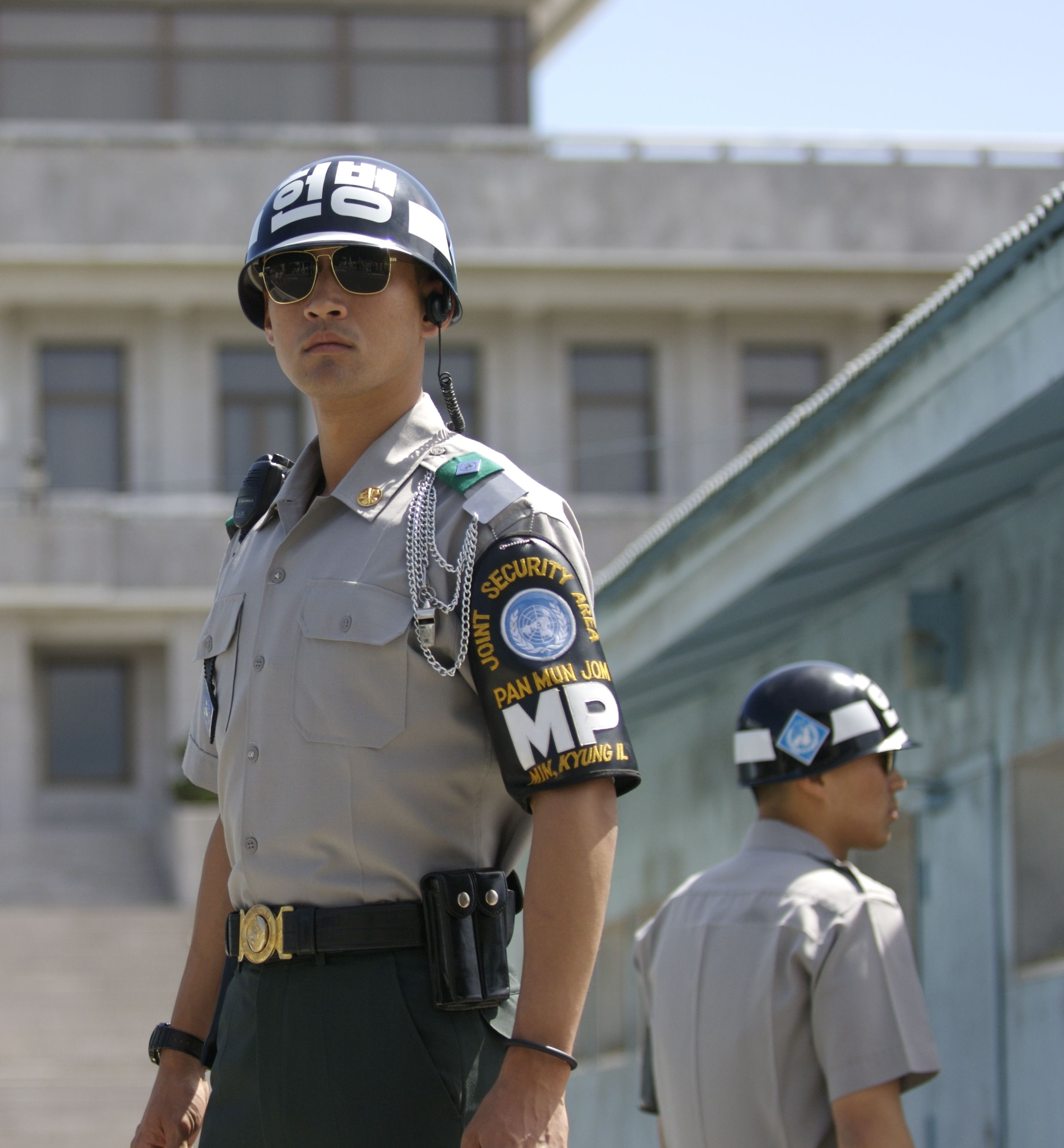
South Korean Military Police at the Joint Security Area in 2007.

Military police (MP) are law enforcement agencies connected with, or part of, the military of a state that usually is assigned to enforce military law. In wartime operations, the military police may support the main fighting force with force protection, convoy security, screening, rear reconnaissance, logistic traffic management, counterinsurgency, and detainee handling.

In different countries it may refer to:

- A section of military forces assigned to police, or garrison, occupied territories, usually during a war.
- A section of military forces assigned to policing prisoners of war detentions.
- A section of the military responsible for policing the areas of responsibility of the armed forces (referred to as provosts) against all criminal activity by military or civilian personnel
- A section of the military responsible for policing in both the armed forces and in the civilian population (most gendarmeries, such as the French Gendarmerie, the Italian Carabinieri or the Spanish Guardia Civil)
- A section of the military solely responsible for policing the civilian population (such as the Turkish Jandarma, Romanian Gendarmerie or the Chilean Carabineros)

The status of military police is usually prominently displayed on the helmet or peaked cap, with an armband, brassard, or arm or shoulder flash. Military police personnel may also wear a more traditional police badge, usually on the front of their uniform. They may also wear other accoutrements exclusive to military police personnel.

Naval police personnel are sometimes called "masters-at-arms" and/or "shore patrol". Law enforcement personnel of an air force are sometimes called "air police", "security police" or "security forces".

== Military police by country ==
=== Americas ===
==== Brazil ====
"Military police" is a law enforcement agency which follows the Brazilian military rules, responsible for preventative policing of the civilian population. Each state has its own Military Police department, and each one is a Gendarmerie. However, despite their name, these corps are not branches of the Brazilian armed forces — instead, they are auxiliary forces and Brazilian army reserves, alongside also the Military Fire Brigades.

Traditional Provost duties are held by different corps within each branch of the Brazilian Armed Forces: Army Police (Polícia do Exército, PE) for the Army, police units in the Marine Corps for the Navy, and Air Force Police (Polícia da Aeronáutica, PA) for the Air Force.

==== Canada ====
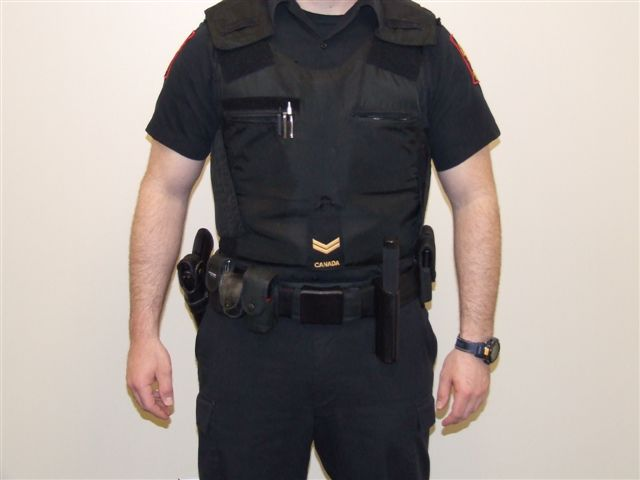
Canadian Forces Military Police Domestic Operational Patrol Uniform

The Canadian Forces Military Police (CF MP) contribute to the effectiveness and readiness of the Canadian Forces (CF) and the Department of National Defence (DND) through the provision of professional police, security and operational support services worldwide.

CFMP are classified as peace officers in the Criminal Code, which gives them the same powers as civilian law enforcement personnel to enforce acts of Parliament on or in relation to DND property or assets. They have the power to arrest anyone who is subject to the Code of Service Discipline (CSD), regardless of position or rank, under the National Defence Act. MPs have the power to arrest and charge non-CSD-bound civilians only in cases where a crime is committed on or in relation to DND property or assets, or at the request of the minister of public safety, commissioner of the Correctional Service of Canada or commissioner of the Royal Canadian Mounted Police. Although MP jurisdiction is only on DND property, any civilian accessing these areas falls under MP jurisdiction and is dealt with in the same manner as by any civilian policing agency. If MPs deem that a person, military or civilian, has committed a crime on or in relation to DND property or assets, they have the power to arrest and charge that person under the Criminal Code. The purpose of the CFMP is not to replace a civilian police officer, but rather to support the Canadian Forces through security and policing services. MPs also have the power to enforce the provincial highway traffic acts on all military bases in Canada pursuant to the Government Property Traffic Regulations (GPTR).

==== Colombia ====
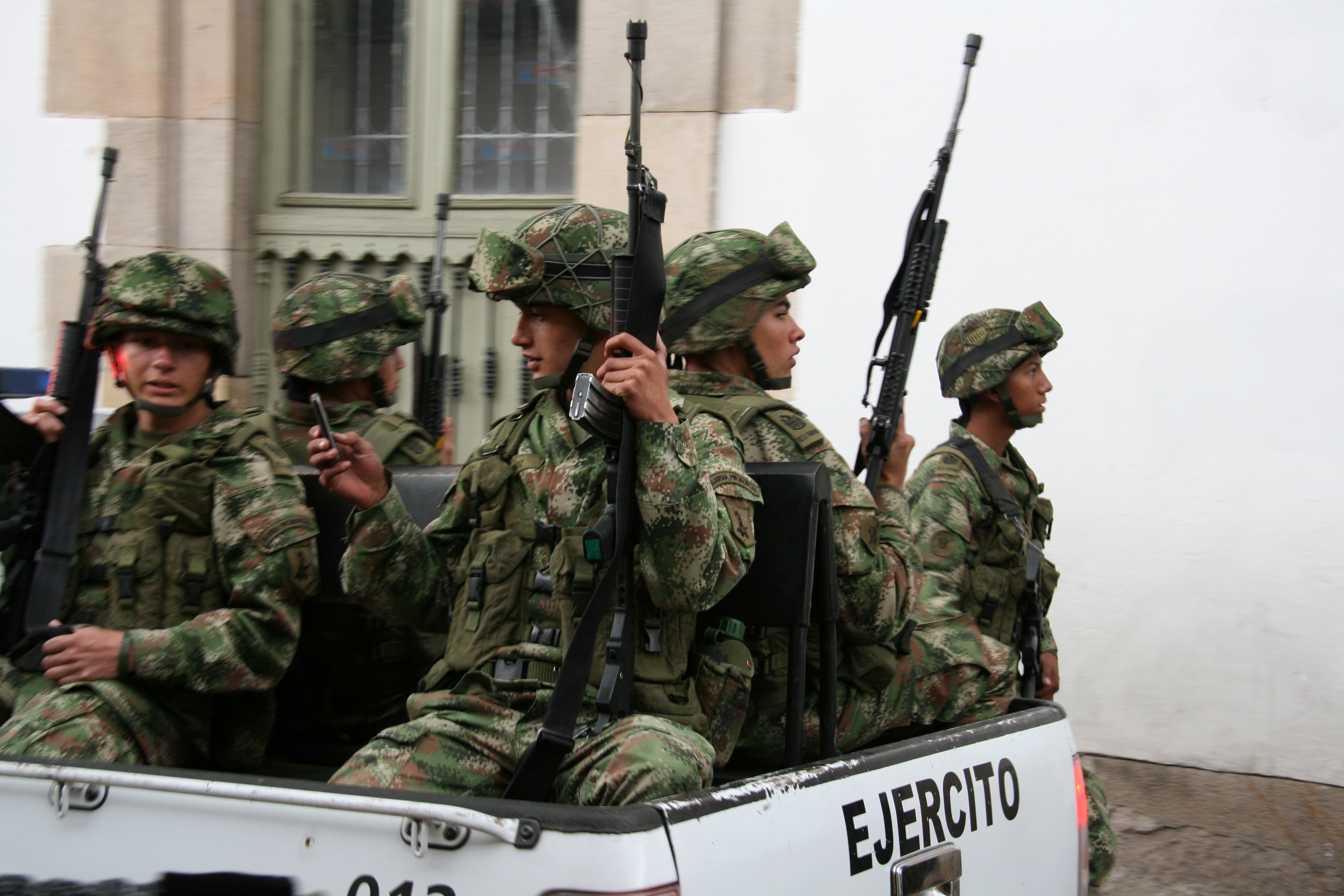
Military Police of Colombia during a practice event in Zipaquirá, Cundinamarca.

In Colombia, MPs (Policía Militar in Spanish) are very common. They can be seen guarding closed roads, museums, embassies, government buildings and airports. In the National Army of Colombia they are assigned to the 37 Military Police Battalions, wearing green uniforms with the military police helmet. A Naval Police battalion is in service in the Colombian Marine Infantry. MP units also provide military bands and drum and bugle corps for ceremonial events. The Air Force also has a military police force (Policía Militar Aérea) that is in charge of protecting and enforcing law inside Colombian Air Force bases.

==== United States ====
Each branch of the United States Armed Forces (except the US Space Force) maintains its own police force. The U.S. Coast Guard, which in itself is a law enforcement agency, uses a mixture of enlisted rates and ranks qualified as law enforcement officers to patrol, investigate crimes, and enforce laws and regulations on large bases and training centers through the United States Coast Guard Police. The Coast Guard also uses the Coast Guard Investigative Service (CGIS), a mixture of civilian, enlisted, reservists, and officers who are qualified and duly sworn federal law enforcement officers separate from the normal Coast Guard chain of command. CGIS primarily investigates and charges those in its own population with serious crimes, such as rape, assault or forgery, that fall under the Uniform Code of Military Justice (UCMJ).

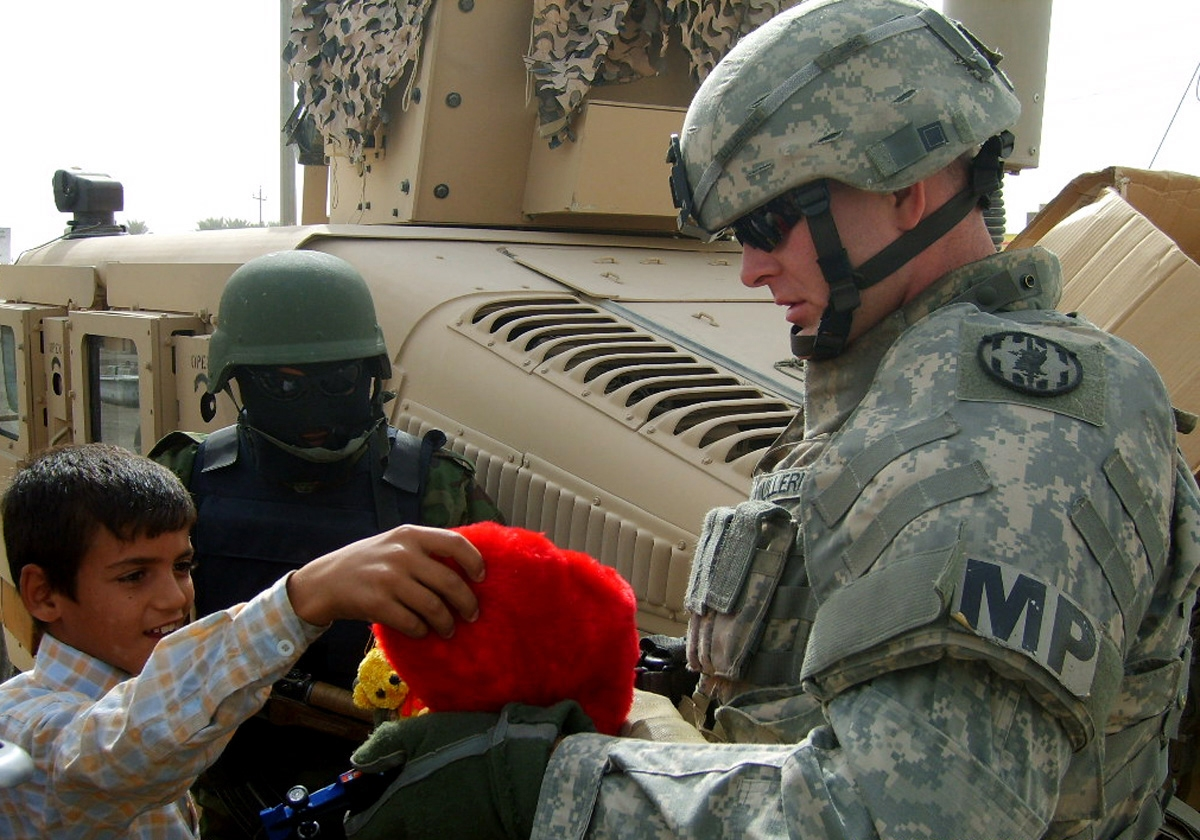
Military Police soldier with an MP brassard bearing the shoulder sleeve insignia of the 89th MP Brigade

The following is a list of military police forces:

- Military Police Corps/Office of the Provost Marshal General—United States Army
- Provost Marshal Office (base law enforcement) and law enforcement battalions (combat support or "field MPs")—United States Marine Corps
- Masters-at-Arms (MAs) are enlisted sailors of the U.S. Navy, designated as Naval Security Force (NSF), primarily responsible for law enforcement and force protection. NSF personnel are led by naval commissioned officers from the limited duty officer (LDO) and chief warrant officer (CWO) communities, who are also designated as NSF. Additionally, a host installation's security force (both overseas and in the continental United States) are augmented by sailors on temporary assignment of duty (TEMADD) from their parent units, as part of the Auxiliary Security Force (ASF). Shore patrol personnel are sailors from U.S. naval vessels visiting foreign ports (and some domestic ports) assigned to the shore patrol party or beach guard, responsible for the good order and discipline of sailors from the visiting ship(s) on liberty. Sailors assigned to the shore patrol party or beach guard detachment do not include sailors assigned to the ship's security force, both performing different duties while visiting that country, because of the status of force agreement (SOFA) or rules of engagement (ROE). Prior to the 1970s, master-at-arms and shore patrol were used synonymously to refer to sailors assigned to perform law enforcement and shore patrol duties.
- United States Air Force Security Forces (formerly known as Military Police, Air Police and Security Police)—United States Air Force and United States Space Force

=== Africa ===
==== Algeria ====
The Algerian People's National Armed Forces has maintained military police units since its founding upon Algerian independence in 1962. The task of the Algerian military police is to maintain law and order within units and hunt down conscripts trying to flee military service, protect and secure military installations, and organize and move large combat units. In the 1990s, three military police battalions were established as combat units, and they have taken part in combat operations.

==== Botswana ====
The Botswana Defence Force maintains provosts to enforce order within the ranks who are authorized to carry out arrests and to order other service personnel to arrest someone. Soldiers and officers suspected of committing offenses may be arrested by military personnel of superior rank. An officer may be arrested by another officer of superior rank, while soldiers may be arrested by any officer, warrant officer, or non-commissioned officer.

==== Arab Republic of Egypt ====
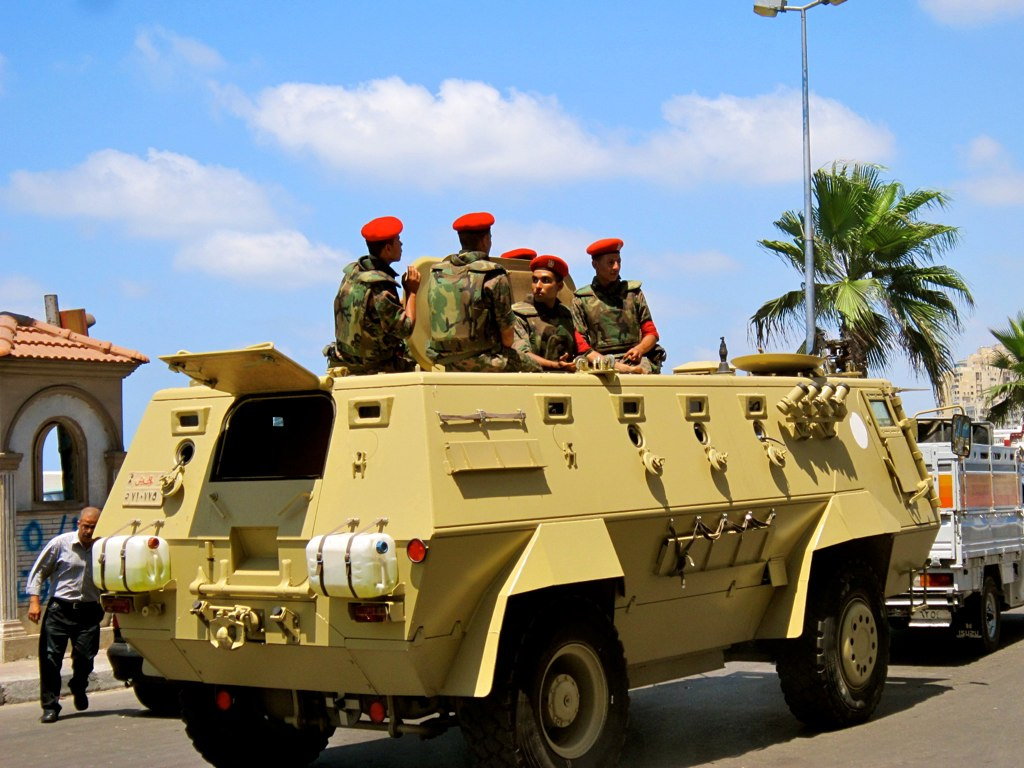
Egyptian Military Police

The Egyptian Army maintains a Military Police Corps consisting of 24 battalions, divided into 12 Inland MP battalions (222nd, 224th, 226th, 228th, 230th, 232nd, 234th, 236th, 238th, 240th, 242nd, 244th) and 12 Field MP battalions (221st, 223rd, 225th, 227th, 229th, 231st, 233rd, 235th, 237th, 239th, 241st, 243rd).

==== Kenya ====
The Kenya Army maintains a Military Police Corps which consists of two battalions and the School of Military Police.

==== Morocco ====
The Royal Moroccan Gendarmerie, a part of the Royal Moroccan Army, is directly subordinate to the Ministry of Interior. It is divided into 22 Regional Gendarmeries, a Mobile Gendarmerie, Air Gendarmerie, and Maritime Gendarmerie.

==== Nigeria ====
The Nigerian Army maintains a military police force, the Nigerian Army Corps of Military Police (NACMP). It is responsible for protecting installations, guarding important personnel as well as military convoys and prisoners, and investigating crimes. Nigerian military police personnel are divided into three fields, and all MPs are required to specialize in at least one: criminal investigations, general policing duties, and K9 handling.

=== Asia ===
==== Armenia ====
The Military Police (Armenian: Ռազմական ոստիկանություն; Rrazmakan vostikanut’yun) of Armenia fall under the command of the Ministry of Defence. The Military Police was established in May 1992, by order of the Minister of Defense. The Military Police is considered a division that is separate from the Ministry of Defense. It had no special status until 2007, when a law to define the Military Police status was adopted. Its status is defined in the RA Law on Military Police. According to the law, the Military Police is responsible for the following:

- Investigation of military crimes in the armed forces that were committed on the territory of military units or by conscripts in military service;
- Deterrence, prevention and stoppage of crimes being planned or committed by military servicemen;
- Protection of property that belongs to the authorized body;
- Proper exploitation and safe operation of vehicles that belong to the armed forces.

The Military Police Bylaws were approved by the Government of Armenia on 25 December 2008.

==== Kingdom of Cambodia ====
The Gendarmerie, or "Military Police", known as the Royal Gendarmerie of Cambodia is a paramilitary unit with about 7,000 soldiers deployed in all provinces. It is headquartered in Phnom Penh. The unit's chain of command is through the Royal Cambodian Armed Forces High Command.

The Royal Gendarmerie of Cambodia is deployed in every province and cities to keep the law and order. Military police in Cambodia play an important role in Cambodia society, keeping law and order in cities along with the National Police.

==== China ====
The 1954 PRC Constitution stipulates that the President of the People's Republic of China unifies the national armed forces, and the 1982 PRC Constitution stipulates that the Central Military Commission leads the national armed forces, in addition to the CPC's insistence on the absolute leadership of the Party over the military, so the Chinese People's Liberation Army does not have a military police in the traditional sense. The armed forces, including the various military branches of the PLA and the Chinese People's Armed Police, have their own police pickets units. According to the "Chinese People's Liberation Army Police Regulations", Article 7 stipulates that the "military affairs department of the commanding authority shall be responsible for the management of police operations in the region" in units above the regimental level, and shall dispatch and lead the police pickets to perform police duties in accordance with Article 27. Article 4 of the Police Regulation provides that:

The main tasks of policing are
(1) Maintaining military discipline.
(2) Maintaining order in the operation of military vehicles and traffic safety.
(3) To investigate and deal with impersonation of military personnel, military vehicles and military units in accordance with the prescribed authority
(4) To safeguard the image of the army and the legitimate rights and interests of soldiers out in the field
(5) To carry out temporary guard duty.

It can be seen that the duty of the police picket detachment only involves the military personnel, military vehicles military discipline and other issues; while the legal sense of criminal law enforcement or public security administrative law enforcement authority, but belongs to the military procuratorate or military defense department. Cases of counterfeit military personnel, counterfeit military vehicles and counterfeit military units investigated and dealt with in police picketing are transferred to the jurisdiction of local judicial organs. Jurisprudence holds that in general criminal cases (i.e. not including crimes against military duties), military status does not constitute a special subject. According to Article 4 of the Regulations on Handling Mutual Involvement of Military and Local Criminal Cases implemented by the Supreme People's Court, the Supreme People's Procuratorate, the Ministry of Public Security, the Ministry of State Security, the Ministry of Justice and the General Political Department of the PLA on August 1, 2009, the principle of personal jurisdiction is adopted for military personnel (including active duty military personnel, civilian cadres, military civilian personnel, non-active duty public service personnel, military employees, retired personnel managed by the military, and The investigation, prosecution, trial, and execution of penalties for military personnel (including active duty military personnel, civilian cadres, military civilian personnel, non-active duty public employees, military employees, retired personnel managed by the military, and reserve personnel and other personnel performing military tasks) are under the jurisdiction and execution of military defense departments, military procuratorates, military courts, military prisons, etc.; the investigation, prosecution, trial, and execution of penalties for local personnel are under the jurisdiction of local judicial organs. Included in the Chinese People's Armed Police Force sequence of public security border defense, public security fire, public security guard forces on active duty, in accordance with local personnel to determine the jurisdiction. Special Case: The military police unit established by the Chinese People's Liberation Army in Hong Kong is the same as the police picket detachment in terms of carrying out its tasks.

In January 2016, the Political and Legal Committee of the Central Military Commission was established as part of the deepening reform of the national defense and military forces. The Bureau of Security of the General Political Department of the Chinese People's Liberation Army was subsequently changed to the Bureau of Security of the Political and Legal Committee of the Central Military Commission, which will assume the functions of investigation, public prosecution and trial of military-related violations with the Military Procuratorate of the Chinese People's Liberation Army and the Military Court of the Chinese People's Liberation Army, respectively.

==== India ====
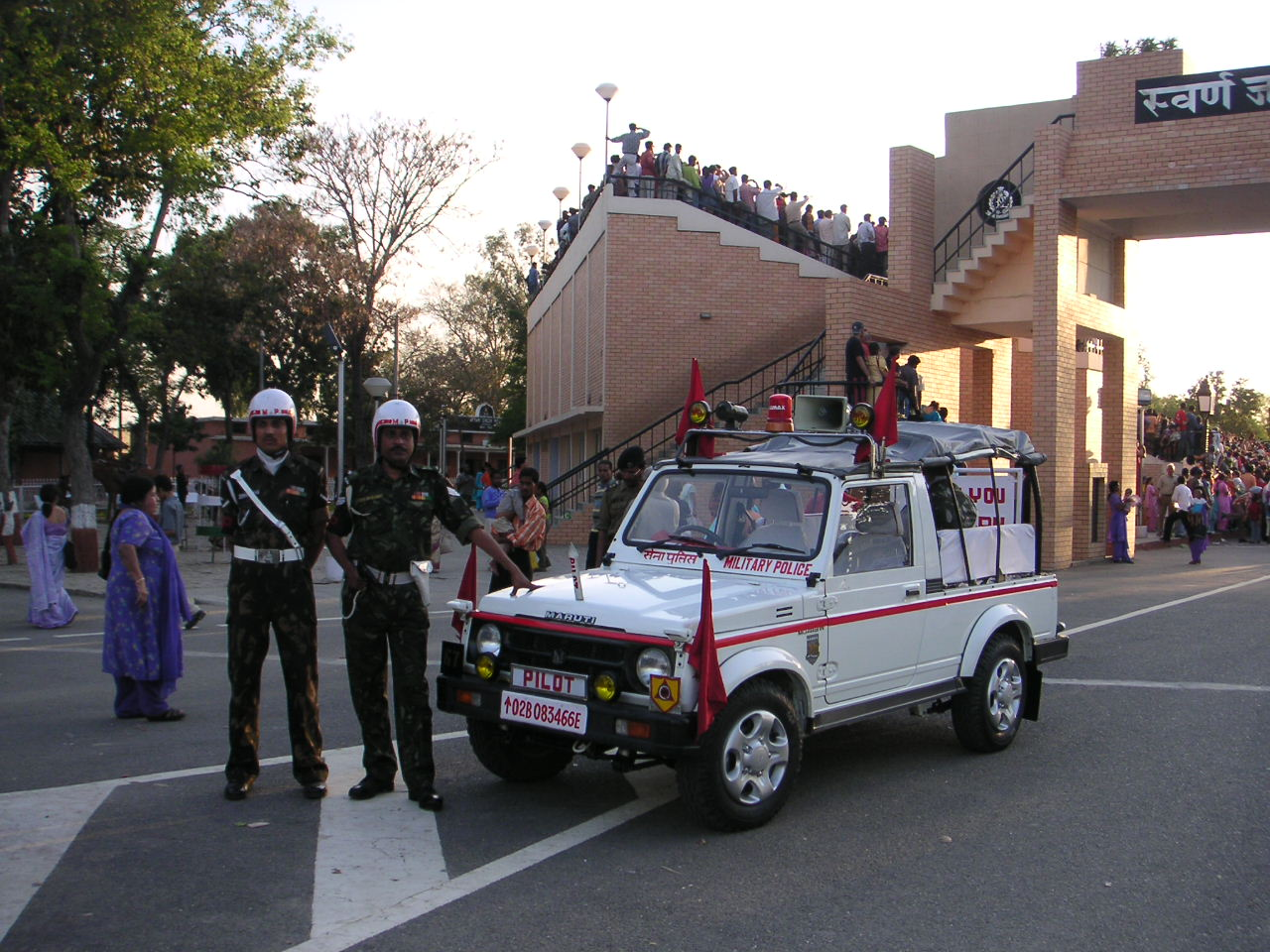
India's Corps of Military Police personnel patrol the Wagah border crossing in the Punjab in a Maruti Gypsy.

The Corps of Military Police (CMP) is the military police of the Indian Army. In addition, the CMP is trained to handle prisoners of war and to regulate traffic, as well as to handle basic telecommunication equipment such as telephone exchanges. They can be identified by their red berets, white lanyards and belts, and they also wear a black brassard with the letters "MP" imprinted in red.

Internal policing duties in a regiment (or a station) are handled by the Regimental Police, who are soldiers of the unit who are assigned to policing tasks for a short period of time. They are essentially used to regulate traffic, and can be identified by a black brassard with the letters "RP" embossed in gold or white.

The Indian Air Force is policed by the Indian Air Force Police. They can be identified by their white peaked caps, white lanyards and belts (with a pistol holster). They used to wear a black brassard with the letters "IAF(P)" imprinted in red, until 2013. Now Indian Air Force Provost and Security officers and IAF(P) wear an arm badge.

The Indian Navy has the Navy Police, and they can be identified by a black brassard with the letters "NP" in gold, with the state emblem placed in between the N and the P.

==== Indonesia ====
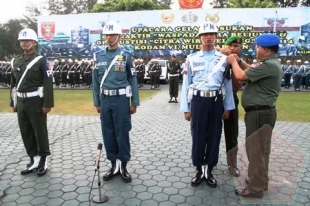
Military policemen of the tri-services (Army, Navy, and Air Force) of the Indonesian National Armed Forces during a ceremony

In Indonesia, the institution which solely has the responsibility and authority concerning the maintenance of discipline and law enforcement towards members of the Indonesian National Armed Forces (TNI) is the Military Police Command (Indonesian: Pusat Polisi Militer TNI abbreviated "Puspom TNI"), an institution directly under the auspices of the Indonesian National Armed Forces Headquarters ("Mabes TNI") which heads the three Military Police corps which are the:

- Indonesian Army Military Police Command; (Puspomad)
- Indonesian Navy Military Police Command; (Puspomal)
- Indonesian Air Force Military Police Command (Puspomau)

They are authorised to enforce military law and conduct crime investigations involving active members of the TNI. Other than conducting law enforcement, MPs which are attached to the Paspampres also conduct escort and Honour guard duties for the head of state, high-ranking military officials, and VIPs. The Military police are also responsible in supervising prisoners of war (POWs), controlling military prisoners, arresting deserters, managing military traffic, issuing military driving licenses and conduct joint law enforcement operations with the civilian police such as implementing traffic checkpoints and crime investigation to take action towards military personnel caught red-handed in violations.

In Indonesia, the Military Police does not have authority towards civilians as it is the realm of the Indonesian National Police (Polri), and in the other hand, the civilian Police does not have authority to arrest active members of the military, except accompanied by the Military police. If a member of the armed forces is caught red-handed by the civilian police, then the violator will be sent to the nearest Military Police or the Military police would be contacted in order to conduct further legal processes.
The Army, Navy, and Air force have their own Military Police unit which focuses on their own branches, but any Military policemen from either branch can take action towards military members from a different branch if caught red-handed, then the violator will be sent to the Military police of their branch. The Military Police in Indonesia are known locally as Polisi Militer sometimes shortened "PM" or "POM".

The uniforms worn by the Military police varies for the tri-services. The Army Military Police wear dark green, the Navy Military Police wear blue-gray and the Air Force Military Police wear light blue. The beret of all of the three Military police corps in Indonesia is the same which is blue, dragged to the left (except those attached to the Paspampres who wears light blue berets). When wearing camouflage uniform, MPs are identifiable by their white aiguillettes and brassard worn on their upper left sleeve imprinted the word "PM".

==== Iran ====
The Central Provost of Islamic Republic of Iran Army is the police service of the Islamic Republic of Iran Armed Forces. It has authority within all branches of the Islamic Republic of Iran Army and has seniority over the designated provosts of the "Sea Police" of the Islamic Republic of Iran Navy and the "Air Police" of the Islamic Republic of Iran Air Force. Separately, the General Provost of the Islamic Revolutionary Guard Corps maintains police authority over the land, air, and sea branches of the Islamic Revolutionary Guard Corps and the Basij militia.

==== Israel ====
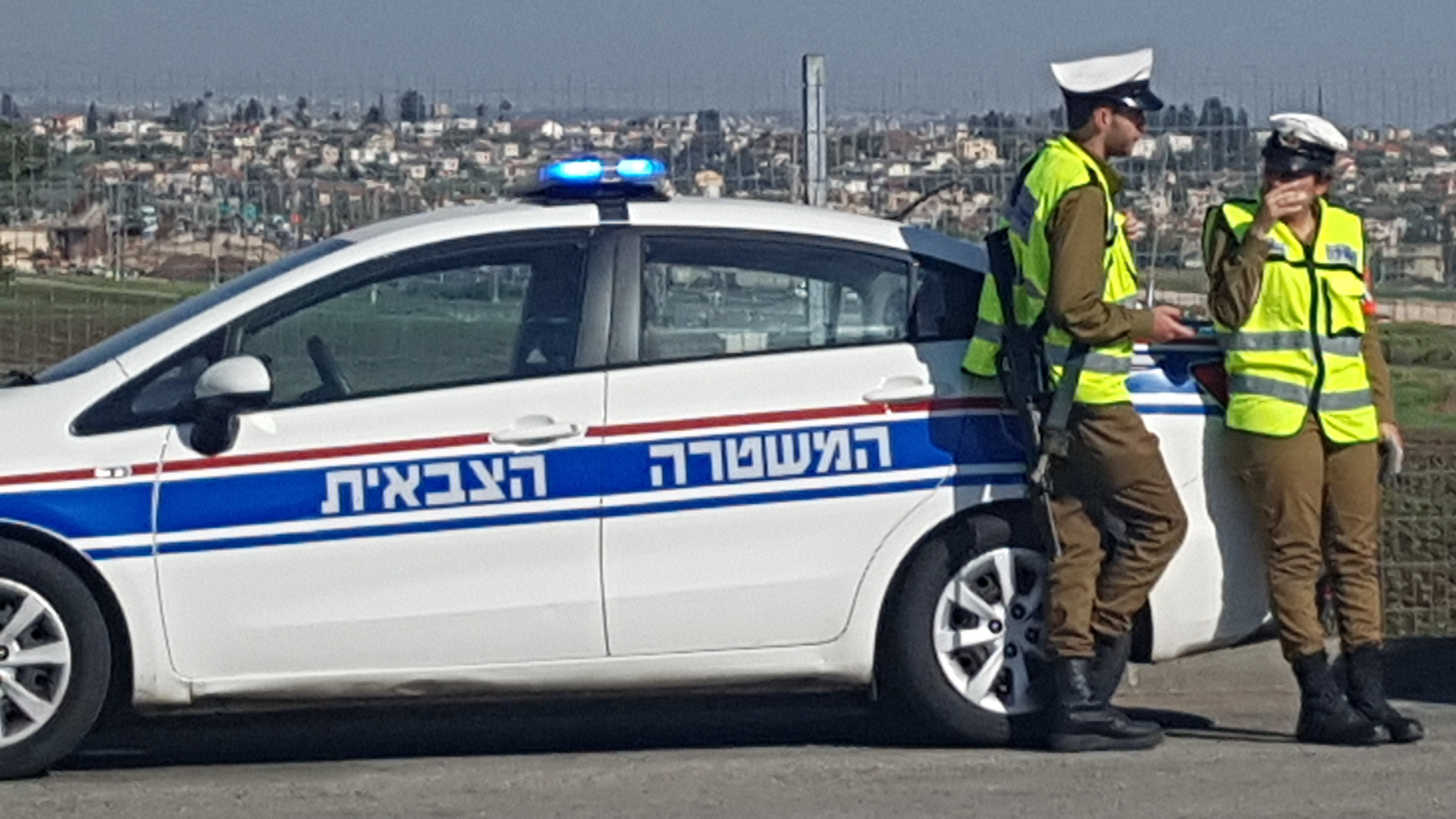
Israeli military police personnel and vehicle

The Military Police Corps (Kheil HaMishtara HaTzva'it), Mem Tzadeh for short, is the military police/provost of the Israel Defense Forces. It is responsible for investigating crimes committed by soldiers, traffic enforcement among military traffic, arresting soldiers suspected of criminal offenses, assisting officers in enforcing discipline, locating deserters, guarding military prisons, and helping man checkpoints. In times of emergency, enemy detainees are held and sorted by the military police. It is a brigade-sized force commanded by a brigadier general.

The corps has very little civilian jurisdiction and for that reason works in conjunction with the Israel Police when civilians are involved. The Israel Border Police, a branch of the civilian police force, is Israel's gendarmerie equivalent.

The civilian police and military police share a computer database. Suspects apprehended by the civilian police on a civilian charge and wearing civilian clothes turning out to be a deserting or AWOL soldier are turned over to the Military Police.

==== Japan ====
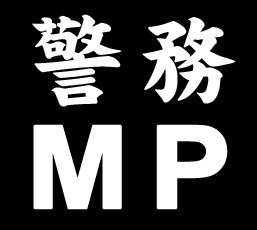
MP armband of the Japan Self-Defense Forces

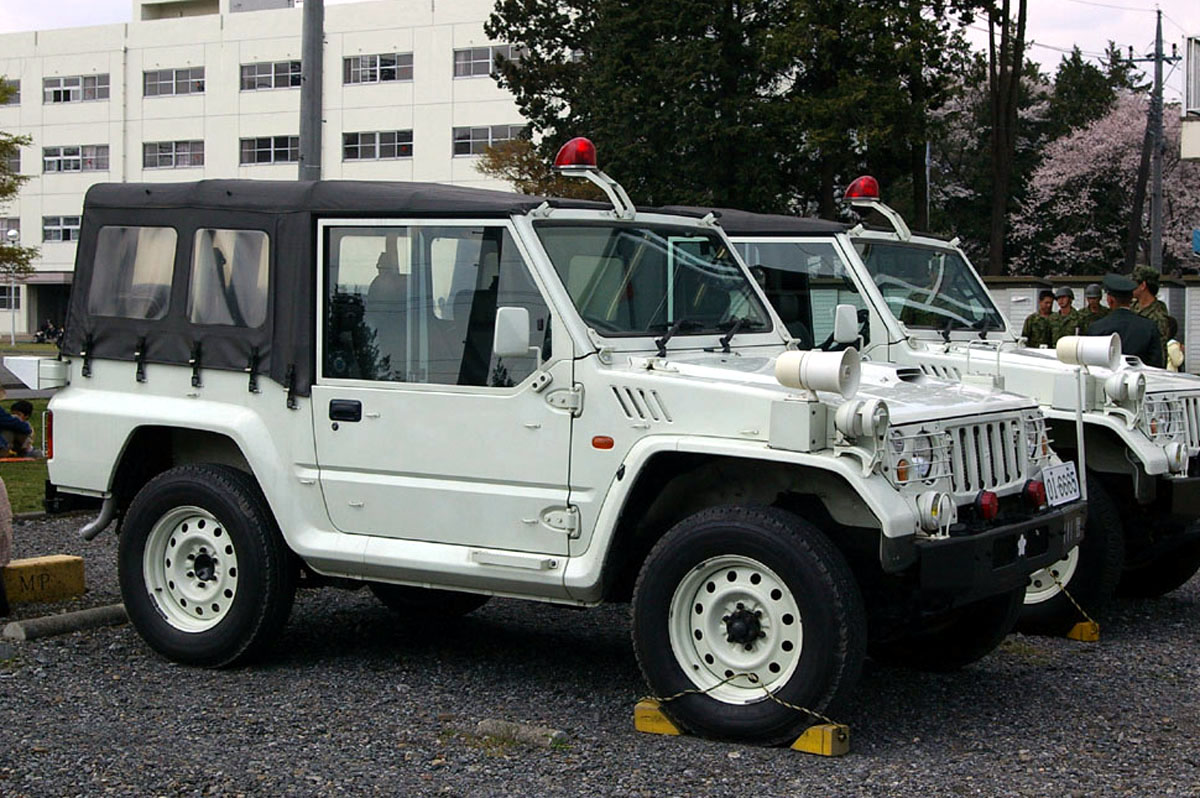
Japan JGSDF MP vehicle

During World War II, the Kempeitai were the military police of the Imperial Japanese Army and the Tokkeitai were the military police of the Imperial Japanese Navy. They also performed intelligence and secret police functions and were active in Japan and its occupied territories.

Today's Japan Self-Defense Forces maintain military police units called the Keimutai (警務隊), with its personnel called Keimukan (警務官). Keimu means police affairs.

==== Kazakhstan ====
The Military Police in Kazakhstan refers to law enforcement bodies in the Armed Forces of the Republic of Kazakhstan. The military police is under the joint jurisdiction of the Ministry of Defense, the Ministry of Internal Affairs and the National Security Committee, all of which manage the activities of the military police.

==== Mongolia ====
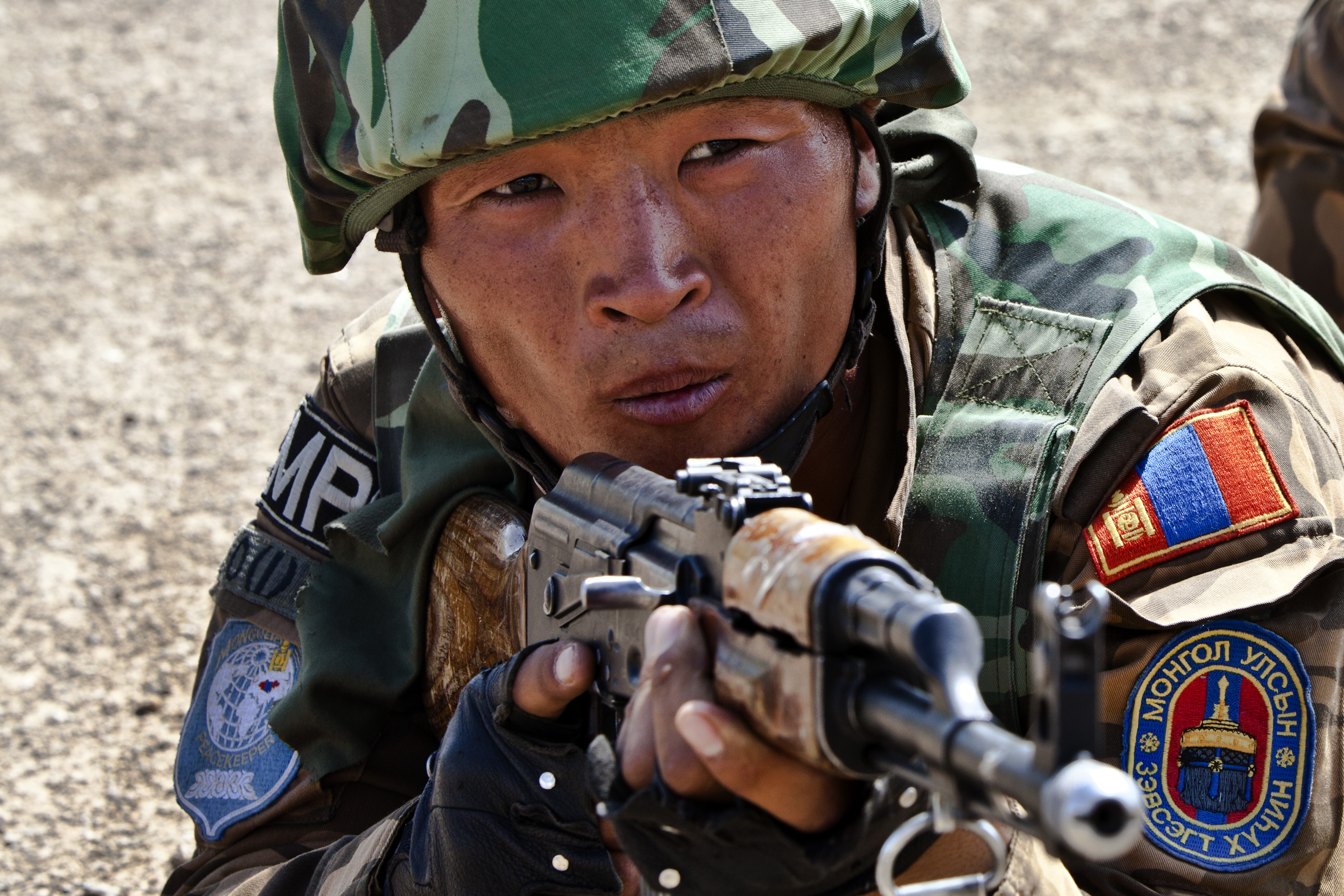
A Mongolian unit 032 operative during an exercise

The Mongolian Armed Forces maintain two law enforcement units. The Internal Troops of Mongolia is a paramilitary gendarmerie unit that performs special guard and reserve duties. Among other duties, it guards government installations and serves as a riot police force. The 032 Military Unit engages in law enforcement as well as organizing daily activities and military supplies and services.

==== Malaysia ====
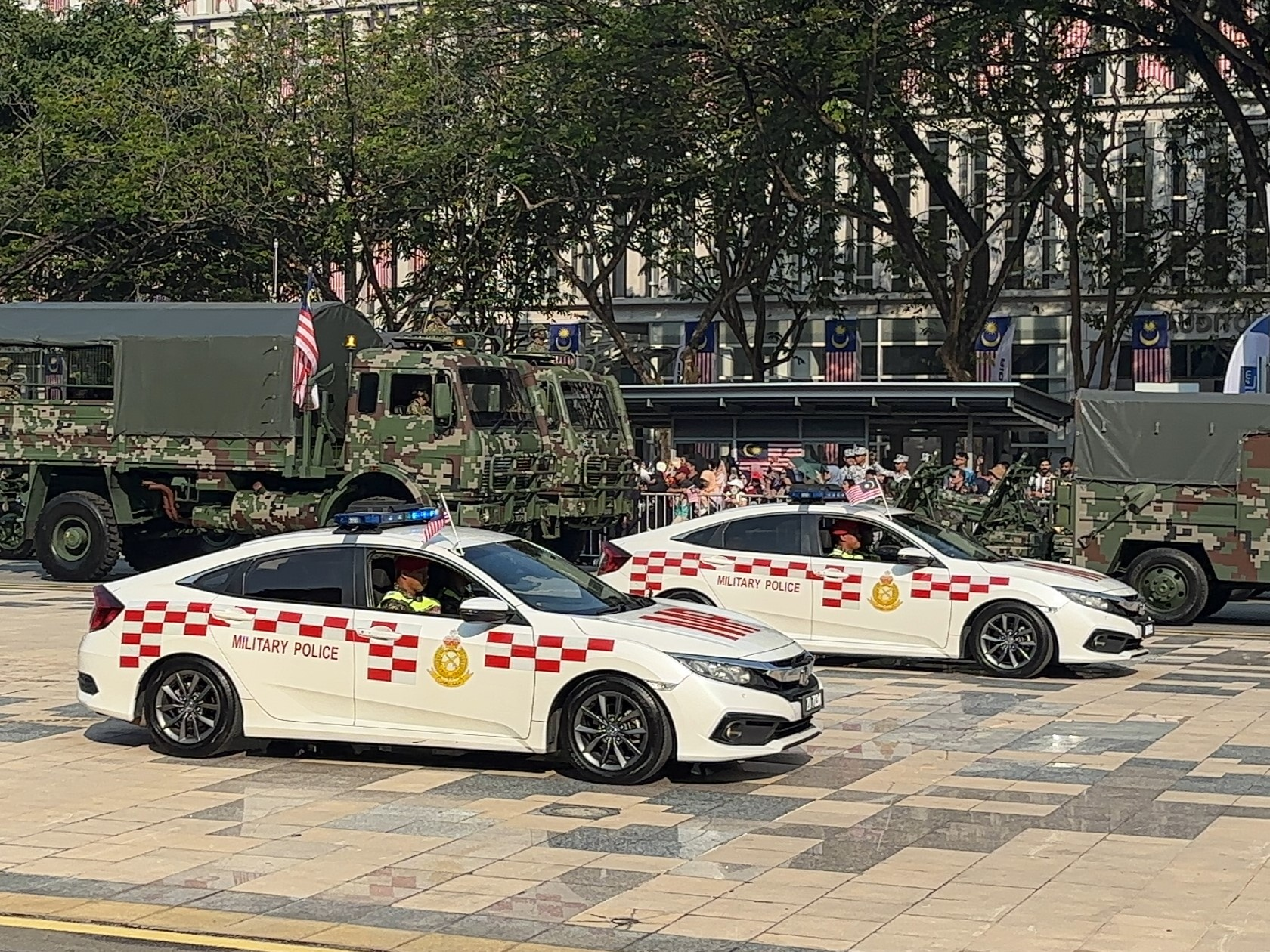
TDM Royal Military Police Corps Honda Civic 1.8S patrol vehicle during the 2024 Independence Day Military Parade in Putrajaya

The Kor Polis Tentera DiRaja (Royal Military Police Corps) performs military police duties in the Malaysian Army. Apart from enforcing discipline and conduct of members of the Army, the Corps oversees security of designated Army installations, performs escort and ceremonial duties, and assists civil law enforcement authorities. The Kor Polis Tentera is also tasked with crime prevention and investigating criminal activities on Army property or by military personnel. With its roots in the British Royal Military Police, members of the Kor Polis Tentera DiRaja also wear the distinctive red peaked cap, white lanyard and belt, as well as a black brassard with the letters "PT" imprinted. PT stands for "Polis Tentera", the Malay words for "Military Police". Military police on traffic duty wear armbands sporting the letters "MP" in red.

==== Pakistan ====
Since the establishment and inception of the Pakistan Armed Forces, they have maintained their own military police. The Pakistan Army received its share of Muslim personnel from the former Royal Indian Military Police, forming the Pakistan Army Military Police or "MP". Later, the Pakistan Navy established the "naval police" with its centre commissioned at "PNS Nighaban", and the Pakistan Air Force later established the PAF Police to maintain order.

The Pakistan Navy's Naval Police can be identified by their red armbands with the letters "NP" written in white. They are headquartered at PNS Qasim in Karachi.

The Pakistan Army's military police is known as the Pakistan Army Corps of Military Police. They can be identified by their red armbands, white cross belts and white combat helmets with the letters "MP", written in white.

The Pakistan Air Force established its own military police, known as the "Pakistan Air Force Police" commonly referred to as Provost. The PAF Police can be identified by their red armlets, white cross belts and white combat helmets with "PAF Police" written in red.

The MP, NP and the PAF Police do not exercise any jurisdiction over civilians, nor can the civil courts interfere in the operations of the Military Police. In some cases, the Military Police Corps have worked with civilian police agencies if civilians are involved.

==== Philippines ====
The Armed Forces of the Philippines currently maintains its own military police distinct from the nation's civilian force, reporting to the Chief of Staff through the service commanding generals.

The American-established (now defunct) Philippine Constabulary (PC) was also known as the Military Police Command. Pursuant to Republic Act 6975 (the DILG Reorganization Act of 1991), the PC and the Integrated National Police merged to form the civilian Philippine National Police, and was placed under the Department of the Interior and Local Government.

==== Saudi Arabia ====
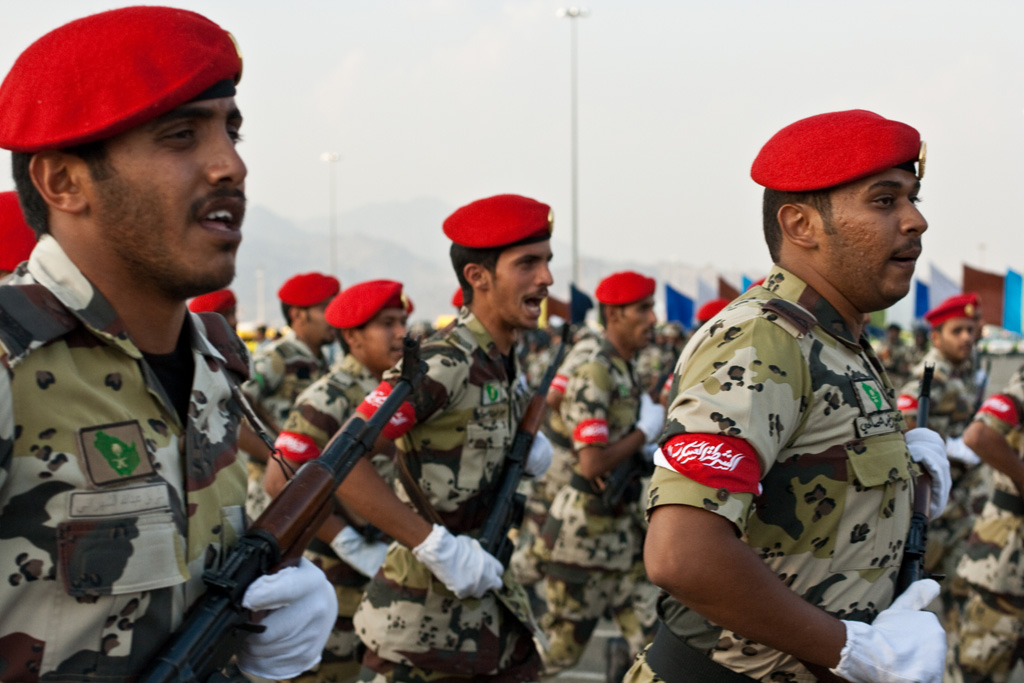
Saudi Special Emergency Force Military Police

Every branch of Armed Forces of Saudi Arabia (Royal Saudi Land Forces, Royal Saudi Air Force, Royal Saudi Naval Forces, Royal Saudi Air Defense Forces and Royal Saudi Strategic Missile Force) have its own Military Police. Saudi Arabian National Guard has its own Military Police. In the Ministry of Interior, the General Directorate of Border Guard, General Directorate of Public Security, General Directorate of Prisons and Facilities Security Forces each has its own military police. In Presidency of State Security, the Saudi Emergency Force and Special Security Forces each has its own military police.

The military police of Directorate of Public Security are a small subset and are charged mainly with keeping peace in areas with high levels of aggression and tension.

All the military police wear red berets.

==== Sri Lanka ====
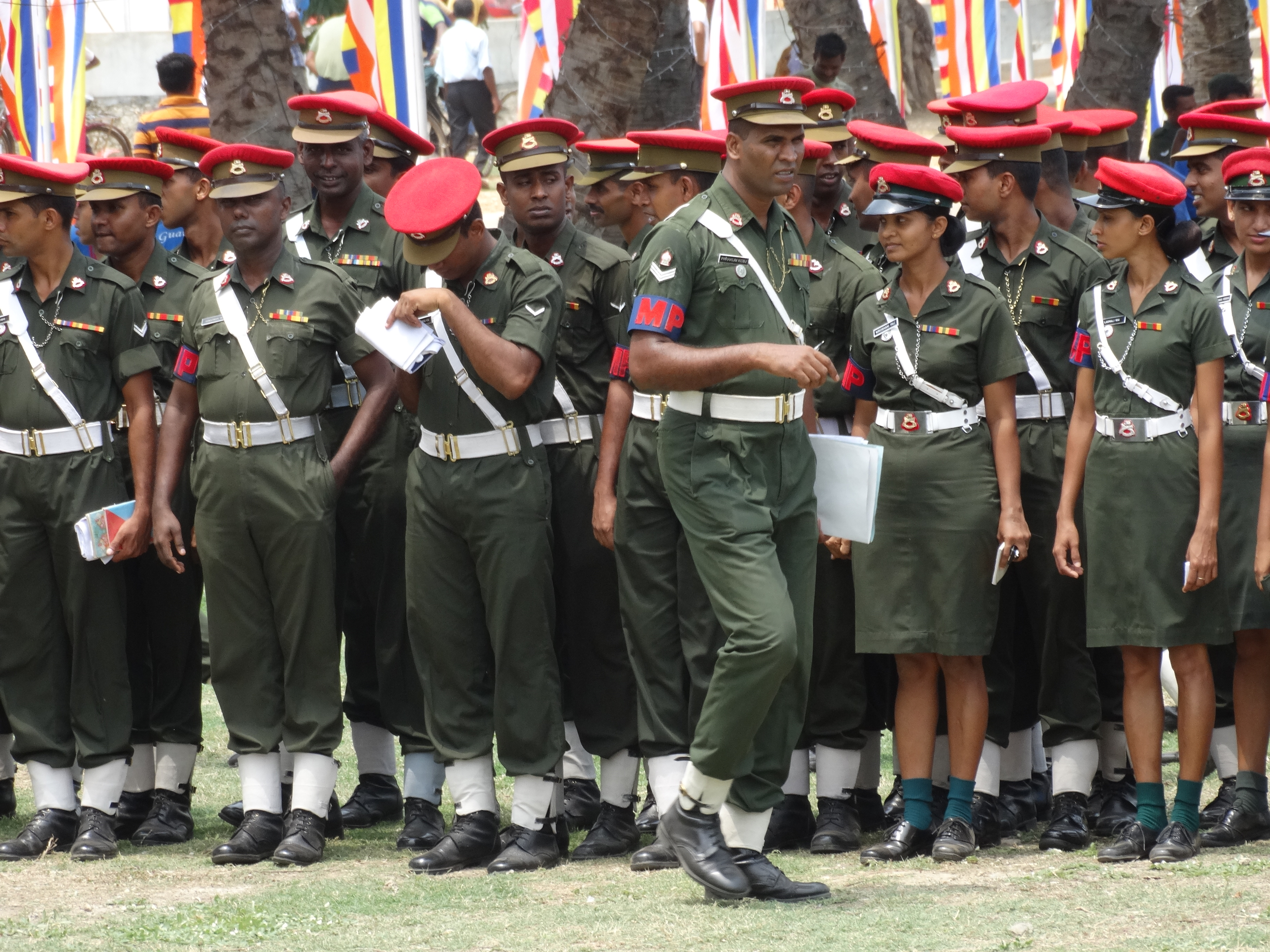
Sri Lanka Military Police for Buddha's Birthday in Jaffna, Sri Lanka 14 May 2014

Each branch of the Sri Lankan Armed Forces has its own military police/Provost section. The Sri Lanka Army is policed by the Sri Lanka Corps of Military Police and by Regimental Police, who belong to each individual regiments or corps.

The Military Police force carries out the following missions:

- Maintenance of order and discipline: Consists of monitoring, maintaining and, if necessary, re-establishing discipline and military order. This also involves controlling stragglers and refugees in times of war and guarding and escorting prisoners of war.
- Security missions: Prevents and deters any threat to or attack against the personnel and property of the armed forces. MPs also provide VIP motorcycle escorts and honor guards, perform close protection missions and escort classified documents and money transports.

The Sri Lanka Navy is policed by the Provost Branch. The Sri Lanka Air Force is policed by the Air Force Police (AFP).

==== Singapore ====
In Singapore, the Singapore Armed Forces Military Police Command serves as the law enforcement agency of the Singapore Armed Forces. The command is headed by a colonel, otherwise also known as the provost marshal. Its sub-units included the Military Police Enforcement Unit (including Special Investigations Branch and ceremonial and drill components), the Detention Barracks (DB), The 1st Provost Bn, MP Training School and the Security Support Forces (including Military working Dog Wing, Close Protection and Security Ops Unit). The command also collaborates closely with the Singapore Police Force in terms of policing work duties, investigations, etc.

==== South Korea ====
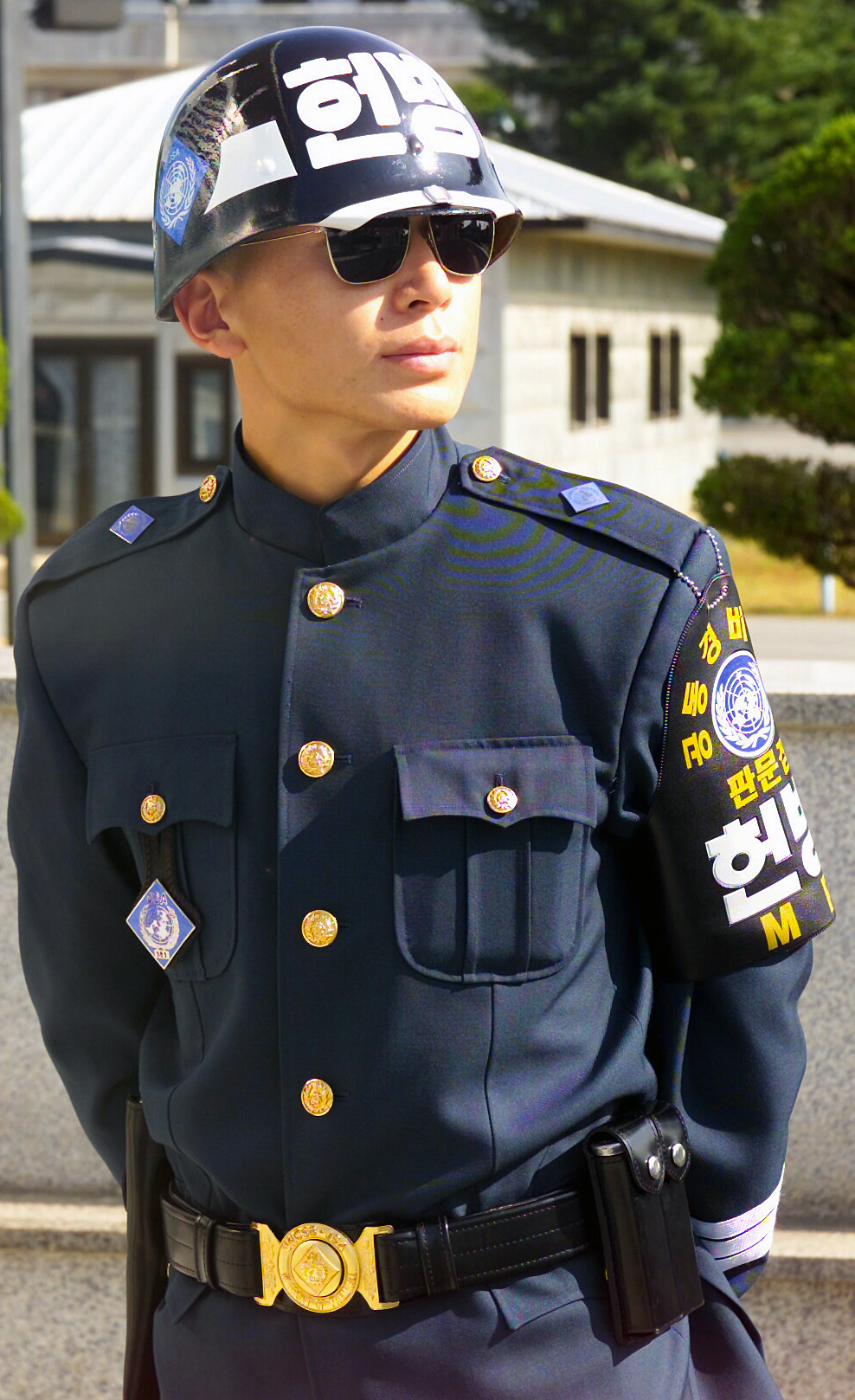
A Republic of Korea (ROK) Military Police (MP) stands guard duty at the Korean Demilitarized Zone (DMZ)

The Republic of Korea Armed Forces maintains a series of separate military police commands for the Army, Navy, Air Force, and Marine Corps. ROK Army MPs also function as border guards at the Korean Demilitarized Zone.

==== Taiwan ====
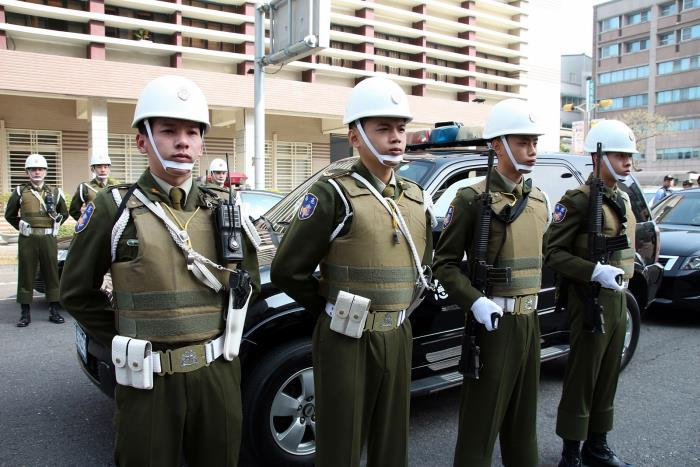
ROC (Taiwan) Military Policemen on duty.

The ROCMP is responsible for enforcing military law, maintaining military discipline, providing backup for the civilian police force or serving as combat troops during times of emergency, providing security for historical sites (such as the Cihu Mausoleum) and certain government buildings, including the Presidential Office Building in Taipei City, as well as performing counter-terrorism and VIP protection operations. The ROCMP are also charged with the defense of the capital Taipei.

==== Thailand ====
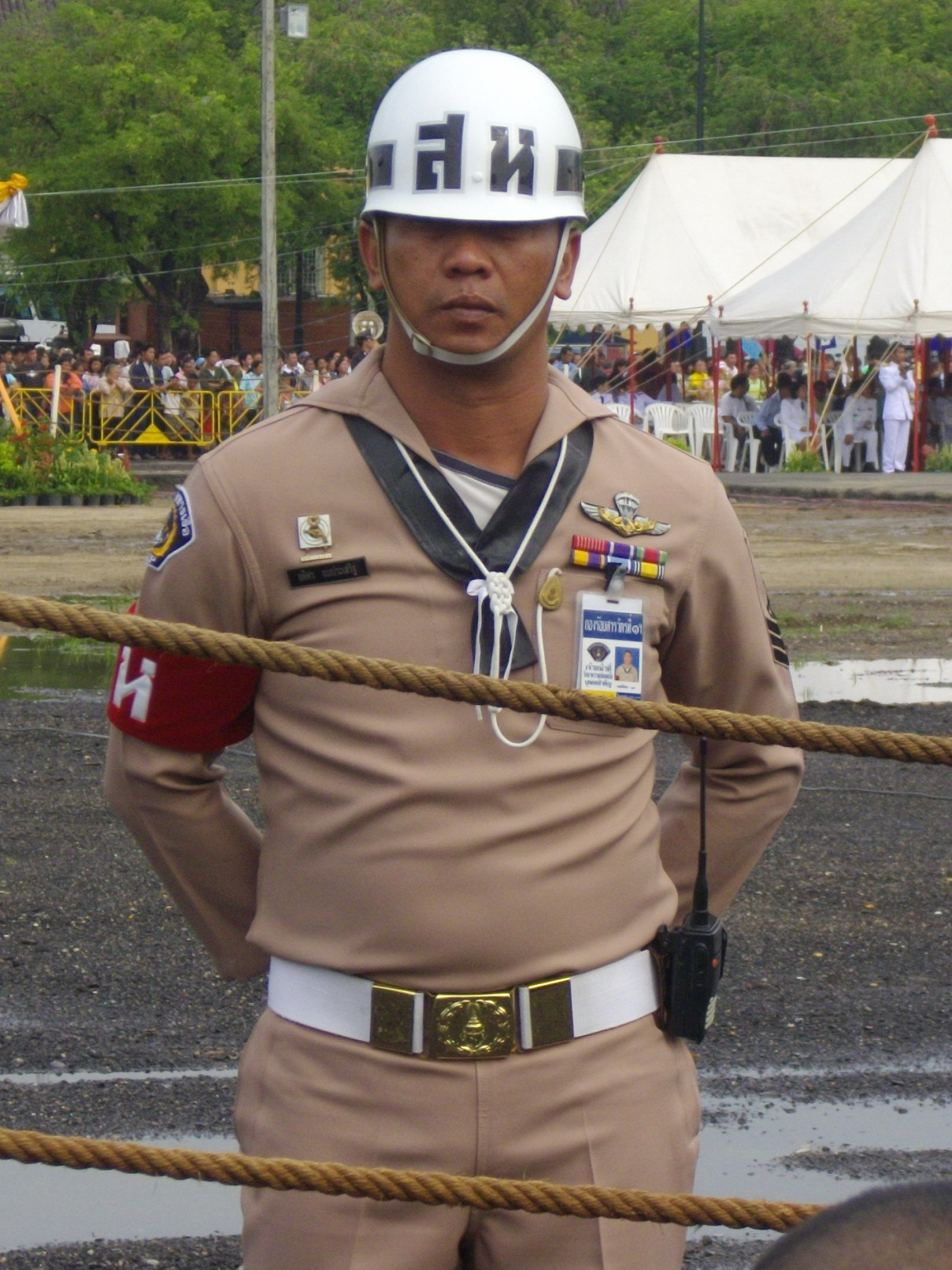
A Royal Thai Navy Military Policeman

In Thailand, each branch of the armed forces has its own military police force. The Royal Thai Navy has the Naval Military Police (สารวัตรทหารเรือ), the Royal Thai Army has the Army Military Police (สารวัตรทหาร), and the Royal Thai Air Force has the Air Force Military Police (สารวัตรทหารอากาศ).

The duties of the Air Military Police Department (กรมทหารสารวัตรทหารอากาศ) are peacekeeping, security, regulating traffic discipline within Air Force installations and housing areas, apprehending deserters, escorting VIPs and investigating crimes under the authority of the Military Court. These investigations include prisoners of war, enemy aliens, refugees and displaced officers within the Air Force and designated areas. It is under supervision of the Commander of the Air Military Police Department.

There is one active Air MP Battalion called the Battalion of Military Air Police (กองพันทหารสารวัตรทหารอากาศ). The Air Military Police Department is one unit under the supervision of the Office of Don Muang RTAF Base Commander (สำนักงานผู้บังคับทหารอากาศดอนเมือง).

- Office of Don Muang RTAF Base Commander (สำนักงานผู้บังคับทหารอากาศดอนเมือง)
- Air Military Police Department(กรมทหารสารวัตรทหารอากาศ)
- Battalion of Military Air Police (กองพันทหารสารวัตรทหารอากาศ)

==== Vietnam ====
In Vietnam, the Military Police Brigade 144 (Vietnamese: Kiểm soát Quân sự (KSQS), lit. 'Military Provost') is under the command of the General Staff of the Vietnam People's Army.

Military Police on duty in Ho Chi Minh city (Saigon), 2025

The military polices are responsible for guarding and protecting the Presidential Palace, government offices and army offices. They are also responsible for supervising military laws on soldiers and officers. Even though the Brigade 144 is the highest level division in the Military Provost force of Vietnam, there seems to be no unified command for the Military Police under the General Staff, the Ministry of National Defense or another General Department within the Ministry. There are several known Military Police units such as the Military Police Battalion 31 of the Ho Chi Minh City Command, the mentioned Brigade 144 of the General Staff, and the Military Police Battalion 103 under the Hanoi Capital Command. Besides the Provost units, there are also the military investigative agencies that function similarly to the Provosts, such as the Criminal Investigation Bureau and the Investigative Security Agency within the Defense Ministry.

=== Europe ===
==== Austria ====
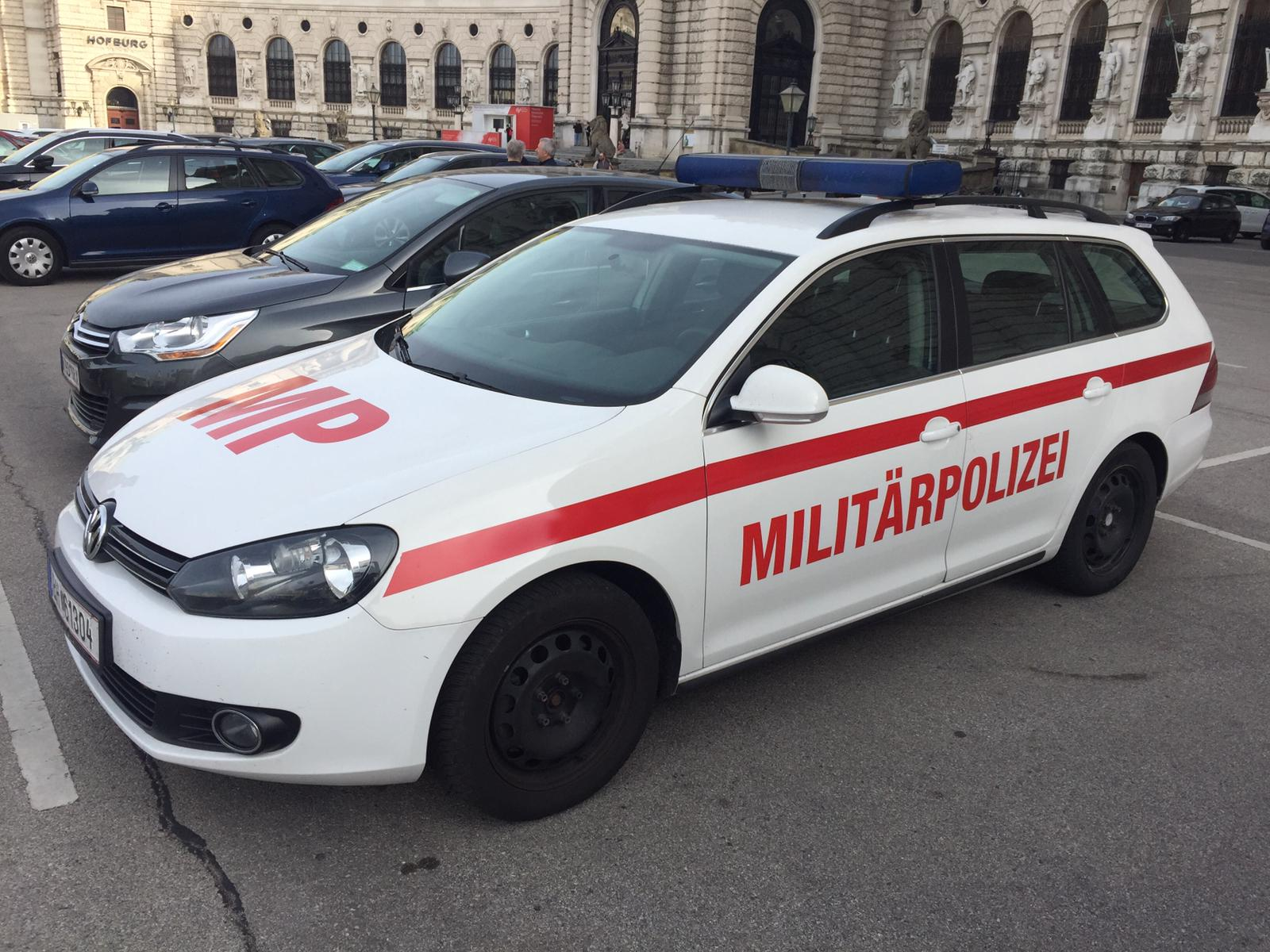
Standard patrol vehicle of the military police

The Austrian Military Police (German: Militärpolizei) of the Austrian Armed Forces (Bundesheer) is located in Vienna and consists of the following elements

- Military Police HQ
- Fundamentals Division
- Training Division
- Signal Platoon
- Close Protection
- 3 MP Companies
- MP Militia

The Military Police has three locations in Austria. The Military Police Command and one MP Co. are located in Vienna. One MP Co. is in Graz and one in Salzburg.

The Military Police is tasked with law enforcement and the protection of the forces, military events and Armed Forces property. The increasing number of international operations in which Austrian soldiers participate and new threat scenarios hugely expand the spectrum of tasks. In addition to its traditional domestic tasks, the Military Police now also fulfill tasks in international operations. In Austria the Military Police is only tasked with internal Armed Forces matters. Abroad, they are tasked with extensive assignments. It closes the security gap between a conflict that has ended and a functioning society. A large number of experienced specialists and modern equipment are required to meet these demanding tasks.

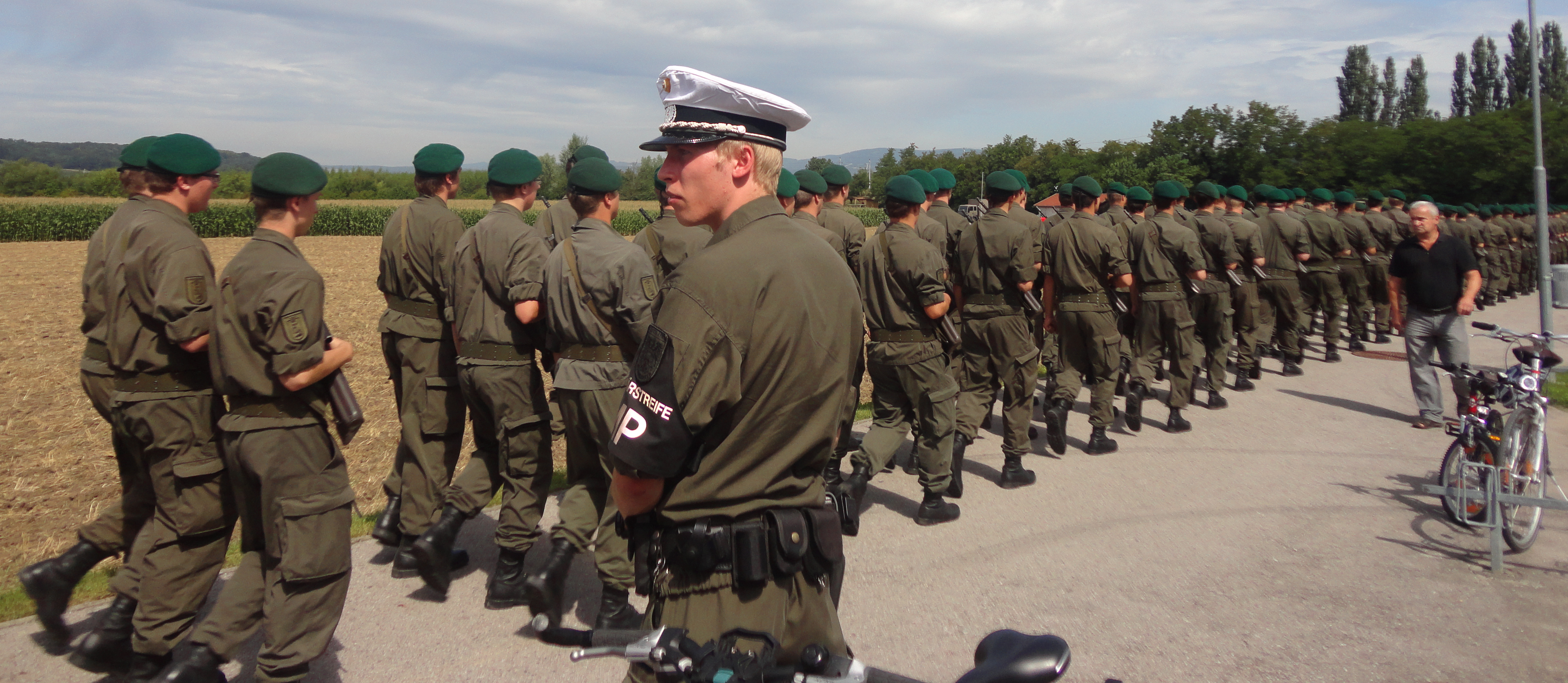
An Austrian MP secures and monitors marching conscript soldiers.

National tasks include:

- Check routines and security checks
- Security duty
- Traffic control
- Close Protection
- Force Protection
- Law enforcement
- Inquiries

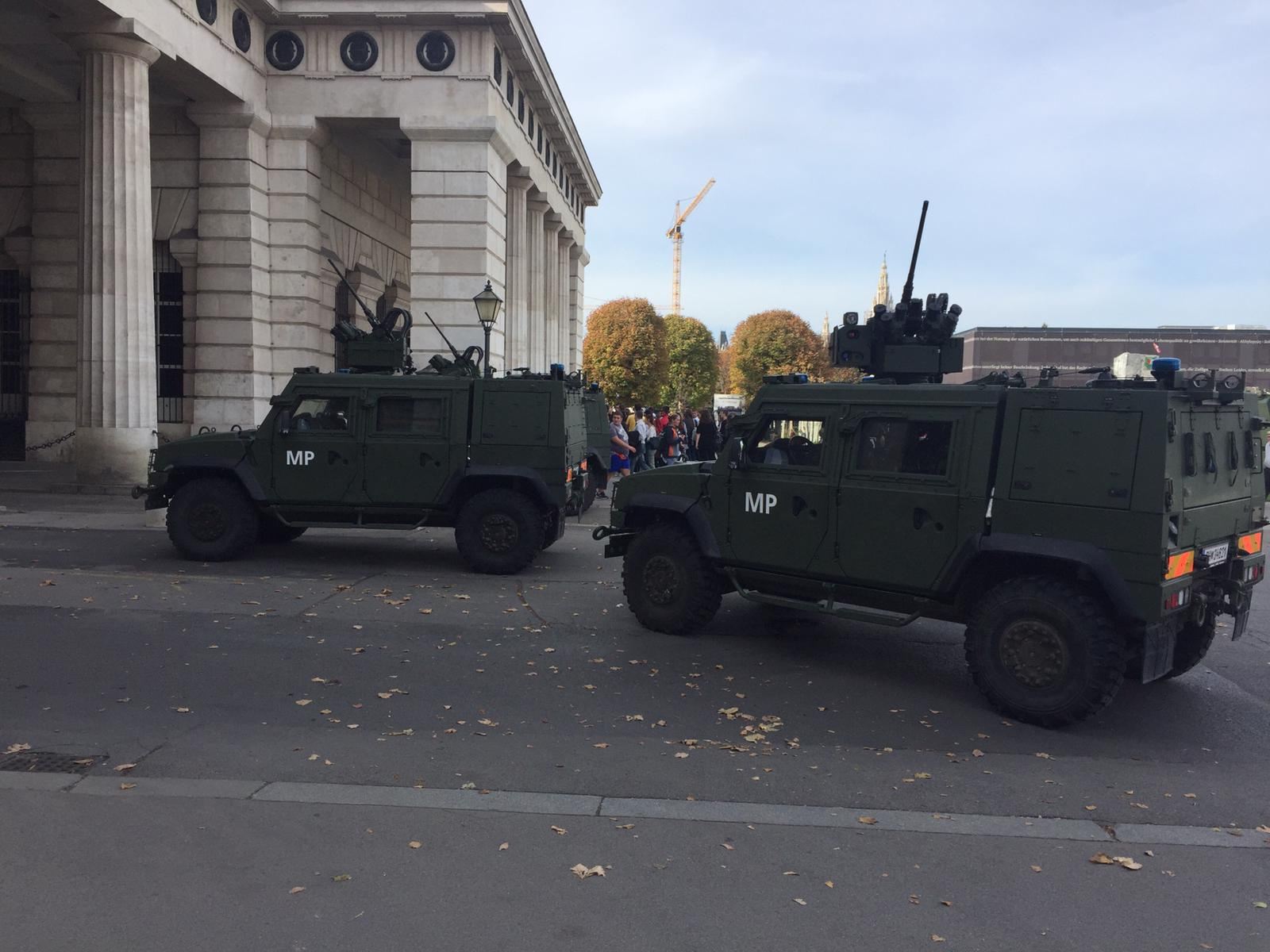
Armoured vehicle of the military police blocking a road in Vienna

International tasks include:

- Taking down traffic accidents
- Crime scene investigation
- Fingerprinting and photographing
- Interrogations
- Searches/investigations/support in interventions
- Detention of dangerous criminals
- Crowd and riot control
- Operation of detention facilities
- Interventions (Special weapons and tactics – SWAT)
- Close Protection
- Defence against terrorism

==== Belarus ====
In Belarus, the functions of military police are carried out by the Military Commandant's Services of the Armed Forces of Belarus. As of 2025, there are 6 regional commandant's services in the Belarusian Armed Forces.

==== Belgium ====
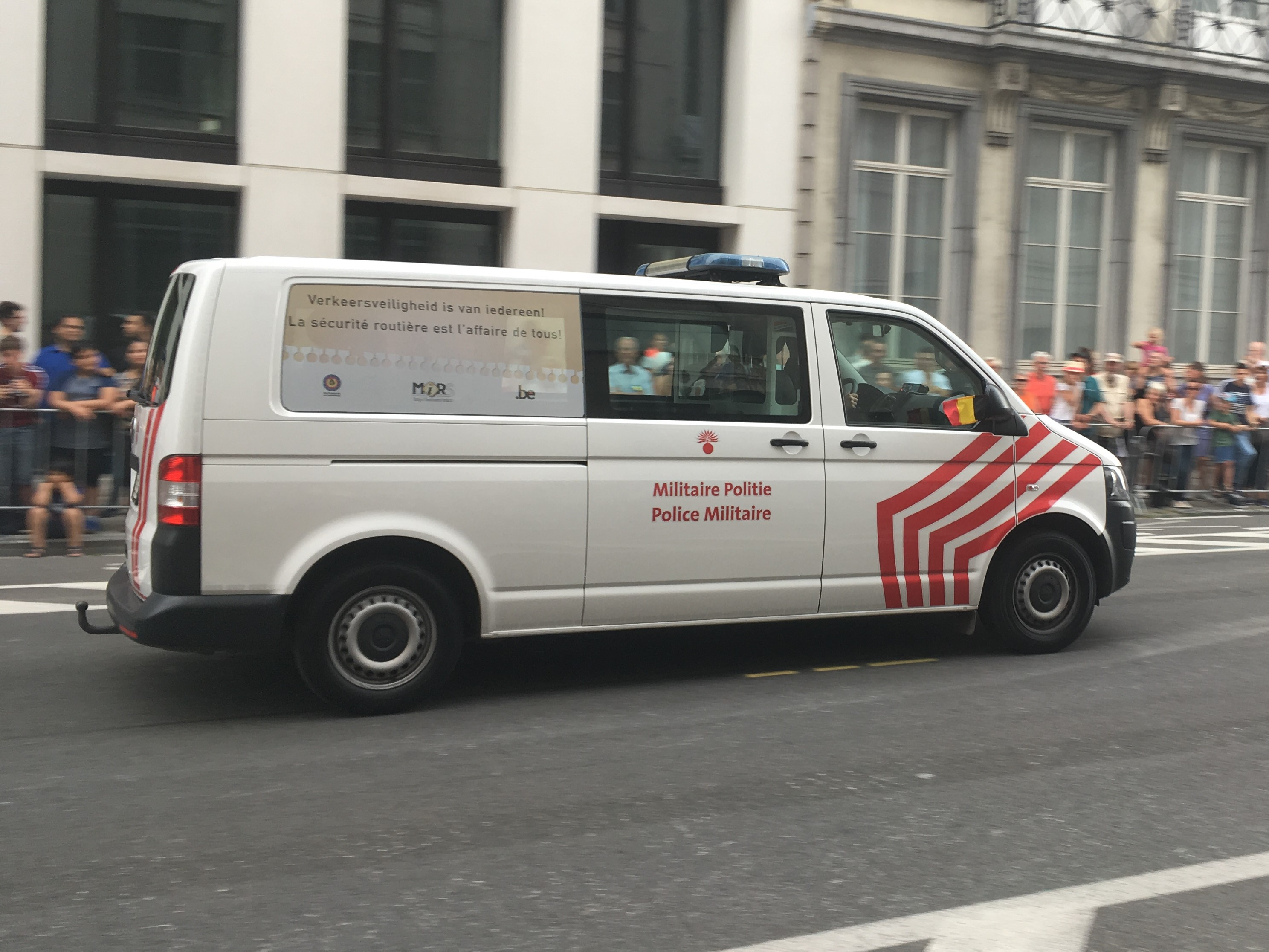
Vehicle of the Belgian Military Police.

The Belgian Army's Military Police Group (Groupe Police Militaire in French; Groep Militaire Politie in Dutch) performs military police duties on behalf of all four components of the Belgian military. The group is headed by a colonel and has 188 members in five MP detachments. Until 1995, the Belgian Rijkswacht/Gendarmerie was, besides its civilian policing tasks, responsible for the nation's Military Police duties.

The Military Police Group staff is located in the Queen Elizabeth Barracks in the Brussels suburb of Evere. Alpha Detachment located at Evere covers the province of Flemish Brabant and the capital, Brussels. Bravo Detachment covers the Walloon Brabant, Hainaut Province and Namur Province areas and is located at Nivelles. Charlie Detachment located at Marche-en-Famenne covers the Liège Province and Belgian Luxembourg areas. Delta Detachment covers the Limbourg and Antwerp Province areas and is located at Leopoldsburg. Echo Detachment located at Lombardsijde covers Western and Eastern Flanders.

The Military Police force carries out the following missions:

- Maintenance of order and discipline: Consists of monitoring, maintaining and, if necessary, re-establishing discipline and military order. This also involves controlling stragglers and refugees in times of war and guarding and escorting prisoners of war.
- Traffic regulation: Includes traffic monitoring and regulation to ensure the flow of military movements in accordance with plans. This includes route reconnaissance and marking, convoy and oversize vehicle escort and river crossing control. Traffic accident investigations is also a part of the job.
- Security missions: Prevents and deters any threat to or attack against the personnel and property of the armed forces. The Military Police force protects, for example, the Palace of the Nation and the Parliaments and Councils of the Regions and the Communities, headquarters and classified conferences. MPs also provide VIP motorcycle escorts and honour guards, perform close protection missions, and escort classified documents and money transports.

The Belgian Military Police has also taken part in multinational peacekeeping missions such as Afghanistan, Kosovo and the Congo. The Federal Police's Military Crime Division (DJMM) performs all investigations involving the armed forces.

In 2003, duties relating to refugees and deserters in wartime were transferred from the then disbanded Gendarmerie to the MPs. Members of the former 4 and 6 MP Companies were merged into the new MP Group, along with some Gendarmes previously assigned MP-related duties.

Belgian MPs are identified by black armbands with the letters MP in white block letters, worn on the left arm.

==== Bosnia and Herzegovina ====
Shortly after the formation of the Armed Forces of Bosnia and Herzegovina in 2005, an intentional strategy was made to limit in law and multi-ethnic, crime violation in the armed forces, so to speak, the Military Police, which was formed later on and approved by the Ministry of Defense of Bosnia and Herzegovina.

==== Bulgaria ====
The first documents reflecting the establishment of interior order bodies in Bulgaria are: Instruction on Establishment of Initial Military Police Governorship, dated 3 July 1877, Instruction on the Rights and Duties of the Constituted Local Police Guards, dated 19 July 1877, and Temporary Regulations on Constituting Police Voluntary Sentries and Armed Guards, dated 8 August 1877.

According to the Instruction on Military Police Governorship in the free Bulgarian lands and regions with army presence, the Military Police enforced the law and order in the rear of the army, suspended possible clashes among members of different religious communities and observed for the proper implementation of commanders instructions.

==== Croatia ====
Croatian Anti-Terrorist Military Police unit during military march.

The Croatian Military Police (Croatian: Vojna policija) is a part of the Croatian Armed Forces (Oružane snage Republike Hrvatske). The Croatian Military Police was formed on 27 August 1991, shortly after the National Guard Corps (Zbor narodne garde) – now the Croatian Army – was formed.

Parts of Croatian Military Police are:

- NSVP – Military Police Education center "Bojnik Alfred Hill"
- 66th Military Police Battalion
- 67th Military Police Battalion
- 68th Military Police Battalion
- 69th Military Police Company
- 70th Military Police Company
- 71st Military Police Battalion
- 72nd Military Police Battalion
- 73rd Military Police Battalion (HRM (Croatian Navy))
- 74th Military Police Company (HRZ (Croatian Air Force))
- 75th Military Police Battalion

==== Czech Republic ====
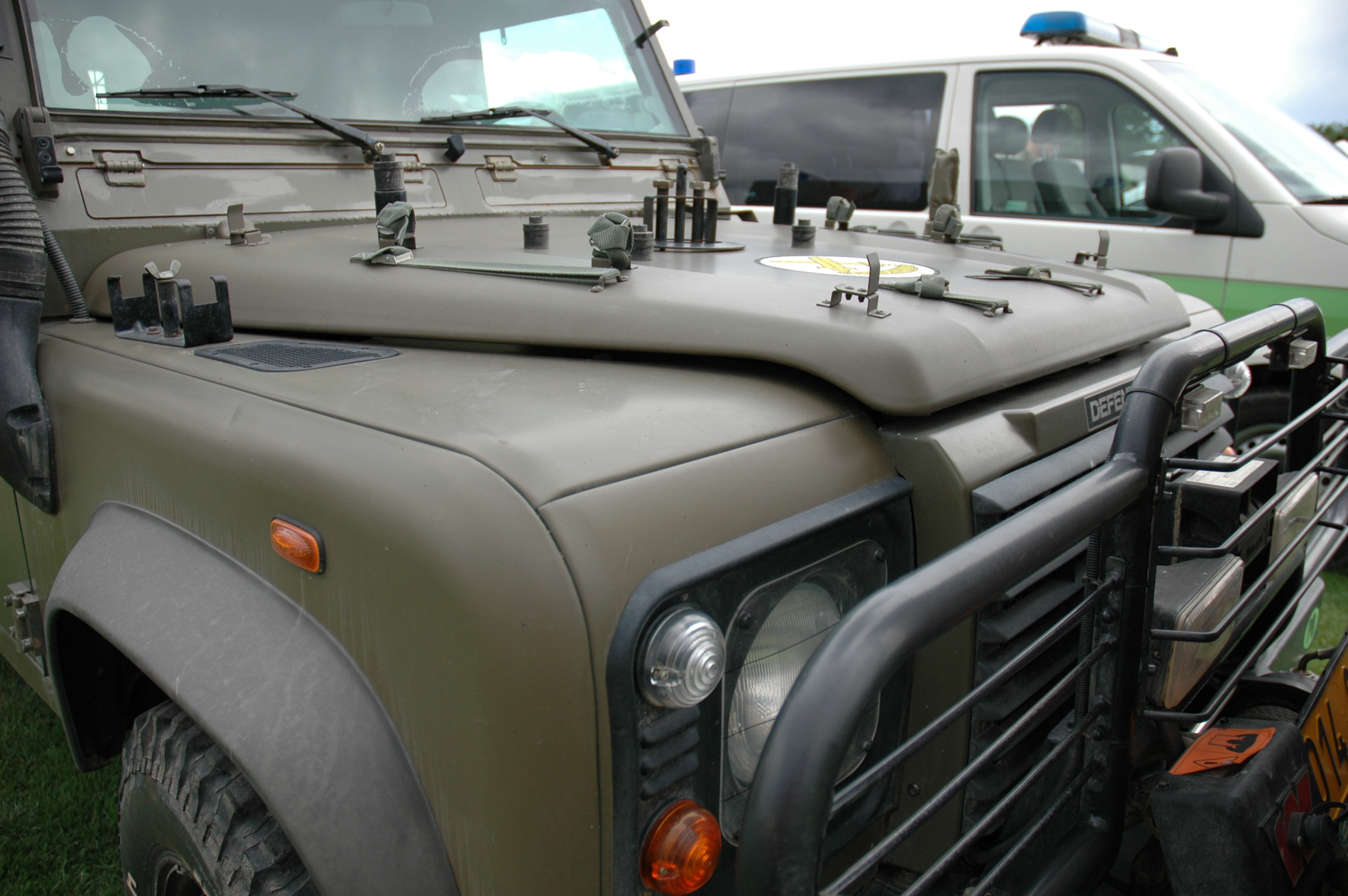
Vehicle of Czech Military police

The Military Police Corps (Czechoslovakia) (Czech vojenská policie) was set up on 21 January 1991. Within the provisions of the Czechoslovak Law No. 124/1992 Dig. regarding the Military Police, they are responsible for police protection of armed forces, military facilities, military material and other state property controlled by the Ministry of Defence. The Military Police are a professional force. Since 1 January 1993, Czechoslovak Military Police Corps were divided to Czech and Slovak separate Military Police Corps.

The Military Police are headed by a Chief, who directly reports to the Minister of Defence.

As of 1 July 2003, the Military Police officers are equipped with accessories black in colour, including their distinctive feature – the black beret.

The structure is based on the territorial principle. The Military Police subordinated headquarters are located in Prague, Tábor, and Olomouc.

Military police officers are assigned directly to military units, and they form also part of military contingents of the Armed Forces of the Czech Republic in foreign deployments. Foreign Deployments:

The military police officers serve within contingents of the Armed Forces of the Czech Republic on foreign operations on the territory of Iraq and on the Balkans, and as of March 2007 its Special Operation Group (SOG) also in southern Afghanistan in the Helmand Province.

Military Police of the Czech republic also contains active reserve units. Members of the active reserve have a civilian profession but several times a year participate in training or other MP activities.

==== Denmark ====
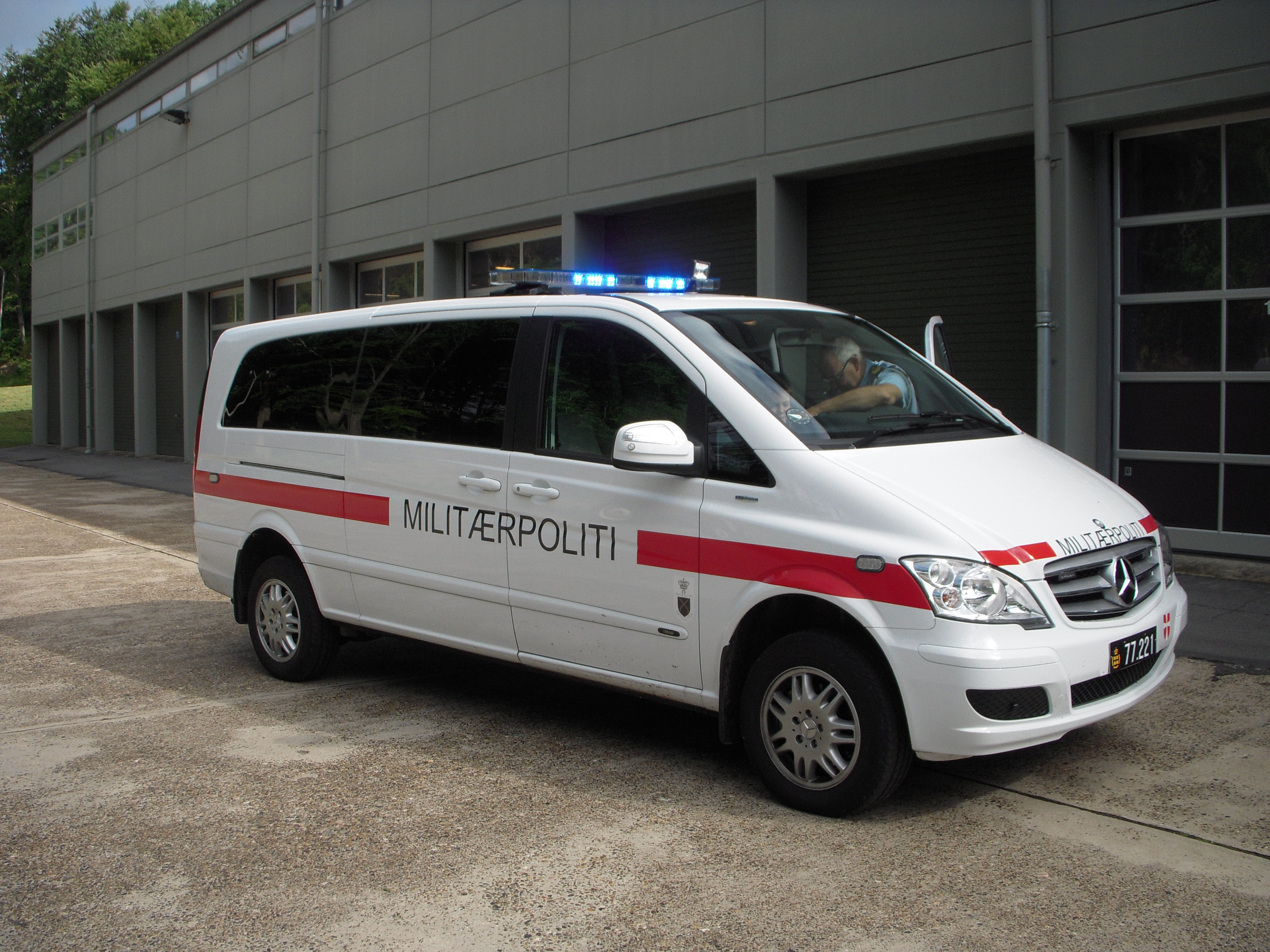
Danish navy military police Mercedes-Benz Viano

In Denmark the military police (Danish: militærpoliti) services are carried out as independent units under each branch. In the army all military police tasks are done as an integral part of the Trænregimentet, whereas the navy military police is an independent unit under command and control of the commanding officer of the Danish Frogman Corps and the air force, as a part of the force protection squadron (Squadron 660) of the air force Combat Support Wing. Unlike the two other branches, the navy military police also handles installation guard duties (which is carried out by regular soldiers in the army and by an installation protection unit under Squadron 660 in the air force) of naval installations as well as certain military installations in the Danish capital region, such as the Danish Defence Command and the Ministry of Defence.

MP personnel typically wear either branch-specific display dress uniforms with white shoulder markings with the text MP or the branch-common daily combat uniform, with a red beret. In the air force the MP-shoulder markings is typically replaced with markings saying either VAGT or GUARD, but for international missions they also use the MP-markings.

MP personnel generally do not have legal authority over civilians in non-military areas but only over military personnel and on military installations (also publicly accessible places like Holmen Naval Base in Copenhagen). On some occasions MP personnel can support civilian police in certain tasks, but will only have slightly more legal authority than civilians—similar to the police home guard.

In the army military police are almost without exception NCOs or officers, whereas the navy and air force rely mainly of Danish ranks OR-1 to OR-3.

Furthermore, the home guard has a police branch, which supports both the civilian Danish police and the military police.

Typical MP jobs are:

- Installation/perimeter guard
- Personnel protection
- Traffic control
- Courier services
- Prisoner transport

==== Estonia ====
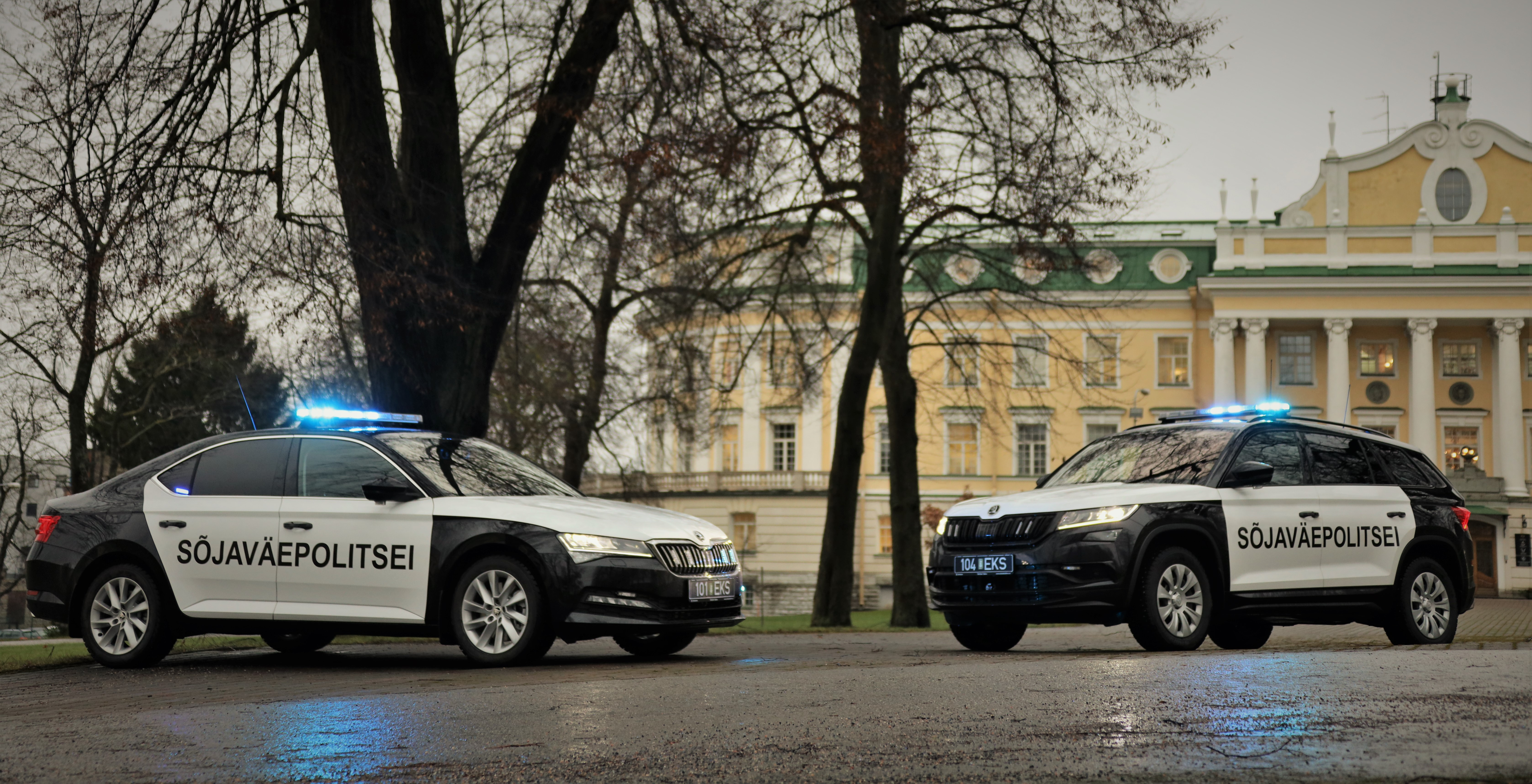
Military Police alarm vehicles

The Sõjaväepolitsei are the Military Police of the Estonian Defence Forces.Kaitsevägi The Estonian MP organization was created in 1994 and is today divided into tactical (patrol) and investigative units. Additionally, conscript-based reserve MP platoons are trained in Guard Battalion every year. MP tasks include investigation of serious disciplinary cases and some armed service-related crimes, supervision of military discipline within the Forces, military traffic control and various security tasks. Within conflict/crises areas (Afghanistan) the MP may provide close protection of the Estonian national representative and other visiting VIPs. When on regular patrol assignment, Estonian MPs wear a black brassard on their right shoulder, with the letters SP in silver, and are usually equipped with an HK USP 9 mm pistol, spare magazines, radio, handcuffs, pepper spray and an expandable police baton.

==== Finland ====
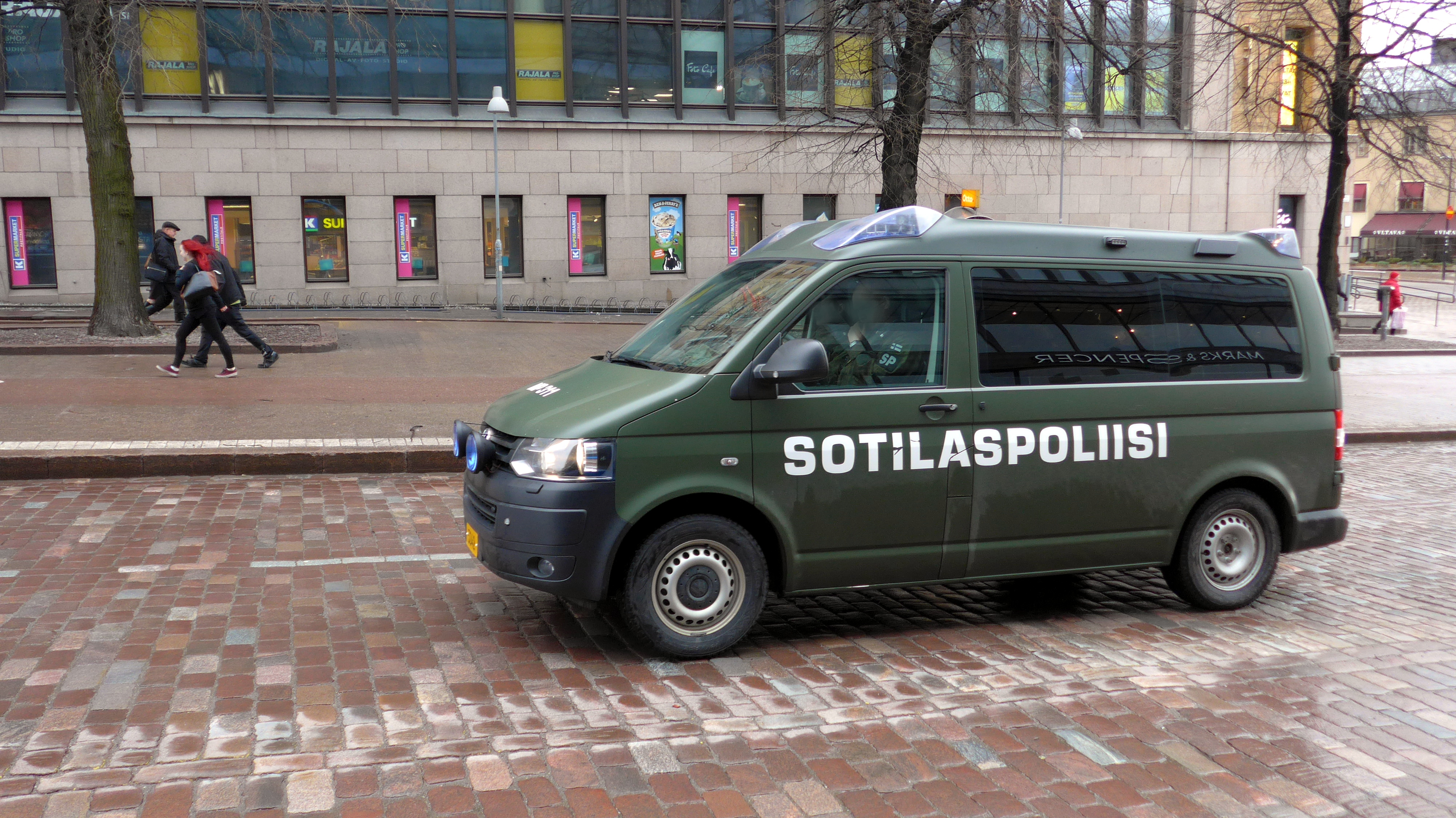
Finnish military police van in Helsinki

The Sotilaspoliisi are the military police of the Finnish Defence Forces. The Finnish MPs wear a black brassard on the left shoulder with the letters 'SP' in white. A military policeman is usually armed with a 9 mm pistol, a baton, pepper spray and handcuffs on their belt. The military police includes both career and conscript personnel, and is primarily used to guard military installations and supervise military traffic. All military police personnel are trained with basic police techniques and usually receive training for fighting in urban areas. In wartime, the tasks are more extensive and include protection of key personnel and targets, especially against enemy special forces, and surveillance, control, pursuit, arrest and destruction missions. For training, almost all brigades have military police companies. The companies are part of and subordinate to the brigade.

The military police has jurisdiction over military personnel, military areas, installations and exercise areas. However, a military police patrol may stop a crime that it witnesses in process in a civilian area. Additionally, if a military police unit is near to a serious crime taking place, such as a robbery or an assault, and the civilian police are delayed, a military police unit that is near to the scene can offer to handle the situation until the civilian police arrive. As with some other Finnish Defence Forces units, the military police can be used to provide assistance to the civilian police when they are undermanned or lack special resources. In such case, the military police may take measures deemed necessary by the civilian police. For example, during the 2005 Helsinki World Athletic Championship Games, military police conscripts and career personnel were placed along the marathon route to prevent the large numbers of spectators from obstructing the runners.

Before and during World War II, Finland did not have military police in peacetime, but only temporary sotapoliisi ("war police"). Ex-police officers were conscripted for police officer duty in the armed forces; usually only the officers had police training. Planning for sotapoliisi was still unfinished at the break of war, so regular reservists could not be conscripted. Thus personnel had to be recruited without regard to quality; conscripts found unfit for field duty for e.g. health reasons, and even those with previous criminal record were recruited, and the reputation suffered. For a long time, sotapoliisi existed only in wartime. However, improvement to this came eventually: the military police school was founded in 1963, and civilian police background was no longer required.

The crimes committed by military personnel are, as a rule, investigated by the military. Minor infractions are usually investigated by the career personnel of the unit, while more serious crimes are investigated by the investigative section of the General Staff of the Finnish Defence Forces. In minor matters, the company commander or their superiors may use disciplinary powers, but more serious cases are deferred to the civilian prosecutor who will take the case to the district court.

==== France ====
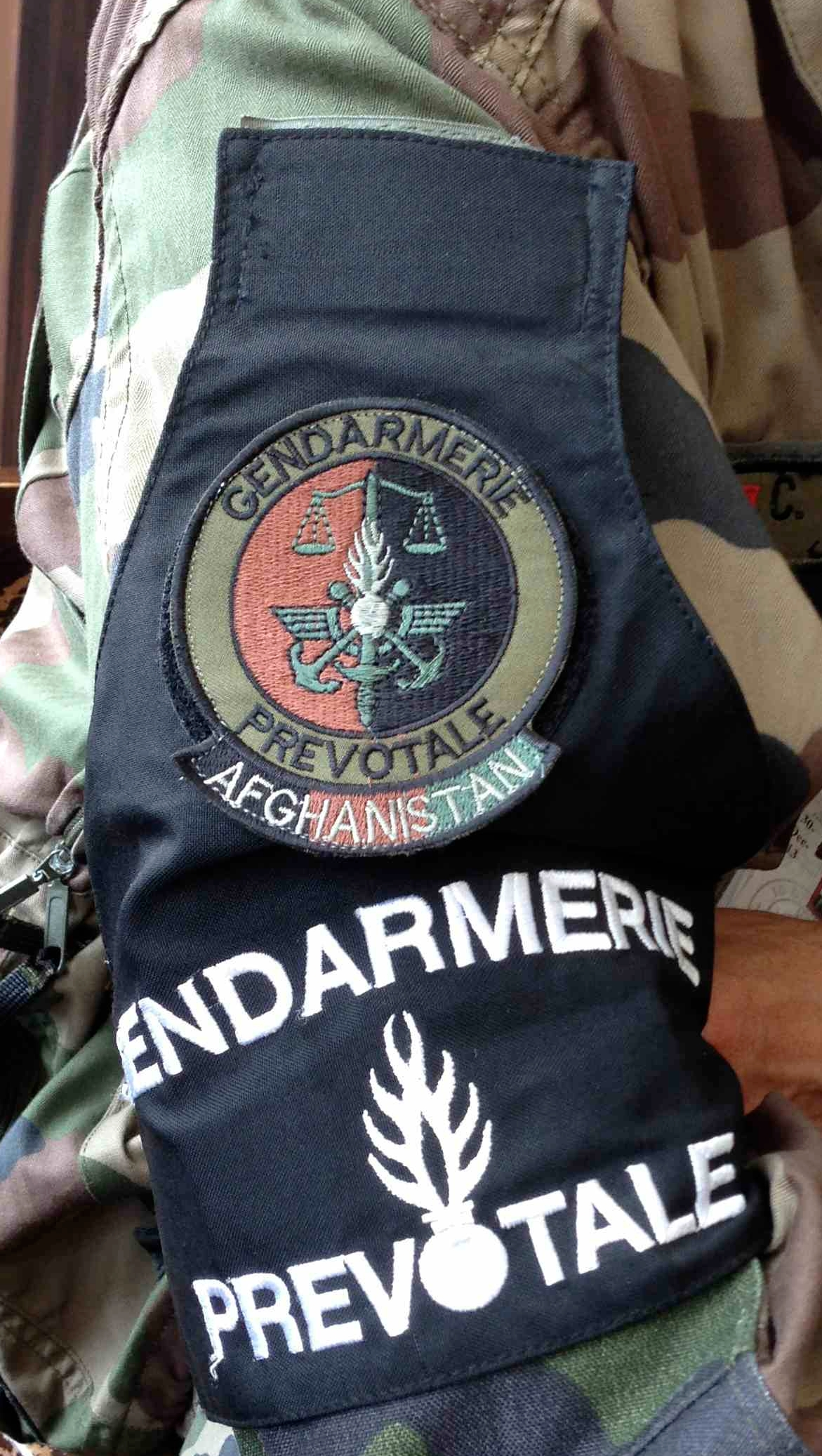
Armband of the Afghani detachment

The National Gendarmerie acts as both the military police and one of the two national law enforcement forces of France. Provost missions are assumed by local units for the garrisons of the Ground Army on French soil and by special divisions :

- The 1100 personnel of the Maritime Gendarmerie police the Navy (and also acts as a coast guard and water police force). National critical merchant ports are protected by specialized units of the Gendarmerie Maritime, the Naval and Harbor Safety Platoons.
- The 860 members of the Air Gendarmerie polices the Air Force fulfills police and security missions in the air bases, and goes on the site of an accident involving military aircraft. This branch is separate from the Air Transport Gendarmerie, which is placed under the dual supervision of the Gendarmerie and the direction of civilian aviation and fulfills police and security missions in civilian airfields and airports. They also perform immigration and emigration checks on military flights.
- The 280 personnel of the Ordnance Gendarmerie (Gendarmerie de l'Armement) fulfill police and security missions in the establishments of the France's defence procurement agency (Délégation Générale pour l'Armement) and ensure VIP close-protection for the head of the DGA and a few other high-rankings.
- The 50 personnel of the Gendarmerie of the Safety of Nuclear Armaments, backed by 250 members of the Mobile Gendarmerie monitor all the nuclear armaments of the French Republic.
- The 70 members of the Provost Gendarmerie (Gendarmerie Prévôtale) conduct judiciary and disciplinary investigations in foreign garrisons.

The Maritime Gendarmerie, Air Gendarmerie, Ordnance Gendarmerie and Provost Gendarmerie are placed under the dual supervision of the Gendarmerie and the relevant military branch. However, for judiciary duties, they are under exclusive command of the relevant court.

In addition to the Gendarmerie, Naval Fusiliers (Fusiliers Marins), Fusilier commandos of the Air Force (Fusiliers Commandos de l'Air) and dedicated regimental platoons maintain order for their respective branches.

==== Germany ====
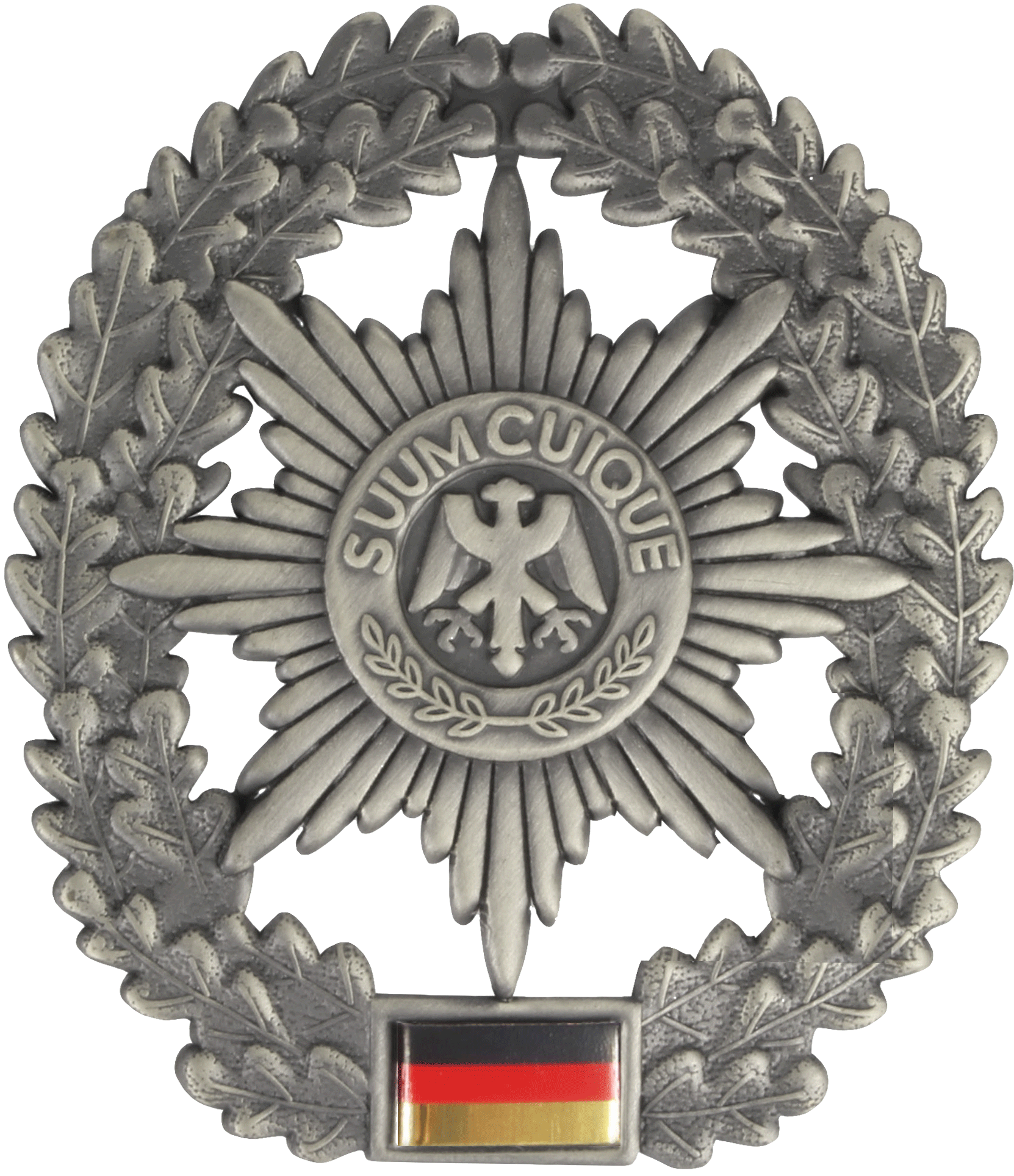
Current badge of the Feldjäger

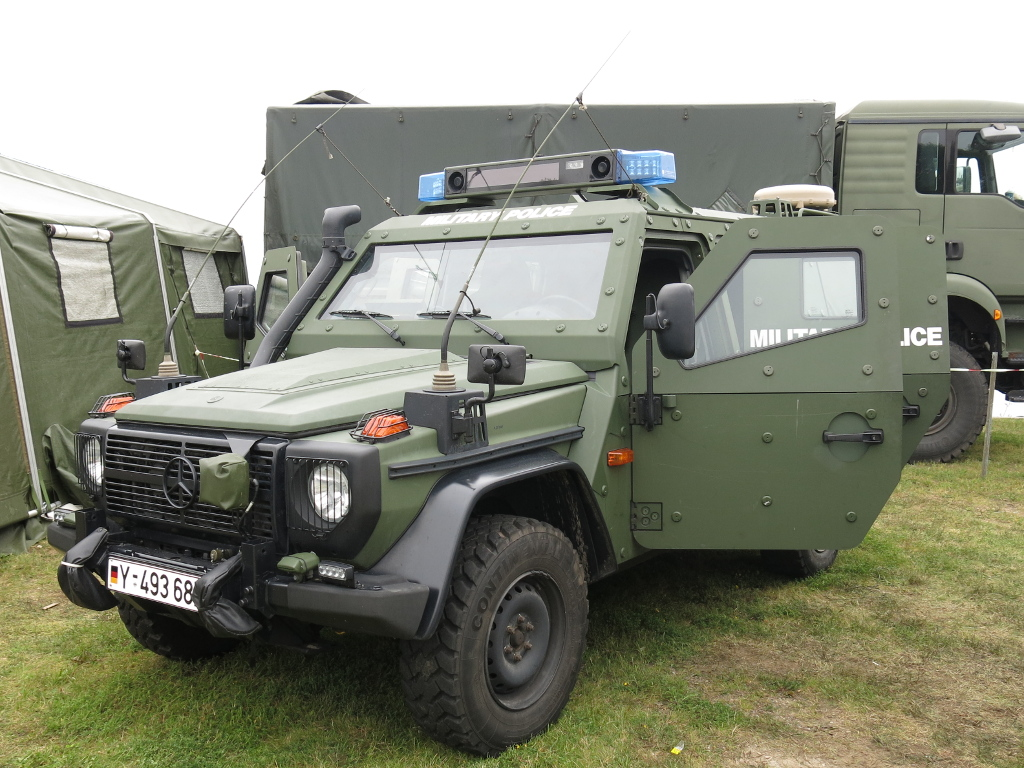
A LAPV Enok armored vehicle of the Feldjäger

The Feldjäger are the military police of the German Bundeswehr. The term Feldjäger ("field hunter") has a long tradition and dates back to the mid-17th century. Their motto is Suum Cuique ("To each his own", derived from Cicero, De Finibus, Bonorum et Malorum, liber V, 67: "(...) ut fortitudo in laboribus periculisque cernatur, (...), iustitia in suo cuique tribuendo.").

The first modern Feldjäger unit was activated on 6 October 1955 when the bill creating the Bundeswehr was signed. The Feldjäger corps serves all component forces of the German Federal Armed Forces (Bundeswehr) i.e., German Army, German Navy, German Air Force, Zentraler Sanitätsdienst (Joint Medical Corps) and Streitkräftebasis (Joint Support Service). The Military Police Command has its headquarters in Scharnhorst Kaserne in Hanover and is under the operational command of the Bundeswehr's Territorial Tasks Command of the Streitkräftebasis. The Feldjäger have three regiments of military police stationed around Germany which are subordinate to the Military Police Command.

==== Greece ====
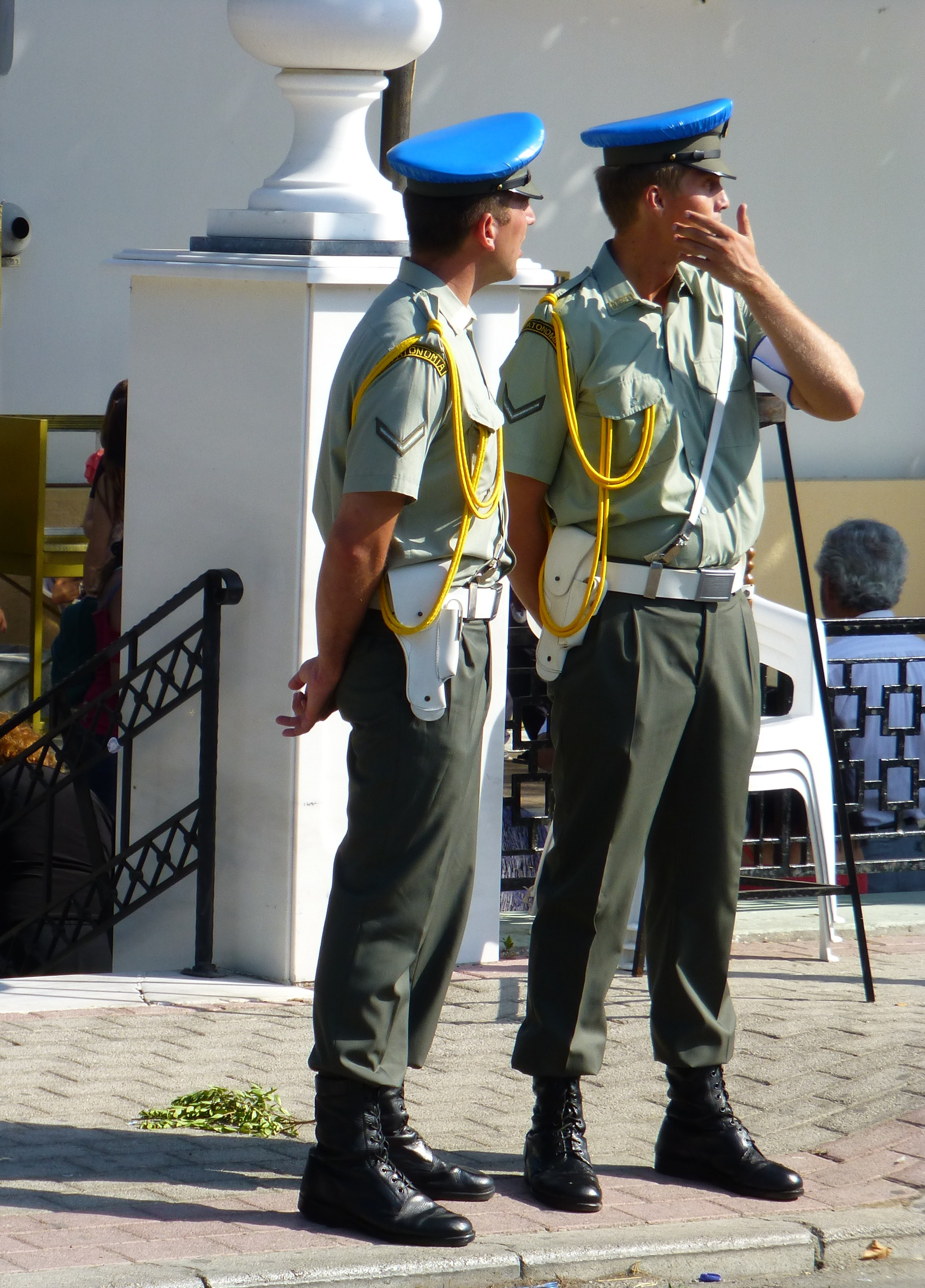
Men of the Greek military police (Stratonomia)

The paramilitary Greek Gendarmerie fulfilled most security and order duties in Greece until World War II. In 1951, Law 1746/51 established the framework of the Hellenic Army's Greek Military Police (Greek: Ελληνική Στρατιωτική Αστυνομία or ΕΣΑ, Ellinikí Stratiotikí Astynomía). The organization—and particularly its Special Interrogative Department, EAT-ESA—became notorious for its brutality during the 1967–1974 military junta. Law 276/76 renamed it simply to "Military Police" (Στρατονομία). Corresponding organizations exist also for other two branches of the Greek armed forces: for the Hellenic Air Force (Αερονομία, Aeronomia), founded in 1945 as the Greek Air Force Police (Ελληνική Αεροπορική Αστυνομία, ΕΑΑ), and for the Hellenic Navy (Ναυτονομία, Naftonomia, properly Υπηρεσία Ναυτονομίας or Y.ΝΑ.)

These three forces work together often but are independent from each other. Most of the personnel are draftee soldiers undergoing their regular military service.

==== Hungary ====
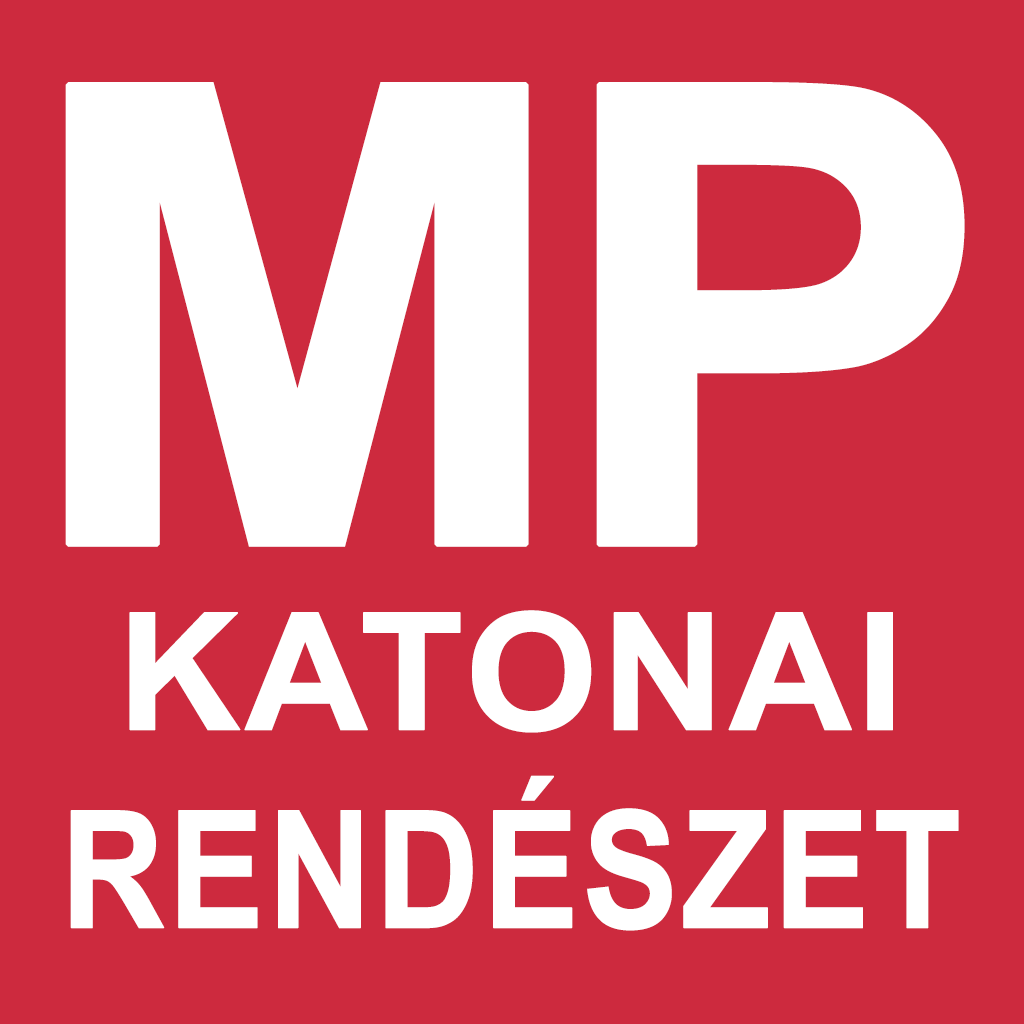
Armband of the Hungarian MP

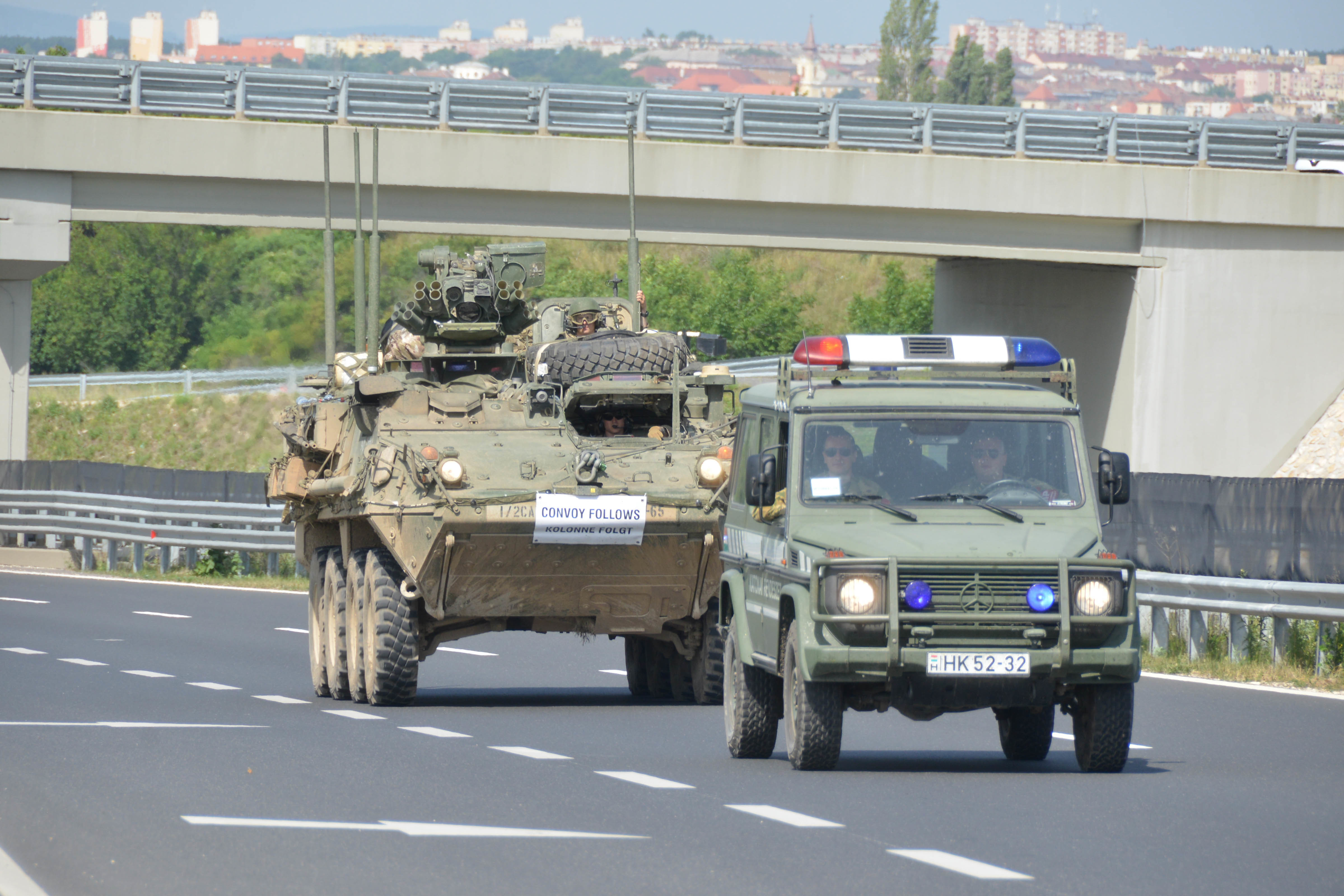
U.S. military convoy escorted by Hungarian Military Police

As part of the Hungarian Defence Forces the Hungarian Military Police (Katonai Rendészet) is a military law enforcement organization with duties of protecting selected objects, investigating accidents involving military vehicles, accompanying military delegations and military forces passing through Hungary, traffic control, personal protection of designated military leaders, performing military police duties in international missions, military law enforcement activities in Hungary.

==== Ireland ====
The Irish Military Police (colloquially "PA"s, deriving from the official title, Póilíní Airm) are responsible for the prevention and detection of crime in the Irish Defence Forces. Entry to the PA is restricted to serving members of the Defence Forces. All members of the corps are non-commissioned officers, with officers being transferred in for temporary assignments. Unlike many military police services, they retain responsibility for controlling access to many, but not all, military posts. In addition, they provide a military detachment to the Oireachtas (Houses of Parliament) and have a large ceremonial role. In the past they had a role in training armed elements of the Garda Síochána but in recent times this has decreased. Historically, they were responsible for detaining political prisoners in military prisons (until the handing over of military prisons at Cork, Spike Island, Arbour Hill and the Curragh to the civil authorities) and in the past occasionally provided firing squads for executions (the last time being the Emergency of 1939–1946).

==== Italy ====
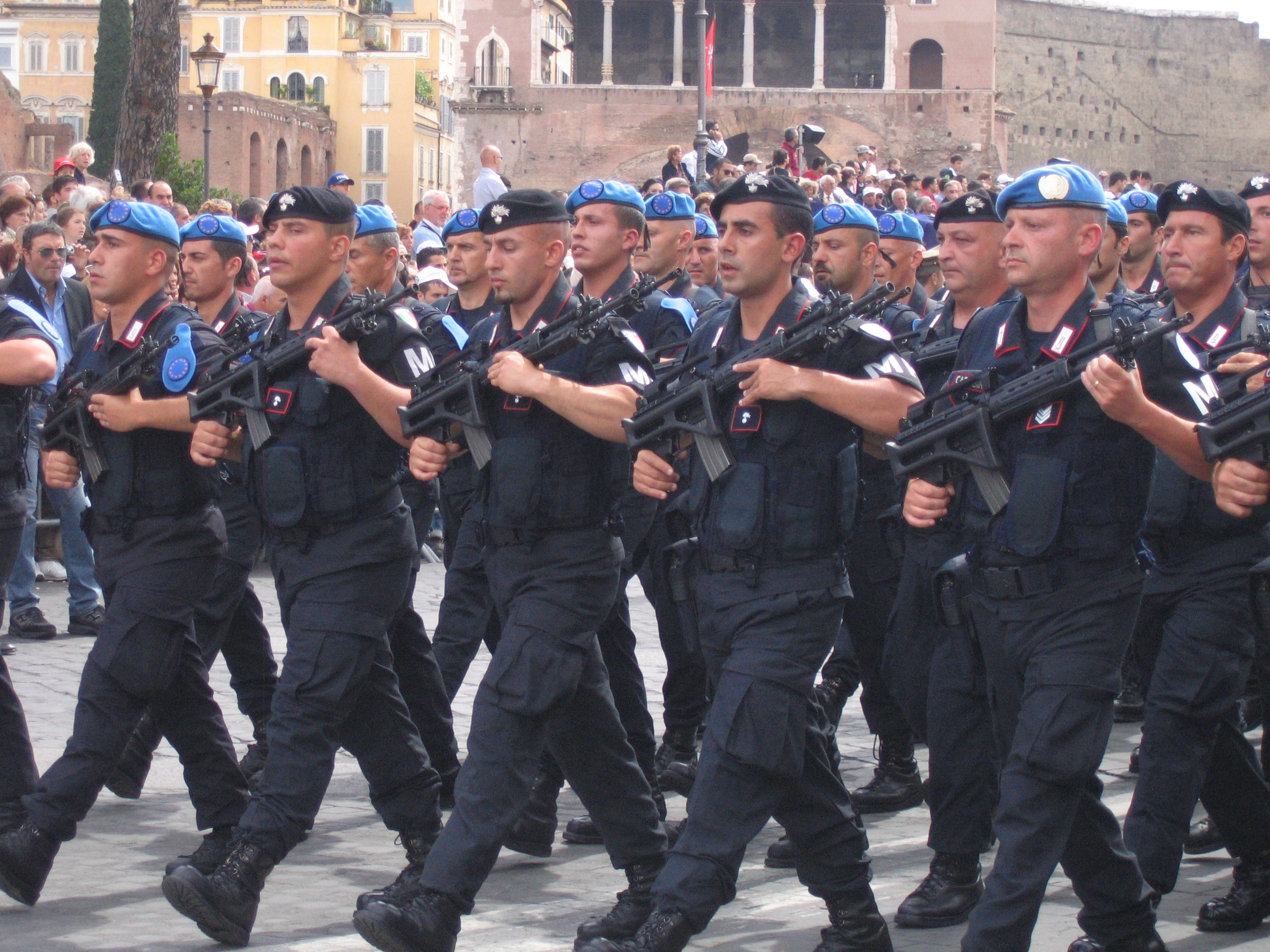
Italian Carabinieri wearing the MP uniform

The Arma dei Carabinieri is a gendarmerie force acting as both the military police and one of the four national police forces in Italy. Formed on 13 July 1814, it has been for almost two centuries the senior branch of the Italian Army, until on 5 October 2000 it became a fully independent Service of the Italian military.

With a strength of about 120,000, the Arma dei Carabinieri is a very large organization, including its own air and naval components, but most of its personnel are used for civilian police duties.

The dedicated military police components of the Arma dei Carabinieri are grouped into the "Divisione Unità Mobili Carabinieri" (Carabinieri Mobile Units Division), organized as follows:

2nd Brigade:

- 1st Carabinieri Parachutist Regiment "Tuscania"
- 7th Carabinieri Battalion "Trentino – Alto Adige"
- 13th Carabinieri Battalion "Friuli – Venezia Giulia"
- Gruppo Intervento Speciale.

From these units are drawn most of the elements that form the Carabinieri MP coys, platoons and detachments assigned to all the major Italian Army, Navy and Air Force units, as well as many of the personnel forming the MSU Regiments (Multinational Specialist Units) and the IPUs (Integrated Police Units) serving abroad in support of European Union, NATO and United Nation missions. The Arma dei Carabinieri have gained a reputation for the professionalism and organization of their MP units in support of international missions, enough that during the 2004 G8 Sea Island Conference the Carabinieri were tasked to organize and run the CoESPU (Center of Excellence for Stability Police Units), to centralize the training of multinational MP units for international missions.

The 1st Brigade of the same "Divisione Unità Mobili Carabinieri", organized into 11 Mobile battalions and 1 Cavalry Regiment, does contribute to form the same military police components as the 1st Brigade, but is mostly tasked with riot control as part of civilian police duties.

During some NATO military missions abroad, the Italian carabinieri contributed to military police operations with the Multinational Specialized Unit.

The Guardia di Finanza acts as a specialized Military Police force when called upon. Its normal duties include being a force acting in border control, customs duties, and police investigations into financial crimes and illegal drug trafficking.

==== Netherlands ====
In the Netherlands, the function of military police is performed by the Koninklijke Marechaussee ("Royal Constabulary"), a separate branch of the military independent of the Army, Navy and Air Force. Besides performing military duties, the Marechaussee is also a gendarmerie force.

The word Marechaussee seems to derive from the old French name Marecheaux given to an ancient court of justice in Paris called the "Tribunal of Constables and Marshals of France". These constables and marshals were to become members of the Gendarmerie, which served as a model for the police forces of both Belgium and the Netherlands. The term Marechaussee was also used for the Continental Army's military police during the American Revolution.

==== Norway ====
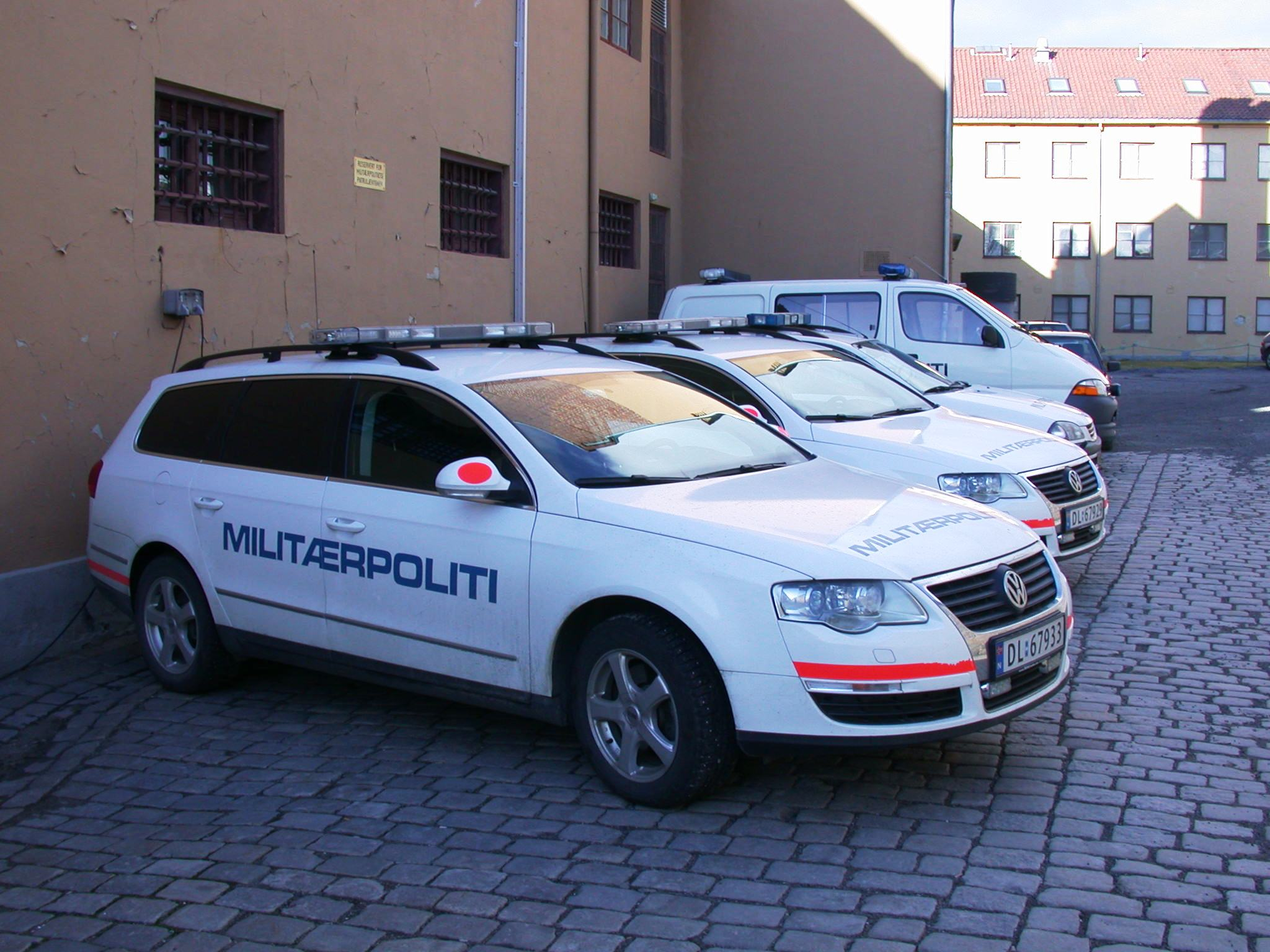
Volkswagen Passats of the Norwegian military police

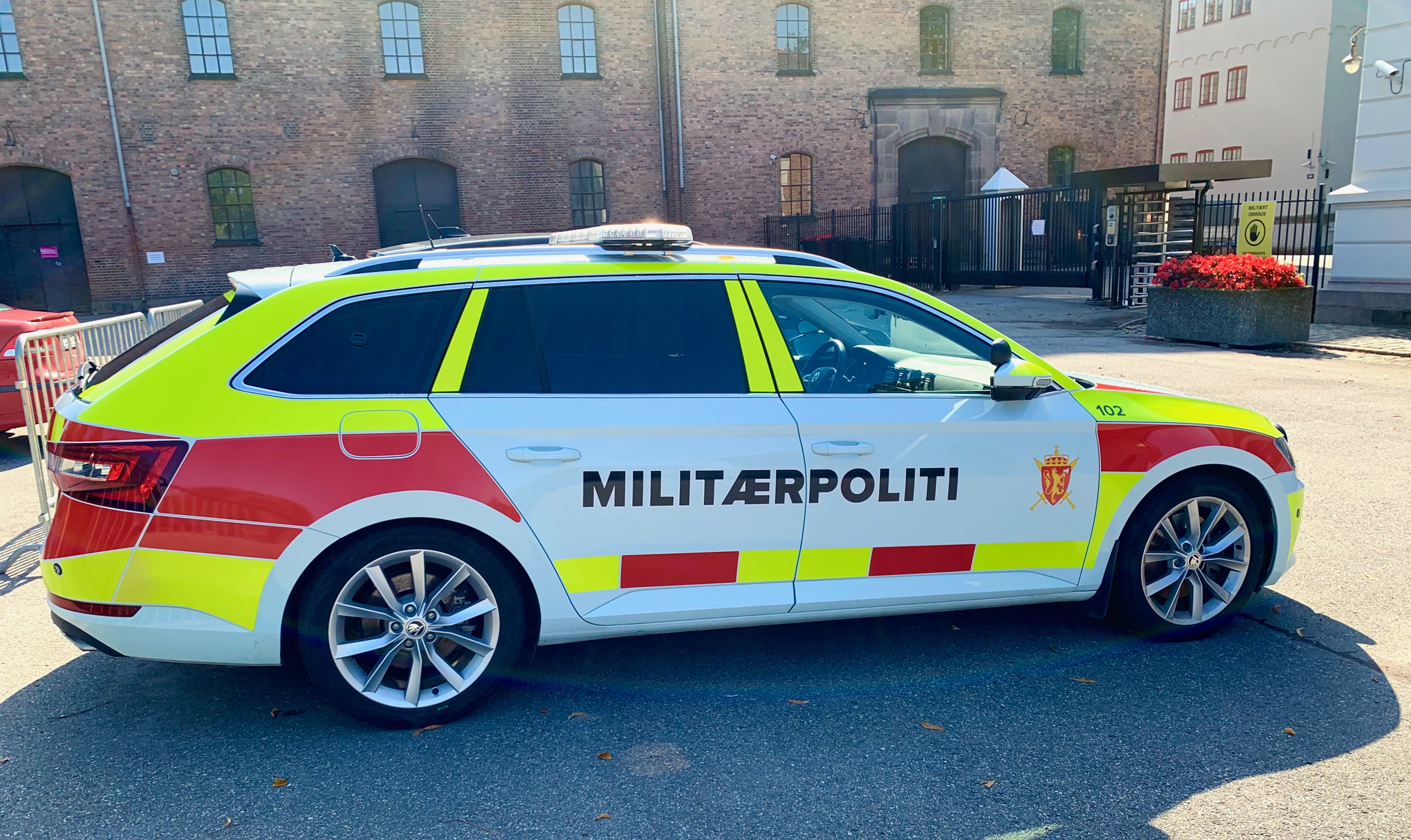
A Skoda Superb in a new livery at Fort Akershus in Oslo

The Norwegian Military Police Regiment (MPREG) is the branch of the Norwegian Army responsible for policing the Norwegian Armed Forces and providing military police support to military commanders in the execution of their missions. The territorial Military Police function in Norway is carried out by the Norwegian Home Guard.

The Regimental Commander's role, responsibilities, and authority include serving as the National MP-chief/Provost Marshal and holding professional responsibility for MP capabilities within the Norwegian Armed Forces.

Current regimental structure (as of 27^{th} of August 2025)

- Provost Staff
- Armed Forces Military Police School
- MP Battalion 2 – allied reception
- MP Coy 1 - training
- MP Coy 3 – provost duties/MP stations
- Special Investigation Unit
- Close Protection Unit

The Military Police function in Norway dates back to the 13th century. The role of the Provost originates from the Army Law of 1628. However, it was not until 1902 that a corps of Military Police was established through the creation of the Cavalry Mounted Police. This was followed by the establishment of the War Police in 1916, consisting of one Detective Unit under Army High Command and six Law Enforcement Units (one for each division).

The modern Norwegian Military Police was founded on the 1^{st} of September 1940 in Dumfries, Scotland. The unit was named the Army Military Police, also known as the Norwegian Military Police (NMP).

After the Second World War, Military Police units were established within the Royal Norwegian Navy, the Royal Norwegian Air Force, and the Norwegian Home Guard. The Armed Forces Military Police School was established in 2002 with the purpose of consolidating force generation and education of the Norwegian Military Police. In 2011, the operational Military Police amalgamated in the Armed Forces Military Police Unit, which was replaced by the Military Police Regiment (MPREG) in 2025.

The historical foundation for Military Police authority, regardless of who it was executed by, has been the enforcement of military discipline and order in support of military commanders in the execution of their missions.

The Norwegian Military Police Act, entered into force on the 1^{st} of July 2024, provides the military police with police authority in order to ensure security, uphold discipline, law and order, and enable crime intervention.

- Full police authority on military grounds, and access area
- Full police authority over all military personnel outside military grounds
- Full police authority for protection of all military personnel, materiel, vehicles, and equipment outside military grounds
- Full police authority to control traffic on all grounds/roads if this will serve a military purpose
- Support the Norwegian civil police when requested
- Special investigators may investigate all military cases, and some civilian cases, led by civilian prosecutors

==== Poland ====
The Military Gendarmerie (Żandarmeria Wojskowa, ŻW) are the MPs for the entire Polish military, established in the 1990s.

==== Portugal ====
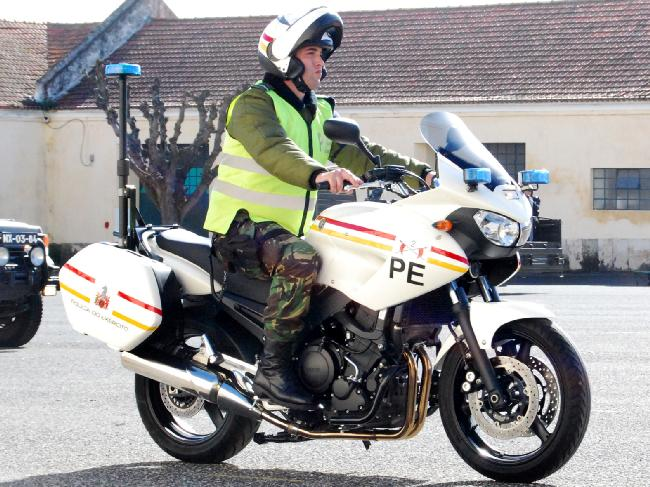
Yamaha TDM 900 of the Portuguese Army Police

In Portugal, each branch of the Armed Forces has its own military police force. The Portuguese Navy has the Polícia Naval (Naval Police), the Portuguese Army has the Polícia do Exército (Army Police), and the Portuguese Air Force has the Polícia Aérea (Air Police). The Air Police is an arm of its own inside the Air Force, but the Army Police is only a speciality of the cavalry arm and the Naval Police is a unit of the Marine Corps (Fuzileiros). A military criminal investigation police, common for the three branches of Armed Forces, also exists, this being the Polícia Judiciária Militar (Military Judiciary Police), that is under the direct dependency of the Minister of National Defense.

Portugal, also, has a gendarmerie type force, the Guarda Nacional Republicana (GNR, National Republican Guard), that is a special corps of troops that executes both civil public security missions and military missions. In time of peace, GNR is under operational command of the Minister of Internal Affairs, but in time of war it can be put under the command of the Armed Forces. GNR is not tasked with enforcing the law within the Armed Forces.

Included in the Portuguese Navy organization also exist two special police forces. The first one is the Polícia Maritima (Maritime Police), that serves as a coast guard and maritime law enforcement agency in the scope of the civil role of the Portuguese Navy as the National Maritime Authority. The other one is the Polícia dos Estabelecimentos da Marinha (Navy's Establishments Police), a small gendarmerie type agency responsible for guarding the Lisbon Naval Base and some other naval facilities.

==== Romania ====
In Romania, the Romanian Military Police (Poliția Militară) carries out police duties for the Romanian Armed Forces. It usually handles military security and military crimes and it has national jurisdiction. The Romanian military police is organized in four battalions (two of them are headquartered in Bucharest, one in Iași and one in Târgu Mureș).

The Romanian Gendarmerie, although a military force with national jurisdiction, is not tasked with enforcing the law within the armed forces (in contrast to the French Gendarmerie, which acts as both military and national police force).

==== Russia ====
The Russian Military Police (Военная полиция России) are the MPs for the entire Russian military. They carry out police duties for the Russian Armed Forces.

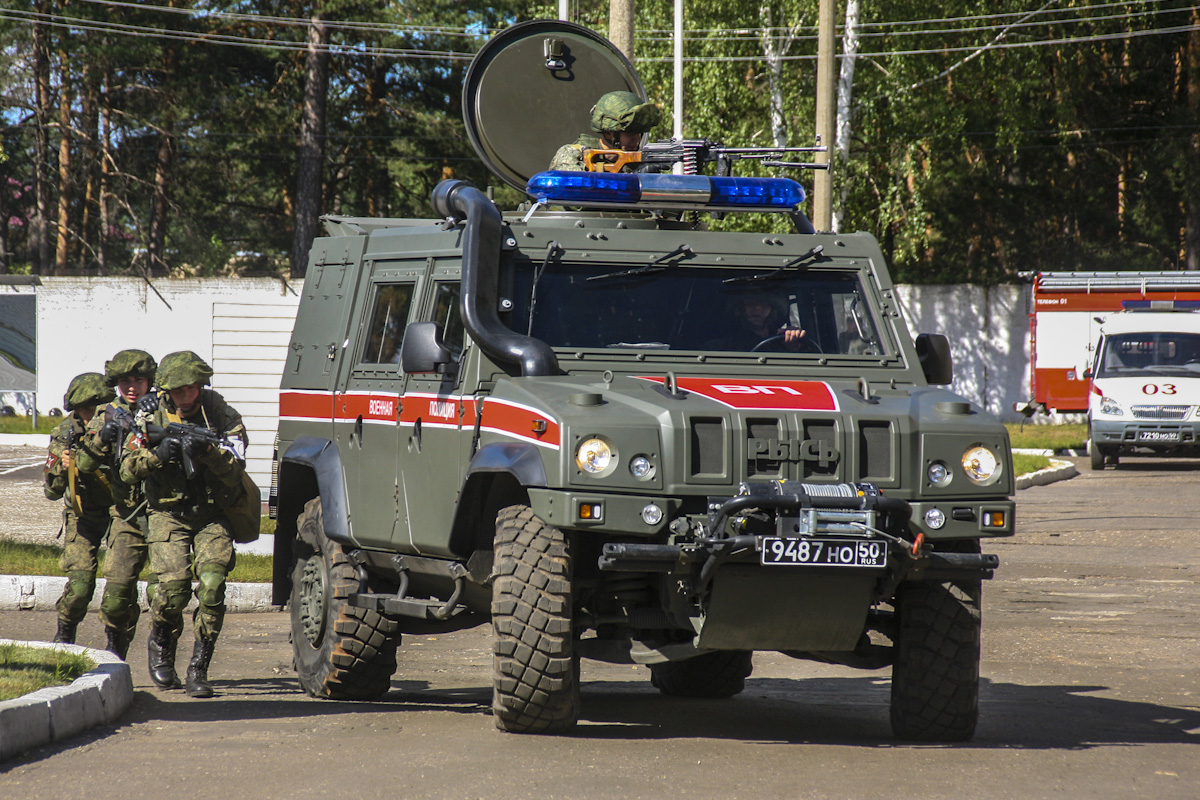
Russian Military Police during exercise

In April 2012 Chief Military Prosecutor Sergei Fridinsky said Russia's military police will be instituted in two stages: first, the integration of the relevant Defence Ministry services and second, granting the new agency investigative functions. In early February 2014 Russian President Vladimir Putin signed into law the Law on Military Police, the State Duma adopted on 24 January and approved by the Federation Council on 29 January. During consideration of the bill in the lower house of the parliament, presidential envoy to the State Duma Garry Minkh explained that military police has already been created and running, but its activities are governed by departmental orders. President's initiative is aimed at strengthening the legal framework of the forces. On 27 March 2015, Russian President approved the Official Charter of the military police of the Russian Federation.

The Military Police have five main functions:

- Maneuver and mobility support operations
- Area security operations
- Law and order operations
- Internment and resettlement operations
- Police intelligence operations

The National Guard of Russia and Federal Security Service has its own military police units.

==== Serbia ====
The Military Police (Serbian: Војна Полиција, Vojna Policija) are considered to be among the best qualified and most combat-prepared organizations within the Serbian military. Their responsibilities include counterterrorist operations, combating organized crime, close protection, securing hostages and search and rescue.

Specific training is provided for members of special units of the Military Police. Drills for Military Police units, from squad to battalion, are based on their anticipated tactical employment, including training in putting down civil disorder. The Military Police Directorate of the General Staff of the Serbian Military is responsible for overseeing the units of the Military Police.

Similar units include:

- Military Police Battalion Cobra
- Military Police Counter-terrorist Battalion

==== Spain ====
Emblem of the Spanish Civil Guard

Emblem and badge of the Spanish Army Military Police

Each branch of the Spanish Armed Forces (Army, Navy and Air Force) has its own military police (Policía Militar, Policía Naval and Policía Aerea respectively). They are only recognized as constabularies with jurisdiction over military installations, military operations and military personnel. They have jurisdiction over civilians off of military installations like Civil Guard (Spain). They are also in charge of the security of military installations, play a role as bodyguards of generals, admirals and other relevant military personnel, provide security services to military transports and police military personnel abroad. They have the consideration of authority agents.

The Civil Guard (in Spanish Guardia Civil) is the Spanish gendarmerie force. Along with their civilian law enforcement functions, due to their military nature the Civil Guard is also assigned several functions as a Military Police under the Minister of Defence, the most important of which is Criminal Investigations in military facilities and vessels, other MP functions include traffic and customs enforcement in international missions.

==== Soviet Union ====
The Soviet Armed Forces did not have any units technically named 'military police'. Two separate agencies handled military police duties on a day-to-day basis.

The Komendantskaya sluzhba or "Commandant's Service" of the Soviet Army wore a yellow letter "K" on a red patch on the sleeve to indicate their membership of this service—the "de facto" army police.

A second organisation called the Traffic Regulators existed within the Rear Services. Traffic Regulators served to control military highway and motor vehicle traffic. Traffic Regulators also wear a white painted helmet with red stripes to indicate their status and either an armband ar patch with the Cyrillic letter "P" (R).

In the Soviet Navy and (later in the present day Russian Navy) the role of Naval provosts was primarily filled by personnel from the Naval Infantry.

==== Sweden ====
The Swedish military police are part of the Life Guards, stationed in Stockholm. There are two MP companies, the 14th and the 15th companies. The 14th MP company serve a so-called GSS/T contract (two years of service over a period of eight years, the remaining time the soldiers can have a civilian job or study) and the 15th MP company serve a so-called GSS/K contract (hired continually for eight years). The Life Guards are also the seat of the Swedish military police unit (MP-enheten) which is responsible for the education of new MPs and is in charge of all MP activities in Sweden. Part of 13th security battalion, which is a counter-intelligence battalion, is also part of the Life Guards and has some soldiers who are trained MPs (mostly corporals and sergeants).

==== Switzerland ====
In the Swiss Armed Forces, the Military Police is responsible for law enforcement on military property and for all incidents where military personnel or equipment is involved. Unlike, for example, the United States, a military policeman in Switzerland has the same power to arrest any person that has committed an offense he witnessed or if he has reasonable grounds to believe the person has committed a violent offense.

Furthermore, the military police provides protection of Swiss representatives abroad and is in part responsible for the guarding of embassies and foreign VIPs in Switzerland, as well as maintaining personal security for members of the Swiss Federal Council. In addition, the Swiss Explosive Ordnance Disposal Center is a branch of the MP for the disposal of unexploded ordnance and also participates in various demining operations around the world.

The professional MP units comprise 758 officers and are divided into four Regions, each consisting of two companies and additional groups specialised on criminal investigations and training. The professional MP maintains a standing tactical team, capable of interventions in Switzerland and abroad, headquartered in Bern. In addition, there are four militia MP battalions with a head count of roughly 2000 men. Each MP Battalion has one tactical company who can be called to support either the primary MP tactical team or cantonal police teams if needed.

Unlike regular army personnel, professional military policemen wear olive uniforms in order to provide distinct identification. Militia MP wear the regular Swiss Army TAZ 90 camouflage. Moreover, the (both the professional and the militia) MP is equipped uniquely, armed with Glock side arms, H&K MP5 submachine guns, the Mzgw91 pump-action rifle and the SG553 assault rifle (compared to the standard issue SIG P220 pistol and SIG 550 assault rifle). Professional MP units drive patrol cars similar to those of the civilian police, but also use Piranha and Duro APCs.

==== Turkey ====
In Turkey, the military police (Askeri İnzibat) is a force that handles military policing.

The larger Turkish Gendarmerie (Jandarma Genel Komutanlığı), is responsible for maintaining law and order in rural areas which do not fall under the jurisdiction of regular police forces.

==== Ukraine ====
The Ukrainian Military Police (VSP) is the military police for the Ukrainian Armed Forces

==== United Kingdom ====
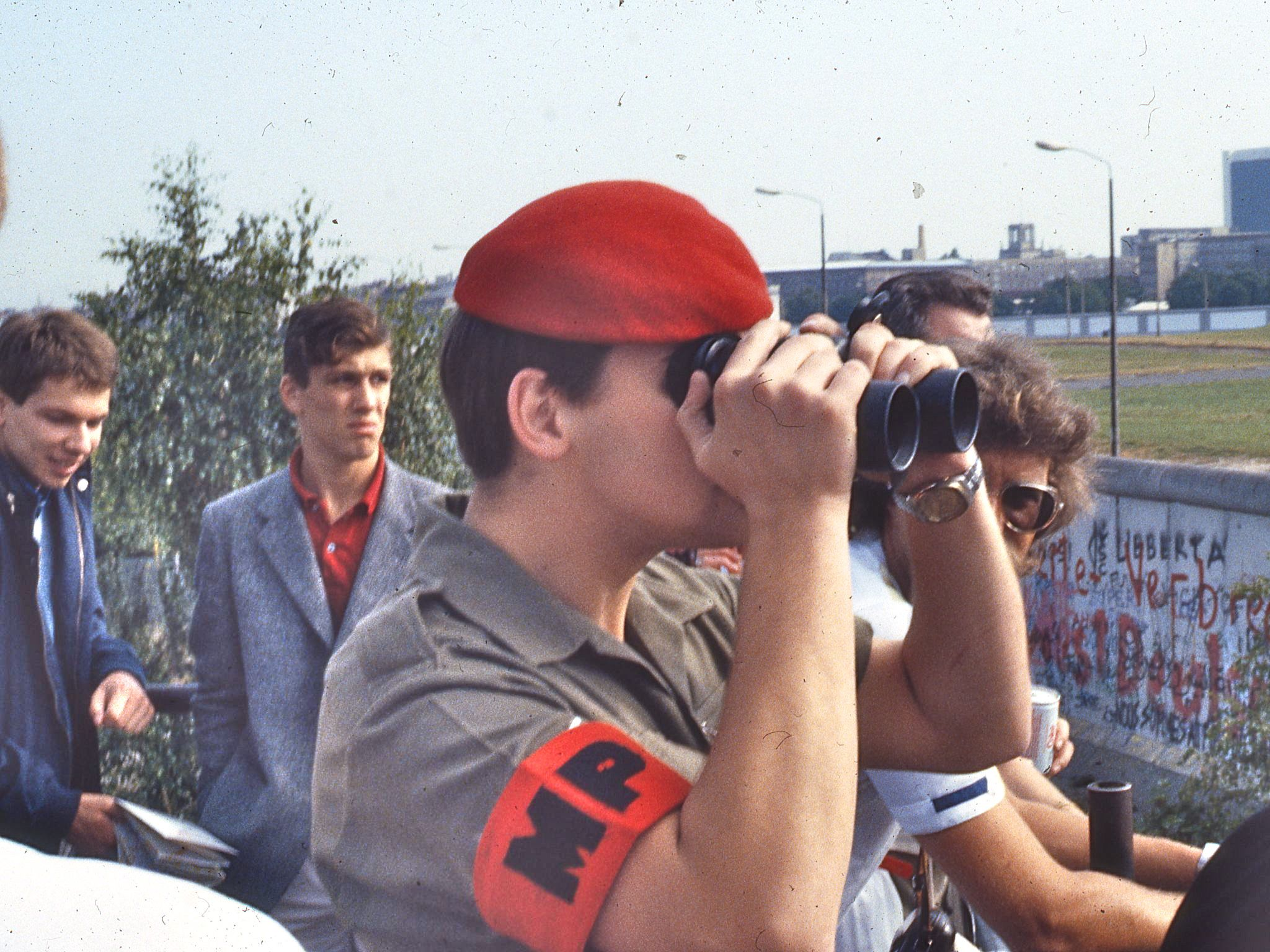
British military police using field glasses to look across the Berlin Wall from a viewing platform on the western side, 1984.

In the United Kingdom the term Military Police usually refers to the Royal Military Police. The Royal Military Police is the branch of the Adjutant General's Corps, responsible for policing the British Army (both in the United Kingdom and overseas). The term Service Police refers to the three separate police organisations for each of the three branches of the UK's Armed Forces:

- The Royal Navy is policed by the Royal Navy Police (RNP), the members of which are traditionally known as Regulators (or Master-at-Arms if a Chief Petty Officer or Warrant Officer).

The Royal Navy Police also provides Royal Marines specialising as service policemen. Prior to 2009, the Royal Marines Police was an independent organisation.

- The British Army is policed by the Royal Military Police (RMP).

In addition to the Royal Military Police, most British Army units have their own Regimental police (RP) and Military Provost Guard Service (MPGS) staff. Sometimes incorrectly referred to as Regimental Police, they do not have any police powers or policing function, but are soldiers responsible for discipline within their own units. They are normally located in the Guardroom.

- The Royal Air Force is policed by the Royal Air Force Police (RAFP). The RAFP provides not only a full Policing function, but they also fulfil a security and counter intelligence function for the RAF and the wider defence community.

In addition, each of the three service police has its own Special Investigation Branch (SIB) to undertake investigation of more serious crime and plain-clothes investigations, and use the joint Service Police Crime Bureau operated by the RNP, RMP and RAFP.

=== Oceania ===
==== Australia ====
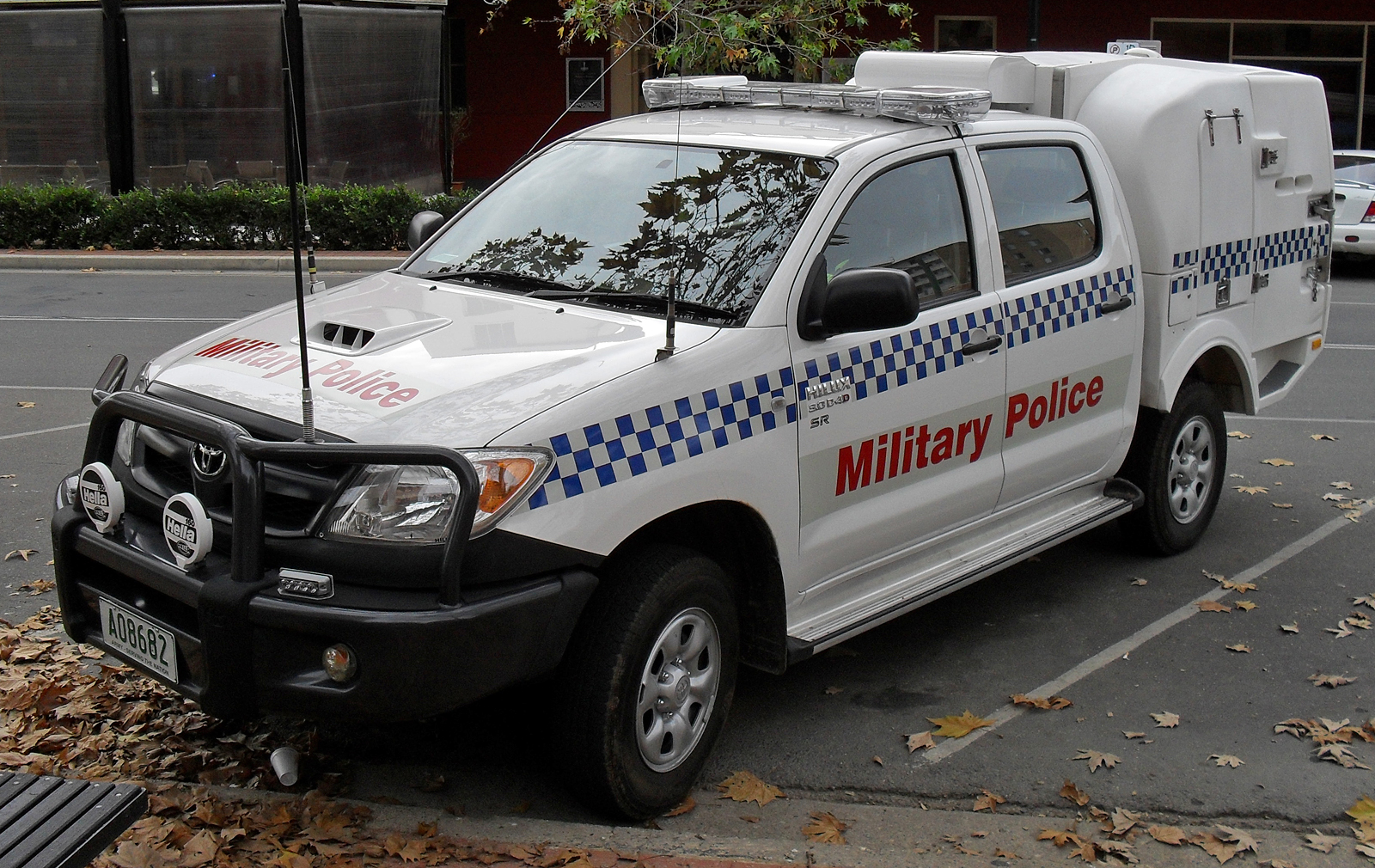
Military Police vehicle in Australia

In Australia, Service Police refers to services policing three different military branches:

- The 1st Military Police Battalion is the field component of the Military Police and the Domestic Policing Unit is the garrison policing component. In the Australian Army, the Royal Australian Corps of Military Police also performs the role of a secondary communications network in the front battle zone. Army MP's wear a red shoulder patch with MP in black.
- In the Royal Australian Navy, the Naval Police Coxswain Branch performs dual roles of performing general police duties, investigation of criminal offences and a secondary role of ships' coxswain staff responsible for administration of ships' personnel.
- In the Royal Australian Air Force, the Air Force Police perform the military police role. The Air Force Police organisation falls within Security Forces, therefore their role is largely providing force protection and enforcing military and civilian laws. Air Force Police members wear either a black brassard or patch with white SP meaning Service Police.

The Royal Australian Corps of Military Police train their own working dogs for a more Infantry/combat role.

All major crimes committed by or against personnel of the Australian Defence Force are investigated by the Australian Defence Force Investigative Service.

==== New Zealand ====
The Joint Military Police Unit (JMPU) is a tri-service military police unit from the Navy, Army, and Air Force.

JMPU comprises military police personnel from the Royal New Zealand Navy Naval Police, Royal New Zealand Military Police, and the Royal New Zealand Air Force Police. Personnel still maintain their own single service identity but operate under a single Provost Marshal and investigate offences against the Armed Forces Discipline Act 1971.

JMPU operates outside of the normal Navy, Army and Air Force command structure. The current Provost Marshal is a Group Captain who reports directly to the Vice Chief of the NZDF.

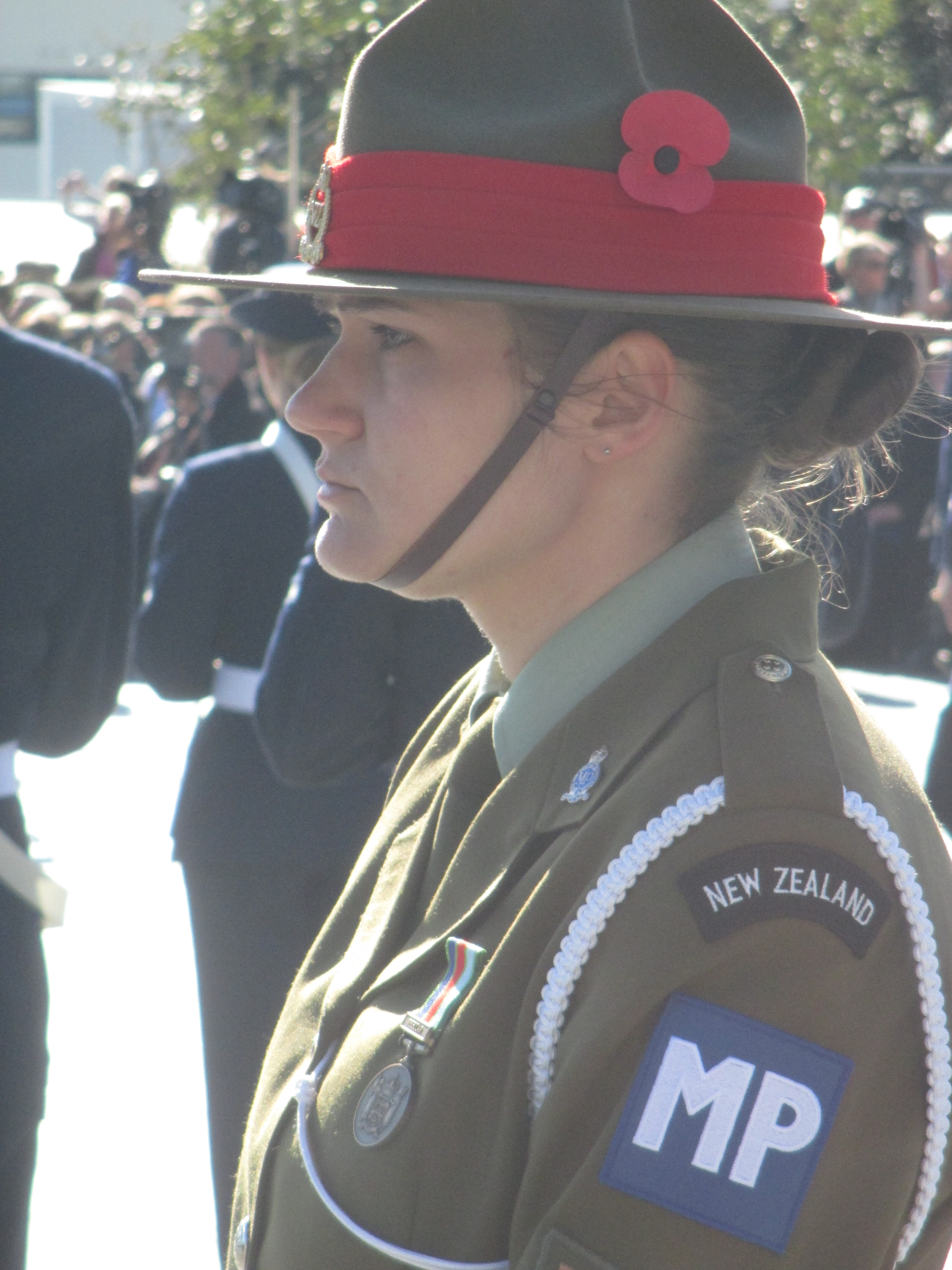
The "MP" patch identifies this woman as being a member of the Joint Military Police Unit.

For all serious and complex investigations that are outside the scope of regular Military Police personnel a specialised unit known as the Special Investigations Branch (SIB) handles all high-profile investigations. SIB personnel attend courses with the New Zealand Police Criminal Investigation Branch. SIB have a similar role to the Australian Defence Force Investigative Service (ADFIS). SIB are also seconded to the NZ Police CIB.

JMPU also provide the close protection function for the NZDF. Only personnel from within the unit are able to attend the Tier 1 course and undergo a rigorous selection process. From time to time NZ Police officers from the Diplomatic Protection Squad and the Armed Offenders Squad have been known to also complete the course.

JMPU complete certain NZ Police courses such as Urgent Duty Driving, Disaster Victim Identification, Basic and Intermediate Crash Investigation with the NZ Police Serious Crash Unit, and some personnel have completed the Diplomatic Protection Squad training course.

JMPU are responsible for all detainee handling both in peacetime and in an operational environment such as custody and escort of POWs. Military Police are responsible for maintaining discipline at the Services Correction Establishment (SCE) which is located at Burnham Military Camp. SCE is the NZDF Military Prison and consists of guards who are all serving members of JMPU. The guards are responsible for rehabilitation of service personnel who have been sent to the facility as a result of serious offences committed against the Armed Forces Discipline Act 1971.

JMPU are identifiable by the blue and white "MP" patch they wear on their uniform and the blue beret as head dress, the wearing of the blue beret differs from many commonwealth military police units as traditionally a red beret is worn.

JMPU wear their respective service dress for each service. During peacetime JMPU wear either a Multicam Camouflage uniform, or blue uniform with a SRBA vest.

== Air force police ==
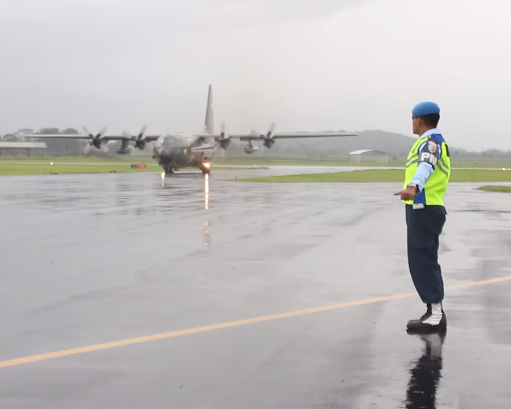
An Indonesian Air Force Military Police officer on a taxiway in the Abdul Rachman Saleh airbase, Indonesia

Air force police or sometimes known as "Air police" refers to certain units that are part of a country's air force that perform law enforcement duties such as force protection and air patrols, dealing primarily with the enforcement of aviation law at air force bases. It also indirectly plays a part in ensuring the air sovereignty of a country. It serves similarly to military and paramilitary police forces around the world and are commonly set up as a branch of a nation's military police or even a separate institution altogether. In some countries, the Air force police are also responsible for conducting Provost duties in the scope of a country's air force, such as implementing crime investigation and enforcing discipline/order towards members of the Air force.

=== By country ===
- (Australia) Royal Australian Air Force Air Force Police
- (Canada) Canadian Forces Military Police The Air Force Military Police Group
- (France) Air Gendarmerie
- (India) Indian Air Force Police
- (Indonesia) Indonesian Air Force Military Police Command (Puspomau).
- Air Police Group, Japan Air Self-Defense Force
- (Malaysia) Air Force Police, Royal Air Force Regiment
- Royal New Zealand Air Force Police
- (Portugal) Polícia Aérea
- (South Korea) Military police of the Republic of Korea Air Force
- Sri Lanka Air Force
- (Turkey) Turkish Air Force
- (United Kingdom) Royal Air Force Police
- (United Kingdom) No. 3 (Royal Auxiliary Air Force) Police Squadron
- United States Air Force Security Forces
- Venezuela Air Force Police

== See also ==
- Military police vehicle
- Police tactical unit
- Separation of military and police roles
