= British Indian Ocean Territory Police =

Military police force of the BIOT

- Abbreviation: BIOT Police

Jurisdictional structure
- Operations jurisdiction: UK
- General nature: Military provost; Local civilian police

Operational structure
- Headquarters: Diego Garcia, BIOT
- Service Polices: 10
- Parent agency: MOD

Website
- biot.gov.io/about

The British Indian Ocean Territory Police serve in the British Indian Ocean Territory (BIOT), situated in the Indian Ocean halfway between Tanzania and Indonesia. BIOT is a territory which does not have a permanent civil population, like some other British Overseas Territories. The population are mostly members of the British Armed Forces and United States Armed Forces.

As such the BIOT police consists of Royal Overseas Police Officers (ROPO), who are all currently members of either the Royal Marines or Royal Navy.

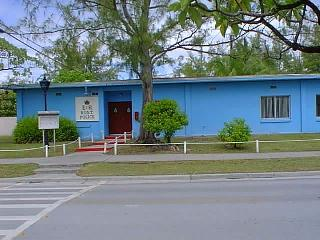
Headquarters of the British Indian Ocean Territory Police, Diego Garcia, 2005.

== Organisation ==
The BIOT police (as of 2015) consists of:

- Senior Police Officer (ROPO 1) (Royal Navy Master at Arms or Royal Marine Colour Sergeant with Special Investigation Branch (SIB) experience) who acts as: the senior police person for the island, Primary Liaison Officer between international police forces, superintendent of prisons, senior officer in charge of supervision of ROPOs and provide reassurance to the island community regarding police and criminal activity. They are responsible to the BIOT Commissioner
- Assistant Senior Police Officer (ROPO 2) (Royal Navy Senior Rate) who assists ROPO 1 with his/her duties. They are SIB and CSI trained.
- ROPO 3 - Royal Navy Police Senior Rate. (SIB experience and CSI trained).
- ROPO 4 - Royal Navy Police Senior Rate.
- ROPO 5 - Royal Military Police Corporal, female.
- ROPO 6 - Royal Air Force Police Corporal, dog handler.
- ROPO 7 - Royal Marines Police Corporal/Lance Corporal.
- ROPO 8 - Royal Navy Police Leading Regulator, female.
- ROPO 9 - Royal Navy Police Leading Regulator.
- ROPO 10 - Royal Marines Police Corporal/Lance Corporal

== Duties ==
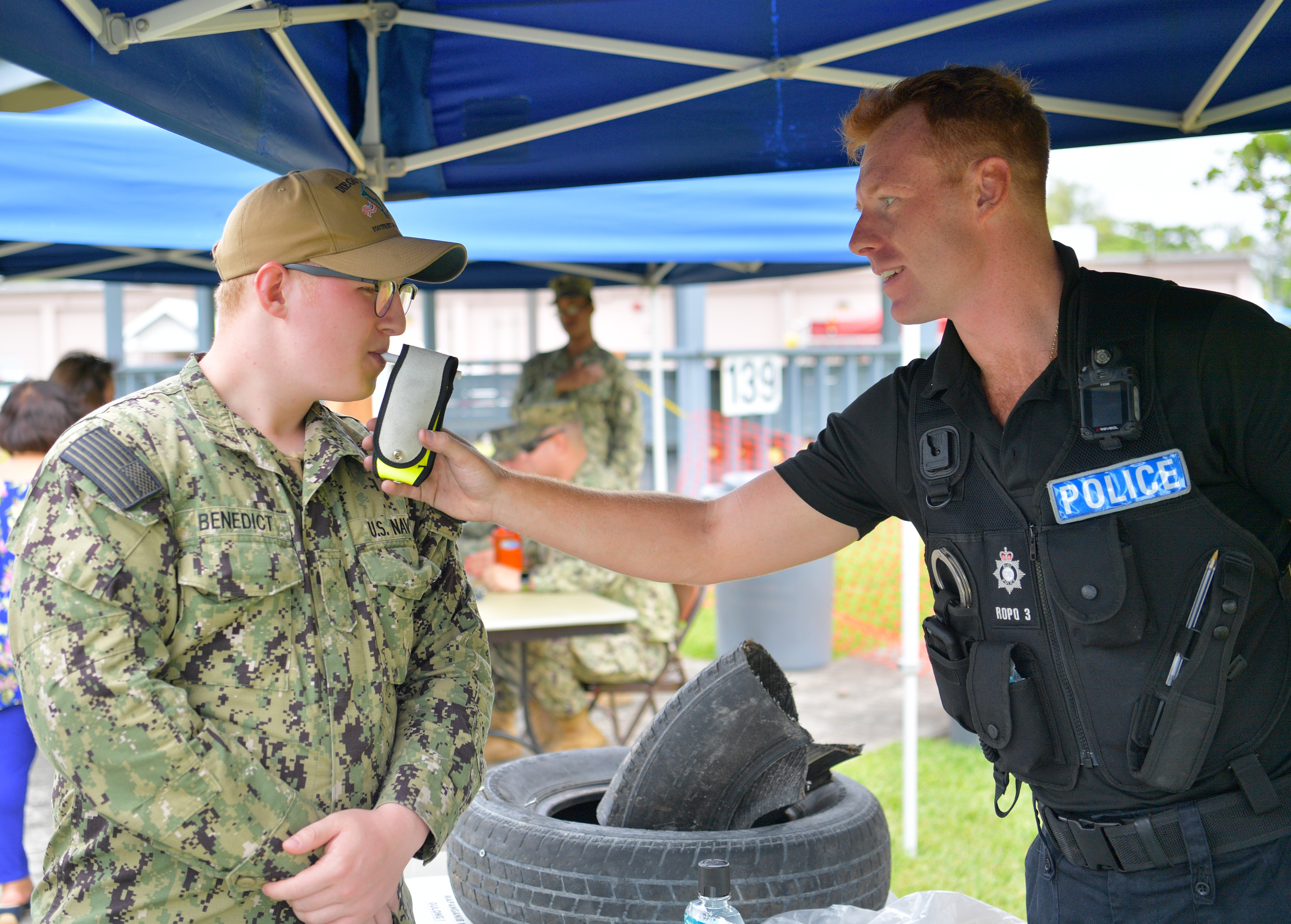
A ROPO 3 of the Royal Navy Police administers a breathalyzer to a U.S. Navy yeoman stationed on Diego Garcia.

The offences dealt with by BIOT police have included:

- Road traffic offences (including fixed penalty notices)
- Sexual offences
- Offences against the person
- Drug abuse/misuse
- Theft/fraud
- Criminal damage
- Burglary
- Public order/drunk and disorderly
- Illegal fishing activity
- Fire arms/ammunition
- MDA/importation
- Special investigation, e.g. sudden death – a murder occurred in 1988, with the perpetrator sentenced to life imprisonment

== Uniform and vehicles ==
The ROPOs have epaulettes with collar numbers to identify them, similar to UK civilian police uniforms.

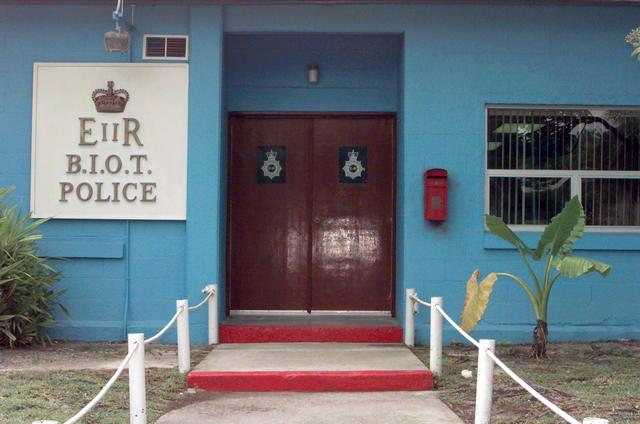
The BIOT Police station, Diego Garcia.

== United States Navy presence ==
The United States Navy (USN) has a Naval Support Facility at East Point Plantation and entry to it needs a police permit.

== See also ==
- British Indian Ocean Territory topics
- Government of the British Indian Ocean Territory § Judiciary
- Law enforcement in the United Kingdom
- List of UK police forces - overseas territories
