= Royal Military Police Close Protection Unit =

British military police unit

The Service Police Close Protection Unit (CPU) is a joint unit within the British Army's Royal Military Police (RMP) Royal Air Force Police (RAFP) & Royal Marines Police Troop (RM Police Troop) that has designated responsibility for protecting senior military and government personnel when deployed overseas. The unit itself does not supply the majority of the manpower for such taskings, but trains individuals from the RMP, Royal Navy Police, RAF Police and Royal Marines Police Troop for the role, as well as taking on urgent and short-notice taskings.

== History ==
The CPU was formed in the early 1970s, after a number of RMP bodyguards attended the Special Air Service bodyguard course at Hereford, and brought the skills back to an RMP-specific course, the first of which ran in 1976. Three years later, the course and unit moved to Longmoor Camp where it remains.

== Structure ==
The CPU is a sub-unit within the Service's Police Specialist Operations Regiment, commanded by a major. It is considerably smaller than most Joint Policing companies, however, with just a small Tri service staff of experienced CP operatives who act as instructors or are held ready to deploy on short-notice tasks.

== Role ==
Close protection operatives trained by CPU protect high-ranking British army officers in high-threat environments, most notably during the Iraq war and Afghanistan war, and ensuring counter-insurgency and peacekeeping operations. They also protect British ambassadors and other high-ranking Foreign and Commonwealth Office officials in locations where the threat level demands it.

== Training ==
The CPU offers a range of training courses. These include the eight-week Close Protection Course that qualifies service police men and women to be CP operatives, a further eight-week pre-deployment training course carried out before teams deploy overseas, and specialist driving courses for locally employed civilian drivers.

== Equipment ==
The CPU trains and deploys with a range of specialist weapons not used by the majority of the British army. These include the Diemaco C8. In the past the SIG Sauer P226 was utilised; however, this has been replaced with the Glock 19. The H&K MP5K is still utilised. The H&K 417 is used for longer distance engagements and deemed necessary on deployments by the Team Leader & 2iC. In the future the Close Protection Unit is exploring the purchase of the SIG Sauer MCX.

== See also ==
- Protection Command
