= Special Investigation Branch =

Detective branch of the British military police

- Country: United Kingdom of Great Britain and Northern Ireland
- Allegiance: HM The King
- Branch: All arms
- Type: Service Police
- Role: Police

Special Investigation Branch (SIB) was the name given to the detective branches of all three British military police arms: the Royal Navy Police, Royal Military Police and Royal Air Force Police. It was most closely associated with the Royal Military Police, which had the largest SIB. SIB investigators usually operated in plain clothes, although they did wear uniforms when serving overseas. Members were usually senior non-commissioned officers (sergeants or petty officers or above) or commissioned officers, although the Royal Air Force SIB was open to corporals and Acting Corporals. In December 2022, the new tri-service Defence Serious Crime Unit replaced all three service SIBs. All staff retain their own single service trades and identities, but now work within one combined unit.

== Royal Navy Police SIB ==
The Royal Navy SIB was the smallest of the three SIBs, with the SIO holding the rank of Lieutenant Commander. They investigated:

all incidents falling within Schedule 2 of the Armed Forces Act 2006;

- Level 3/4 investigations;
- circumstances prescribed in accordance with the Armed Forces Act 2006;
- complicated cases involving multiple units (for instance, assaults involving a large number of personnel from different ships).

== Royal Military Police SIB ==
Although an SIB appears to have existed in the British Army of the Rhine in Germany between 1919 and 1926, the origins of the army's SIB are in 1940, when twenty Scotland Yard detectives were enlisted in the Corps of Military Police to deal with the pilfering of military stores within the British Expeditionary Force (BEF) in France. The unit was formed on the recommendations of Detective Chief Inspector George Hatherill (who later went on to investigate the serial killers John Reginald Christie and John George Haigh, and the Great Train Robbery) and command was given to Detective Superintendent Clarence Campion, head of Scotland Yard's Criminal Record Office, who was commissioned as a major. Campion was hit in the head by shrapnel during the Dunkirk evacuation and died on 20 May 1940, the only SIB casualty of the BEF. After this beginning, the SIB was established on a full-time basis. One of the first group of detectives, Frank Elliott, was sent out to Cairo, Egypt. Under the supervision of Colonel Claude Harper, Elliott managed a 500-man force which investigated crime in Egypt, Palestine and later Libya.

The SIB (RMP) consisted of about three hundred personnel, including Scenes of Crime Officers and forensic technicians. It was divided into numbered units called Investigation Platoons (for instance, 33 Inv Pl SIB Regt), which are subdivided into Detachments, each usually commanded by a Warrant Officer Class 2. There was a section or detachment on most major British Army stations. There was also an Army Reserve section, made up of CID officers and ex-regular SIB. The Headquarters SIB Regiment was located at Campion Lines at Bulford, Wiltshire. Within the RMP, SIB is known as "the Branch" or more commonly "the Feds".

In 2006 the SIB was subjected to an inspection by Her Majesty's Inspectorate of Constabulary (HMIC). The Armed Forces Bill 2006 seeks to require the SIB to refer investigations into inherently serious crimes directly to the Service Prosecuting Authority (SPA) rather than to commanding officers.

SIB recruit class 1 and 2 Cpl's from the General Police Duties employment group of the Royal Military Police, and each candidate undergoes 12 months Foundation Training to determine suitability. During training, an extensive testing phase is completed utilizing the Distance Learning Package (DLP), coupled with a series of exams including the entrance exam. Students who pass the entrance exam are eligible for further training on the Serious Crime Investigation Course (SCIC), a 9-week residential course held at the Defence School of Policing and Guarding, Southwick Park, Fareham. On completion, successful candidates are placed onto a merit board awaiting full-time employment as an SIB Investigator. Passing the SCIC does not automatically qualify candidates employment with the SIB, and all candidates who were successful in passing the SCIC but unsuitable for employment with the SIB will be returned to their respective unit as a Level 3 trained investigator.

== Royal Air Force Police SIB ==
The Royal Air Force Police Special Investigation Branch, formed in 1918, had the distinction of being the only branch-specific investigative unit entrusted with a major war crime. Five officers and fourteen NCOs were given the assignment of investigating the Stalag Luft III murders immediately following the Second World War. In direct recognition of this, the RAF Police SIB was granted permission to use The Great Escape March as its distinct march by CAS in 2015.

The Royal Air Force Police previously had one SIB Squadron based at RAF Halton with two subordinate Flights: SIB A Flt based at RAF Halton, and SIB B Flt based at RAF College Cranwell, this Squadron sits within No. 1 Specialist Police Wing.

Personnel undertook the Serious Crime Investigation Course (SCIC) before going on to complete a number of Home Office courses such as SOIT, National drugs, and Tier 2,3 & 5 interviewer, Family Liaison Officer, Specialist Fraud etc.

The RAF Police SIB differed slightly from its RMP counterparts in terms of rank structure, employing a mix of Corporals and Sergeants. Both SIB(S) and SIB(N) additionally employ a number of Acting Corporals.

SIB personnel extensively deployed with their RMP SIB counterparts throughout the duration of Operation Banner, Northern Ireland; Operation Telic, Iraq; and Operation Herrick, Afghanistan in support of combat operations.

Her Majesty's Inspectorate of Constabulary conducted an inspection of the SIB in 2009.

== Disbandment and replacement ==
In 2017 a Service Justice System review commenced that evaluated the current Service Justice System, and identify ways the system could be improved, led by retired senior Crown Court judge Shaun Lyons. The second report from this review, Service Justice System Policing evaluated the special police organizations, which included special investigation bureaus.

The report identified the three individual SIBs as being inefficient and actually interfering with investigations, with skill and experience issues and "overlap of function, duplication of effort, poor intelligence flows and an absence of skill transfer". The report turned to a similar issue that had been identified in the early 2000s where individual civilian police forces were increasingly unable to cope with increasingly complex and international organized crime investigations. The solution was setting up Regional Organised Crime Units that united personnel and resources, that better facilitated improvements in investigations and the flow of intelligence between units.

Recommendation 2. A Tri-Service Defence Serious Crime Unit (DSCU) is created following the civilian police Regional Organised Crime Unit (ROCU) model.

Recommendation 3. The three existing Special Investigations Bureau (SIB) be brigaded into the DSCU together with all current specialist investigative support — intelligence, undercover, surveillance, digital units, forensic and scenes of crime.

Recommendation 4. SP personnel are seconded into the unit and should retain their individual SP [service police] identity.

— Professor Sir Jon Murphy, Service Justice System Policing Review (Part 1) (2018)

In December 2022, the Defence Serious Crime Unit was formed to replace the three separate strands of single service SIBs. It is headquartered at Southwick Park, and comprises personnel from all three services. Its remit is to investigate serious crimes outside of the normal chain of command.

== See also ==
- Redcap (1960s ITV series)
- Red Cap (2000s BBC series)
- Cormoran Strike (fictional private detective and ex-Army SIB)
