= Defence School of Policing, Security and Guarding =

Coordinates: 50°52′29″N 1°06′05″W

- Active: 2005 (as Defence College of Policing and Guarding) – present
- Country: United Kingdom
- Branch: British Army; Royal Air Force; Royal Navy
- Type: Defence training school
- Role: Service police, guarding and security training
- Part of: Defence College of Support
- Location: Southwick House, Hampshire

The Defence School of Policing, Security and Guarding is the training centre for the Service Police of the British Armed Forces including the Ministry of Defence. It consolidates training for the Royal Navy Police, Royal Military Police and Royal Air Force Police and the Ministry of Defence Police in one location, assuring consistent standards across the services. The centre was established at Southwick Park, near Portsmouth, Hampshire, in 2005.

== History ==
The Defence College of Policing and Guarding was opened in 2005 at Southwick House, the former site of HMS Dryad. The regimental headquarters of the Royal Military Police moved to the site following withdrawal from Roussillon Barracks, Chichester. RAF Police training moved from RAF Halton in 2005. Royal Navy Police training moved from HMS Excellent in November 2005.

Sometime prior to 2015, the name of the establishment changed to replace "College" with "School".

== Military police training ==
The facilities allow training in most aspects of policing, including Crime Scene Investigation.

=== Royal Military Police ===
Soldiers entering the Royal Military Police are posted to the school having completed Phase 1 training at the Army Training Centre Pirbright. Successful completion results in promotion to lance corporal and posting to an operational unit as a probationer. Officers for the Royal Military Police undertake training on completion of commissioning courses at Royal Military Academy Sandhurst.

=== Royal Air Force Police ===
Aviators (previously known as Airmen and Airwomen) are posted to the School having completed Phase 1 training at RAF Halton. Successful completion results in the individual being promoted to Corporal and being posted to an operational unit. Officers of the Royal Air Force Police undertake training on completion of commissioning at Royal Air Force College Cranwell.

=== Royal Navy Police ===
Traditionally, Royal Navy and Royal Marines candidates are not recruited directly but are transferred from other branches within the Naval Service where they have qualified for promotion to corporal or leading hand before being posted to the school, having completed a 4-week suitability assessment. Since 2018, a Direct Entry pathway has been implemented which allows Royal Navy candidates to be recruited directly in to the branch. On completion of training, successful trainees will be promoted to the rank of Leading Hand and are posted to an operational unit. Officers for the Royal Navy Police are drawn from the rating corps as senior upper yardmen and are commissioned following training at Britannia Royal Naval College or Commando Training Centre Royal Marines.

=== Ministry of Defence Police ===
All new recruits are required to successfully qualify as an Authorised Firearms Officer (AFO) as part of their initial training. MDP officers are trained to National Police Standards and must maintain their firearms qualifications by completing refresher training on an annual basis. Officers spend the first 12 weeks of training at the Defence School of Policing and Security (DSPS), Southwick Park, Hampshire and then 8 weeks carrying out firearms training at one of the regional hubs, with sessions split between the classroom, tactical training area and firearms ranges.
