= Defence Serious Crime Unit =

Military unit of the United Kingdom

- Founded: 5 December 2022
- Country: United Kingdom
- Branch: Royal Navy; British Army; Royal Air Force
- Type: Defence investigative unit
- Role: Service criminal investigations
- Garrison/HQ: Campion Lines, Bulford Garrison

Commanders
- Current commander: Brig Kris Rotchell

The Defence Serious Crime Unit (DSCU), is a military unit within the Defence Crime Command which investigates alleged crimes and criminal activity involving personnel subject to Service law in the United Kingdom, or those in the UK military serving abroad. The unit replaces the three Special Investigation Branches of the UK armed services (the Royal Navy, the British Army, and the Royal Air Force).

== Background ==
In 2017, a Service Justice System (SJS) review was enacted, led by Shaun Lyons and Jon Murphy. One of the report's recommendations was that a Defence Serious Crime Unit be formed from personnel drawn from all three service strands within the UK military framework.

Recommendation 2
A tri-Service Defence Serious Crime Unit (DSCU) is created following the civilian police Regional Organised Crime Unit (ROCU) model.

Recommendation 3
The three existing Special Investigations Bureau (SIB) be brigaded into the DSCU together with all current specialist investigative support - intelligence, undercover, surveillance, digital units, forensic and scenes of crime.

Recommendation 4
SP [service police] personnel are seconded into the unit and should retain their individual SP identity.

In October 2020, Ben Wallace MP further enacted a second report by Richard Henriques which agreed wholeheartedly with the SJS review in the setting up of the DCSU. This report was delivered in October 2021. The service criminal inquiry process had attracted some criticism as it was deemed to have not effectively investigated criminal activity, particularly the most serious crimes of rape, manslaughter and murder. The Centre for Military Justice maintains that such serious crimes as these (and the crime of sexual assault by penetration), should be investigated by civilian police forces. Up until 2006, these crimes were tried in the civilian courts, however, this was amended in 2006 so that service police could investigate crimes that had historically occurred abroad (when service personnel were on active duty) which the civilian courts could not legally prosecute.

One of the accusations about Service Police was that they were/are not able to handle complex investigations, particularly serious offences. In 2012, the body of a Kenyan woman was found in septic tank three months after she had disappeared. It is alleged that a British soldier killed her after she was seen out partying with soldiers based near Nanyuki. A request by the Kenyan police to the Royal Military Police (RMP) to collect DNA samples from all the soldiers in the hotel on the night of Agnes Wanjiru's disappearance was not acted upon. The Sunday Times stated that the RMP is not fit for purpose. "It is one thing to break up bar brawls between soldiers and locals, but investigating murders and collecting forensic evidence is beyond its limited capabilities."

== Role ==
Ben Wallace MP described the formation of the new unit as "... a step change to improving the quality and capability of the armed forces to investigate serious crimes. Fully independent, it will create a critical mass of experience and personnel to ensure our investigations are thorough, high quality and timely." The "fully independent" that Wallace states is that investigations will be outside of the alleged victims' chain of command. The DSCU will utilise the specialist skills and resources of all three services in one unit. In November 2021, when some of the recommendations from the Henriques report were taken forward, it was stated that the DSCU would have military commander who was "hierarchically, institutionally and practically" independent of the chain of command and of those whom it investigated.

All staff on the new unit will be trained to deal with sexual offences, with some being trained in special investigations procedures, family liaison and specialist interviewing techniques at the College of Policing. The DCSU will be a tri-service unit under the command of a newly appointed provost-marshal. Legislation dictates a "Tri-service serious crimes unit" being formed on 5 December 2022.

== See also ==
- Ministry of Defence Police
- Royal Navy Police
- Royal Military Police
- Royal Air Force Police
- Special Investigation Branch
