= Government of the British Indian Ocean Territory =

The British Indian Ocean Territory is an overseas territory of the United Kingdom. It is administered by a Commissioner, located at the Foreign and Commonwealth Office in London. There is no Governor appointed to represent the King in the territory as there are no permanent inhabitants (as is also the case in South Georgia and the South Sandwich Islands and the British Antarctic Territory).

== Constitution ==
The laws of the territory are based on the constitution, currently set out in the British Indian Ocean Territory (Constitution) Order 2004. The Order allows for:

- the appointment of the Commissioner by the King (Article 4);
- appointments to other offices by the Commissioner (Article 7);
- no right of abode in the territory (Article 9);
- the Commissioner's power to make laws for the territory's peace, order and good government (Article 10);
- the disallowance of laws made by Commissioner by the Secretary of State for Foreign and Commonwealth Affairs (Article 11);
- the Commissioner's powers of pardon (Article 12); and
- the operation of the courts (Article 13).

If the Commissioner has not made a law on a particular topic then, in most circumstances, the laws that apply in the territory are the same as those that apply in England and Wales under the terms of the Courts Ordinance 1983. As almost all residents of the BIOT are members of the United States military, however, in practice crimes are more commonly charged under United States military law.

Legislation is formally published in the BIOT Gazette, but this is not widely distributed.

== Executive ==
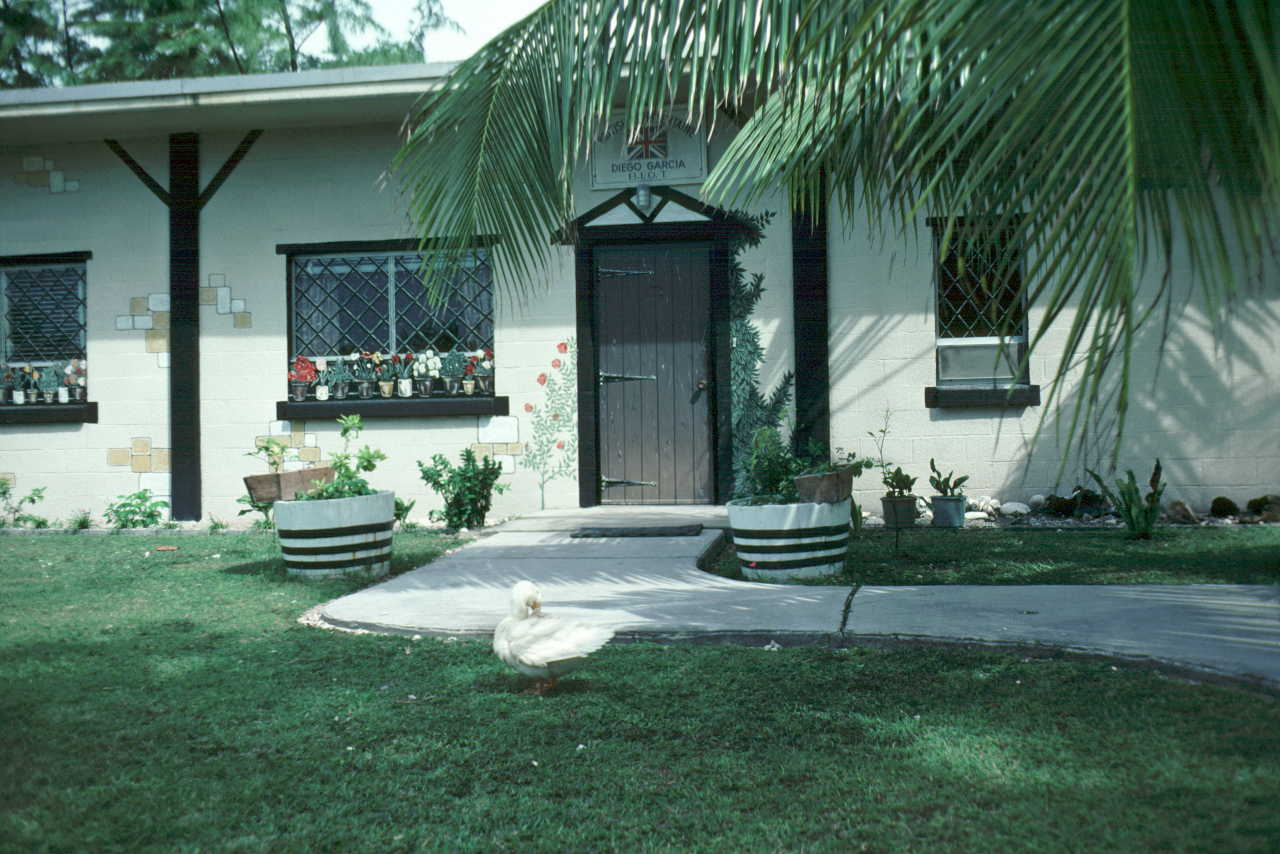
Home of the British Representative in the territory.

The territory was formally acquired by the United Kingdom under the Treaty of Paris in 1814 and subsequently formed part of the British colony of Mauritius until its detachment as a separate territory in 1965. The head of state is Charles III, King of the United Kingdom.

The Commissioner is currently Nishi Dholakia. He followed Paul Candler, who was also Director of Overseas Territories in the Foreign and Commonwealth Office and Commissioner of the British Antarctic Territory; the Administrator is Mike Vidler. The Commissioner's Representative in the territory is the officer commanding the detachment of British forces (known locally as “BritRep”), currently Commander Andy Williams.

There is no legislature (or elections) in the territory as there are no permanent inhabitants.

== Judiciary ==
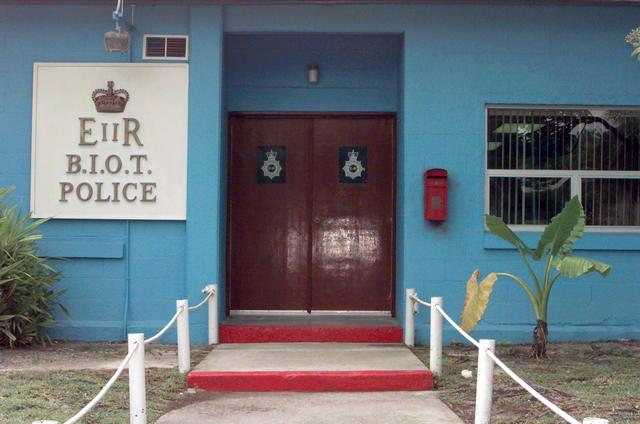
BIOT police station

BIOT has a full and independent administration of civil and criminal justice, with a Magistrates Court, Supreme Court and Court of Appeal. Further appeals can be heard by the Judicial Committee of the Privy Council, located in London. The following persons have served as the territory's Chief Justice, overseeing a small legal system for the jurisdiction: Sir John Farley Spry (1981-1987); Sir John Fieldsend (1987–1998); Christopher Gardner (c. 2007); Simon Bryan (since 2015); and James Lewis.

On 5 May 2023, the Supreme Court of the British Indian Ocean Territory ruled that there is a right in certain circumstances to legal aid for both civil and criminal matters on BIOT, based on a local adaption of the Legal Aid, Sentencing and Punishment of Offenders Act 2012.

Capital punishment is prohibited under the domestic law of the territory. While United States military law (which does provide for capital punishment) applies for most BIOT residents, the 1966 exchange of notes which initially established the governance of the territory states: "A death sentence shall not be carried out in the Territory by the military authorities of the United States."

== US military presence ==
Applicable treaties between the United Kingdom and the United States of America govern the use of the military base. The first exchange of notes, signed on 30 December 1966, constituted an agreement concerning the availability for defence purposes of the British Indian Ocean Territory. This was followed by agreements on the construction of a communications facility (1972), naval support facility (1976), construction contracts (1987), and monitoring facility (1999).

== See also ==
- Chagossian Government
