= Military police of the United Kingdom =

Three UK military police services

UK Military Police patch/badge worn by the police of all three services on combat uniforms

In the United Kingdom, the term military police refers to the three branches of service police, responsible for policing armed forces personnel. The Royal Military Police polices the British Army, the Royal Navy Police polices the Royal Navy, and the Royal Air Force Police polices the Royal Air Force.

There are also a number of civilian police forces whose role is to police parts of the Defence Estate, in the UK and overseas, such as the Ministry of Defence Police, but such forces are not considered military police.

== Service police ==
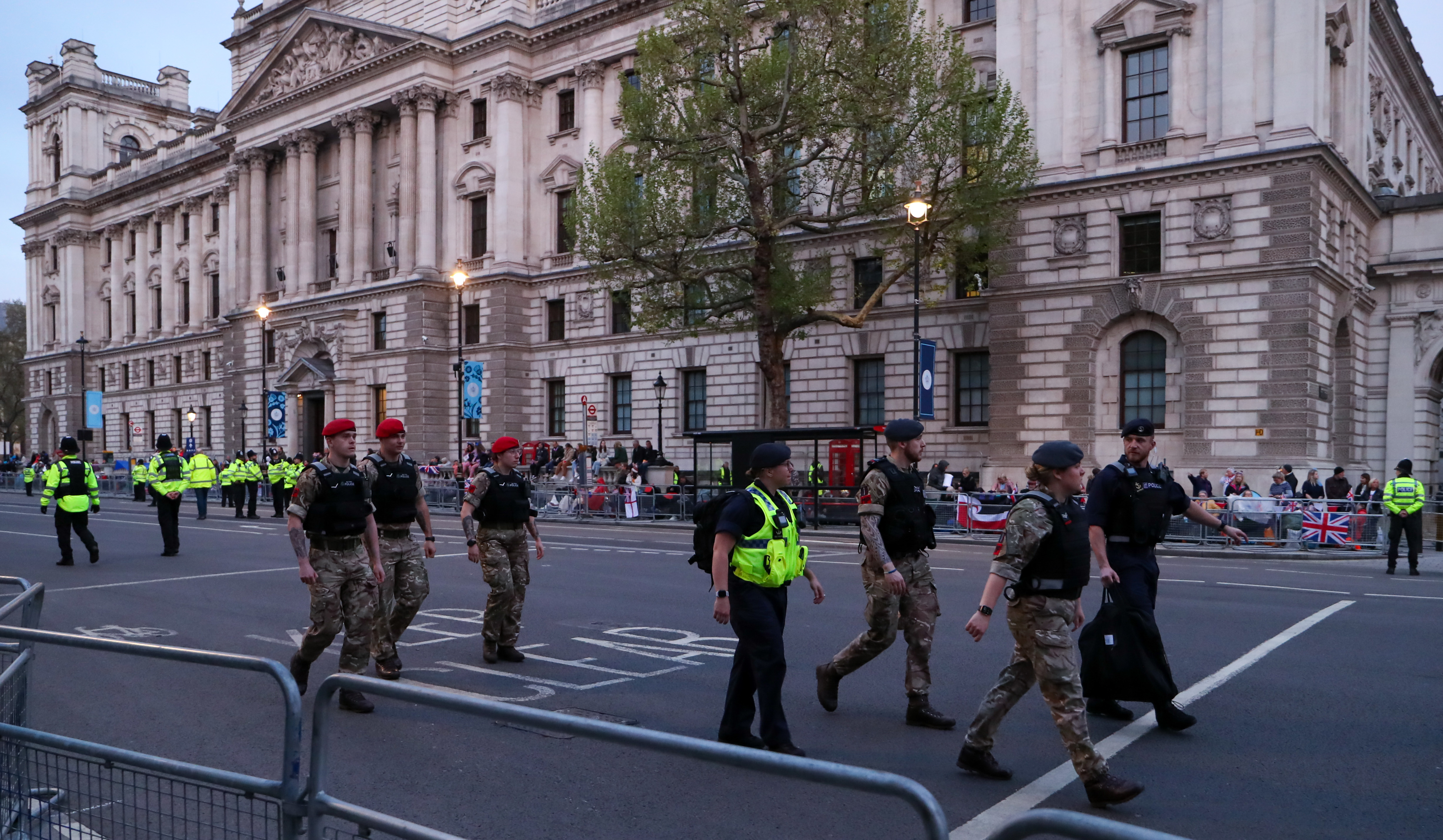
Multiple people from each of the British service police formations

In the UK, service police are the formations of the British Armed Forces responsible for policing armed forces personnel. Each of the services has its own service police branch, a standalone unit responsible for policing, close protection of VIPs and, in the case of the Royal Military Police and Royal Air Force Police, other matters such as traffic control.

- The Royal Navy is policed by the Royal Navy Police, members of which are traditionally referred to as Regulators (or Master-at-Arms if a Chief Petty Officer or Warrant Officer).
  - The Royal Navy Police also has Royal Marines specialising as Service Policemen. Prior to 2009, the Royal Marines Police was an independent organisation within the Corps of Royal Marines.
- The British Army is policed by the Royal Military Police.
- The Royal Air Force is policed by the Royal Air Force Police who are responsible not only for the policing of service personnel, but also a number of specialist security roles such as Counter Intelligence, physical security, cybersecurity and information security and Police Dogs.

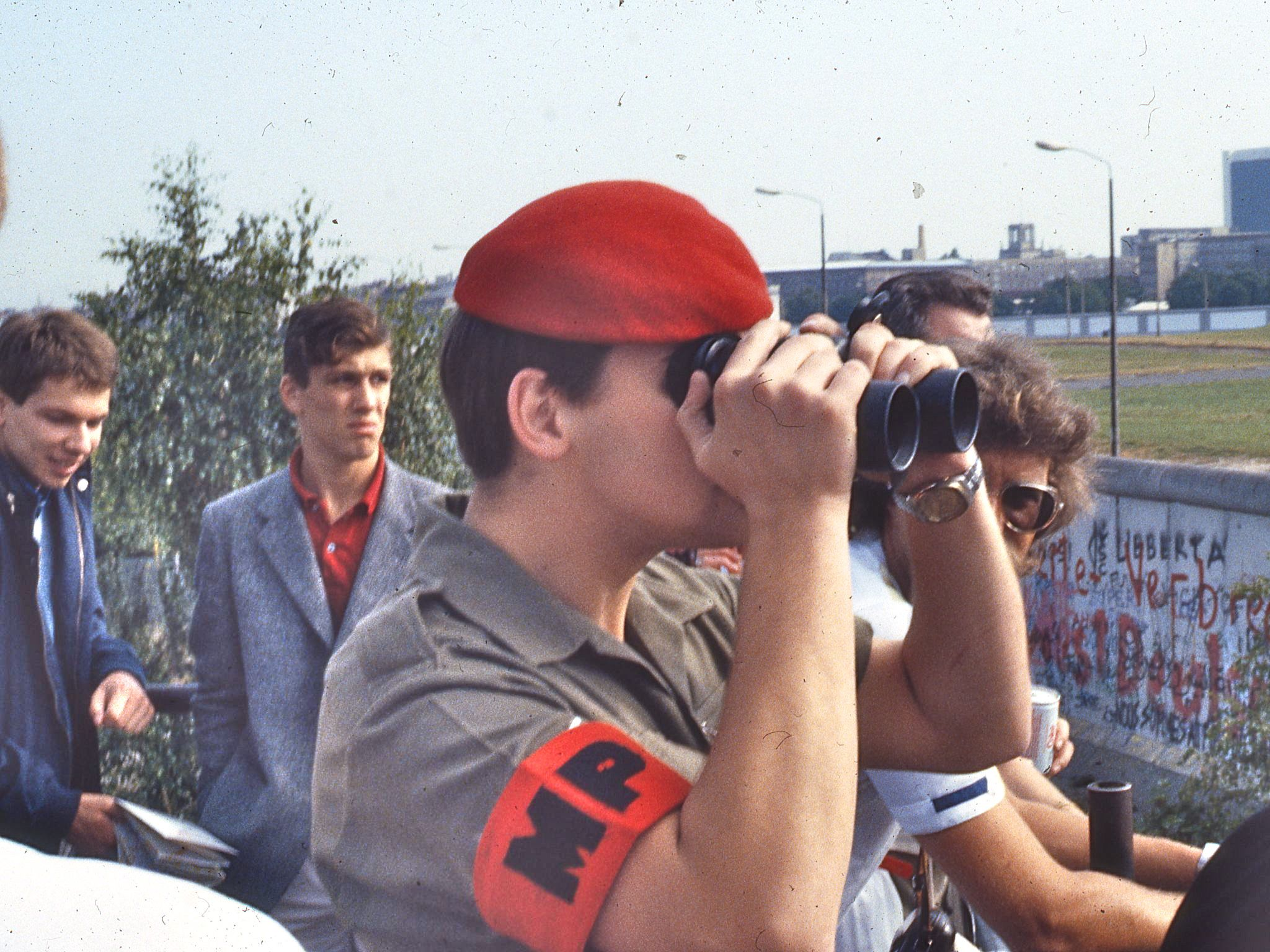
British military police member using field glasses to look across the Berlin Wall from a viewing platform on the western side, 1984

The Special Investigation Branch is the name given to the detective branches of all three Service police arms: the Royal Navy Police, Royal Military Police and Royal Air Force Police. In December 2022 the separate SIBs were amalgamated into a single joint service unit called Defence Serious Crime Unit (DSCU).

== Civilian police forces ==
There are several civil police forces responsible to the Ministry of Defence. They each have specific roles and are staffed by police officers who are not part of the armed forces and have the powers of a constable.

- The Ministry of Defence Police is the UK-based civilian police force of the Ministry of Defence. It is responsible for providing police, investigative and guarding services to Ministry of Defence property, personnel, and the Defence estate throughout the United Kingdom.
- The Sovereign Base Areas Police provide policing services for both the Eastern and Western Sovereign Base Areas of Cyprus.
- The Gibraltar Defence Police provide policing services on Ministry of Defence land and waters in Gibraltar.

== See also ==
- Military police vehicle#United Kingdom
