= Royal Military Police =

Military police of the British Army

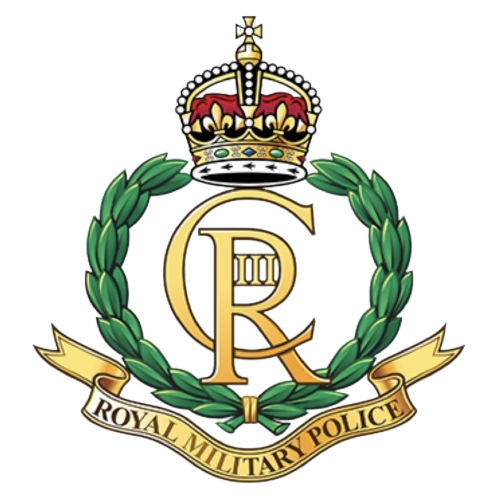
- Badge of the RMP
- Active: 1926–1992 (independent corps); 1992–present (as branch of AGC)
- Country: United Kingdom
- Branch: British Army
- Type: Service police
- Size: 2,500
- Part of: Adjutant General's Corps
- RHQ RMP: Southwick Park, Hampshire
- Nicknames: Redcaps; Monkeys (derogatory)
- Mottos: Exemplo Ducemus; By example shall we lead
- Beret: Red
- March: The Watchtower (Hoch Heidecksburg)
- Website: www.army.mod.uk/who-we-are/corps-regiments-and-units/adjutant-generals-corps/provost/royal-military-police/

Commanders
- Colonel-in-Chief: King Charles III
- Colonel Commandant: Lieutenant General Sir Benjamin Bathurst
- Provost Marshal: Brigadier Sarah Pringle-Smith
- RMP Reserve Hon Col: Professor David Whetham

Insignia
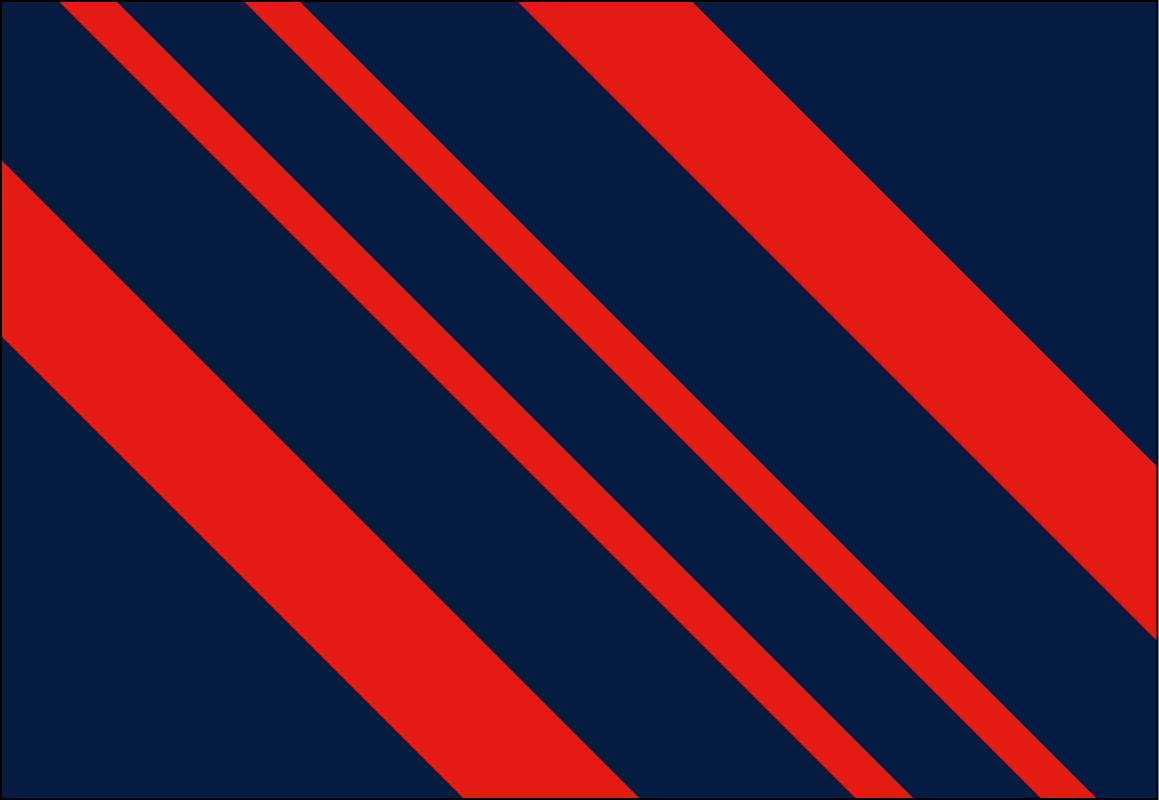
- Heraldic Background

- Tactical Recognition Flash

The Royal Military Police (RMP) is the branch of the British Army responsible for the policing of army service personnel, and for providing a military police presence both in the UK and while service personnel are deployed overseas on operations and exercises. Members of the RMP are often known as 'Redcaps' because of the scarlet covers on their peaked caps and scarlet coloured berets.

The RMP's origins can be traced back to the 13th century but it was not until 1877 that a regular corps of military police was formed with the creation of the Military Mounted Police (MMP), which was followed by the Military Foot Police (MFP) in 1885. Although technically two independent corps, they effectively functioned as a single organisation. In 1926, they were fully amalgamated to form the Corps of Military Police (CMP). In recognition of their service in the Second World War, they became the Corps of Royal Military Police (RMP) on 28 November 1946. In 1992, the RMP amalgamated into the Adjutant General's Corps (AGC), where they form part of the AGC's Provost Branch.

Non-commissioned members of the RMP receive their basic training as soldiers at the Army Training Centre in Pirbright. They then receive further training at the Defence School of Policing and Guarding (DSPG), previously known as the Defence College of Policing and Guarding (DCPG).

The regimental march of the RMP is "The Watchtower" or "Hoch Heidecksburg", originally a German Army marching tune from 1912 by Rudolf Herzer. The RMP motto is Exemplo ducemus, Latin for "By example shall we lead".

== History ==
The Provost Marshal is a post which goes back to the 13th century and was originally an under-officer of the Earl Marshal. In 1685 the role of Provost Marshal General became a permanent post. The Cavalry Staff Corps of 1813–14 and 1815–18 is regarded as Britain's first standing military police force and a forerunner of the Royal Military Police. The Military Mounted Police was formed in 1877 and the Military Foot Police was formed in 1885.

During the First World War the Military Police grew from 508 all ranks to over 25,000 all ranks by the end of the War. During the Battle of Neuve Chapelle in March 1915 the Military Police served the Army as a whole, rather than individual units.

On 27 February 1926 the Corps of Military Police was formed by merging the Military Mounted Police and the Military Foot Police.

During the Second World War the Military Police grew from 4,121 all ranks to over 50,000 all ranks within six major branches of specialists:

- Special Investigation Branch – formed in 1940, with 19 detectives from the Metropolitan Police transferred to the Army for deployment in France. From this small beginning the Branch expanded into numerous Sections which were deployed both in the UK and overseas, providing the Corps with its own Criminal Investigation Department to conduct more detailed and protracted investigations into organised crime and serious offences such as murder.
- Provost Wing – responsible for general policing. Provost Companies were included in the order of battle of Home Commands, Armoured, Infantry and Airborne Divisions, as well as at Army and Corps level and with independent Brigades. From 1942, "Ports Provost" Companies were raised, consisting of a mix of Provost and Vulnerable Points Sections, which were deployed on security and policing duties within ports and docks.
- Vulnerable Points Wing – formed in 1941 to provide security of static locations and establishments. They were known as "blue caps" from the Oxford blue cloth covers worn on their service dress caps. Originally intended to act as static Companies and detachments, VP Coys were later deployed in North West Europe, guarding prisoner of war camps and other static installations. The VP Wing was quickly phased out at the end of the war, but re-appeared briefly in the Supplementary Reserve/Army Emergency Reserve between 1950 and 1961.
- Traffic Control Wing – formed in 1941, TC Coys were deployed throughout the United Kingdom, releasing Provost Companies from the tasks of traffic control. TC Coys were later deployed in the Middle East, Italy and North-West Europe. The Wing was phased out of the Corps by 1946.
- Field Security Wing – formed in 1937. Personnel wore Lincoln green cap covers, green brassards and brass shoulder titles on their tunics with the letters "FSP", to distinguish them from the rest of the Corps. They wore the standard CMP cap badge, but unofficially ground down the wording "MILITARY POLICE" from the lower scroll of the badge. In July 1940 the Wing was absorbed into the new Intelligence Corps.

In November 1946, King George VI granted the 'Royal' prefix to the Corps of Military Police in recognition of its outstanding record in two World Wars and the Corps became known as The Corps of Royal Military Police, though abbreviated to Royal Military Police (RMP). From 1969 the Corps made an important contribution during The Troubles in Northern Ireland.

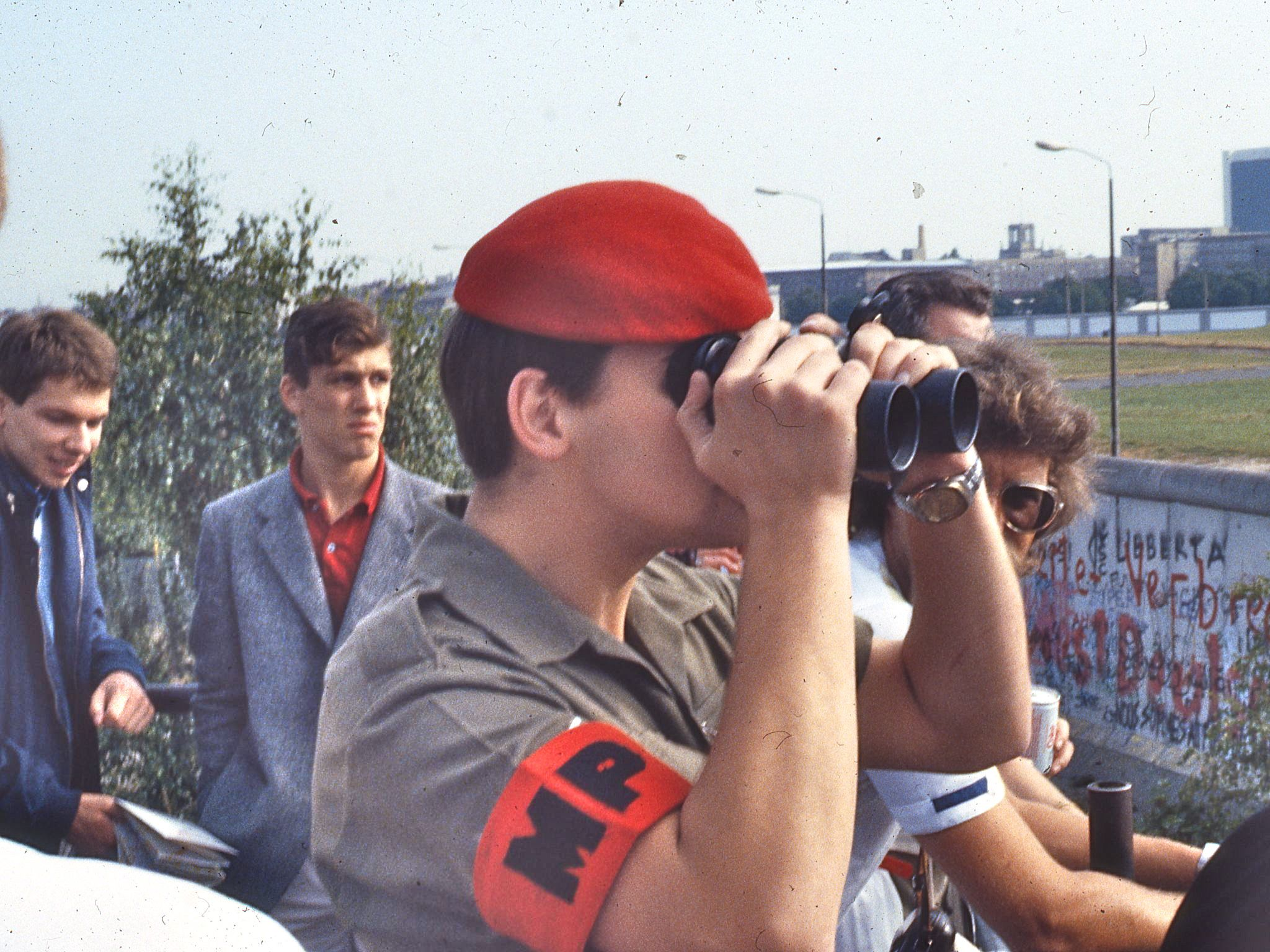
A Royal Military Police member uses field glasses to look across the Berlin Wall from a viewing platform on the western side, 1984.

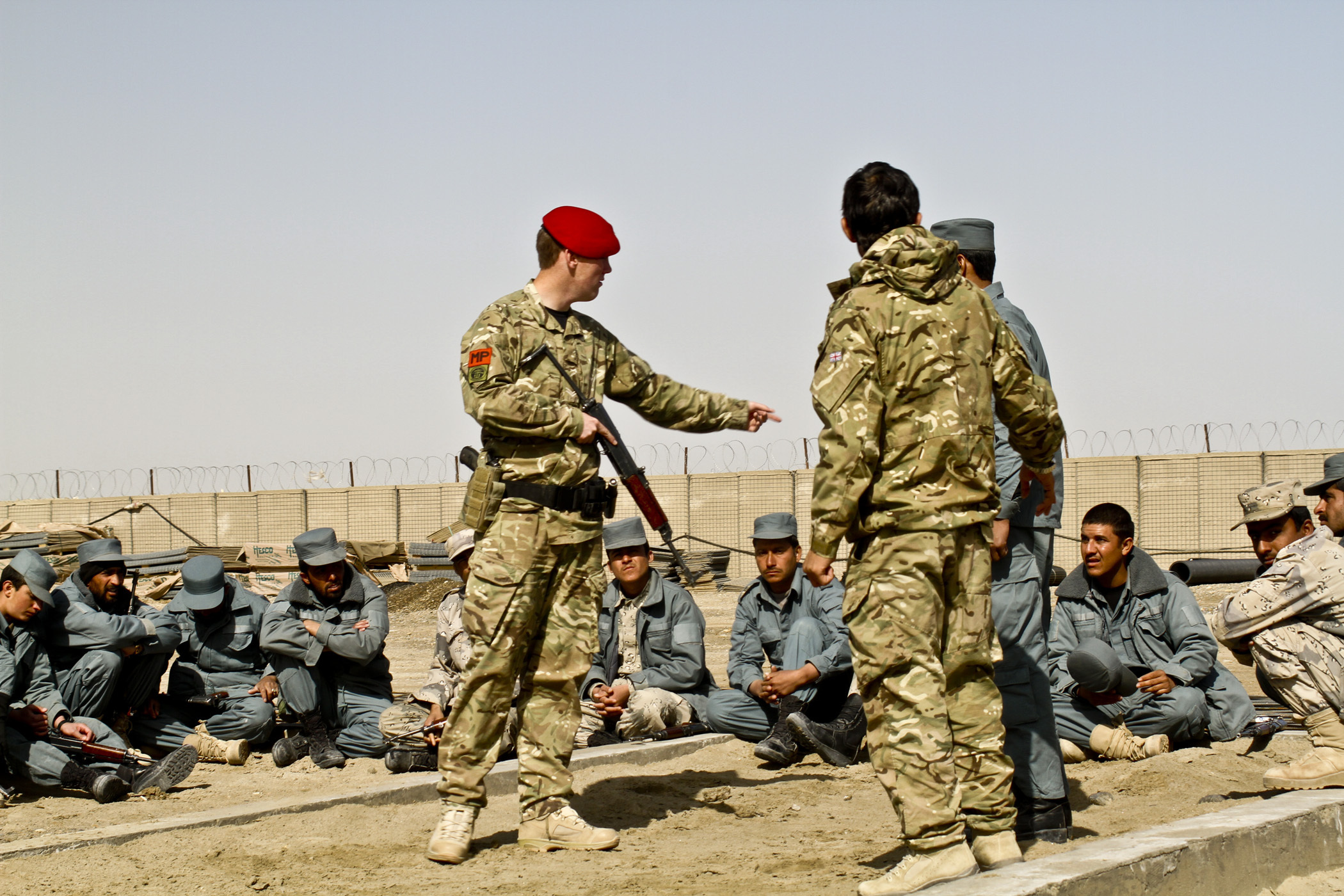
An RMP member during Operation Herrick in Afghanistan, in 2012.

A horse detachment of the Royal Military Police remained in service after World War II, being recreated in 1950. Based at Aldershot, its purpose was mainly to undertake patrol and other policing duties in areas not suitable for vehicles, but also to act as a ceremonial unit preserving mounted RMP traditions dating back to the nineteenth century. The Mounted Troop was gradually reduced to about 20 personnel and finally disbanded in 1995.

On 6 April 1992 the RMP amalgamated into the Adjutant General's Corps (AGC), under whose overall command they form part of the AGC's Provost Branch alongside the also pre-existent Military Provost Staff Corps and the later-formed Military Provost Guard Service. Although they lost status as an independent corps, they were permitted to retain the Royal Military Police title, cap badge and red-topped cap/red beret. Their solid red regimental stable belt was reintroduced in 2024, having previously been replaced by the AGC stable belt.

== Role ==
As well as policing service personnel whilst at home in the UK, the Royal Military Police are required to provide a capable military police presence in support of military operations overseas.

=== In the United Kingdom and British overseas garrisons ===
Broadly speaking, within the United Kingdom and its overseas garrisons, the Royal Military Police are responsible for policing service personnel. In garrison towns, the RMP often assist the local territorial police force in town centres at venues where service personnel are likely to frequent. Some Royal Military Police NCOs are allocated roles working on Service Family Accommodation (SFA) estates, such as Community Liaison Officers and Crime Reduction Officers. Part of this role involves visiting schools in the SFA catchment area, where the school's children come from service families. In the UK, this work is often done in conjunction with the Ministry of Defence Police.

Some of the specific roles the RMP fulfill include:

- Law enforcement and crime prevention, within the service community
- Assistance to civilian police forces in garrison towns

=== When deployed on operations ===
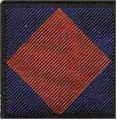
RMP Para Provost DZ Flash (16 Air Assault Brigade)

The Royal Military Police are required to provide tactical military police support to the British Army in military operations. When deployed, some of the roles the RMP fulfill include:

- War crime investigations
- Handling and collating criminal evidence
- Reconnaissance patrols
- Detainee handling
- Search operations
- General policing duties within operational bases
- Foreign police and military training
- Provide close protection operatives for senior military and diplomatic personnel on operations

== Jurisdiction ==
=== In the United Kingdom ===
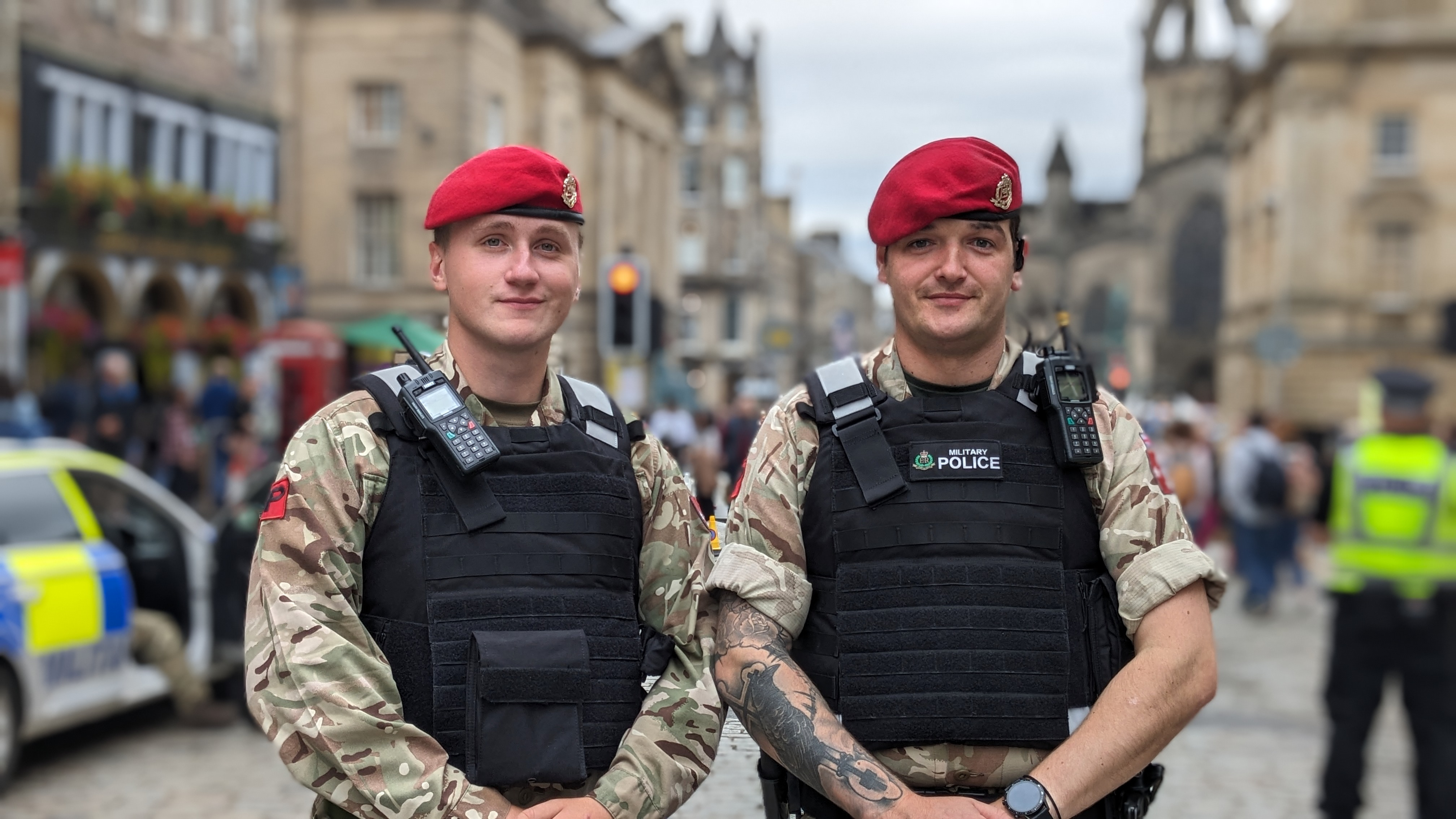
Royal Military Police soldiers at Edinburgh

Royal Military Police personnel are not constables under UK law and do not have any specific police powers over the general public, only whilst dealing with service personnel. The RMP are subject to inspection by HM Inspectorate of Constabulary, in the same way as UK civilian police forces.

RMP personnel sometimes have powers, conferred by military lands byelaws, to give lawful directions to civilians who are on Ministry of Defence land affected by such byelaws. This may include the power to regulate vehicular and pedestrian traffic, close or restrict access, or to direct civilians to leave military land to which the byelaws apply. The particulars of these powers are highly changeable and are determined by each individual statutory instrument.

A member of the Royal Military Police can arrest any individual in the UK whom they have reasonable grounds to believe to be a serving member of the British Armed Forces and to have committed a relevant civil or military law offence. RMP personnel do not have to be on Ministry of Defence land to exercise their authority over service personnel. The RMP also have police powers over personnel of the other two branches of the armed forces: the Royal Navy and the Royal Air Force. The Royal Navy Police and RAF Police also have reciprocal police powers over British Army personnel.

=== Postings overseas ===
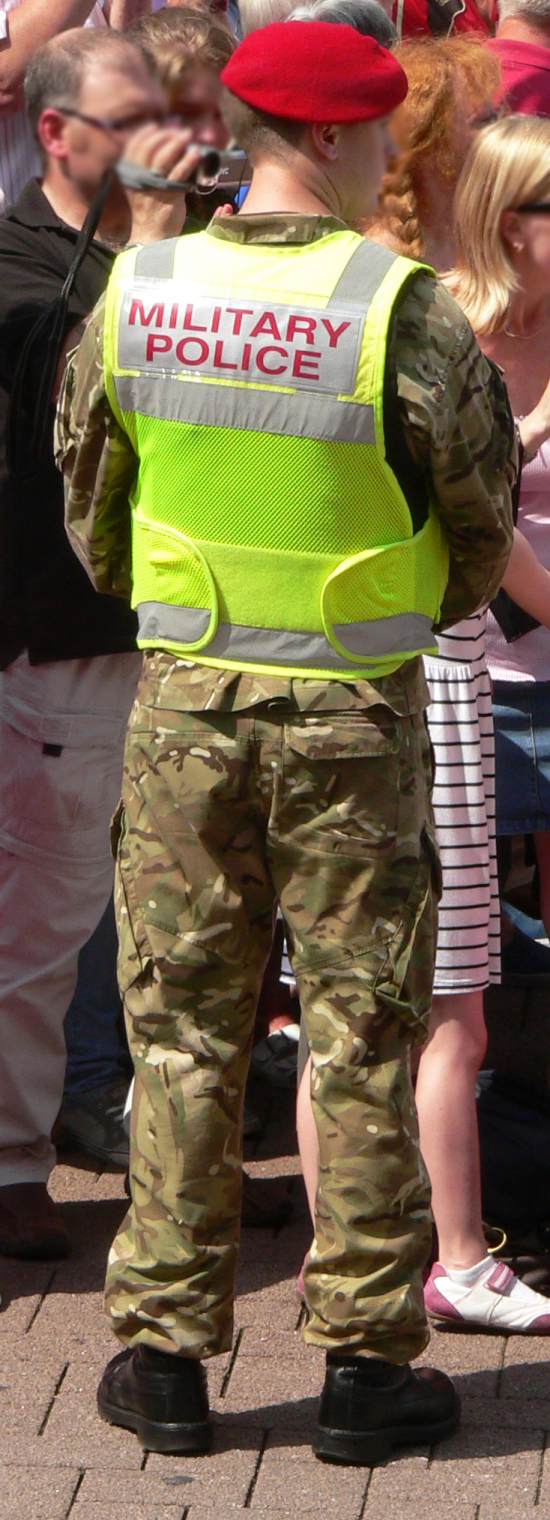
RMP soldier on duty in Germany

Where service personnel are deployed overseas, the Royal Military Police are often called upon to provide a complete policing service. In these situations, members of the Royal Military Police can often exercise police powers in respect of civilians subject to service discipline. This includes, not exclusively, service dependents and overseas contractors sponsored by the British Army.

In Germany, under the Status of forces agreement, the RMP has jurisdiction and primacy over British service personnel, their families, MoD contractors, and NAAFI staff. The German civil police only normally become involved where the interests of a German national are concerned.

== Equipment ==
Royal Military Police personnel undertaking general police duties are equipped with extendable batons, Hiatt speedcuffs and Airwave personal radios.

The RMP also uses the Home Office Large Major Enquiry System, known as HOLMES.

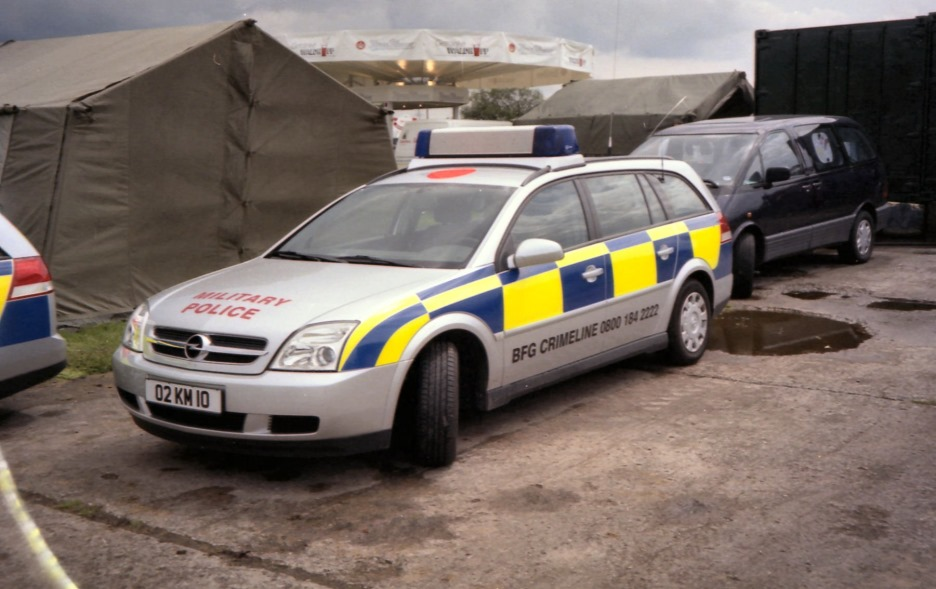
Royal Military Police Opel Vectra patrol car in Germany

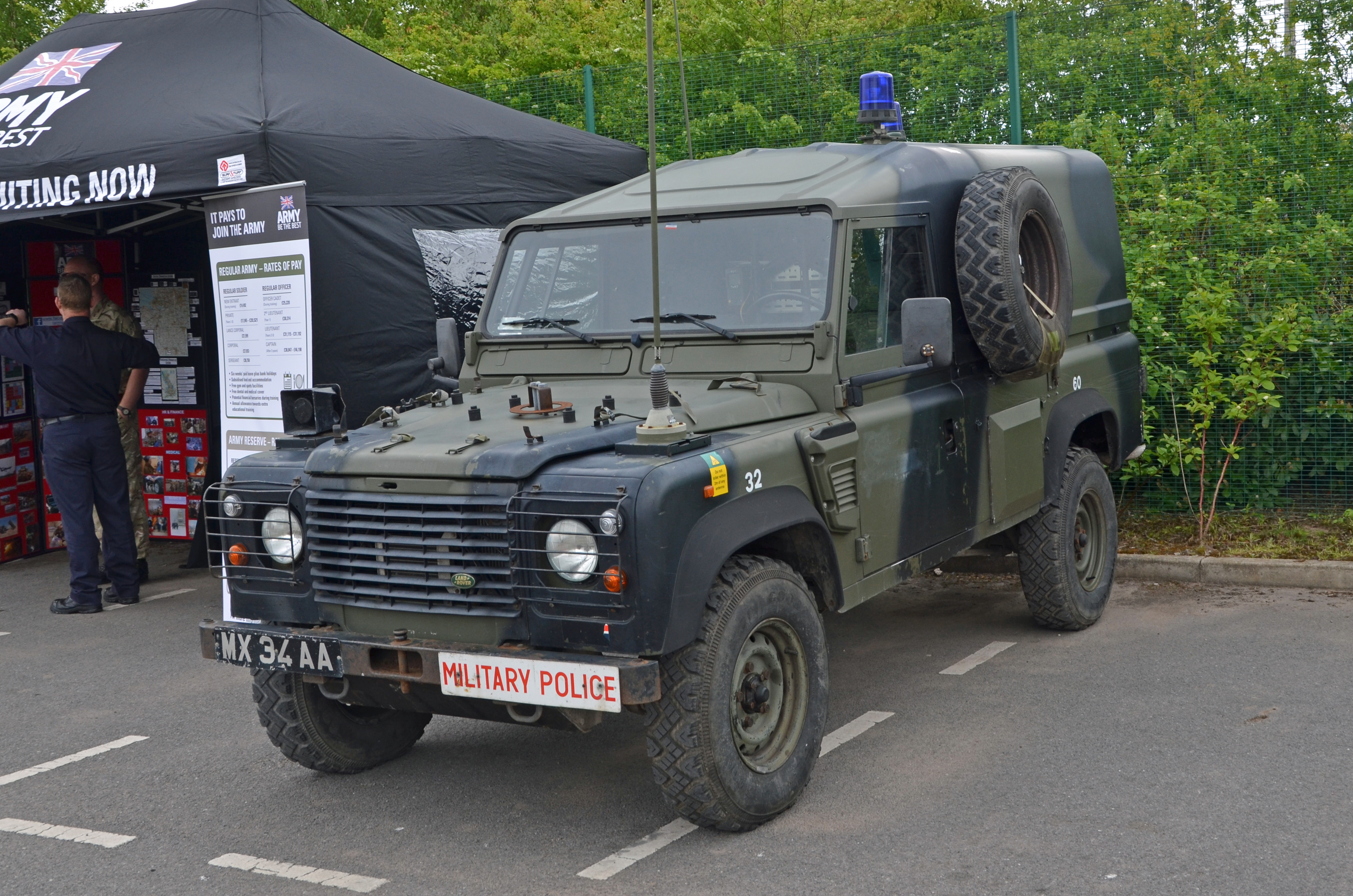
Royal Military Police Land Rover Defender

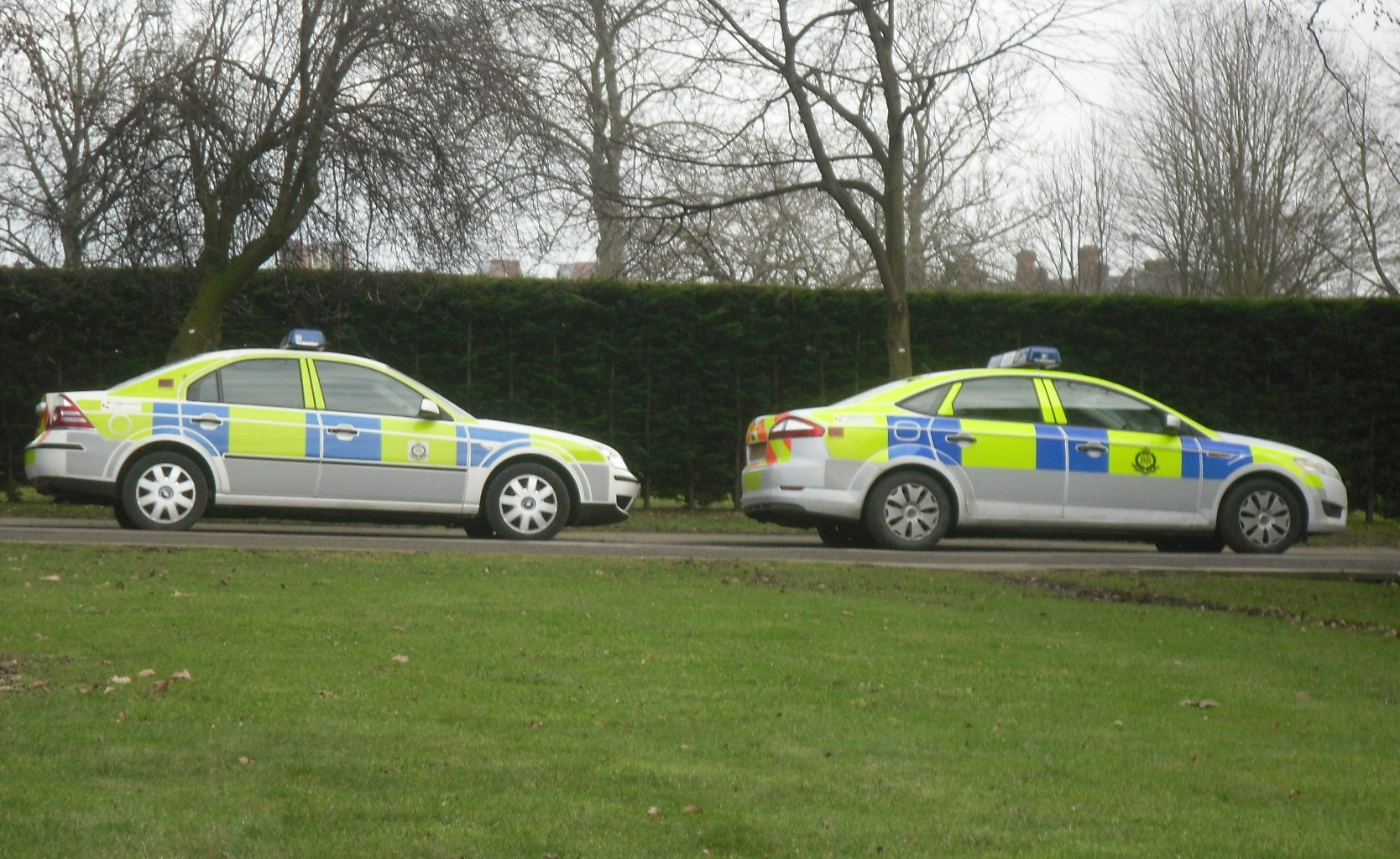
Royal Military Police Ford Mondeos, 2010

== Training ==
RMP commissioned officers attend the Royal Military Academy Sandhurst, as do all other British Army officers. Other ranks recruits undertake their phase 1, Common Military Syllabus (Recruits) training at the Army Training Regiment in Winchester. They then move onto Phase 2 which is undertaken at the Defence School of Policing and Guarding.

The training syllabus includes:

- Service Police Codes Of Practice (SPCOP), military legislation which shadows Police and Criminal Evidence Act 1984 (PACE)
- Armed Forces Act 2006 (also Status of Forces in NATO)
- Serious Organised Crime and Police Act 2005 (SOCPA 2005)
- Geneva Conventions
- HAIG Rules
- Personal Safety Training (PST)

== Organisation ==
The regimental headquarters of the RMP moved to MOD Southwick Park - Southwick House - near Portsmouth, in February 2007. It is co-located with the triservice Defence School of Policing and Guarding. The RMP training centre moved there on 27 September 2005, from the RMP's long-standing RHQ (with effect from February, 1964) at Roussillon Barracks in Chichester, West Sussex. The Service Police Crime Bureau is also located at MOD Southwick Park, and is staffed by personnel from the Royal Military Police, Royal Air Force Police, and Royal Navy Police. The RMP Museum has also moved to MOD Southwick Park.

== Colonels Commandant of the RMP ==
Colonels Commandant have included:

- General Sir Miles Dempsey (1947–1957)
- Field Marshal Sir James Cassels (1957–1968)
- Field Marshal Sir Geoffrey Baker (1968–1971)
- General Sir Cecil Blacker (1971–1976)
- General Sir Peter Leng (1976–1983)
- General Sir James Glover (1983–1987)
- Field Marshal Lord Inge (1987–1992)
- Lieutenant General Sir Christopher Wallace (1992–1999)
- General Sir Richard Dannatt (1999–2005)
- Lieutenant-General Sir William Rollo (2005–2008)
- Lieutenant-General Gerald Berragan (2008–2011)
- General Sir Nick Carter (2011–2015)

== Current RMP units ==
Current RMP units include:

- Belize Police Unit
- Brunei Police Unit
- British Army Training Unit Suffield (BATUS) Police Unit, Canada
- Cyprus Joint Police Unit (CJPU)
  - 1 Platoon CJPU
  - 2 Platoon CJPU
- British Contingent, Force Military Police Unit, (FMPU), United Nations Peacekeeping Force in Cyprus (UNFICYP) – Operational Deployment – not part of British Forces Cyprus.
- Joint Service Police Security Unit (JSPSU), Falkland Islands (Controlled by PM(RAF))
- Joint Provost and Security Unit (JP&SU), Gibraltar (Controlled by PM(N))
- Joint Service Police Unit (JSPU), Diego Garcia, British Indian Ocean Territory
- SHAPE /AFNORTH RMP – Supreme Headquarters Allied Powers Europe, Belgium and Allied Forces North in the Netherlands.

=== 1st Military Police Brigade ===
1st Military Police Brigade (under Regional Command), Andover

- Specialist Operations Regiment, Southwick Park
  - Service Police Crime Bureau
  - Close Protection Unit, Longmoor Camp
- 1 Regiment RMP
  - 110 Provost Company (Leuchars)
  - 150 Provost Company (Catterick Garrison)
  - 174 Provost Company (Donnington)
  - 116 Provost Company (Reserves) (Cannock and Manchester)
  - 243 Provost Company (Reserves) (Livingston and Stockton-on-Tees)
- 3 Regiment RMP
  - 156 Provost Company (Air Assault) (Colchester) - supporting 16 Air Assault Brigade
  - 158 Provost Company (Bulford)
  - 160 Provost Company (Aldershot Garrison)
  - 253 (London) Provost Company (Reserves) (Tulse Hill, London)
- Military Provost Staff, Colchester Garrison
  - Regimental Headquarters, Berechurch Hall Camp
  - Military Corrective Training Centre, Colchester Garrison
  - Headquarters Company
  - SCF Company
  - Detention Company
  - No. 1 Company (Reserves)

=== Defence Serious Crime Unit ===
Tri-service serious crimes unit that replaced the Special Investigations Branches of the UK armed services. Headquarters based at Bulford Garrison.

== The RMP in popular culture ==
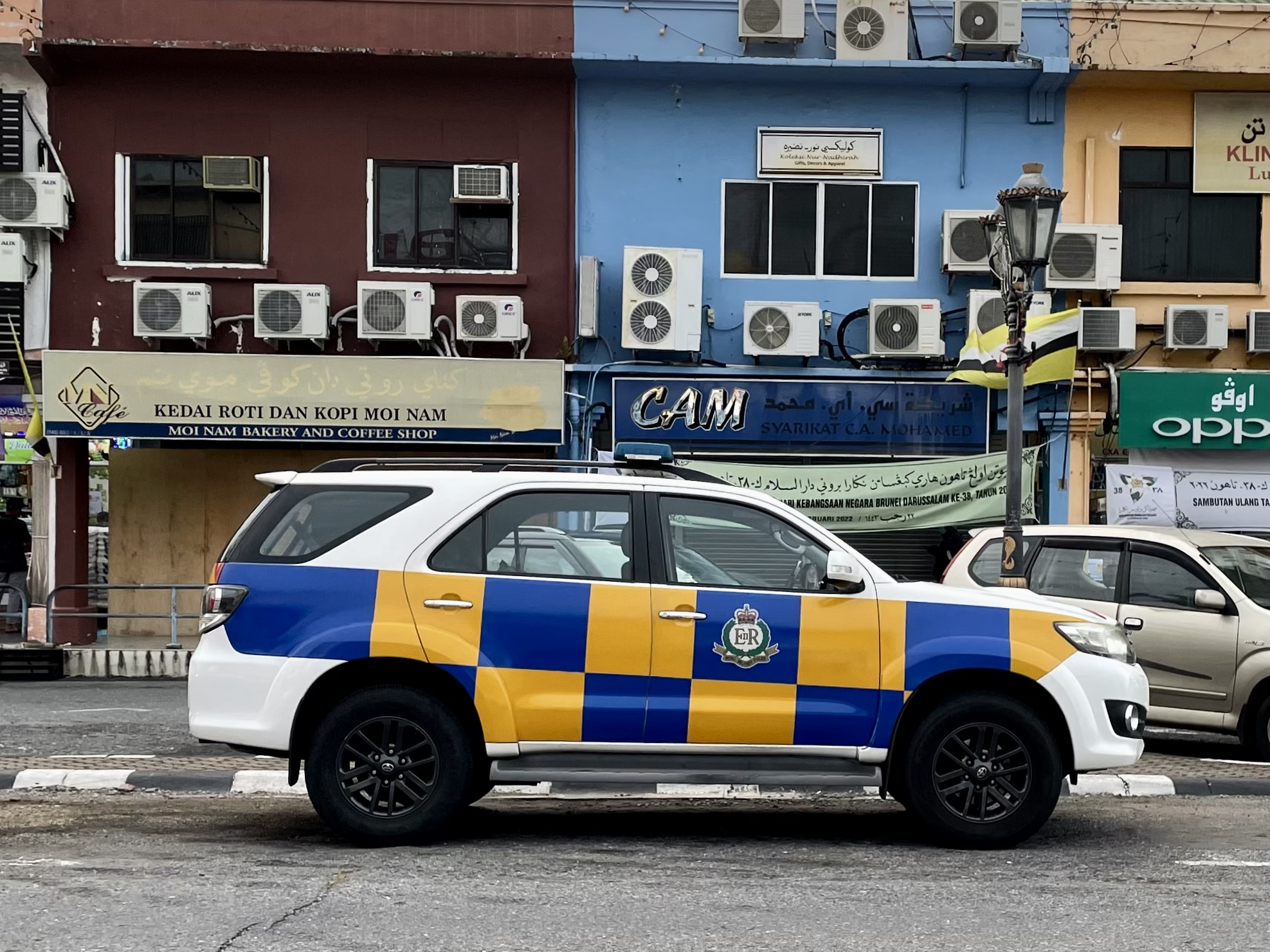
RMP vehicle in Seria, Brunei

Redcap, an ABC television drama series which aired from 1964 to 1966, starred John Thaw as SIB investigator Sergeant (later Staff Sergeant) John Mann.

Soldier Soldier, a television drama series about an infantry company which aired from 1991 to 1997, featured Holly Aird as Corporal (later Sergeant) Nancy Thorpe RMP.

The Investigator (aired 1997) starred Helen Baxendale as an RMP Staff Sergeant. It was about life in the British forces at a time when being homosexual was banned and had serious repercussions. It was based on a true story.

The Real Redcaps was a television documentary series about the Royal Military Police which aired from 2003 to 2005. It shows the RMP in the Second Gulf War, their training in (then) Chichester, Close Protection (CP) training, SIB work in Iraq, and other duties such as policing troops in Germany. It also shows the Military Provost Staff Corps Military Provost Guard Service manning MCTC Colchester.

Red Cap, another television drama series, which aired in 2003 and 2004, starred Tamzin Outhwaite as Sergeant Jo McDonagh, also an SIB investigator.

7 Seconds is a 2005 direct-to-DVD film starring Wesley Snipes, that follows the actions of female Royal Military Police Sergeant Kelly Anders (Tamzin Outhwaite). When an experienced thief accidentally makes off with a valuable Van Gogh painting, his partner is kidnapped by gangsters in pursuit of the painting, forcing the thief to hatch a rescue plan, in which he joins forces with RMP Sgt Anders.

In the 2014 film Edge of Tomorrow, acting as guards around the Army's command post in London, military personnel wearing a futuristic 'MP' arm band and scarlet berets are shown throughout the film. In one of the chase scenes, RMP troops pursued Major William Cage (Tom Cruise) where an RMP soldier in a mechanical suit stops Cage by destroying the front of his getaway car, leading to his capture.

The Missing was a British TV Drama broadcast on the BBC which featured members of the Royal Military Police in several leading and supporting roles, including Laura Fraser as Eve Stone, a Sergeant (later Staff Sergeant) in the RMP.

The Last Post is a 2017 BBC television drama series featuring the men and families of the RMP during the Aden Emergency.

Strike is a Cinemax/BBC television drama series, from the novels by Robert Galbraith. The main character, Cormoran Blue ("C.B.") Strike is a veteran SIB Sergeant who becomes a private investigator in London after being severely injured by a roadside IED in Afghanistan. The character is played by Tom Burke.

== See also ==
- Defence Serious Crime Unit
- Military police of the United Kingdom
- Ministry of Defence Police
- Regimental Police (Regimental Provost Staff)
- Royal Air Force Police
- Royal Marines Police
- Royal Navy Police
- Service Police Crime Bureau
- Intelligence Corps (United Kingdom)
