= Royal Marines Police =

- Country: United Kingdom of Great Britain and Northern Ireland
- Allegiance: HM The King
- Branch: Royal Navy
- Type: Service Police
- Role: Policing and Counter-intelligence

Insignia
- Identification symbol

- Tri-service MP flash

The Royal Marines Police, or Royal Marines Police Troop (RM Police Troop) is the Royal Marines element of the Royal Navy Police and the military police arm of the Royal Marines. Members of the RM Police enforce service law and discipline.

== Structure ==
In 2009 the RM Police came under the operational command of the Royal Navy Police for policing and investigations; providing more investigatory independence from their non-service police chains of command. although it still exists as a distinct unit under the operational control of 3 Commando Brigade.

The overall head of the Royal Navy Police (including RM Police Troop) is the Provost Marshal - Navy.

== Duties and responsibilities ==
The RM Police is responsible for providing garrison policing services – law enforcement and crime prevention as well as general security advice to the command – and provide personnel to the Royal Navy Police Special Investigations Branch (RNP SIB) section for the investigation of serious crime.

RM Police personnel are recruited from within the trained strength of the Royal Marines, following completion of a first posting to a rifle troop in a Commando.

== Units ==
The primary formed unit of the Royal Marines Police is a troop (similar to a platoon in the Army) within 30 Commando Information Exploitation Group, the information exploitation unit of UK Commando Force, based at Stonehouse Barracks, Plymouth.

For example, in 2008 the RM Police Troop consisted of the following:

- Captain (Officer Commanding) (x1)
- Warrant Officer Class 2 (x1)
- Colour Sergeant (x2)
- Sergeant (x3)
- Corporal (x9)
- Lance Corporal (x21)
- Civilian (attached) (x1)

== Operations ==
In military operations, the Royal Marines Police Troop provide military police support for all phases of operations and peacekeeping operations including co-ordinating vehicle movements out of the beachhead, marking the main supply routes and providing convoy escorts.

It also conducts general police duties and provides close protection for the Brigade Commander. Personnel are eligible to undertake the close protection courses run by the Royal Military Police. Royal Marines Police personnel are also attached to other units.

For example, RM Police Troop marines were present at the Edinburgh Military Tattoo in 2017, assisting other Service Police and civilian police.

== Powers and authority ==
Marines and Warrant Officers of the Royal Marines Police are not constables and have no powers in relation to civil law enforcement. However, they are Service Police persons and do have authority under the Armed Forces Act 2006.

== Equipment ==
For general policing duties (GPD) in the United Kingdom, very similar equipment is carried to civilian police forces, such as:

- Black stab vest
- Black (or high visibility yellow) equipment 'tac' vest
- Airwave radio
- Expandable baton
- Rigid handcuffs (speedcuffs)
- Torch
- Gloves.

This is worn with the MTP No. 3B or No. 3D uniform. Normal green Commando beret is also worn. The tri-service 'black-on-red' patch is worn on the jacket/smock sleeve.

RM Police Troop, in the UK, do not generally carry TASER, incapacitant spray, or firearms.

The Royal Navy Police now have their personnel wearing body worn video cameras (BWVC).

== See also ==
- Military police of the United Kingdom
- Royal Navy Police (RNP)
- Royal Military Police (RMP)
- Royal Air Force Police (RAFP)
- Ministry of Defence Police (MDP)
- Military Provost Guard Service (MPGS)
- Ministry of Defence Guard Service (MGS)
- Military Provost Staff (MPS)
- United States Marine Corps Civilian Police
- United States Marine Corps Military Police
