= Master-at-arms =

Variety of military positions

A master-at-arms (US: MA; UK and some Commonwealth: MAA) may be a naval rating, responsible for law enforcement, regulating duties, security, anti-terrorism/force protection (AT/FP) for a country's navy; an army officer responsible for physical training; or a member of the crew of a merchant ship (usually a passenger vessel) responsible for security and law enforcement. In some navies, a ship's corporal is a position—not the rank—of a petty officer who assists the master-at-arms in his various duties. Historically, a master-at-arms was responsible for the training of soldiers during peace time, or actively involved in leading the defense of a fortification during war time.

In some countries, the term navy police is used for a part of a navy responsible for law enforcement, such as the Royal Navy Police, known as the Royal Navy Regulating Branch until 2007.

== United Kingdom ==
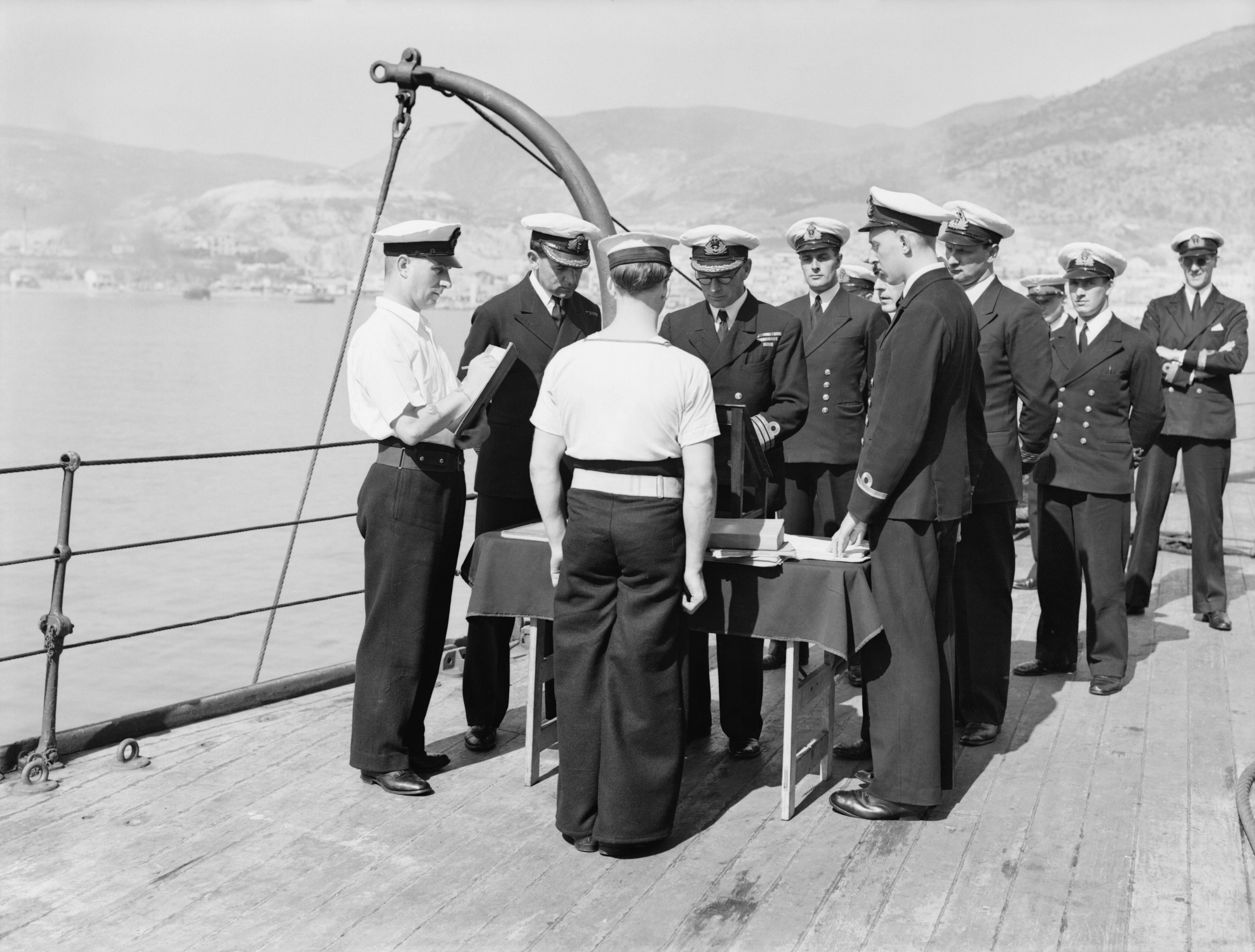
On board HMS Rodney, the master-at-arms (left) reads out the names at the "captain's defaulters and requestmen" parade (a type of court martial for minor offences), during World War II

=== Royal Navy ===
The master-at-arms (MAA) is a ship's senior rating, normally carrying the rank of chief petty officer or warrant officer. They are in charge of discipline aboard ship, assisted by regulators of the Royal Navy Police, of which they are a member. The non-substantive (trade) badge of an MAA is a crown within a wreath.

The post of master-at-arms was introduced to the Royal Navy during the reign of King Charles I; their original duties were to be responsible for the ship's small arms and edged weapons, and to drill the ship's company in their use. This was not an onerous task, and masters-at-arms came to be made responsible for "regulating duties"; their role as weapons instructors was eventually taken over by the chief gunner.

The MAA is addressed as "Master" if holding the rank of chief petty officer, regardless of gender, and is often nicknamed the "jaunty", a corruption of the French gendarme, or the "joss/jossman".

As a result of the Armed Forces Act 2006, the term Regulating Branch was changed to Service Police and the branch title changed to the Royal Navy Police and reported to their respective service's Provost Marshal, who was responsible to the First Sea Lord.

=== British Army ===
In the British Army, a master-at-arms is an officer of the Royal Army Physical Training Corps, posted as an SO2 or SO3 at divisional headquarters or higher command, and responsible for overseeing all fitness training in subordinate units. The role is filled by RAPTC WO1s at brigade headquarters, while WO2s or staff sergeant PTIs are embedded at unit level.

== United States Navy ==
In the United States Navy, the master-at-arms rating is responsible for law enforcement, investigations, K-9, expeditionary, and anti-terrorism/force protection operations. It is one of the oldest ratings in the United States Navy, having been recognized since the Navy's inception.
