= Royal Air Force Police =

Branch of the Royal Air Force

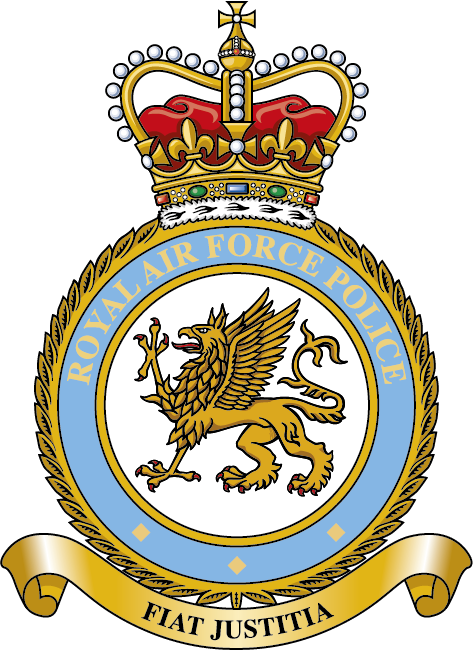
- Badge of the RAFP
- Active: 1 April 1918 – present
- Country: United Kingdom
- Branch: Royal Air Force
- Type: Service police
- Role: Policing, protective security and counter-intelligence
- Nickname: Snowdrops
- Mottos: Fiat justitia (Latin: Let justice be done)
- March: RAF Police March Past

Commanders
- Provost marshal (RAF): Group Captain Samantha Bunn
- Provost Marshal Warrant Officer: Warrant Officer Alex Tathem

Insignia
- Identification symbol

The Royal Air Force Police (RAFP) is the service police branch of the Royal Air Force, headed by the provost marshal of the Royal Air Force. Its headquarters are at RAF Honington, and it deploys throughout the world to support RAF and UK defence missions.

== History ==
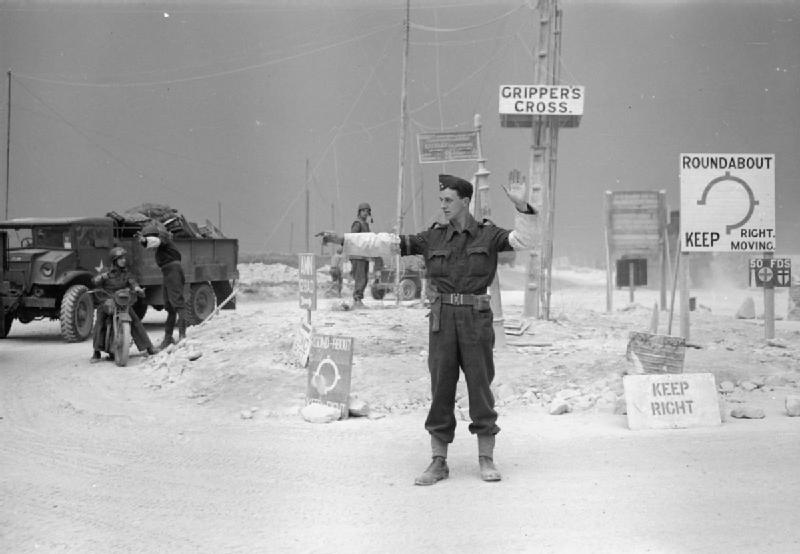
Foreground - Cpl Brian Nash and on the left, directing Army motorcyclist, is Cpl Harry Petters, RAF Police, 2nd Tactical Air Force, 1943–1945, controlling traffic at "Gripper's Cross", a busy roundabout on the Caen to Bayeux Road in Normandy.

The RAF Police was formed on 1 April 1918, when the RAF was formed by the merger of the Royal Flying Corps and the Royal Naval Air Service. By the end of World War II there were 500 officers and 20,000 NCOs in the RAF Police. In January 1947, the RAF Provost Branch became a Specialist Branch within the RAF. In December 1950, George VI approved the badge and motto Fiat Justitia. By 2009, the RAF Police had served in 66 countries around the globe.

== Uniform and insignia ==
RAF Police non-commissioned officers and warrant officers are noticeable by their white-topped caps (giving rise to their nickname of "Snowdrops"), which they have worn since 1945, and by black and red flashes worn below their rank slides. RAF Police commissioned officers wear the standard peaked cap of all RAF officers, with the red and black flashes. In dress uniform, all RAF Police wear a red and black brassard on the left arm, reflecting the flashes worn with normal working dress. In tactical dress, RAF Police personnel wear red "MP" badges, the internationally recognised symbol for military police.

== The oath ==
"I do solemnly and sincerely declare and affirm that as a member of the Royal Air Force Police I will well and truly serve His Majesty the King, acting with fairness, integrity, diligence and impartiality, upholding fundamental human rights and according equal respect to all people; and that I will, to the best of my power, maintain service law and investigate independently and impartially all service offences against people and property; and that while I continue to be a member of the Royal Air Force Police I will, to the best of my skill and knowledge, discharge all the duties of that appointment faithfully according to law."

== Role ==
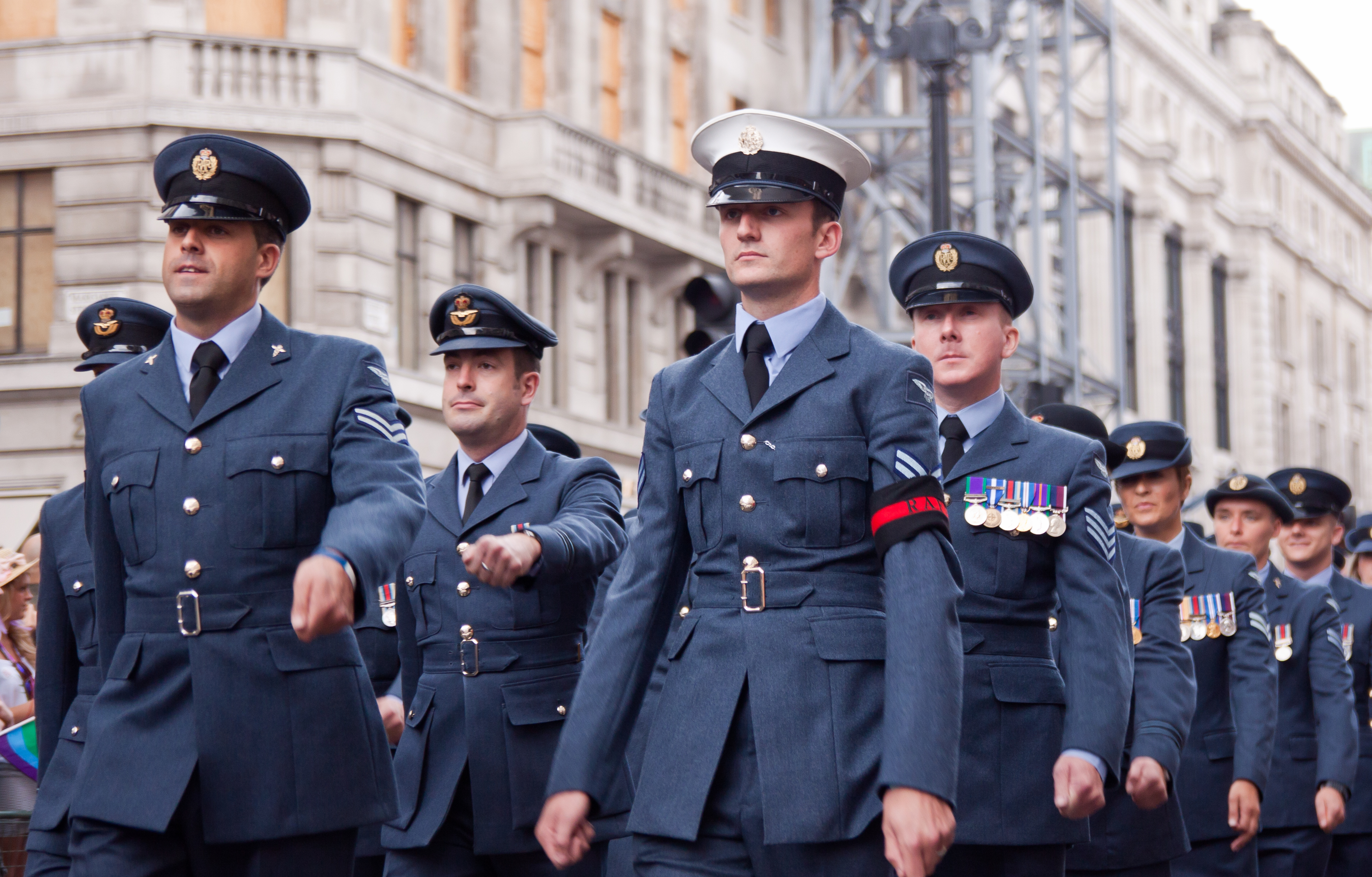
Royal Air Force Police member with distinctive armband and white cap in 2011.

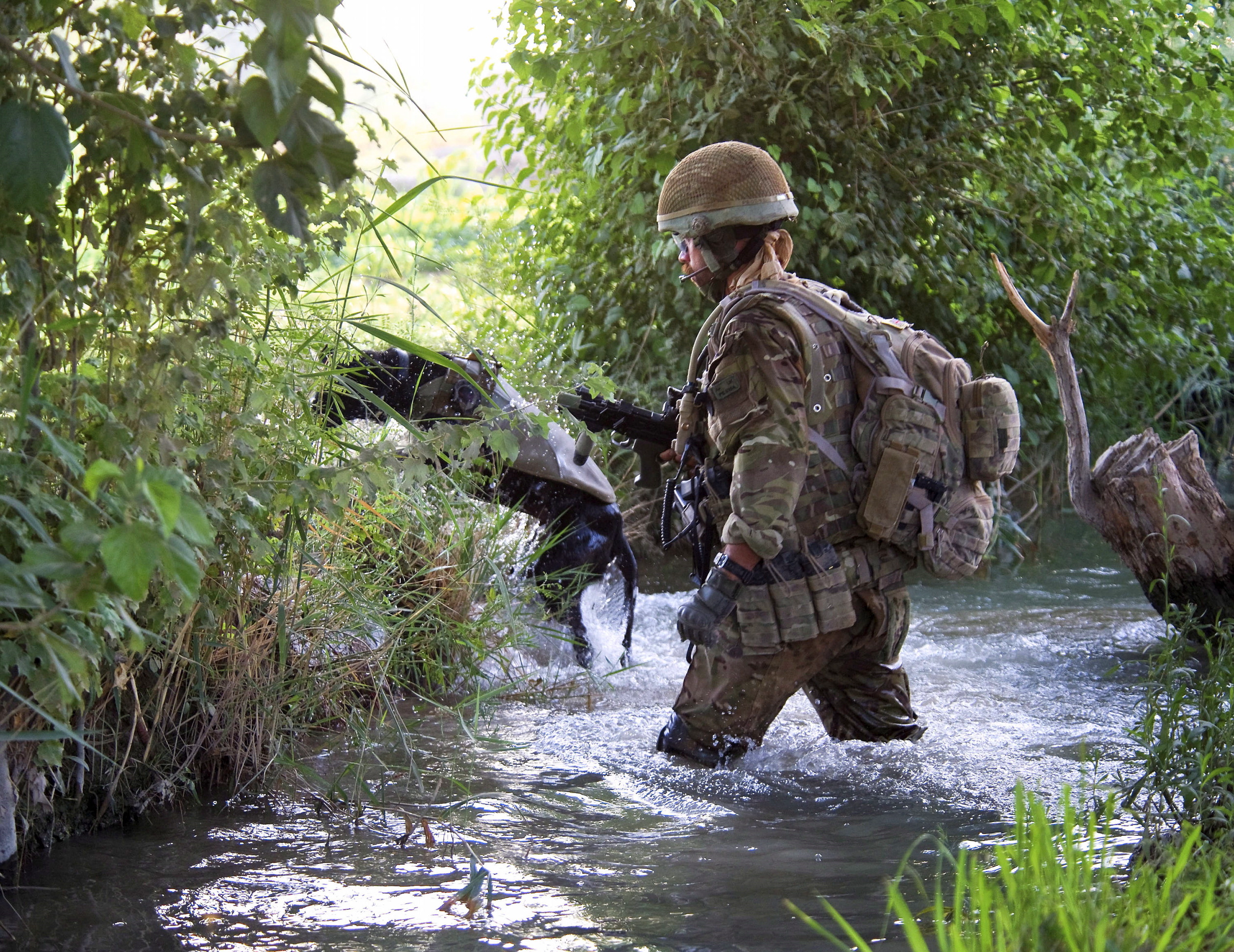
A Royal Air Force Police Dog Handler attached to 42 Commando, on patrol in Helmand Province, Afghanistan (2011).

The RAF Police are responsible for the policing and security of all service personnel, much like their Royal Navy and British Army counterparts.

Provision of policing, counter-intelligence and specialist security support to the RAF includes:

- Front line, Response and Law Enforcement duties
- Criminal and security investigation
- Serious and Complex Criminal Investigations – a DSCU responsibility since December 2022
- Aircraft protection and security
- Covert Operations
- Counter Intelligence Operations
- Cyber and information security
- Military working dogs
- Force protection (on deployed operations)
- Close protection of VIPs

In addition to policing, the RAF Police has security investigators tasked with the investigation of non-criminal conduct offences involving security threats.

The Special Investigation Branch has been disbanded and replaced with the tri-service Defence Serious Crime Unit.

Counter Intelligence Operations Squadron investigate security breaches and support the RAF through the gathering of intelligence and protective security based activities.

These specialist capabilities are supported by forensic and intelligence units. Members of all wings are used for operations overseas, deploying as individuals, with the aircraft they support, or as a formed unit drawn together under the Tactical Police Squadrons. Members of the RAF Police may also specialise in close protection duties, ensuring the safety of VIPs and other dignitaries in hostile environments.

The RAF Police are the only branch of the Service Police who operate police dogs within the UK military. They manage all RAF military working dogs, with detachments at some RAF stations. RAF Police dogs and their handlers support overseas operations. Recently, this has included Iraq and Afghanistan, in both patrol and specialist search roles.

The RAF Police is subject to inspection by HM Inspectorate of Constabulary, in the same way as the UK's civilian police forces.

== Organisation ==
Office of the Provost Marshal (OPM) is the HQ of the Provost Marshal, who holds the rank of group captain. A component of the RAF's Global Enablement Organisation and now re-rolled as the Air Security Force (ASF), the RAF Police is organised into capability wings that operate both within the UK and overseas.

The Provost Marshal also holds the title Commander of the Air Security Force.

Detachments of RAF Police can be found at some RAF stations. Usually, the detachment consists of a Flight, commanded by either a Flying Officer or a Flight Lieutenant; a Flight Sergeant or Sergeant usually functions as the senior non-commissioned officer of the flight.

RAF Police Flights are responsible to and directed by an RAF Police Squadron. Squadron HQs are based at the larger RAF stations and provide remote oversight of the Police Flights at the units within their respective area of responsibility. Squadron HQs are themselves responsible to, and directed by, the Deputy Provost Marshal of the RAF Police, who is a wing commander. RAF Police personnel are not responsible to, or under the direct command of, the Commanding Officer (Station Commander) of the station at which they are situated; all service police on RAF Police wings remain under the command of the Provost Marshal (RAF). Their authority to act as service police stems directly from the Armed Forces Act 2006. Service police are able to issue lawful commands to any service person, regardless of their rank or trade.

The RAF Police also provides the RAF's Counter-intelligence & Protective Security (CI & PS) role, similar to that carried out by the Intelligence Corps and elements of the Royal Signals of the British Army. IT Security is a further specialisation within the protective security field, and personnel trained to this level are expected to perform all PS and IT Security related tasks. Over 400 RAF Police personnel are seconded to roles within Strategic Command, providing Counter Intelligence and Protective Security capabilities to UK and overseas operations. No Law Enforcement capability is maintained on StratCom.

=== New operating model, 2021 ===
The RAF Police is to reform in 2021–2022. These reforms will see Wing Headquarters align with individual RAF groups, and the squadrons align with individual operational forces (e.g. Lightning Force, ISTAR Force, etc.) within their respective groups.

=== Future Operating Model, 2022 ===
In 2022, HQ AIR instigated a rapid and challenging change program in its operating model for the whole of the RAF. This has seen all single service SIBs amalgamate into a single formation headed by a newly created Provost Marshal (Serious Crime), resulting in the RAF SIB capability being handed to the new Defence Serious Crime Unit.

In November 2022, the 1-star (Air Officer (AO) FP) was re-roled into AO Global Enablement (GE), resulting in the disbandment of the FP Force.

PM(RAF) is in command of the RAF Police, MPGS and associated civil servants. This new force is known as the Air Security Force (ASF). PM(RAF) also now attracts the title of Commander ASF.

Instead of the traditional geographical squadrons, there are now three Police and Security wings and nine capability-facing squadrons. These are:

Wings

- 1 Police & Sy – People facing
- 2 Police & Sy – Platform facing
- 3 Police & Sy – Air Mobility facing Sqns
- 1 Tactical Police & Sy Sqn
- 2 Counter Intelligence and Security Sqn
- 3 Police (Reserves) & Sy Sqn
- 4 Police & Sy Sqn supporting the Typhoon Force
- 5 Police & Sy Sqn supporting the ISTAR Force
- 6 Police & Sy Sqn supporting the Lightning Force
- 7 Police & Sy Sqn supporting the Air Mobility Force
- 8 Police & Sy Sqn supporting the 22 Gp Training Units
- 9 Police & Sy Sqn supporting Battlespace Management & Space Force.

== Recent operations ==
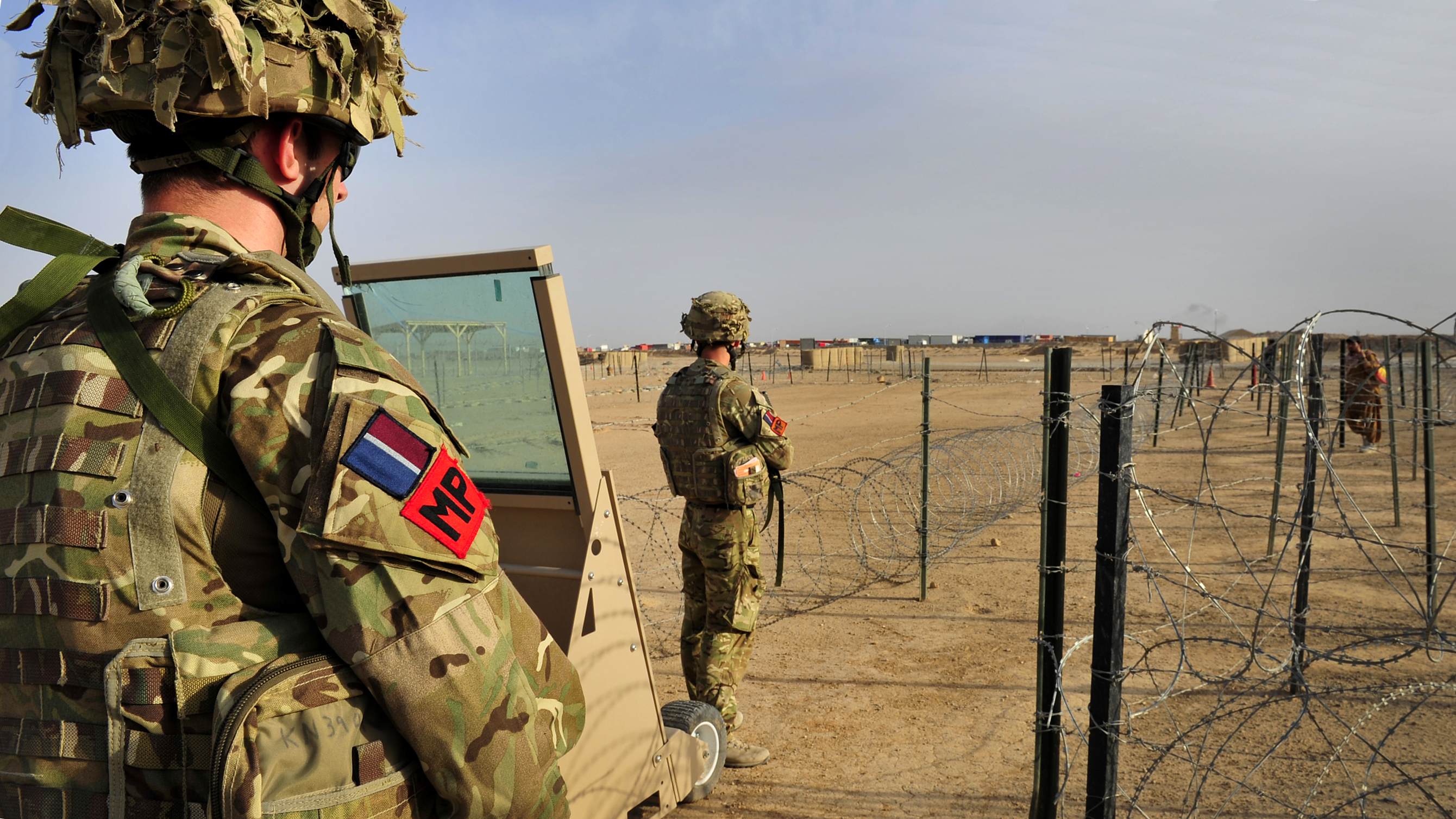
Royal Air Force Police guarding the Main Entry Point at Camp Bastion in Helmand Province, Afghanistan (2013).

In Afghanistan, as part of the RAF's Force Protection Wing, the RAF Police provided security for Camp Bastion along with external support to frontline troops, operating within fighting patrols, detainee handling and Weapon Intelligence Specialists.

On 12 May 2012, Cpl Brent McCarthy – an RAF Policeman stationed at RAF Brize Norton – was shot and killed while on duty in Helmand Province.

RAF Police, along with other units, took part in the Mobility Guardian exercise in 2017.

Between the 14 August 21 and 28 August 21, RAF Police deployed on Op PITTING alongside 16 Air Assault Brigade. Screening and securing approx 122,000 people evacuating from Afghanistan.

== Training ==
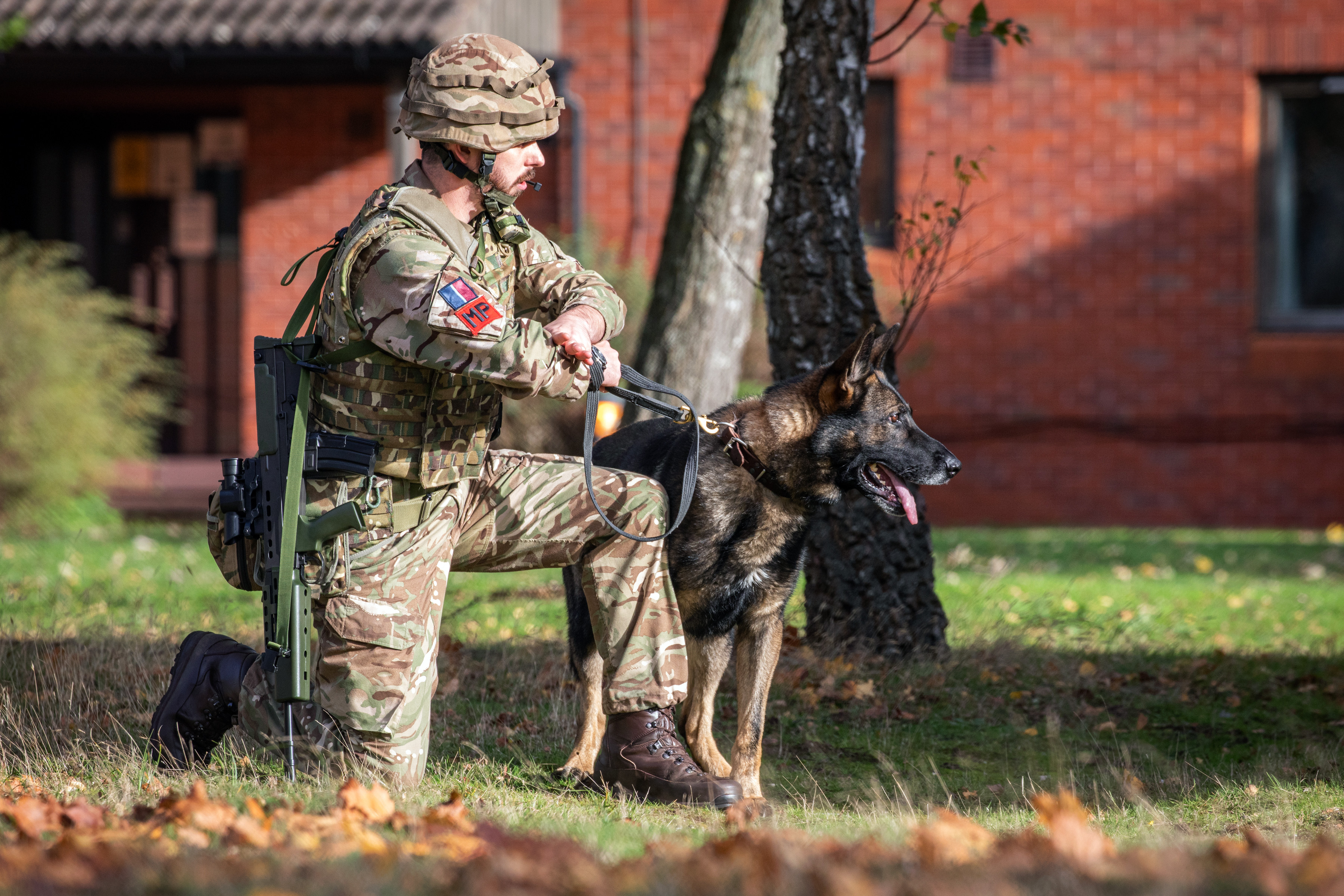
A Royal Air Force Police military working dog handler with a dog during training in 2022.

Ground trades personnel within the Royal Air Force start their service career at RAF Halton where they undergo basic training consisting of 10 weeks. Once this is successfully completed, recruit intakes are dispersed to the various Ground Trades Training Schools.

Potential RAF Police recruits are trained at the Defence School of Policing and Security at Southwick Park, Hampshire, along with recruits of the Royal Navy Police and the Royal Military Police. In order to conduct some of the wider specialist roles, particularly involving the investigation of more serious and complex crime and security investigations, extensive further post-graduation training is provided outside DSPS to all RAF Police specialists by Home Office police forces and training providers. Most of the training requirements of a Home Office police force in terms of detective training and covert operations are delivered to specialist RAF Police elements.

During the 1950s, training was carried out at RAF Netheravon in Wiltshire, and in the 1960s at RAF Debden near Saffron Walden. Until the mid-1990s, trade training took place at RAF Newton in Nottinghamshire, before moving to RAF Halton in Buckinghamshire. In 2004, all UK service police training was consolidated at Southwick Park.

== See also ==
- Service Police
- Service Police Crime Bureau
- Royal Military Police
- Royal Navy Police
- Royal Marines Police
- Special Investigation Branch
- Ministry of Defence Police
