= Royal Navy Police =

Police Service for the Royal Navy

- Active: 1944–Present
- Country: United Kingdom
- Branch: Royal Navy
- Type: Service police
- Role: Policing and Counter-intelligence
- Motto: Ne Cede Malis (Latin for 'Do not yield to evil')
- Engagements: Neuve Chapelle
- Website: royalnavy.mod.uk

Commanders
- Provost Marshal (Navy): Commander Elizabeth Grant RN

Insignia
- White Ensign (1801 – present)

- Naval jack

The Royal Navy Police (RNP) is the service police branch of the Royal Navy and Royal Marines. Members of the RNP enforce service law and discipline.

The Royal Navy Police was known as the Royal Navy Regulating Branch until 2007, when the service was renamed the Royal Navy Police in a change brought about by the Armed Forces Act 2006. Members were known as "Regulators" until 2009, since then they have been known as Royal Navy Police.

The RNP subsumed the Royal Marines Police in 2009, although for operational purposes the majority of the two cadres of personnel are employed within their respective areas of the service. The RNP provides a Troop strength unit of Royal Marines to 3 Commando Brigade to provide policing services as part of the UK Landing force.

The motto of the RNP is Ne Cede Malis which translates from Latin into English as 'Do not yield to adversity' or 'Do not give in to evil'.

The RNP is the smallest of all police branches in the three services, with its provost marshal holding the rank of commander.

== History ==
The Royal Navy has always, in one way or another, had the need to maintain order and discipline. When at sea, historically, the captain was the king's representative, his rule was kept by the first lieutenant, who was assisted by a person known as thee Ship's Marshal, who was supported by a number of ship's corporals. Ship's marshals were abolished and replaced by the Master At Arms (MAA) rate, which was introduced in about 1699, a tradition that continues right up to the present day.

On punishment day, at six bells in the forenoon watch, the order was given,"All hands to witness punishment". The master at arms presented the offender to the captain, who questioned him about the offence and then delivered a verdict. The officer of the offender's division was asked if he had anything to say in mitigation. If their reply did not satisfy the captain, he ordered the man's punishment. Other than the actual act of flogging, the MAA was responsible for ensuring that any punishment awarded was carried out. The MAA was also accountable to the Lieutenant at arms for the duties of the ship's corporals, the supervision of sentries, the guard, and training the ship's company in the use of small arms. Another duty that the MAA performed was, at around 9 pm, to patrol the ship and check that all lanterns and fires were out, and that no men were intoxicated. Probably an early form of evening rounds.

In September 1944, the Admiralty concluded that the organisation for the maintenance of discipline on shore in the main naval port areas was unsatisfactory. Colonel D.H.C. Shepherd, R.M., previously the Naval Provost Marshal in Malta, carried out a study into the requirement for a naval provost organisation. He reported that the system of landing ships' patrols in major naval base areas was unsatisfactory because the petty officers and leading ratings in charge, (however well briefed) lacked the knowledge and experience to deal with incidents, and being unable to render lucid written reports, avoided taking action wherever possible. The men detailed for patrol disliked the duty intensely believing it to be a form of punishment.

The Shepherd report recommended the introduction of a Leading Patrolman rating to become the junior member of the Regulation Branch and borne primarily for provost duties, and the creation of a provost organisation to operate within the major naval port areas. Admiralty Fleet Order 6681/44 of 21 December 1944 implemented the proposals of the Shepherd report.

As a result of the Shepherd report, regulating branch training, which hitherto had been carried out in the barracks of the main ports, was centralised. In 1945, a Royal Navy Regulating School was established at Beechwood Camp in Devon to train all regulating ratings and to maintain branch records. In 1946, the school moved to Fort Wallington near Portsmouth, then in 1947 to HMS Cicero in Essex, then in 1948 to HMS Excellent, where it remained until November 2005. Initially, the role of the leading patrolman was to augment naval patrols on shore, and assist in regulating duties as necessary. In 1968 leading patrolmen were renamed leading regulators.

In 2007 the Royal Navy Regulating Branch was renamed the Royal Navy Police in a change brought about by the Armed Forces Act 2006.

== Role ==
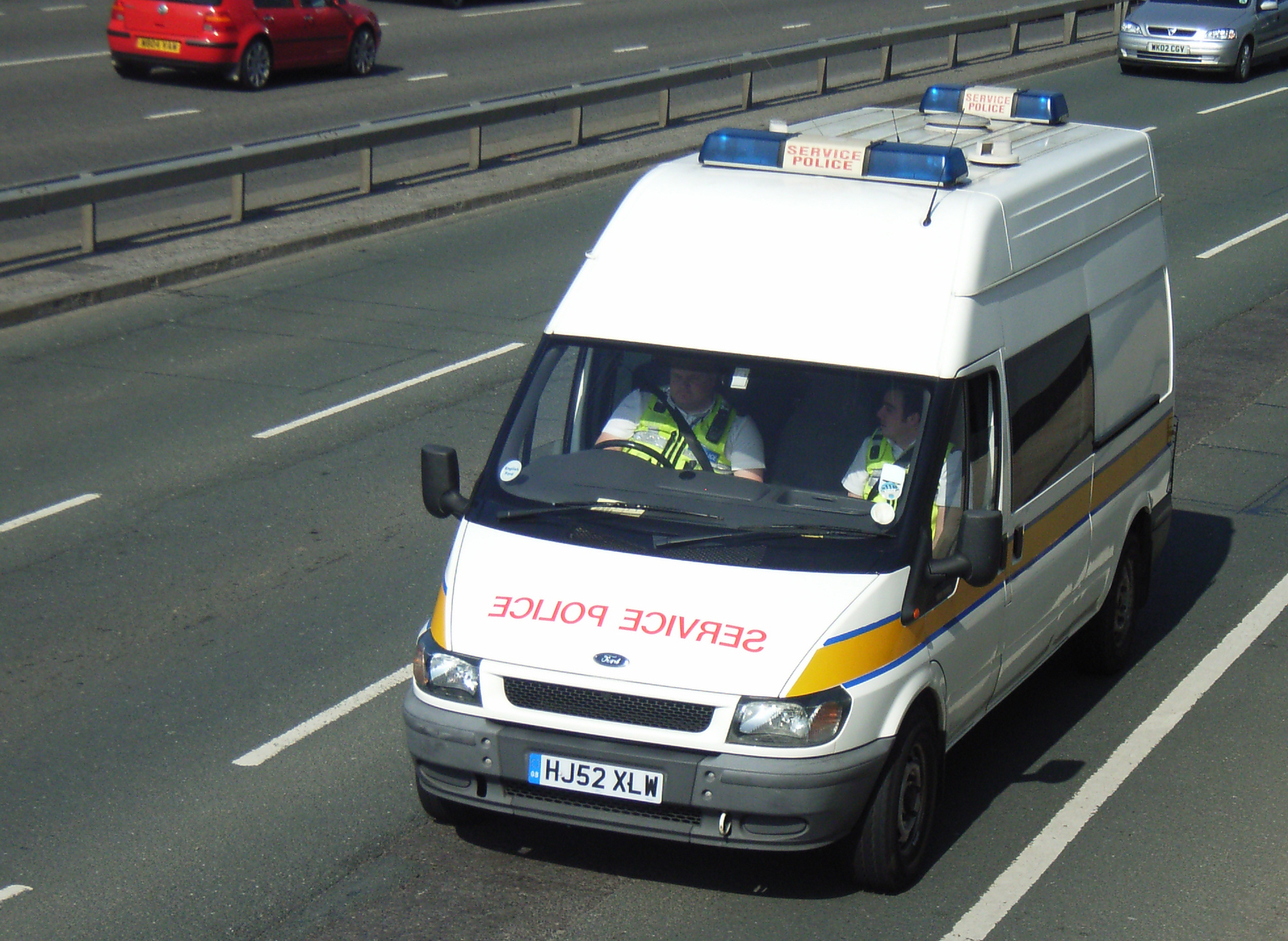
RN Service Police van

The work of the RNP encompasses dealing with routine disciplinary matters, investigation of crime, crime prevention, and advice to the command on general security and close protection matters. As such, members of the RNP are employed in both uniformed and plainclothes roles, on ships, within shore establishments and in 3 Commando Brigade and other Royal Marine units.

Individuals posted on ships and within shore establishments are responsible, through their chain of command for:

- Maintenance of good order and discipline
- Investigating breaches of service discipline
- Investigation of crime
- Investigation of thefts of foul weather jackets
- Evidence gathering
- Crime reduction initiatives
- Liaison with territorial police forces and special police forces in the UK.

Although members of the RNP are not warranted constables, the force as a whole is subject to inspection by HM Inspectorate of Constabulary, in the same way as the UK's civilian police forces.

== Jurisdiction ==
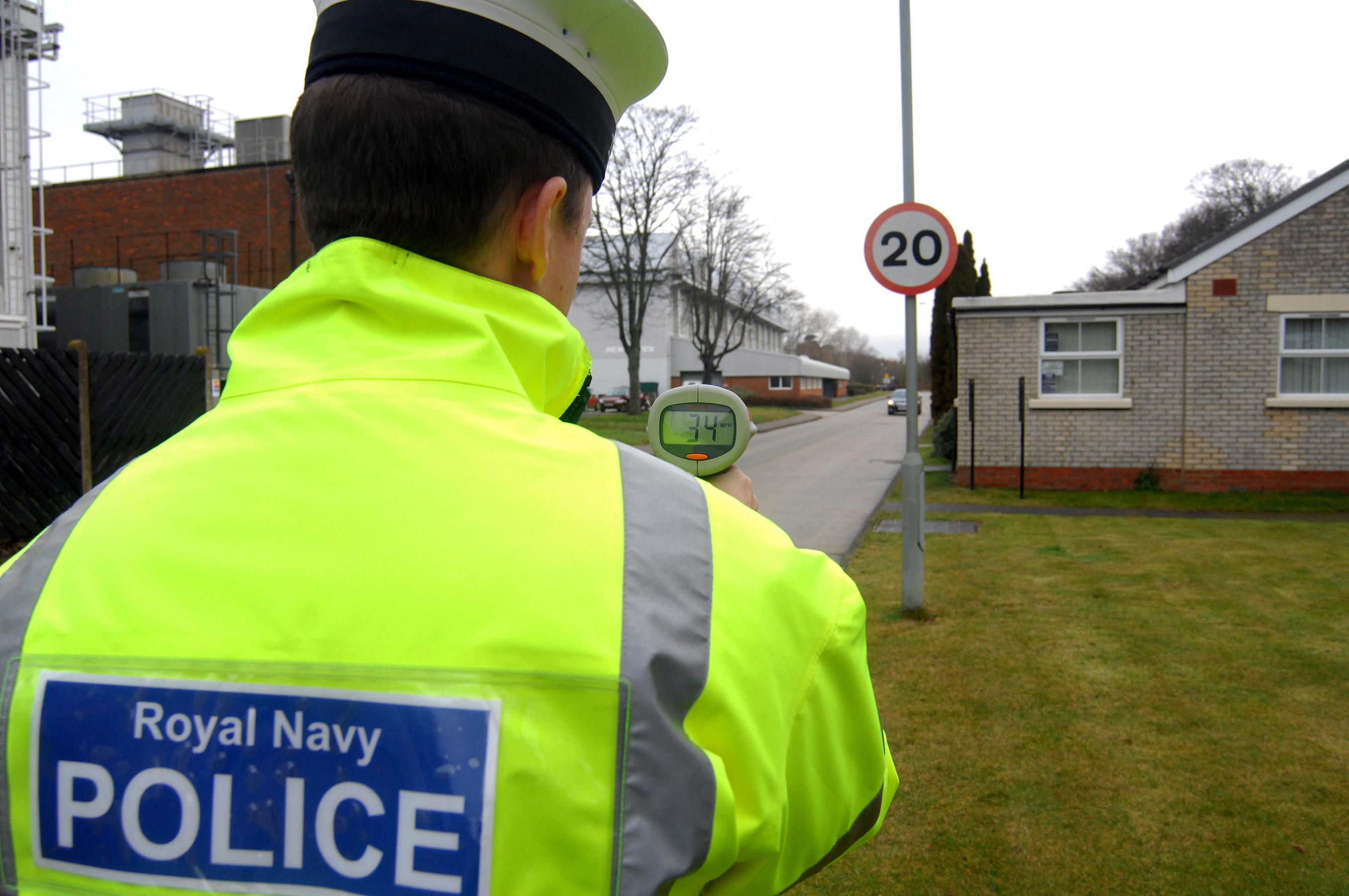
A member of the Royal Navy Police carrying out a vehicle speed check at HMS Sultan in Gosport, Hampshire.

=== Over service personnel ===
The RNP have jurisdiction over members of the Royal Navy subject to service discipline, as well as having reciprocal powers to deal with service personnel of the other two branches of the Armed Forces, namely the British Army and the Royal Air Force.

=== Over civilians ===
The RNP have jurisdiction over some civilians in certain circumstances, as defined by the Armed Forces Act 2006.

The RNP have been granted maritime law enforcement powers within English and Welsh territorial waters under the Police and Crime Act 2017 by virtue of a statutory instrument, which came into effect on 7 January 2021. These powers include power to stop, board, divert and detain vessels, the power to search vessels and persons and the power to arrest persons in England and Wales' waters. The powers can only be exercised in Scottish waters where there has been a hot pursuit. The authority of the Secretary of State is required before a law enforcement officer boards a United Kingdom ship in foreign waters and such authority may only be exercised if the State, or the relevant territory, in whose waters the powers would be exercised consents to the exercise of the powers. The policy context is that contingency work for the end of the EU Transition Period identified that there may be an operational requirement to extend law enforcement powers to Royal Navy Police, which were granted with the caveats that the powers would only be used where police permission was granted, that no law enforcement activity will be undertaken independently and that the arrangements will be reviewed every six months. This is one of the only known examples where the armed forces (albeit, a specific branch) have powers of arrest over civilians whilst within the territory of the UK.

== Organisation ==
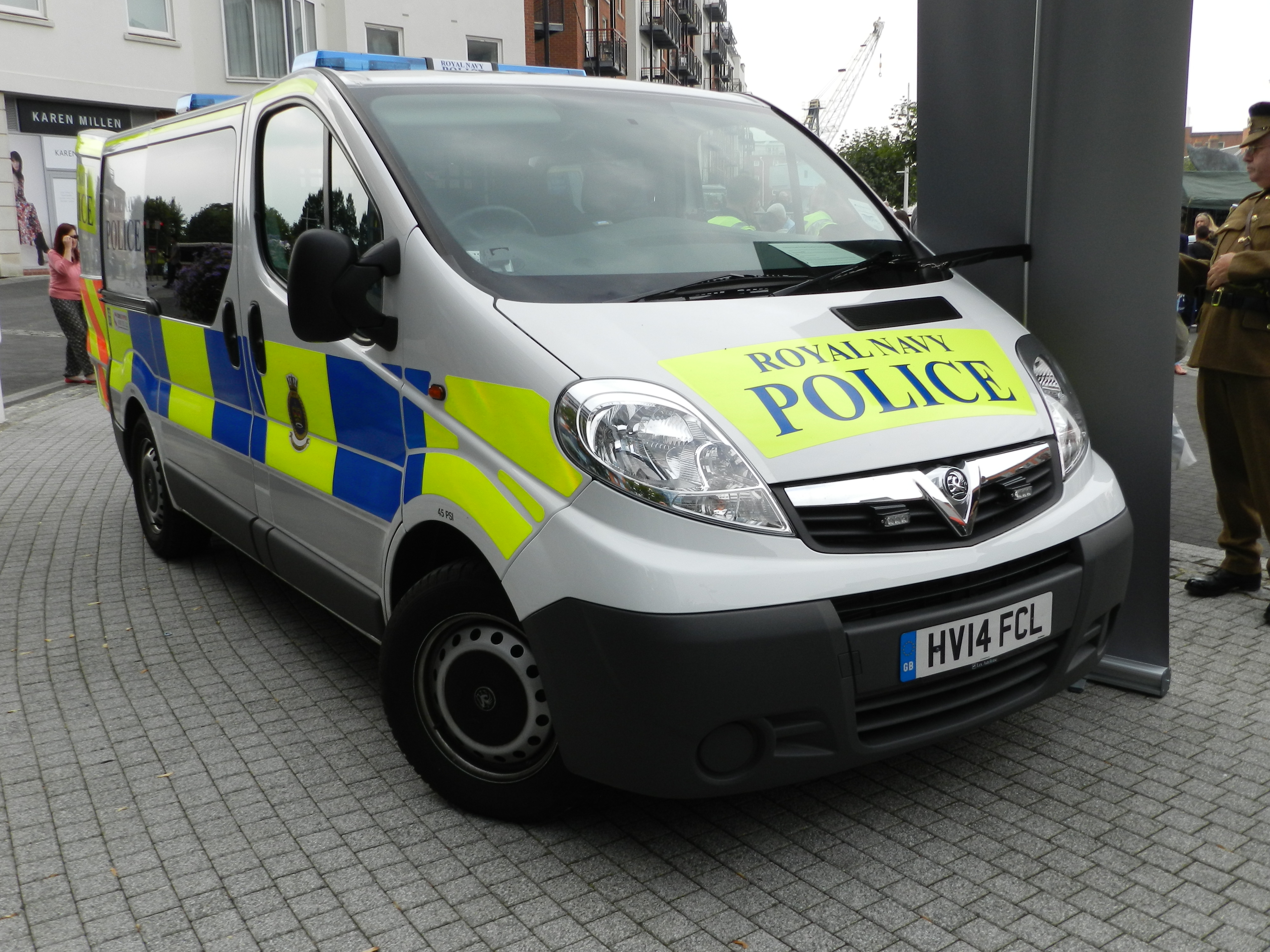
Royal Navy Police Vauxhall Vivaro van

The Royal Navy Police is headed by the Provost Marshal (Navy) (PM(N)), based at HMS Excellent, Portsmouth, who is responsible for the management of the service, and the assurance of professional standards delivered by the RNP in the course of their duties.

Each RNP Regional Command Unit is led by an Officer Commanding at Lieutenant rank.

- Headquarters, Royal Navy Police (RNP), at HMS Excellent, HMNB Portsmouth
  - Provost Marshal of the Royal Navy Police (PM(N)), Commodore
  - RNP Regional Command Unit (East), at HMNB Portsmouth
  - RNP Regional Command Unit (West), at HMNB Devonport
  - RNP Regional Command Unit (North), at HMNB Clyde

The former Royal Navy Police Special Investigation Branch, with offices at HMNB Portsmouth and HMNB Devonport, was disbanded in December 2022, and replaced by the new tri-service Defence Serious Crime Unit.

== Recruiting and training ==
Historically, the Royal Navy Police recruited internally, however from 2018 it has been possible to apply directly as a civilian. In addition to the standard recruitment process, Candidates undertake a suitability assessment during the Royal Navy Acquaint Centre stage of application. On completion of training, candidates are rated as leading hand, or corporal.

Further professional training is delivered at MOD Southwick Park, or through territorial police forces, and is required for later advancement to petty officer or sergeant, master at arms (MAA) or colour sergeant or warrant officer class 1.

Commissioned officers in the specialisation are drawn from within, with candidates considered suitable for commissioning via the senior upper yardman scheme as officers of the warfare branch of the Royal Navy or as officers of the Royal Marines.

== Dress ==
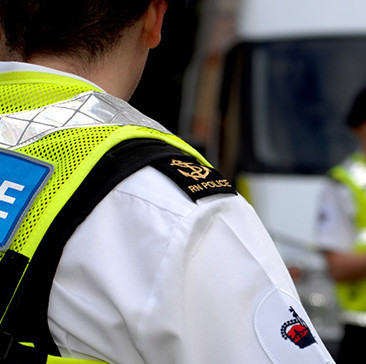
A Royal Navy Police rating

The trade badge for Royal Navy Police is a crown (worn in a wreath by Masters-At-Arms).

When undertaking General Police Duties (GPD), RNP will wear Rig 22 with combat boots. They will also wear a black stab vest, or high-visibility equipment vest or both, or hi-visibility jacket marked with "RN POLICE" or "ROYAL NAVY POLICE" and a dark-blue beret.

With the introduction of the Rig 22, this uniform was adopted as the standard patrol attire.

== GPD equipment ==
In addition to a stab vest, RNP will carry an expandable Monadnock baton, speedcuffs, a TETRA radio with earpiece (on the secure Airwave network) and limb restraints.

All RNP personnel also wear the DEMS D5 body camera on their vests, when undertaking GPD.

== See also ==
- Defence Serious Crime Unit
- Military police of the United Kingdom
- Defence School of Policing and Guarding
- Offences against military law in the United Kingdom
- Royal Military Police (British Army)
- Royal Air Force Police
- British Indian Ocean Territory Police
- Ministry of Defence Police
- USN master-at-arms and NCIS, the approximate United States equivalents to the RN Police and RN Police SIB.
