= Provost (military police) =

Military police who only police within the armed forces

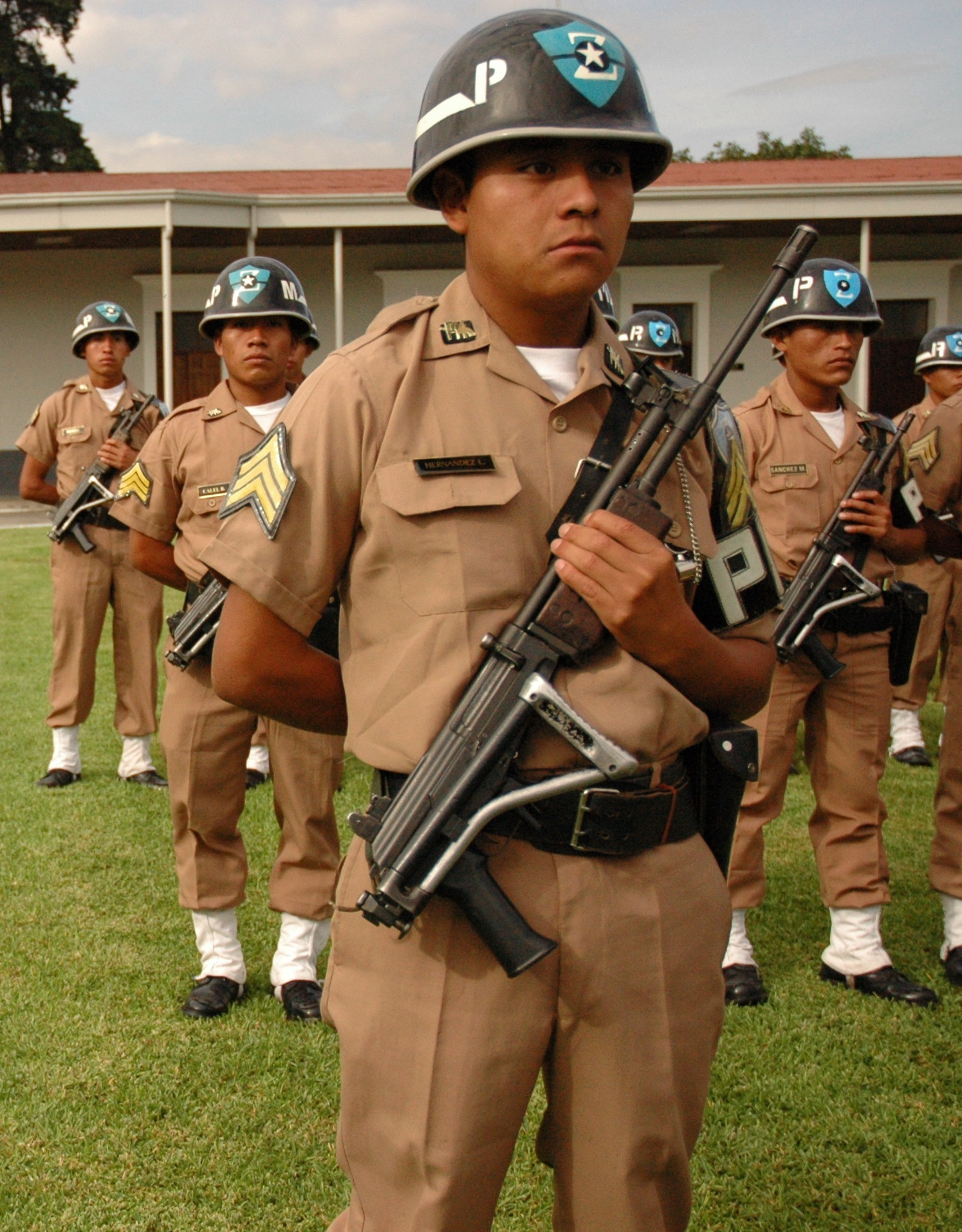
A military police NCO from Guatemala with a Galil rifle

Provosts are military police (MP) whose duties are policing solely within the armed forces of a country, as opposed to gendarmerie duties in the civilian population. However, many countries use their gendarmerie for provost duties.

As with all official terms, some countries have specific official terminology which differs from the exact linguistic meaning. The head of the military police is commonly referred to as the provost marshal, an ancient title originally given to an officer whose duty was to ensure that an army did no harm to the citizenry.

Military police are concerned with law enforcement (including criminal investigation) on military property and concerning military personnel, installation security, close personal protection of senior military officers, management of prisoners of war, management of military prisons, traffic control, route signing and resupply route management. Not all military police organizations are concerned with all of these areas, however. These personnel are generally not front-line combatants but, especially when directing military convoys, will be at or close to the front line. Some MPs, such as the U.S. Military Police Corps, are used as the primary defense force in rear area operations.

In many countries, military forces have separate prisons and judicial systems, different from civilian entities. The military possibly also has its own interpretation of criminal justice.

== Australia ==
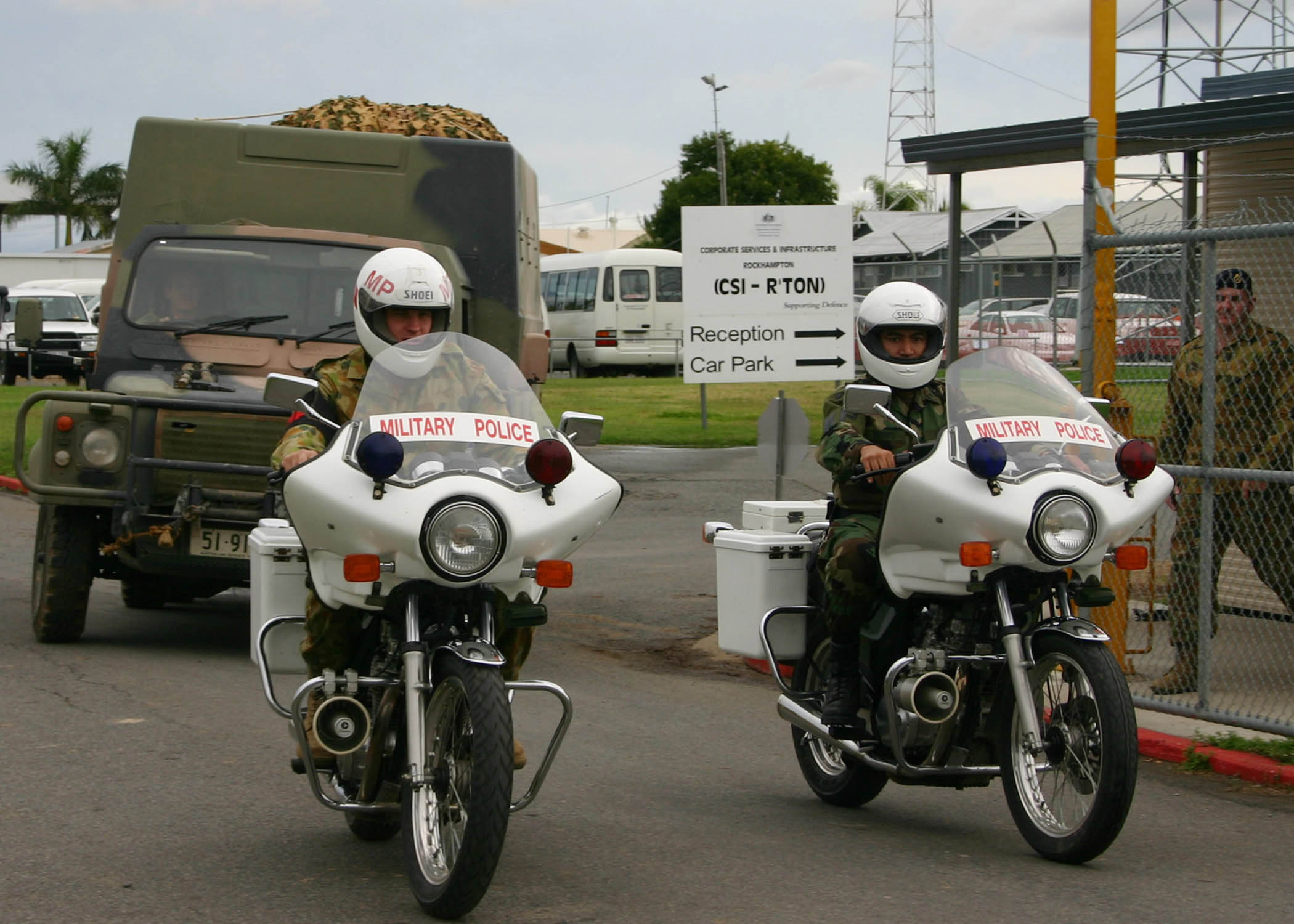
An Australian Army Land Rover and two military police motorcycles.

The Joint Military Police Unit is the unified provost agency of the Australian Defence Force and includes the Australian Defence Force Investigative Service.

== Austria ==
The military police of the Austrian Bundesheer is called Kommando Militärstreife & Militärpolizei (Austrian Military Police).

== Belgium ==
The Belgian Army's Military Police Group (Groupe Police Militaire in French, Groep Militaire Politie in Dutch) performs military police duties on behalf of all four components of the Belgian military. The group is headed by a lieutenant-colonel and numbers 188 members in five MP companies.

Military police duties in Belgium have always included enforcement of military discipline, managing road traffic and wartime handling of prisoners of war. In 2003, duties relating to refugees and deserters in wartime were transferred from the then disbanded Gendarmerie Nationale to the MPs. Members of the former 4 and 6 MP Companies were folded into the new MP Group, along with some Gendarmes previously assigned MP-related duties.

Belgian MPs are identified by black armbands with the letters MP in white block letters, worn on the left arm.

== Brazil ==
Despite the name, Brazil's Military Police, or Polícia Militar (PM) units in each Brazilian state are not provost forces, but gendarmerie-like law enforcement units responsible for preventive police and public security. Each branch of the Brazilian Armed Forces, however, has its own provost force.

== Canada ==
The Canadian Forces Military Police (CFMP) contribute to the effectiveness and readiness of the Canadian Armed Forces (CAF) and the Department of National Defence (DND) through the provision of professional police, security and operational support services worldwide.

CFMP are classified as peace officers in the Canadian Criminal Code, which gives them the same powers as civilian law enforcement personnel to enforce Acts of Parliament on or in relation to DND property or assets anywhere in the world. They have the power to arrest anyone who is subject to the Code of Service Discipline (CSD), regardless of position or rank under the National Defence Act (NDA). CFMP have the power to arrest and charge non-CSD-bound civilians only in cases where a crime is committed on or in relation to DND property or assets, or at the request of the Minister of Public Safety, Commissioner of the Correctional Service of Canada or Commissioner of the Royal Canadian Mounted Police. Although CFMP jurisdiction is only on DND property across Canada and throughout the world, any civilian accessing these areas falls under MP jurisdiction and is dealt with in the same manner as by a civilian policing agency. If a crime is committed on or in relation to DND property or assets, CFMP have the power to arrest and charge the offender, military or civilian, under the Criminal Code. The purpose of the CFMP is not to replace civilian police officers but rather to support the Canadian Forces through security and policing services. CFMP also have the authority to enforce Provincial traffic law on military bases in accordance with section 6(1) the Government Property Traffic Regulations (GPTR).

== People's Republic of China (mainland) ==
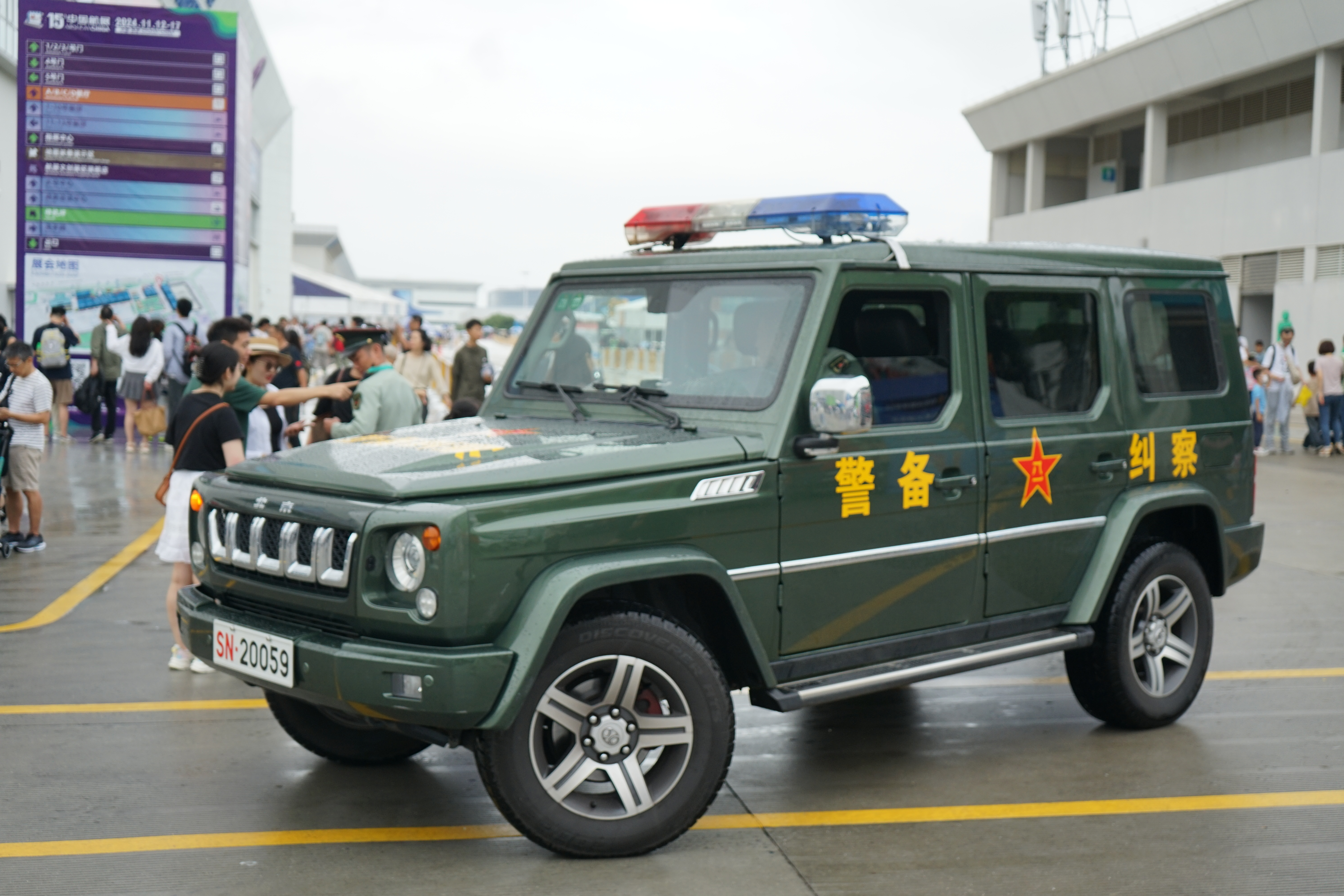
A PLA Military police vehicle

Each branch of the Chinese People's Liberation Army and each police branch of the Chinese People's Armed Police has its own military police. In accordance with the Regulations of the Chinese People's Liberation Army on Police Preparedness, Article 7 stipulates that in units above the regimental level, "the military affairs department of the commander's organ shall be responsible for the management of police preparedness operations in the region", which is externally referred to as the police preparedness office, and shall dispatch and lead police pickets to perform police preparedness duties in accordance with the provisions of Article 27. Article 4 of the Police Regulation provides that:

The main tasks of policing are
(1) Maintaining military discipline.
(2) Maintaining order in the operation of military vehicles and traffic safety.
(3) To investigate and deal with impersonation of military personnel, military vehicles and military units in accordance with the prescribed authority
(4) To safeguard the image of the army and the legitimate rights and interests of soldiers out in the field
(5) To carry out temporary guard duty.

The duties of the military police detachment are only concerned with issues such as the military appearance and discipline of military personnel and vehicles. Legal matters involving criminal law enforcement and public security administrative law enforcement rights belong to the military procuratorates and military defence departments. Cases of impersonation of military personnel, military vehicles and military units detected during police picketing are transferred to the jurisdiction of local judicial organs for handling. The jurisprudence is that in general criminal cases (i.e. excluding crimes against military duties), military status does not constitute a special subject. According to Article 4 of the Regulations on Handling Criminal Cases Involving the Military and Localities, which was implemented by the Supreme People's Court, the Supreme People's Procuratorate, the Ministry of Public Security, the Ministry of Justice and the General Political Department of the PLA on 1 August 2009, the principle of personal jurisdiction is adopted, and military personnel (including active military personnel, military civilian personnel, non-active public service personnel, employees on staff, retired personnel administered by the military, as well as reserve personnel and other personnel performing military The investigation, prosecution, trial and execution of penalties against military personnel (including active-duty military personnel, military civilian personnel, inactive public service personnel, employees on staff, retired personnel administered by the military, as well as reservists and other personnel carrying out military duties) shall be under the jurisdiction of the military defence departments, military procuratorates and military courts; the investigation, prosecution, trial and execution of penalties against local personnel shall be under the jurisdiction of local judicial organs. before the 2018 institutional reform, personnel of the public security border guard, fire-fighting and security forces formerly included in the sequence of the Chinese People's Armed Police Force were determined in accordance with local personnel jurisdiction.

== Taiwan ==
Unlike military police in many other countries, the Republic of China Military Police (中華民國憲兵) is a separate branch of the ROC Armed Forces. The ROCMP is responsible for enforcing military law, maintaining military discipline, providing backup for the civilian police force and serving as combat troops during times of emergency, providing security for certain government buildings, including the Presidential Office Building in Taipei City, as well as performing counter-terrorism and VIP-protection operations. The ROCMP is also charged with the defense of Taipei, the capital of Taiwan.

== Finland ==
The Sotilaspoliisi ("Soldier Police") are the military police of the Finnish Defence Forces. Their emblem is a black armband on the left shoulder with the letters 'SP' in white. SPs have no power over civilians except inside military zones and installations. However, SPs can be used as temporary manpower when the regular police are undermanned. For example, during the 2005 Helsinki athletics championships, military police conscripts were placed all along the running tracks through the city to prevent the large numbers of spectators from obstructing the runners. In these cases they are given a limited amount of power over civilians, as the regular police needed the extra support to handle the large influx of tourists. As military police conscripts are trained with basic police techniques they are suitable for usage in instances such as these in Finland.

== France ==
The Gendarmerie Nationale acts as both the provost military police and one of the two national police forces of France. The Gendarmerie Maritime polices the Navy (and also acts as a coast guard and water police force) and the Gendarmerie de l'Air polices the Air Force; both are branches of the Gendarmerie Nationale. La prévôté, or gendarmerie prévôtale, is a Gendarmerie Nationale unit based out of France during war operations or when large units of the French armed forces are stationed overseas.

== Germany ==
The Feldjäger are the current military police of the German Bundeswehr. The term Feldjäger ("field rifleman" or "field hunter") has a long tradition and dates back to the mid-17th century. As the current German constitution explicitly forbids the employment of troops on German territory (except for technical assistance as part of disaster relief), Feldjäger jurisdiction applies only to military facilities and military personnel. Their motto is Suum Cuique, ("to each his own"), the motto of the Prussian Order of the Black Eagle.

During World War II, Nazi Germany had numerous military police units of the Wehrmacht. The primary units were the Feldgendarmerie, Geheime Feldpolizei and the Feldjägerkorps.

== Greece ==
Each branch of the Hellenic Armed Forces used to maintain its own police service. i.e. Stratonomia as the military police of the Hellenic Army, Naftonomia of the Hellenic Navy and Aeronomia of the Hellenic Air Force. As of 2014, all three military police entities merged to create a single 'Armed Forces Police' (Astynomia Enoplon Dynameon).

== India ==
The Corps of Military Police (CMP) is the military police of the Indian Army. In addition, the CMP is trained to handle prisoners of war and to regulate traffic, as well as to handle basic telecommunication equipment such as telephone exchanges. They can be identified by their red berets, white lanyards and belts, and they also wear a black brassard with the letters "MP" imprinted in red.

Internal policing duties in a regiment are handled by the Regimental Police, who are soldiers of the unit who are assigned to policing tasks for a short period of time. They are essentially used to regulate regimental discipline, and can be identified by a black brassard with the letters "RP" embossed in gold or white.

The Indian Air Force is policed by the Indian Air Force Police. They can be identified by their white peaked caps, white lanyards and belts (with a pistol holster). They also wear a badge over their right sleeve over which "Indian Air Force Police" is imprinted in golden thread.

The Indian Navy has the Navy Police, and they can be identified by a black brassard with the letters "NP" in gold, with the state emblem placed in between the N and the P.

== Indonesia ==
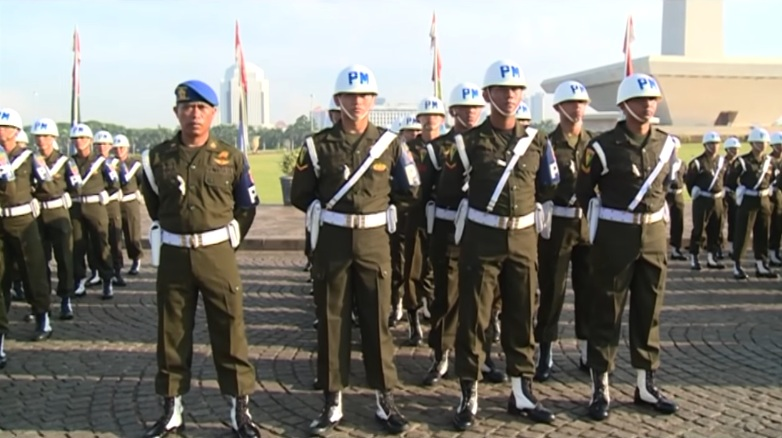
Military policemen of the army stand at ease during a ceremony at the National Monument, Central Jakarta

In Indonesia, the institution which solely has the responsibility and authority concerning the maintenance of discipline and law enforcement towards members of the Indonesian National Armed Forces is the Military Police Command (Indonesian: Pusat Polisi Militer TNI, abbreviated "Puspom TNI"), an institution directly under the auspices of the Indonesian National Armed Forces Headquarters ("Mabes TNI") which heads the three military police corps, which are the:

- Indonesian Army Military Police Command
- Indonesian Navy Military Police Command, and the
- Indonesian Air Force Military Police Command

which are responsible for enforcing law and order in the scope of the military. Other than enforcing discipline and maintaining law and order for/in the Indonesian National Armed Forces, they also conduct escort and Honour guard duties for the head of state, high-ranking military officials, and VVIPs. The military police are also tasked for supervising prisoners of war (POWs), controlling military prisoners, arresting deserters, managing military traffic, conducting access-control for military installations, issuing military driving licenses and conducting joint law enforcement operations with the civilian police, such as implementing traffic checkpoints and crime investigation to take action towards military personnel caught red-handed in violations.

In Indonesia, the term Provost is attributed only to the Regimental police which are soldiers assigned to enforce internal law, discipline, and order of a military base (usually a battalion or regiment), while the military police are known locally as Polisi Militer sometimes shortened "PM" or "POM" which have bigger authority and can arrest "Provosts" involved in crime and violations. Military Policemen are identifiable by their white belts, white Aiguillette, white helmets, and brassard worn on their upper left sleeve imprinted the word PM.

== Israel ==
The Heyl HaMishtara HaTzva'it ("Military Police Corps") is the military police of the Israel Defense Forces. It also helps monitor prisons, both those containing Israeli soldiers and Palestinian detainees.

== Italy ==
The Carabinieri is a gendarmerie force which acts as both military police and one of the three national police forces in Italy. The Guardia di Finanza also has some limited military police duties.

During World War II, Fascist Italy had the Italian African Police (PAI) in Italian North Africa and Italian East Africa.

== Japan ==
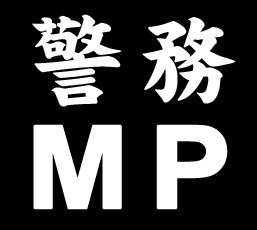
MP armband of the Japan Self-Defense Forces

During World War II, the Kempeitai were the military police of the Imperial Japanese Army and the Tokkeitai were the military police of the Imperial Japanese Navy. They also performed intelligence and secret police functions and were active in Japan and its occupied territories.

The Japan Self-Defense Forces maintain military police units (警務隊, Keimutai).

== Malaysia ==
The Kor Polis Tentera DiRaja (Royal Military Police Corps) performs military police duties in the Malaysian Army. Apart from enforcing discipline and conduct of members of the army, the corps oversees security of designated army installations, performs escort and ceremonial duties, and assists civil law enforcement authorities. The Kor Polis Tentera is also tasked with crime prevention and investigating criminal activities on Army property or by military personnel.

With its roots in the British Royal Military Police, members of the Kor Polis Tentera DiRaja also wear the distinctive red peaked cap, white lanyard and belt, as well as a black brassard with the letters "MP" imprinted.

In addition to the Kor Polis Tentera DiRaja in the Malaysian Army, both the Royal Malaysian Navy and Royal Malaysian Air Force have their own military police units. These units, known as the RMN Provost Unit and RMAF Provost Unit, respectively, are responsible for maintaining law and order and providing security within their respective branches.

== Netherlands ==
In the Netherlands, the function of military police is performed by the Koninklijke Marechaussee ("Royal Constabulary"), a separate branch of the military independent of the Army, Navy and Air Force. Besides performing military duties, the Marechaussee is also a gendarmerie force.

The word Marechaussee seems to derive from the old French name Marecheaux given to an ancient court of justice in Paris called the "Tribunal of Constables and Marshals of France". These constables and marshals were to become members of the Gendarmerie which served as a model for the police forces of both Belgium and the Netherlands. The term Marechaussee was also used for the US Army's military police during the American Revolution.

== New Zealand ==
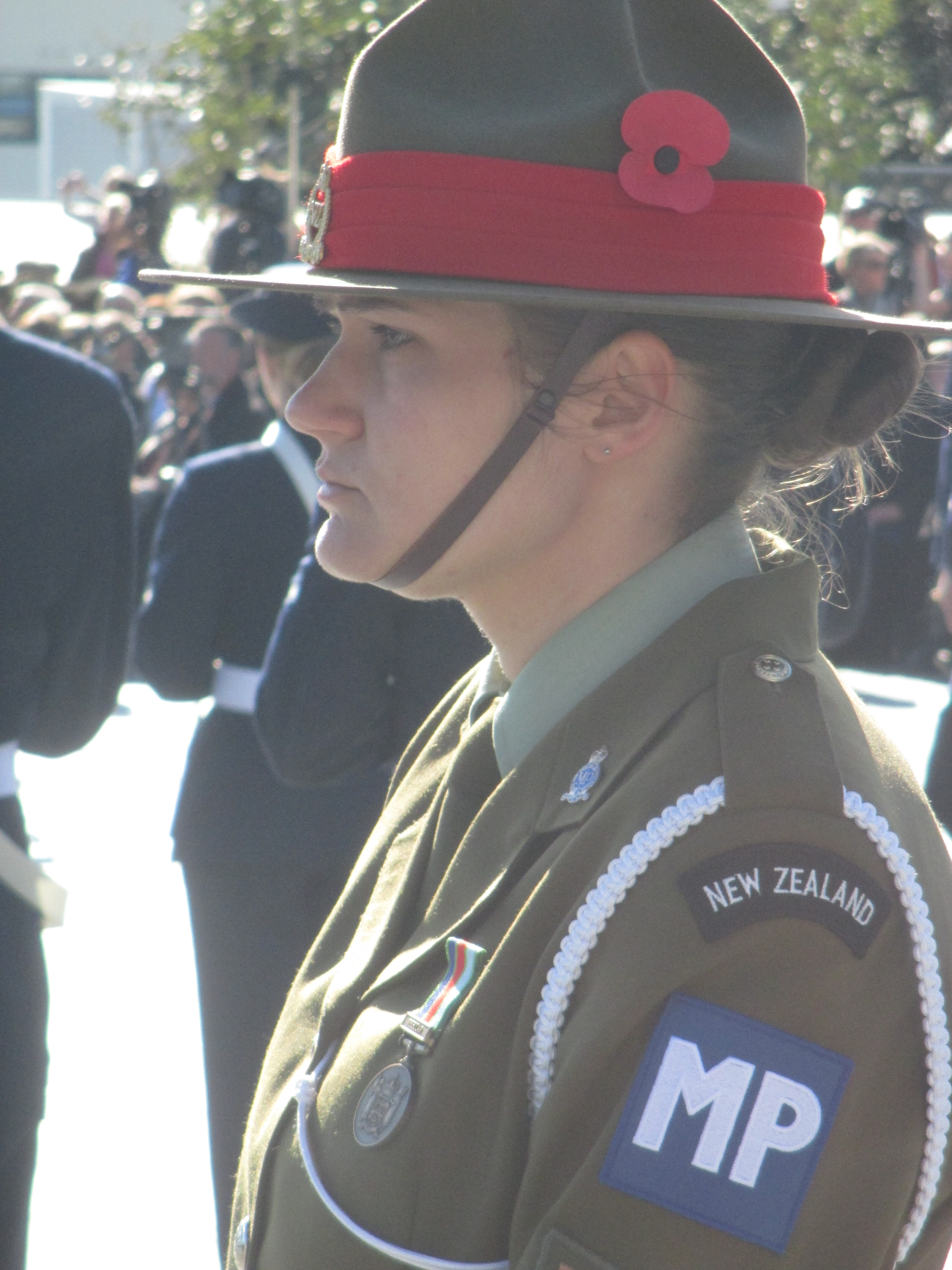
The "MP" patch identifies this woman as being a member of the Joint Military Police Unit.

Currently all three military police units operate under the newly established tri service unit of the Joint Military Police Unit (JMPU).

The military police units, RNZN Naval Police, Royal New Zealand Military Police and RNZAF Police still maintain their own separate service identity but operate under a single provost marshal and investigate offences against the Armed Forces Discipline Act 1971.

The Joint Military Police Unit operates outside of the normal Navy, Army and Air Force command chain. The Provost Marshal currently holds the rank of a colonel and she reports directly to the Vice Chief of the NZDF.

All complex and serious investigations are handled by the JMPU Special Investigations Branch (SIB). It has a similar role to the Australian Defence Force Investigative Service (ADFIS).

All JMPU personnel are identifiable by the blue and white "MP" patch they wear on their uniform and their blue beret as head dress.

== Norway ==
The Norwegian Military Police Regiment (MPREG) is the branch of the Norwegian Army responsible for policing the Norwegian Armed Forces and providing military police support to military commanders in the execution of their missions. The territorial Military Police function in Norway is carried out by the Norwegian Home Guard.

The Regimental Commander's role, responsibilities, and authority include serving as the National MP-chief/Provost Marshal and holding professional responsibility for MP capabilities within the Norwegian Armed Forces.

Current regimental structure (as of 27^{th} of August 2025):

- Provost Staff
- Armed Forces Military Police School
- MP Battalion 2 – allied reception
- MP Coy 1 - training
- MP Coy 3 – provost duties/MP stations
- Special Investigation Unit
- Close Protection Unit

The Military Police function in Norway dates back to the 13th century. The role of the Provost originates from the Army Law of 1628. However, it was not until 1902 that a corps of Military Police was established through the creation of the Cavalry Mounted Police. This was followed by the establishment of the War Police in 1916, consisting of one Detective Unit under Army High Command and six Law Enforcement Units (one for each division).

The modern Norwegian Military Police was founded on the 1^{st} of September 1940 in Dumfries, Scotland. The unit was named the Army Military Police, also known as the Norwegian Military Police (NMP).

After the Second World War, Military Police units were established within the Royal Norwegian Navy, the Royal Norwegian Air Force, and the Norwegian Home Guard. The Armed Forces Military Police School was established in 2002 with the purpose of consolidating force generation and education of the Norwegian Military Police. In 2011, the operational Military Police amalgamated in the Armed Forces Military Police Unit, which was replaced by the Military Police Regiment (MPREG) in 2025.

The historical foundation for Military Police authority, regardless of who it was executed by, has been the enforcement of military discipline and order in support of military commanders in the execution of their missions.

The Norwegian Military Police Act, entered into force on the 1^{st} of July 2024, provides the military police with police authority in order to ensure security, uphold discipline, law and order, and enable crime intervention.

- Full police authority on military grounds, and access area
- Full police authority over all military personnel outside military grounds
- Full police authority for protection of all military personnel, materiel, vehicles, and equipment outside military grounds
- Full police authority to control traffic on all grounds/roads if this will serve a military purpose
- Support the Norwegian civil police when requested
- Special investigators may investigate all military cases, and some civilian cases, led by civilian prosecutors

== Poland ==
The military police of the Siły Zbrojne Rzeczypospolitej Polskiej is called Żandarmeria Wojskowa.

== Portugal ==
In Portugal, each branch of the armed forces has its own military police force. The Portuguese Navy has the Polícia Naval (Naval Police), the Portuguese Army has the Polícia do Exército (Army Police), and the Portuguese Air Force has the Polícia Aérea (Air Police). The Air Police is an Arm of its own inside the Air Force, but the Army Police is only a speciality of the Cavalry Arm and the Naval Police is a speciality of the Marines. There is also the Republican National Guard (Portugal), a gendarmerie type police force, responsible for law enforcement in the countryside and small towns.

== Russia ==
Until 2010 The Military Commandant Service and the Military Traffiс Inspection were operated as military police forces. These branches were usually represented by soldiers and officers of particular garrison who were on duty by rotational basis.

On 2012 Ministry of Defense has established the VP which headed by a 1st deputy Minister.

This law enforcement body has united these structures in one and subordinated them to the particular command. Military Police in Russia has their own command and is not subordinated to the command of military units in particular garrisons, according to Military Police Regulations (rus. Устав военной полиции Вооруженных Сил РФ). However, garrison duty of units remains according to Garrison Regulations (rus. Устав гарнизонной и караульной службы)

== Sri Lanka ==
Each of the Sri Lankan Armed Forces has its own military police/provost branch. The Sri Lanka Army is policed by the Sri Lanka Corps of Military Police and by Regimental Police who belong to each individual regiment or corps.

The military police carry out the following missions:

- Maintenance of order and discipline: Consists of monitoring, maintaining and, if necessary, re-establishing discipline and military order. This also involves controlling stragglers and refugees in times of war and guarding and escorting prisoners of war.
- Security missions: Prevents and deters any threat to or attack against the personnel and property of the armed forces. MPs also provide VIP motorcycle escorts and honour guards, perform close protection missions, and escort classified document and money transports.

The Sri Lanka Navy is policed by the Provost Branch. The Sri Lanka Air Force is policed by the Air Force Police (AFP).

== Singapore ==
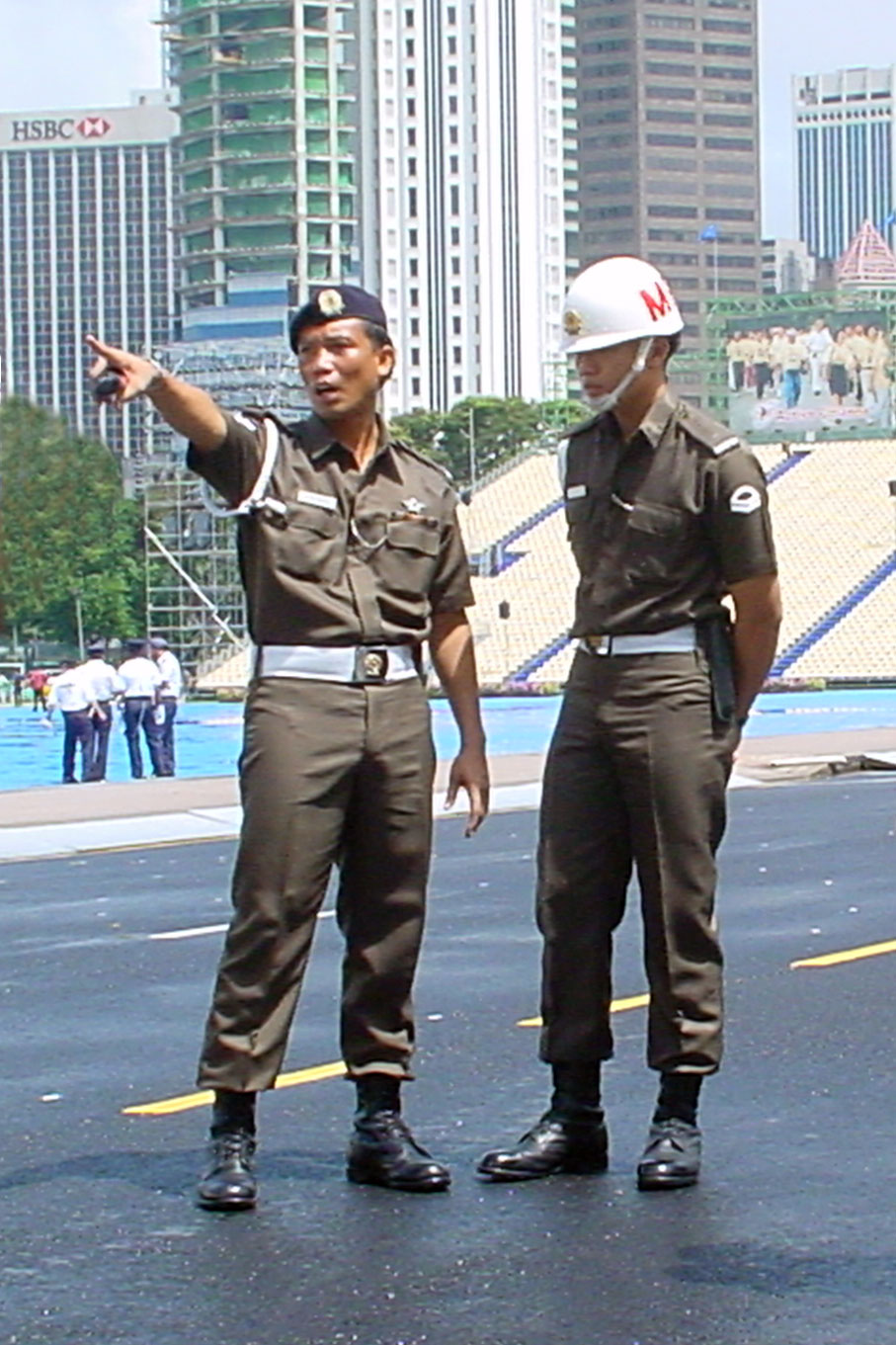
The SAFMPU providing security coverage at the Padang in Singapore during the National Day Parade in 2000

In Singapore, the Singapore Armed Forces Military Police Command serves as the military police unit of the Singapore Armed Forces, and supports the Singapore Police Force by way of collaborations, such as in the co-location of dog-training facilities for policing duties.

The Singapore Civil Defence Force has a provost unit which handles the force's security and regimental disciplinary matters. The unit is made up of full-time national servicemen and regular officers, some being seconded from the Singapore Police Force. A 3-week provost course is conducted after completing basic rescue training at the SCDF Detention Barracks. Trainees are taught basic control and restraint techniques, baton use, handcuffs and other security equipment. The provost uniform is similar to the SAF Military Police with the exception of the lanyard which is worn on the left instead and the uniform colour which is dark blue.

== Thailand ==
In Thailand, each branch of the armed forces has its own military police force (สารวัตรทหาร). The Royal Thai Navy has the Naval Military Police (สารวัตรทหารเรือ), the Royal Thai Army has the Army Military Police (สารวัตรทหารบก), and the Royal Thai Air force has the Air Force Military Police (สารวัตรทหารอากาศ).

== Turkey ==
In Turkey, the military police (Askeri İnzibat) is a very small force that handles military policing.

The larger Turkish Gendarmerie (Jandarma Genel Komutanlığı), is responsible for maintaining law and order in rural areas which do not fall under the jurisdiction of regular police forces.

== United Kingdom ==
Each of the British Armed Forces has its own military police branch.

The British Army is policed by the Royal Military Police (RMP).

The Royal Air Force is policed by the Royal Air Force Police (RAFP).

The Royal Navy is policed by the Royal Navy Police (formerly the Royal Navy Regulating Branch). The Royal Marines maintains a platoon-sized Police Troop, formerly the Royal Marines Police, which has been part of the Royal Navy Police since 2009.

Each of the three Services has its own Special Investigation Branch (SIB) to undertake investigations of a serious or complex nature. SIB investigators normally wear plain-clothes and operate in a similar to manner to civilian police CID.

All British military police are correctly named as 'Service Police' and conform to the Service Police Codes of Practice (SPCoP). Powers for all arms of the British Service Police come from Armed Forces Act 2006, which came into force in 2008.

The Military Corrective Training Centre—for all three services—at Colchester is operated by the Military Provost Staff Corps (MPS), an all-senior NCO corps which recruits only from serving personnel (but will liaise with other military and government sources where appropriate). MPS are not police and serve the same function as a prison officer. This role is additionally carried out by them on operations when handling foreign detainees at a main operating base such as Camp Bastion/Kandahar.

== United States ==
The Military Police Corps maintains discipline and enforces the law in the United States Army. The Marine Corps has the United States Marine Corps Military Police, while personnel assigned to the Master-at-Arms branch fill the same role in the United States Navy (aided by temporary members of the Shore patrol). The United States Air Force and the United States Space Force are policed by the United States Air Force Security Forces, formerly called the Air Police and then the Security Police.

Each service also maintains uniformed civilian police departments. They are referred to as Department of Defense Police (DoD Police). These police fall under each directorate they work for within the United States Department of Defense, for example: DoD Army or DoD Navy Police. The Department of the Air Force Police operate under the air provost marshal. The police officers' duties are similar to those of local civilian police officers. They enforce the Uniform Code of Military Justice (UCMJ) and federal laws, along with state laws if the state legislature of whatever state that federal peace officer is in gives them the authority to enforce state law or classifies them as a peace officer under state law, and the regulations of their particular installation.

Felony-level criminal investigations in the United States Armed Forces are carried out by separate agencies:

- Army Criminal Investigation Division (CiD)—Army (general felony crimes)
- Army Counterintelligence (CI)—Army (national security crimes)
- Marine Corps Criminal Investigation Division (CID)—Marine Corps
- Naval Criminal Investigative Service (NCIS)—Navy and Marine Corps
- Air Force Office of Special Investigations (OSI)—Air Force
- Coast Guard Investigative Service (CGIS)—Coast Guard

The Defense Criminal Investigative Service (DCIS) is a civilian agency that answers directly to the DOD as well as the Pentagon Force Protection Agency (PFPA).

The United States Constabulary was a gendarmerie force used to secure and patrol the American Zone of West Germany immediately after World War II.

=== Combat roles of military police ===
Military police in the U.S. Army, Navy, Air Force and Marine Corps, in addition to their roles as enforcers of law and order on military installations, fulfill a number of combat roles as well. Military police in Afghanistan and Iraq have been widely employed for such duties as convoy security, mounted and dismounted patrols, maritime expeditionary warfare, military working dog operations, security details for senior officers, and detainee handling. Army MPs, Navy MAs, Navy sailors who possess the Navy Enlisted Classification (NEC) Code 2008 and 9575, sailors who have completed the individual augmentee (IA) training for detention operations, and Air Force Security Forces have been widely used as prison guards in detainee facilities, whereas Marine Corps MPs focus on securing and processing detainees before passing them on to Army holding facilities.

=== Limitation of authority and jurisdiction ===
U.S. Army military police soldiers and U.S. Air Force security forces airmen are members of the armed forces and are not necessarily prohibited from exercising domestic law enforcement powers under the Posse Comitatus Act (PCA), a federal law passed in 1878. MPs may enforce civilian laws including United States Code and state law assimilated through the United States Code such as misdemeanors and traffic law with felonies being enforced through either United States Code or UCMJ. Much is based upon the suspect's status as a civilian or service member. When combined, the Posse Comitatus Act and Insurrection Act place significant limits on presidential power to use the military in a law-enforcement capacity with the exception of military police forces. With regard to reporting crime to federal courts, military police are officially designated as “federal law enforcement officers”. The PCA directly applies only to the Army and Air Force, without mentioning the Navy and Marine Corps. The Navy and Marine Corps are also not limited from enforcing domestic laws in accordance with DoD policy and regulations.

The military forces that are explicitly exempt from the act and have expanded law enforcement missions are the United States Coast Guard, as its mission includes maritime law enforcement duties; United States Space Force, which has authority to conduct law enforcement regarding space-related activities; and Army and Air National Guard units while under state authority. Army and Air National Guard troops are not exempt from Posse Comitatus while they are serving under federal Title 10 orders.

== Vietnam ==
In Vietnam, the Military Provost Company of the 144th Brigade is under the command of the General Staff of the Vietnam People's Army. The provosts are responsible for guarding, protecting and patrolling around the headquarters of the Ministry of Defence and army offices nearby. They are also responsible for supervising military laws on soldiers and officers. Even though the 144th Brigade is the highest level division in the Military Provost force of Vietnam, however, there seems to be no unified command for the Military Provost under the General Staff, the Ministry of Defense or another General Department within the Ministry. According to Vietnamese law, professional military provost forces are organized in the General Department, Military Regions, Corps and Military Command of provinces, cities and municipalities to operate regularly in the area responsible while non-professional military provost forces organized at the division level and above (including agencies, factories, enterprises, and economic military units) and only operate when there is a mission requirement. There are several known military provost units such as the 31st Military Provost Battalion of Ho Chi Minh City Military Command, the said 144th Brigade, and the 103rd Military Provost Battalion of the High Command of Capital Hanoi. Besides the provost units, there are also the military investigative agencies that function similarly to the provosts, such as the Military Criminal Investigation Agency and the Military Investigative Security Agency within the Defense Ministry.
