= Clive Hulme =

Recipient of the Victoria Cross (1911–1982)

Alfred Clive Hulme VC
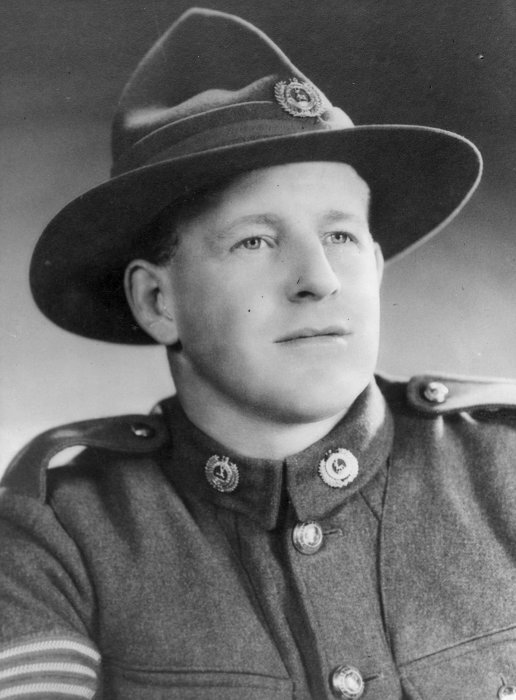
- A studio photograph of Clive Hulme as a sergeant
- Born: 24 January 1911; Dunedin, New Zealand
- Died: 2 September 1982 (aged 71); Te Puke, New Zealand
- Relatives: Denny Hulme (son)
- Military career
- Allegiance: New Zealand
- Branch: New Zealand Military Forces
- Service years: 1940–1942; 1942–1943
- Rank: Warrant Officer
- Unit: 23rd Battalion
- Conflicts: Second World War; Battle of Greece; Battle of Crete; Home Front
- Awards: Victoria Cross

Alfred Clive Hulme VC (24 January 1911 – 2 September 1982) was a soldier in the New Zealand Military Forces and a recipient of the Victoria Cross (VC), the highest award of the British Commonwealth, for gallantry "in the face of the enemy". He received the VC for his actions in the Battle of Crete during the Second World War.

Born in Dunedin, New Zealand, Hulme enlisted in the 2nd New Zealand Expeditionary Force (2NZEF) shortly after the outbreak of the Second World War and was posted to the 23rd Battalion. By the end of 1940, he was the battalion's provost sergeant. He was with the battalion during the invasion of Greece and the subsequent Battle of Crete. From 20 to 30 May, he was heavily involved in the fighting on Crete, performing a number of actions that saw him recognised with an award of the VC. Wounded during the final days of the battle, he was repatriated to New Zealand. He served on the Home Front for several months before being discharged from the military. In later life, he ran a cartage company. He died in 1982.

== Early life ==
Alfred Clive Hulme was born on 24 January 1911 in the city of Dunedin, New Zealand, was the eldest of four sons to Harold Clive Hulme, a clerk, and his wife Florence née Matthews. Preferring to be known as Clive, he was educated at Eastern Hutt School. Powerfully built, he was interested in wrestling in his youth. After finishing his schooling, he worked as a farm labourer. In 1934 he married Rona Marjorie née Murcott; the couple later had a son and a daughter.

== Second World War ==
On the outbreak of the Second World War, Hulme was working in Nelson. A few months later, on 22 January 1940, he enlisted in the 2nd New Zealand Expeditionary Force (2NZEF) and was posted to the 23rd Battalion. His unit trained at Burnham Military Camp, near Christchurch, and he soon attained the rank of corporal. On 1 May 1940, he departed New Zealand with the battalion as part of a convoy transporting the 5th Infantry Brigade, 2nd New Zealand Division, to the Middle East. Later in the month, the invasion of the Low Countries prompted the diversion of the convoy to England. While at sea, Hulme was promoted to sergeant and he was appointed the battalion's provost sergeant.

Arriving in England in June, the 23rd Battalion, along with the rest of the brigade, formed a mobile reserve tasked with defending England from a possible invasion. It remained there until early 1941, at which time the brigade embarked for Egypt. Hulme's battalion was only in Egypt for a brief time before it was moved to Greece, along with the rest of the 2nd New Zealand Division, in anticipation of an invasion by German forces. Following the commencement of the Battle of Greece, the 23rd Battalion did not encounter enemy action until 16 April, when German infantry began to probe its defences at the Olympus Pass. It withdrew the next day, with its rearguard covering the retreat of the entire brigade. Within days, all of the 5th Brigade had been evacuated to Crete, with the 23rd Battalion arriving on the island on 25 April 1941.

=== Crete ===
While on Crete, Hulme was attached to the divisional field punishment centre at Platanias, supervising soldiers who were being punished for criminal activity or breaches of discipline. On 20 May 1941, when German Fallschirmjäger (paratroopers) began landing on the island to begin the Battle of Crete, Hulme armed the soldiers in his charge and led them in efforts to deal with the Germans. Over the next two days, operating largely on his own, he stalked and eliminated several snipers. During this time, he came across a German at the punishment centre, killed him and then took his camouflage smock and sniper rifle. This enabled him to deceive German soldiers on his subsequent stalking missions.

Hulme reattached himself to the 23rd Battalion on 22 May and soon found himself leading attacks on German positions and acting as a messenger. While making his way to the headquarters of the 5th Infantry Brigade, he came across a party of New Zealanders who had been made prisoners of war and were under guard. Unable to use his rifle for fear of hitting one of the prisoners, he instead crept up and bayoneted the sentry. When the town of Galatas fell to the Germans, Hulme was one of those involved in its recapture on 25 May. A machine gun post in a schoolhouse was holding up his platoon, and Hulme went forward to destroy it with grenades. Afterwards, while clearing the town, he threw a grenade into a cellar that he believed was occupied by German soldiers; it transpired that it sheltered several Cretan villagers. The next day, he was advised of the death of his brother, Harold Charles Hulme (18 May 1914 – 26 May 1941), killed while also fighting in Crete with the 19th Battalion. Incensed by this news, he sought retribution against the Germans. As the 23rd Battalion began retreating from Galatas, Hulme stayed behind in a position to snipe at an advancing patrol, killing three soldiers. Later on, as the Allies began withdrawing from their positions in preparation for an evacuation from Crete, the 23rd Battalion formed part of the rearguard. When they reached Stylos after an overnight march, it was discovered that a group of Germans were advancing to a nearby ridge overlooking the battalion. Hulme was ordered to get his own party of men to the ridge ahead of the enemy. One of the first to the ridge, he used his sniper rifle and threw grenades to keep the Germans at bay. His conduct provided a much needed morale boost for his fellow soldiers, already exhausted by their march to Stylos. During this action, he was wounded in the arm.

On 28 May, German snipers infiltrated the New Zealanders' position and opened fire on a conference of senior officers at the headquarters of the 5th Infantry Brigade. Hulme volunteered to deal with them and, with his company commander observing through field glasses, successfully eliminated a party of five snipers while wearing the camouflage smock that he had acquired earlier in the battle. At one stage during this mission, the smock fooled the Germans into thinking he was part of their group. The next day he continued his sniping exploits, killing three more Germans and destroying a mortar and its four-man crew. However, he was wounded in the process, receiving a bullet through his shoulder. Despite his wounds, he stayed with the battalion despite orders to the contrary. He helped organise the retreating Allied forces, directing traffic and collecting stragglers. By 30 May, the 23rd Battalion was at Sphakia from where it, along with Hulme, was evacuated to Egypt.

For Hulme's actions on Crete, his battalion commander, Lieutenant Colonel Leckie, recommended him for the Victoria Cross (VC). Instituted in 1856, the VC was the highest gallantry award that could be bestowed on military personnel of the British Empire. The nomination was supported by several officers, including Hulme's company commander as well as the commander of the 5th Infantry Brigade, Brigadier James Hargest, and it was duly awarded. The citation for his VC, published in the London Gazette dated 10 October 1941, read:

Serjeant Hulme exhibited most outstanding and inspiring qualities of leadership, initiative, skill, endurance, and most conspicuous gallantry and devotion to duty from the commencement of the heavy fighting in Crete, on 20th May, 1941, until he was wounded in action 28th May, 1941. On ground overlooking Maleme Aerodrome on 20th and 21st May he personally led parties of his men from the area held by the forward position and destroyed enemy organised parties who had established themselves out in front of our position, from which they brought heavy rifle, machine-gun and mortar fire to bear on our defensive posts. Numerous snipers in the area were dealt with by Serjeant Hulme personally; 130 dead were counted here. On 22nd, 23rd and 24th May, Serjeant Hulme was continually going out alone or with one or two men and destroying enemy snipers. On 25th May, when Serjeant Hulme had rejoined his battalion, this unit counter-attacked Galatos Village. The attack was partially held up by a large party of the enemy holding the school, from which they were inflicting heavy casualties on our troops. Serjeant Hulme went forward alone, threw grenades into the school and so disorganised the defence, that the counter-attack was able to proceed successfully.

On Tuesday, 27th May, when our troops were holding a defensive line at Suda Bay during the final retirement, five enemy snipers had worked into position on the hillside overlooking the flank of the Battalion line. Serjeant Hulme volunteered to deal with the situation, and stalked and killed the snipers in turn. He continued similar work successfully through the day.

On 28th May at Stylos, when an enemy heavy mortar was severely bombing a very important ridge held by the Battalion rearguard troops, inflicting severe casualties, Serjeant Hulme, on his own initiative, penetrated the enemy lines, killed the mortar crew of four, put the mortar out of action, and thus very materially assisted the withdrawal of the main body through Stylos. From the enemy mortar position he then worked onto the left flank and killed three snipers who were causing concern to the rearguard. This made his score of enemy snipers 33 stalked and shot. Shortly afterwards Serjeant Hulme was severely wounded in the shoulder while stalking another sniper. When ordered to the rear, in spite of his wound, he directed traffic under fire and organised stragglers of various units into section groups.

— London Gazette, No. 35306, 10 October 1941.

=== Repatriation to New Zealand ===
The wounds Hulme received on Crete saw him evacuated to New Zealand for treatment and rehabilitation. On his return to Nelson on 23 October 1941, he was honoured with a civic reception. On 2 February 1942, he was presented with his VC by the Governor-General of New Zealand, Cyril Newall, in a ceremony at Nelson. Hulme's VC was one of two to be awarded to New Zealanders for their actions during the Battle of Crete. (Note: The other New Zealand VC recipient for actions on Crete was Charles Upham.)

Hulme was declared medically unfit in February 1942 and discharged from the 2NZEF, much to his displeasure as he was keen to resume his war service. However, three months later he was recalled to active duty for service with the New Zealand Military Forces. He served on the home front until September 1943 at which time he was discharged again from the military, having been promoted to warrant officer.

== Later life ==
After the war he lived at Pongakawa, near Te Puke, running a cartage company and becoming involved with water divining and oil prospecting. Over the years, the effect of his war wounds became more pronounced with his ability to use his wrists declining and his forearm becoming withered. By 1960, he was on a full disability pension. He was also emotionally affected by the Cretan deaths he had accidentally caused at Galatas. He died at Te Puke on 2 September 1982, and was buried in the civilian section of the Dudley-Vercoe Cemetery in the town. He was survived by his wife and children. His son, Denny Hulme, was active in motorsports, winning several Grands Prix and becoming the Formula One World Champion in 1967.

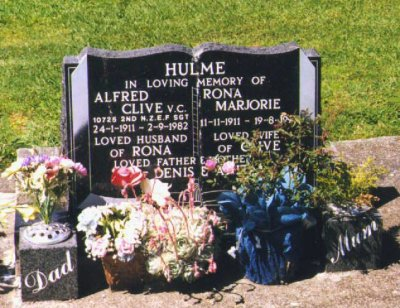
Hulme's grave

== Medals and legacy ==
In addition to the VC, Hulme was entitled to the 1939–1945 Star, the Africa Star, the Defence Medal, the War Medal 1939–1945, the New Zealand War Service Medal, the 1953 Coronation Medal, the 1977 Jubilee Medal and the Greek Commemorative War Medal 1940–1941. Hulme's VC remains in the ownership of his family, but in 1999 it was loaned to the National Army Museum in Waiouru, for display for ten years. On 2 December 2007, his VC was one of nine that were among nearly a hundred medals stolen from the museum. On 16 February 2008, New Zealand Police announced all the medals had been recovered as a result of a NZ$300,000 reward offered by Michael Ashcroft and Tom Sturgess.

In recent times, Hulme's use of an acquired German parachutists' smock during some of his stalking exploits on Crete has been criticised. Military historians Glyn Harper and Colin Richardson, in their 2007 book covering New Zealand recipients of the VC, noted that this was against the rules of war. This prompted calls for an apology to the families of those killed by Hulme and caused upset to his daughter, who pointed out when "war is on, war is on – and you do what you have to do".
