= Askeri İnzibat =

Turkish military police

Askeri İnzibat Askeri İnzibat
- Abbreviation: AS. İZ.

Jurisdictional structure
- Operations jurisdiction: Turkey
- General nature: Military provost

Operational structure
- Parent agency: Turkish Armed Forces

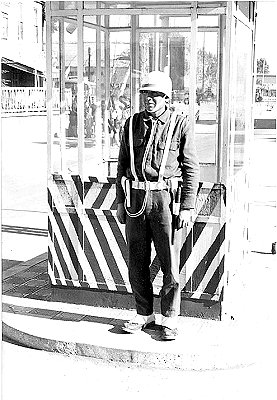
Askeri İnzibat member between 1972-3 in Samsun

The Askeri İnzibat, is the military police of the Turkish Armed Forces; it constitutes a very small, dedicated force that handles provost duties.

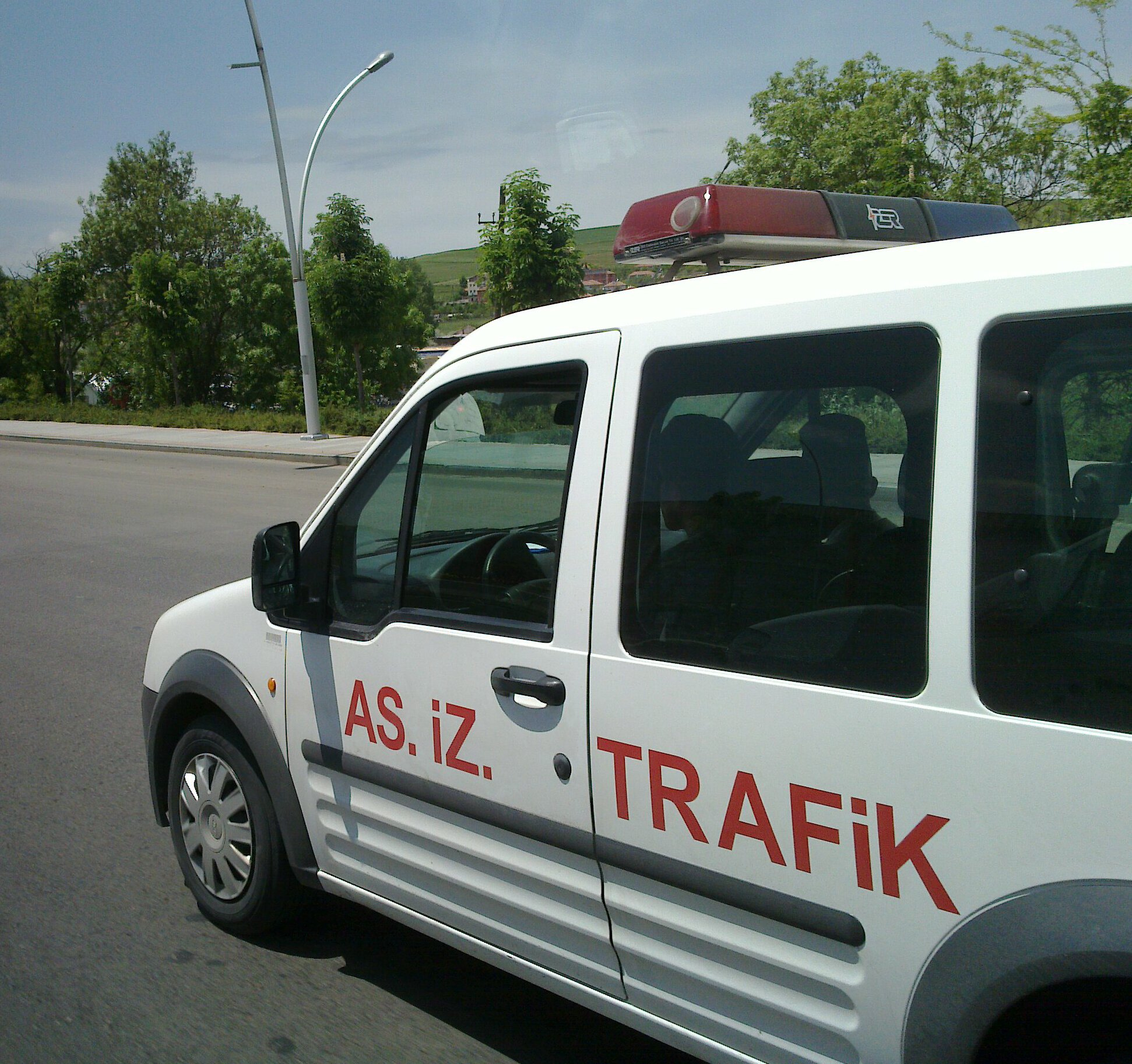
Askeri İnzibat traffic police car

Their area of jurisdiction is limited to military bases. Some of the duties they perform include; monitoring criminal activity and traffic within bases, identifying draft dodgers and VIP security to commanders. They can be identified using the very obvious “AS. İZ.”, printed in large letters across the front of their helmets or armbands.
