= Provost sergeant =

Non-commissioned officer associated with military police

A provost sergeant is a non-commissioned officer associated with military police.

== United Kingdom and Commonwealth realm ==
In the British Army and land forces of the Commonwealth, a provost sergeant is the non-commissioned officer in charge of the regimental provost staff (or regimental police) and is responsible to the regimental sergeant major for the maintenance of good order and military discipline in a regiment or battalion. Like other members of the regimental police, the provost sergeant is a member of the regiment or corps in which they serve and not a member of the Royal Military Police. A provost sergeant normally holds the military rank of sergeant, the provost sergeant title being an appointment and not a rank. A provost sergeant wears no distinctive trade badge. They can, however, be identified by the brassard they wear on their uniform, which carries the letters "PS" or "RP" as well as sergeant's stripes.

== United States ==
In the United States Army Military Police Corps or United States Marine Corps Military Police, the title of provost sergeant typically refers to the operations sergeant in charge of the staff of the Provost Marshal office or the NCO in charge of an MP station. The position is commonly held by a sergeant major or master gunnery sergeant, but may also be held by a sergeant first class or master sergeant. U.S. Army provost sergeants cannot be recognized by any specific insignia, and few provost sergeants even wear the distinctive military police identification patch on their Army Combat Uniform.

== See also ==
- Provost Marshal
