= Regimental police =

Military provost role

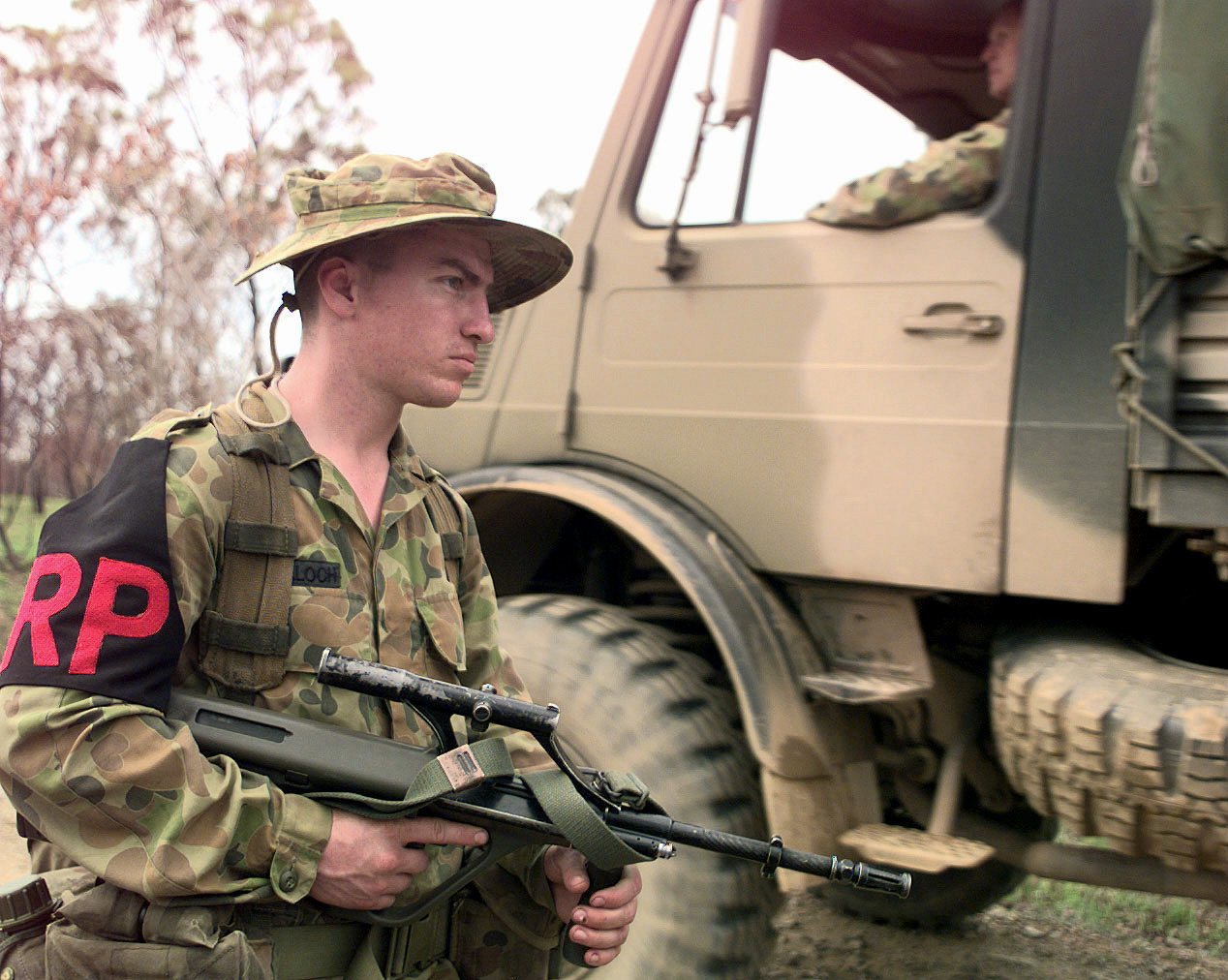
Regimental Policeman of the Australian Army's 9th Royal Queensland Regiment, holding an F88 5.56mm rifle, manning a security check point during exercise Crocodile '99 in the Shoalwater Bay Training Area, Queensland, Australia.

Regimental police or regimental provost (RP) are military personnel responsible for regimental discipline enforcement and unit custody in the British Army, other Commonwealth armies and some armed forces structured in the British tradition. They belong to the regiment or corps in which they enforce discipline rather than the Royal Military Police or its equivalent.

== United Kingdom ==
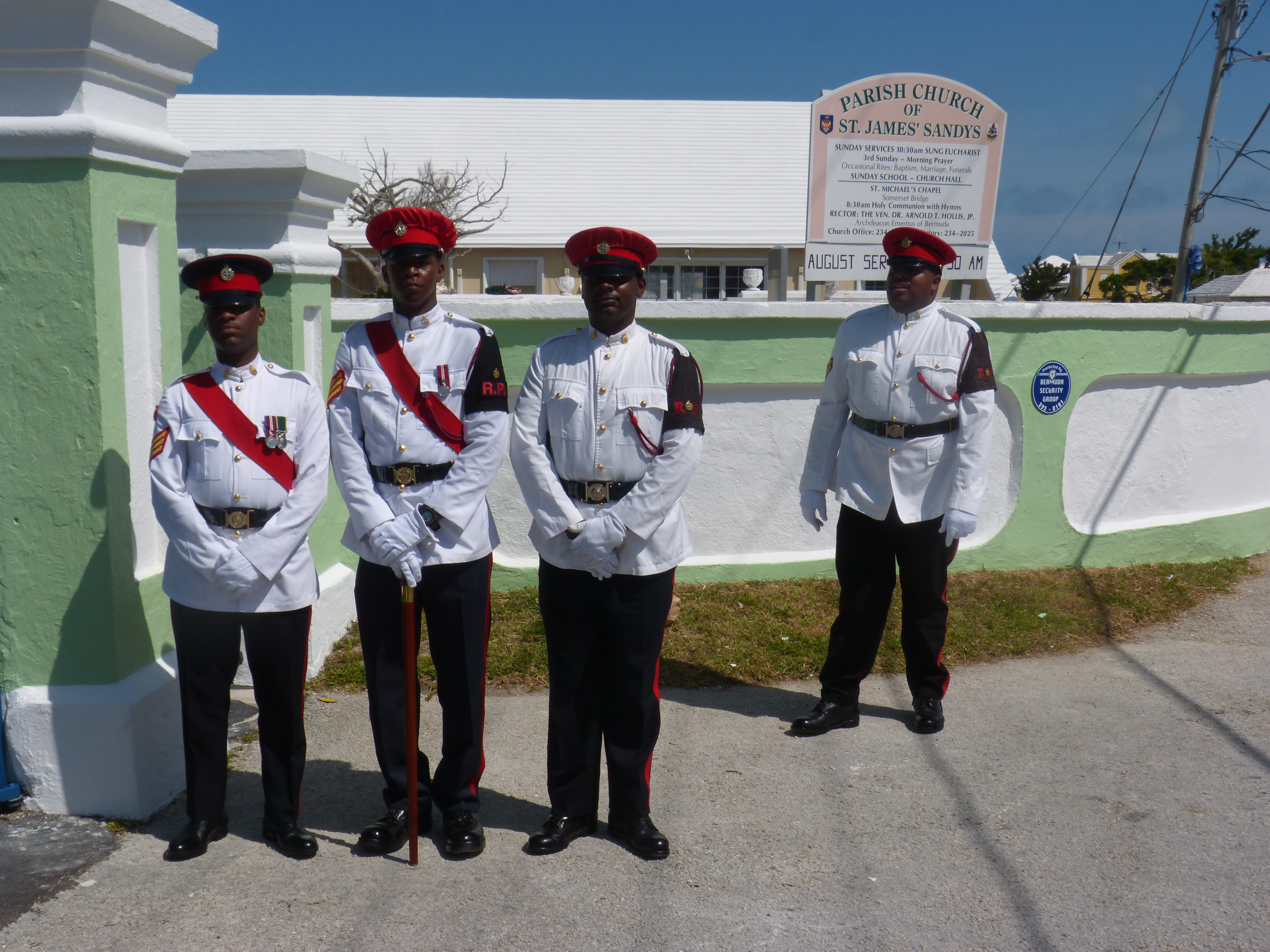
Regimental Police (with brassards) of the Royal Bermuda Regiment of the British Army in White No. 3 Warm Weather Ceremonial Dress.

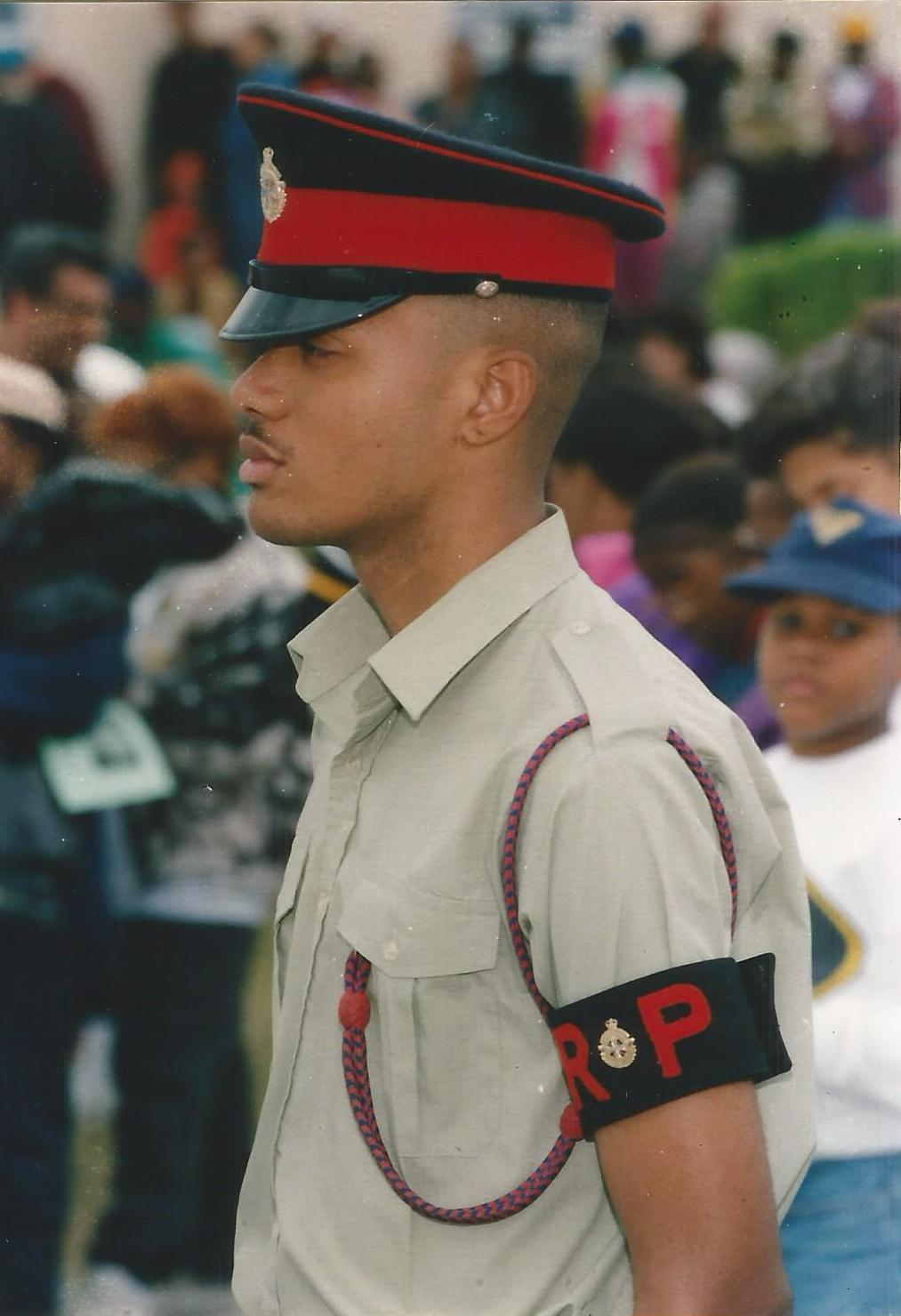
A Royal Bermuda Regiment Regimental Policeman

Properly called Regimental Provost Staff in the United Kingdom, most Army battalions and regiments and the Royal Marines Commandos have an RP section, usually headed by the Regimental Provost Sergeant, who operates under the authority of the Regimental Sergeant Major (RSM). They are normally responsible for the maintenance of good order and military discipline, with all criminal offences being passed to the specialists of the Royal Military Police.

Members of a regiment's Provost Section can be identified by the brassards they wear, which carry the letters "RP". Unlike Service Police, RPs carry no warrant card and have no powers of arrest greater than those of citizen's arrest. They are not police officers/constables/service police and serve no policing function.

=== Regimental Duties ===
In some Regiments/Corps, the role is now known as "Regimental Duties" and wear a "RD" brassard or shoulder patch. The role is largely the same, but might more accurately reflect their role, as they are not service policemen, but more soldiers who work for the Regimental Sergeant Major (RSM) and are responsible for camp discipline and security, as outlined above.

== Singapore ==
The roles of the Regimental Policemen (RP) in the Singapore Armed Forces are similar, in that they too enforce discipline and are responsible for the security of the base they are assigned to. The Regimental Policemen that once used to protect all camps and bases have been progressively replaced by Security Troopers. As of April 2011, all Regimental Policemen have been replaced by Security Troopers. These Security Troopers are better trained than the original RPs. Security Troopers are Operational Combat Soldiers with special Security Training. They are usually Full-time National Servicemen.

All Security Troopers are centrally trained and qualified by 8th Battalion, Singapore Infantry Regiment at Clementi Camp before the majority are being sent to the various Army camps all over Singapore to serve their duties as part the 8th Battalion Singapore Infantry Regiment (8SIR), while a selected minority are posted to the Republic of Singapore Air Force Force Protection Squadrons or the Republic of Singapore Navy Base Defence Squadrons to serve their duties. The Army and Air Force Security Troopers (ST) maintain the name Security Troopers. However, Security Troopers posted to the Navy are called Sea Soldiers to reflect the role they perform. At the core, regardless whether they continue to serve at 8SIR, or posted to Air Force or Navy, all these soldiers are Security Troopers. All Security Troopers undergo eleven weeks of training before they are qualified as Security Troopers.

Two months before the majority of the Security Troopers from 8SIR mark their end of two year full time national service, these security troopers from 8SIR shall undergo National Service Transition Training (NSTT) at Clementi Camp to train themselves to serve as Infantryman for their subsequent reservist training. Their Air Force and Navy Counterparts remain to serve as Security Troopers and Sea Soldier respectively for their subsequent reservist training. It may be of interest to note that Regimental Police used to be trained at the Military Police Training School (MPTS) & 2 PDF Training Centre before 8 SIR took on the role to raise Security Troopers for the SAF.

The working hours vary depending to operational requirements. They are easily identified by a black brassard with 'SECURITY TROOPER' in orange wording worn on their right arm.

Air Force RPs were once called Field Defence Troopers and Navy RPs, now Security Troopers, are still called Sea Soldiers. They are organized at the squadron level. After completing the RP training, they would proceed to a twelve weeks Field Defence Course (FDC), which includes rigorous physical and mental training, as well as teaching advanced security and fighting techniques before they were replaced by Security Troopers. They were trained in small arms, less-lethal weaponry and crew-served weapons. In the final theory exam in FDC, trainees must pass the Military Security Knowledge Exam (MSKE) in order to pass out. FD Squadrons are organized at the battalion level during wartime, and normally field reinforced company-sized units. This has all changed since the Security Troopers have replaced all RP. 8SIR now performs all the training mentioned less the context specific training and qualifies all Security Troopers for Army, Navy and Air Force.

Security Troopers work alongside Military Policemen from 8SIR. MPs have greater powers of arrest and detention. These MPs operate in a manner dependent on the local base security, carrying out normal duties within the unit according to their rank, or deployed solely to perform access control into the base at key entry points.

== Sri Lanka ==
In the Sri Lanka Army, regiments and corps have Regimental Policemen (RP) assigned to soldiers to maintain discipline and security with bases and barracks. When serving as RPs, the soldiers will wear hackle, RP arm band, white leather/web belt, white anklets and cane of 18 inches in length per the regimental pattern.

== Indonesia ==
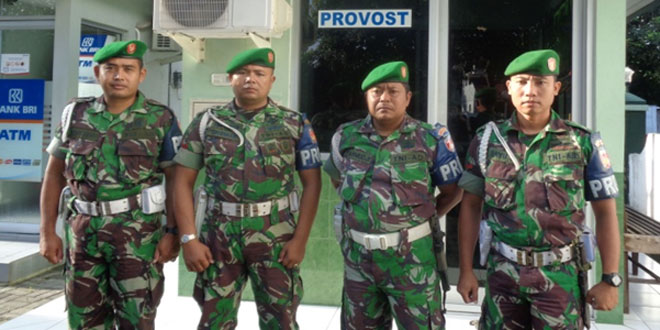
Indonesian Army provosts pose outside their Guardhouse

Although not part of the Commonwealth, in the Indonesian National Armed Forces (TNI), the Regimental Police are known as "Provosts" or in Indonesian known locally as Provos which have the duties and responsibilities in the enforcement of internal discipline, law and order, and conduct access control for a battalion or regiment. They are separate from the Military Police because they have no authority outside of their battalion/regiment (except for certain situations).

Provosts are posted at the entrances of a military base and are identifiable by their white belts, white lanyards, and wear a dark blue brassard bearing the word "PROV" worn on their upper left sleeve. Soldiers who are selected to become Provosts are usually picked based on their big/tall posture, discipline, firmness, and attitude which can be dependent upon by the battalion/regiment commander in terms of implementing internal security and internal discipline enforcement. Soldiers who are caught red handed by Provosts conducting serious criminal offences are handed to the Military Police for further investigation.

Soldiers who are selected to become Provosts are sent to undergo a 6-week training program which focuses on the education and training concerning Regimental policing tasks, which consists of the education regarding law and constitution, physical security, enforcement of discipline, maintenance of rules and management of military prisoners. Provosts are also responsible to check visitors coming into a military base.

== Hong Kong ==
The Regimental Police (traditional Chinese:軍團警察) in the Royal Hong Kong Regiment was an internal policing force to provide security and law and order within the regiment.

== Belgium ==
Most units at battalion level have a small Regimental Police detachment. In the Belgian forces, duties tend to be limited to providing access control and ensuring general base security during normal working hours, with special security teams taking over out of hours. Belgian Regimental Police belong to the unit that they police and wear a black brassard bearing the red letters 'RP' on the left upper arm together with a white webbing belt.

== See also ==
- Military police
- Provost (military police)
- Military police of the United Kingdom
- Commandant's Service
