= Military Police Corps (Indonesia) =

Agency within the Indonesian National Armed Forces

Joint Service Military Police Center of the Indonesian National Armed Forces Pusat Polisi Militer Tentara Nasional Indonesia
- Logo of Puspom TNI
- Common name: PM; Blue Berets (Baret biru)
- Abbreviation: Puspom TNI

Agency overview
- Formed: May 4, 2015

Jurisdictional structure
- Operations jurisdiction: Indonesia
- General nature: Military provost

Operational structure
- Agency executives: AVM Agung Handoko, Commandant and Provost Marshal Military Police Corps; Brig.Gen. Benyamin, Deputy Commandant and Deputy Provost Marshal Military Police Corps
- Parent agency: Indonesian National Armed Forces

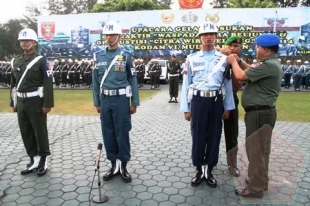
Military policemen (Army, Navy, and Air Force) from the three services within the Indonesian National Armed Forces stand at attention during a ceremony

The Puspom TNI or Joint Military Police Center of the Indonesian National Armed Forces (Indonesian: Pusat Polisi Militer Tentara Nasional Indonesia) is one of the central executive agencies within the TNI which has the role of administering administrative assistance to the army, navy, and air force as embodiment and guidance through the operation of military police functions. Puspom TNI oversees the three military police organizations which are the Army Military Police, Naval Military Police, and Air Force Military Police.

The military police of Indonesia perform duties in the area of law enforcement (including investigation of crime) involving members of the military and may coordinate with other law enforcement agencies, such as the Indonesian National Police (Polri) and/or the Corruption Eradication Commission (KPK).

The military police of Indonesia are not considered as a gendarmerie, as it is only responsible solely to enforce discipline and law and order towards members of the armed forces of all ranks.

Highest position in the Military Police Corps is Provost Marshal of Military Police, a position held by a 2-star general/admiral/marshal from the military police corps of any of each service branch.

== History ==
Prior to 4 May 2015, the military police units were only present within each of the armed forces branches (Army, Navy and Air force). At the TNI headquarters level, the special staff officer (which is held by the army military police commander) was appointed as the main aide and advisor to TNI commander (Panglima TNI) regarding military policing affairs. On 4 May 2015, the commander of the Armed Forces Gen. Moeldoko reorganized the military police units of the three branches, he commanded the special staff officer to be formed as a Military Police Center (Puspom TNI) to improve law and order within all of the three branches within the armed forces. Since then, the Puspom TNI became the highest military police authority organization with the armed forces (TNI) overseeing the military police units of the three branches.

== Duties and tasks ==
The main duties and tasks of the Military Police in Indonesia are to conduct:

1. Criminal Investigation and Physical Security
2. Law enforcement
3. Enforcement of Military Discipline and Order
4. Investigation
5. Management of Military Prisoners
6. Management of prisoners of war
7. State Protocol responsibilities, including as guards of honour
8. Regulating military traffic and issuing military driving licenses

The duties and tasks mentioned above are to be conducted in/for the scope of the Indonesian National Armed Forces.

In Indonesia, the Military Police does not have authority towards civilians as it is the primary duty of the Indonesian National Police (Polri), and in the other hand, the National Police does not have authority towards active members of the armed forces except accompanied by the Military police. If a serviceman or woman is caught red-handed by the civilian police, then the violator will be sent to the Military Police or the Military Police would be informed of it.

The Army, Navy, and Air force have their own Military Police unit which focuses on their own branches, but any Military policemen from either branch can take action towards military members from a different branch if caught red-handed, then the violator will be sent to the Military police of their branch. The Military Police in Indonesia are known locally as Polisi Militer sometimes shortened "PM" or "POM".

== Executive agencies under the supervision of the Puspom TNI ==
Each armed forces branch has its own executive agency regarding military policing affairs, which are as follows:

1. Army Military Police Center (Pusat Polisi Militer TNI Angkatan Darat abbreviated Puspomad)
2. Navy Military Police Center (Pusat Polisi Militer TNI Angkatan Laut abbreviated Puspomal)
3. Air Force Military Police Center (Pusat Polisi Militer TNI Angkatan Udara abbreviated Puspomau)

The Puspom TNI as a centralized-command of the Military Police corps oversees the three military police branches (shown above) as a compound unit within the armed forces organization. The members in the Puspom TNI originates from the three military police corps.

== Uniforms ==
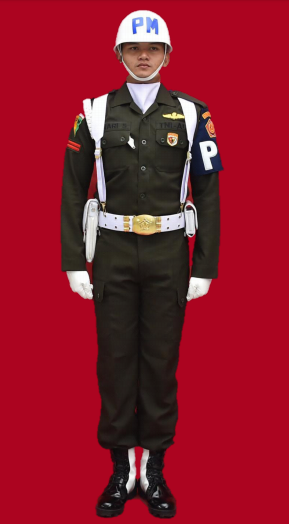
The full dress uniform of the Army Military Police Center

The uniforms worn by the Military police are different for the three unit branches. The Army Military Police wear dark green, the Navy Military Police wear blue-gray and the Air Force Military Police wear light blue. The beret of the three Military police corps of Indonesia is the same which is blue, dragged to the left with the Military police symbol on the right side when worn. Military policemen are identifiable by their white belts, white lanyards, white helmets, and brassard worn on their upper left sleeve imprinted the word "PM".

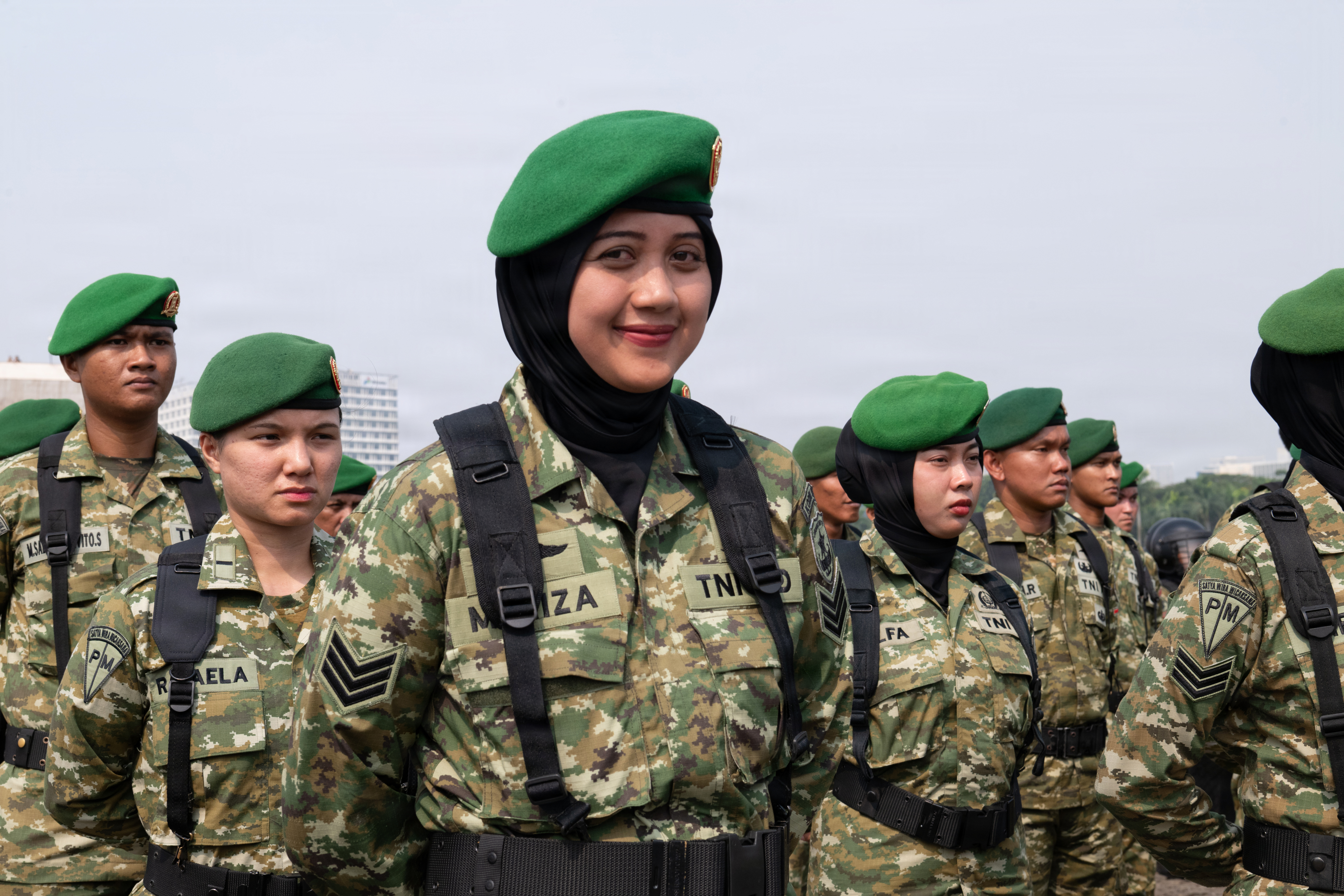
Indonesian Army Military Police personnel outfitted with "TNI PRIMA" camouflage

Military policemen have different types of uniforms. The uniform worn during training and operations is the Disruptive Pattern Material camouflage uniform—now will be phased out with "TNI PRIMA" camouflage uniform. while during law enforcement duties, the non-camouflage uniform is worn. To distinguish military members between Military policemen when wearing the camouflage uniform can be noticed by the white Aiguillette worn on their uniform, which indicates a member of the Military police.

== See also ==
- Army Military Police Corps (Indonesia)
- Indonesian National Police (Polri)
- Indonesian National Armed Forces
- Provost
- Paspampres
