= Brassard =

Armband that is part of a uniform

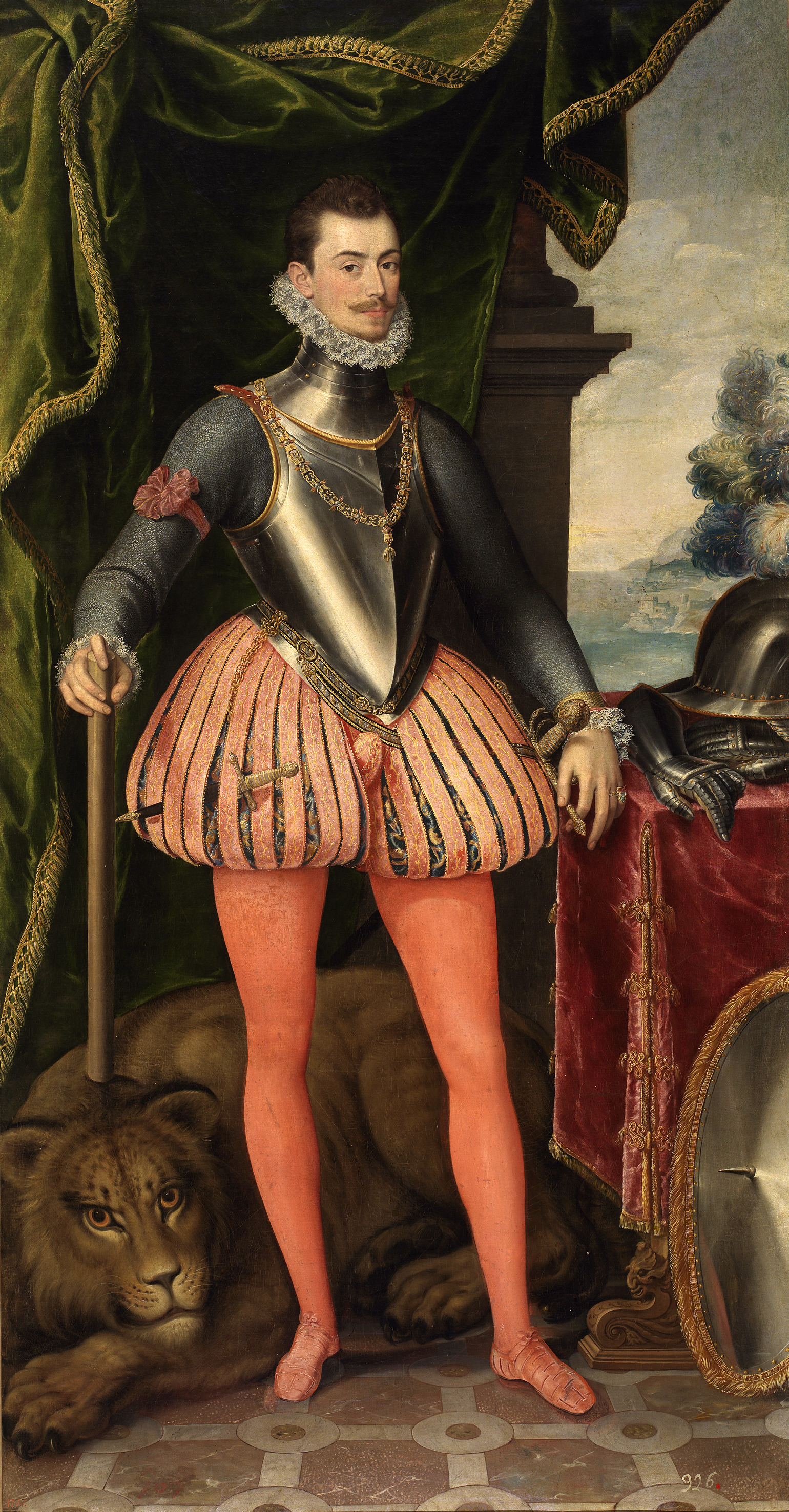
John of Austria wearing a Spanish Army brassard with a cockade.

A brassard or armlet is an armband or piece of cloth or other material worn around the upper arm; the term typically refers to an item of uniform worn as part of military uniform or by police or other uniformed persons. Unit, role, rank badges or other insignia are carried on it instead of being stitched into the actual clothing. The brassard, when spread out, may be roughly rectangular in shape, where it is worn merely around the arm; it may also be a roughly triangular shape, in which case the brassard is also attached to a shoulder strap. The term is originally French, deriving from bras meaning "arm".

Brassards are also used with the uniforms of organizations which are not military, but which are influenced by and styled upon the military, such as police, emergency services, volunteer services, or militaristic societies and political parties.

== Use ==
A brassard is often used:

- to temporarily attach insignia, such as rank, to clothing not normally bearing insignia (such as civilian clothing or a military mechanic's coveralls); For example, when French police officers work in plainclothes or are off-duty and carrying a firearm, they must wear a red 'Police' brassard.
- to temporarily attach insignia to a uniform for a limited time, such as the insignia for an "officer of the day" or "duty officer"; or for uniforms expected to have a high turnover of either wearer or insignia borne, such as those of cadets or members of other youth organizations. Brassards worn by Red Cross personnel fall under this category. Brassards are often used in this manner by military police, the brassard being both a badge of authority and identification.

Brassard (also "brassart" or "brasset") also refers to pieces of armour worn to cover the entire arm (encompassing vambrace, rerebrace, and possibly a couter).

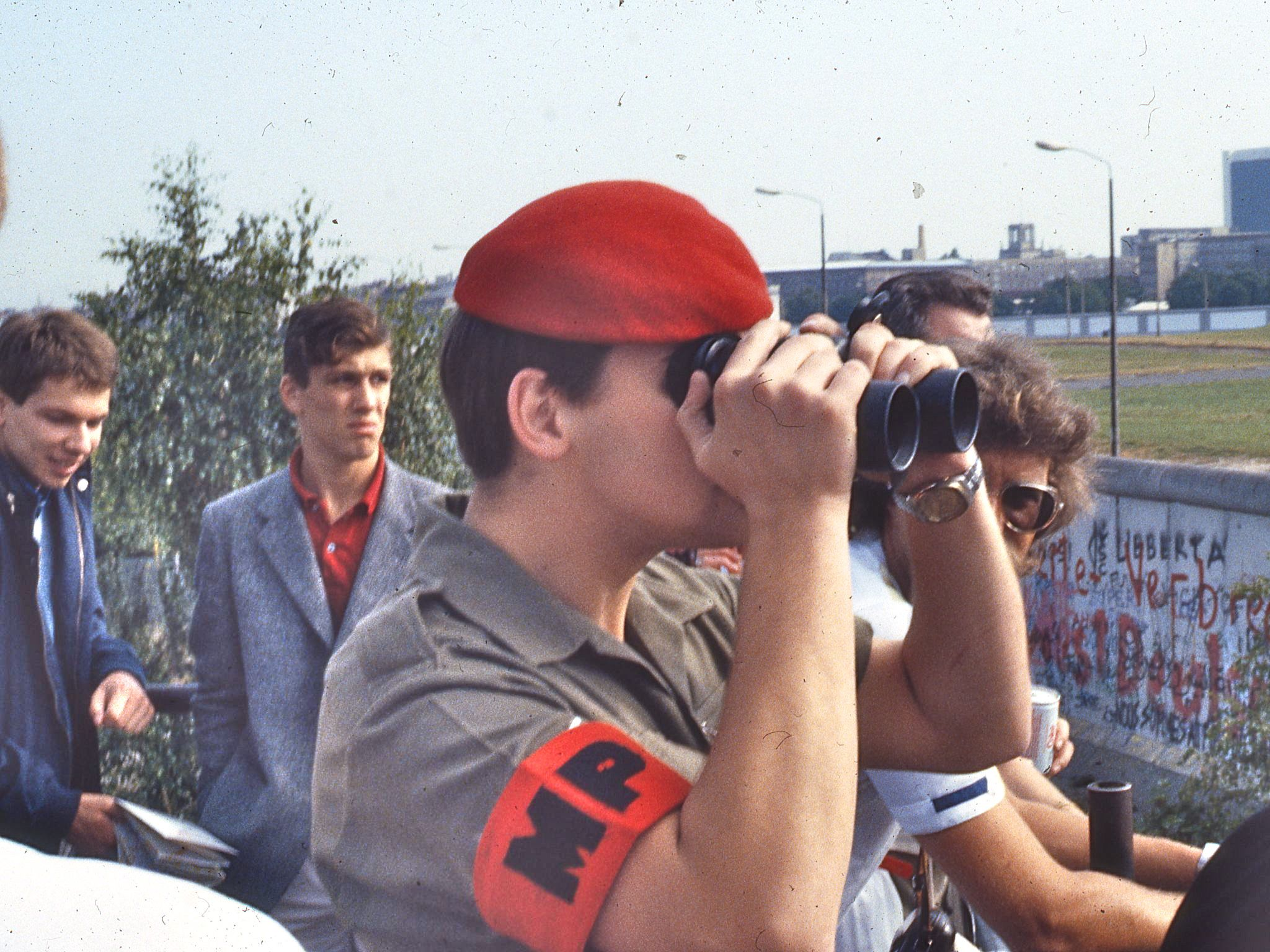
Armlet-wearing soldier of the British Royal Military Police in 1984.

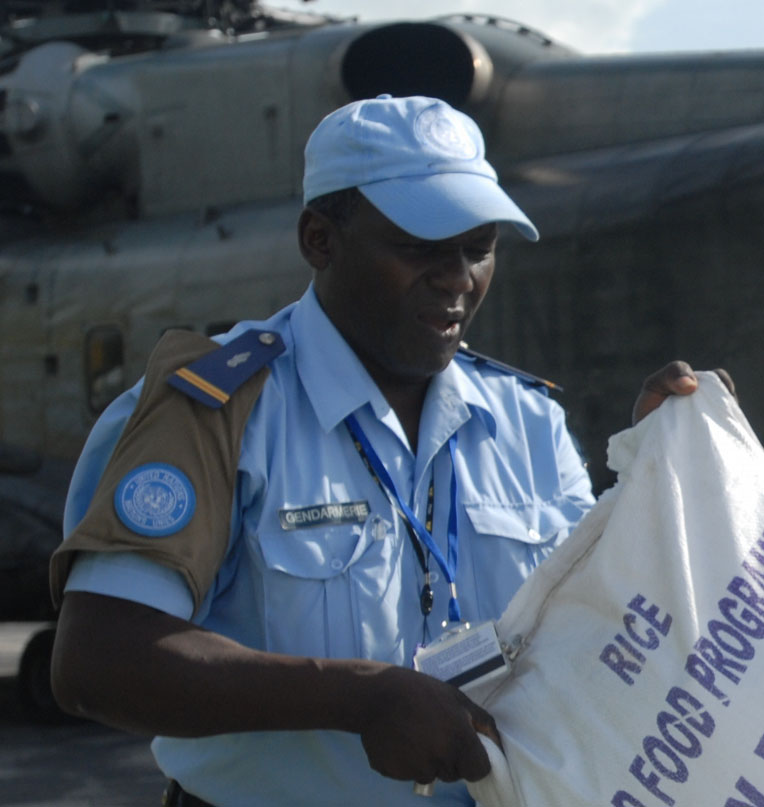
A Haitian policeman with a United Nations brassard, 2008.

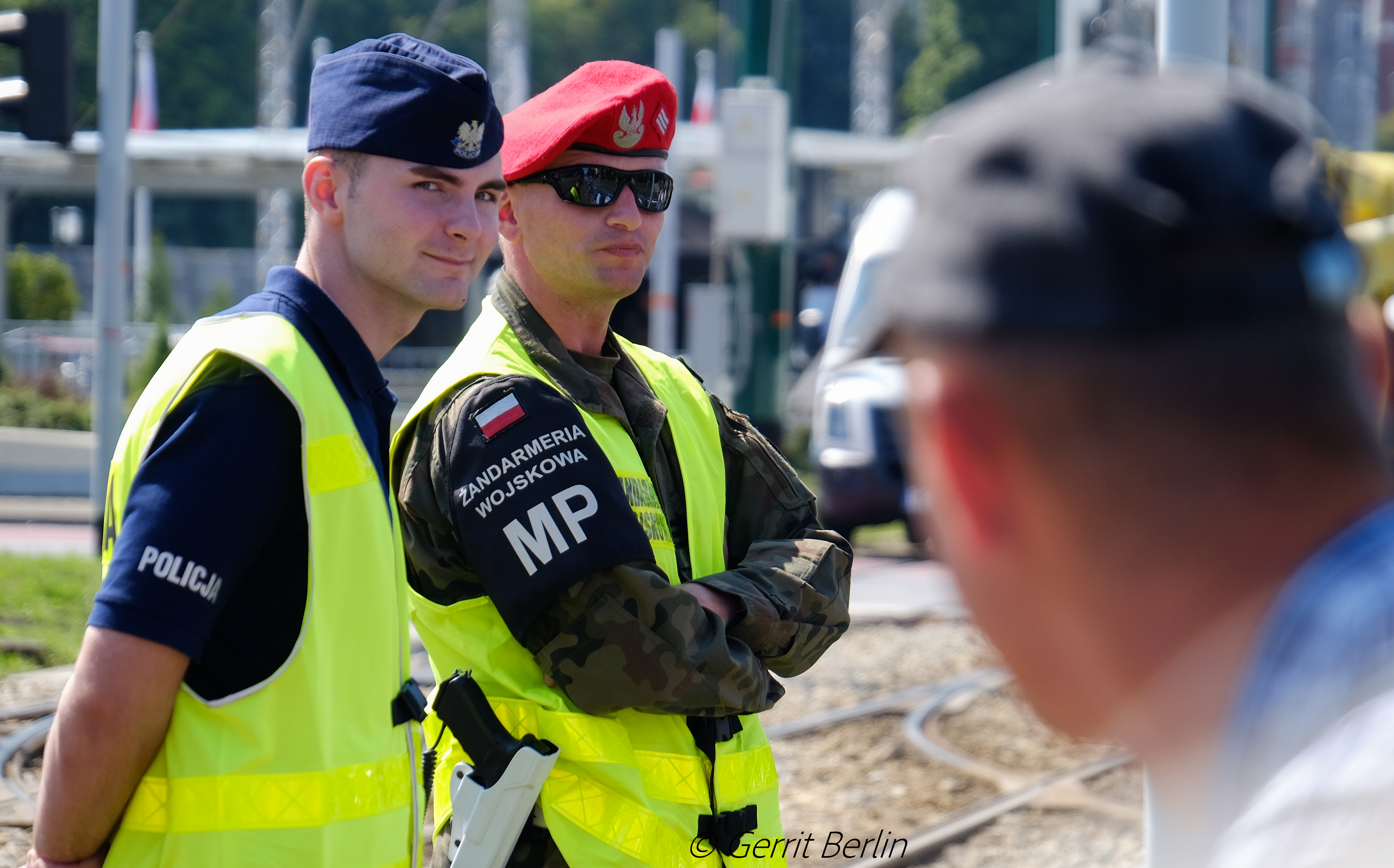
Soldier of the Polish Military Gendarmerie (right) displaying brassard, 2019.

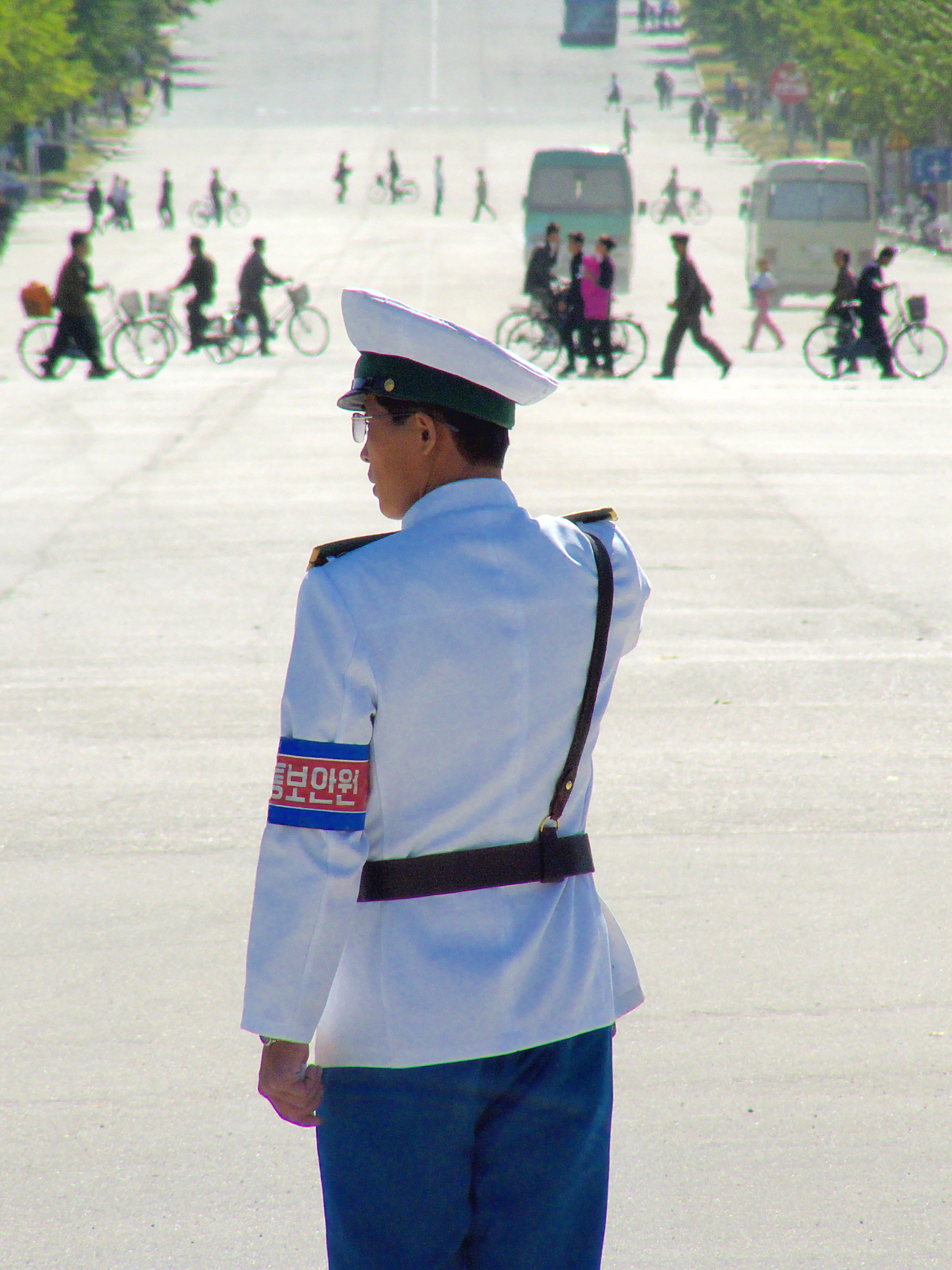
North Korean traffic controller wearing armlet, 2008.

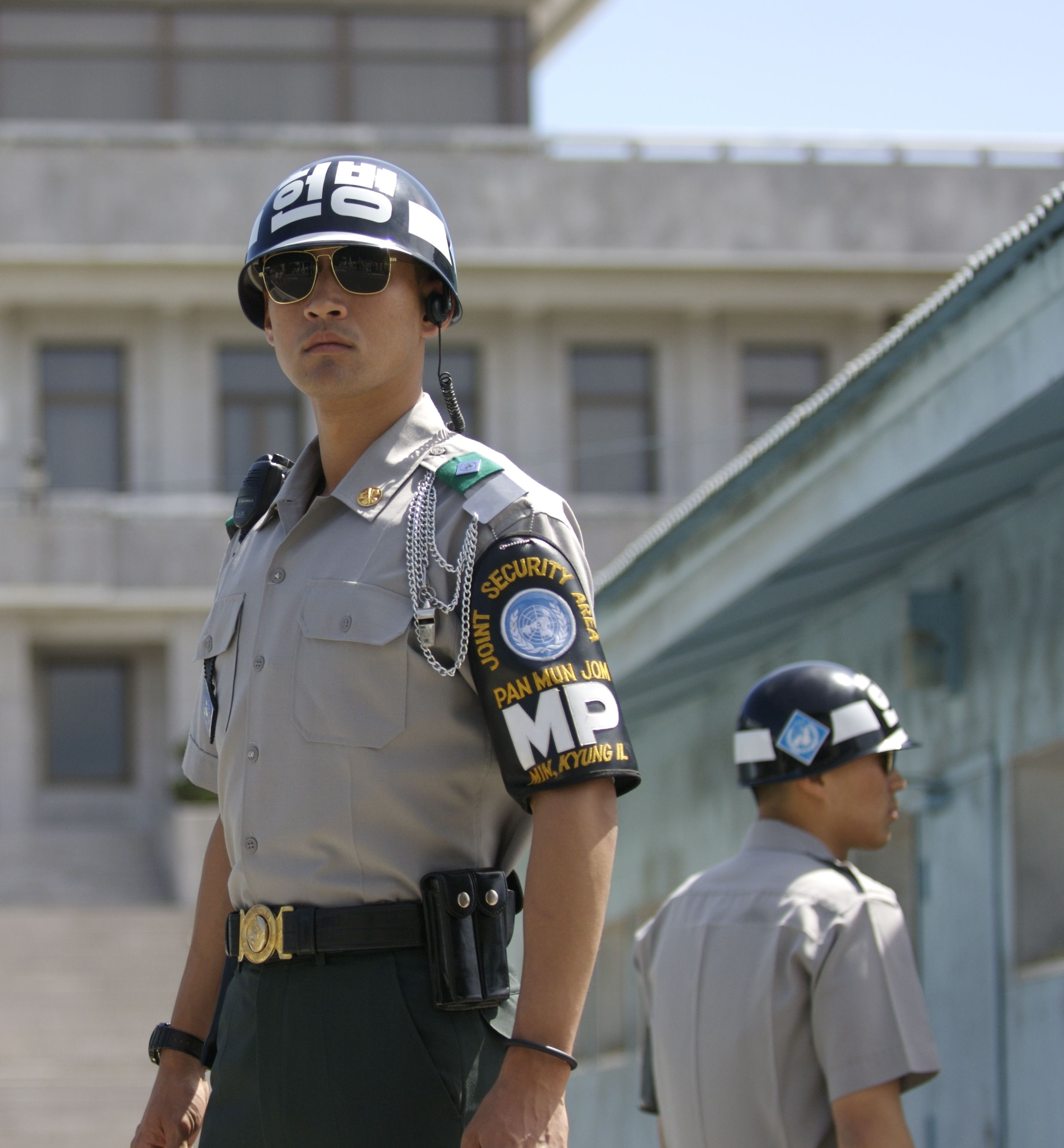
Soldier of the South Korean Military Police wearing brassard, 2007.

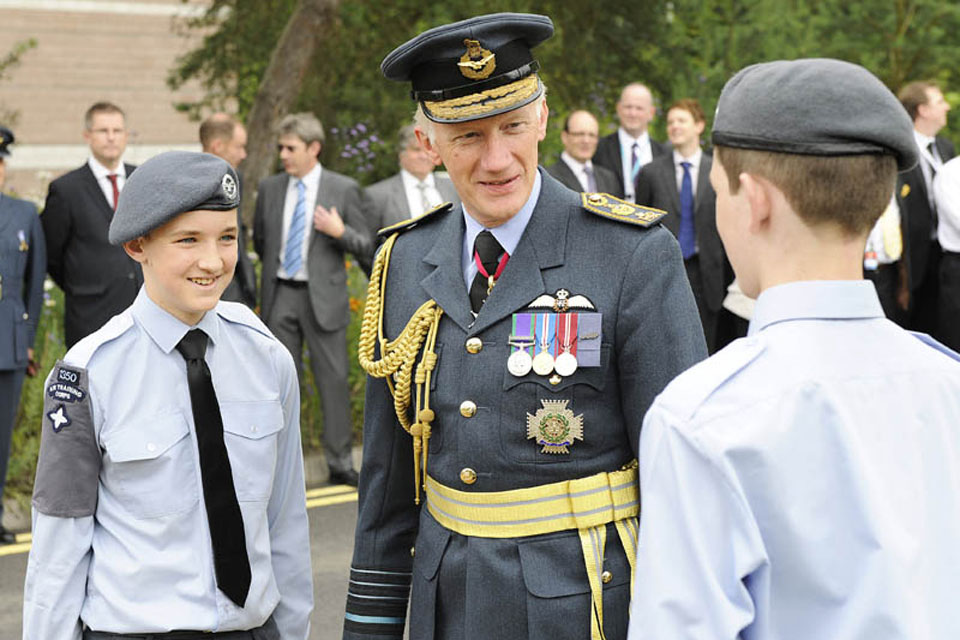
Cadets of the British Armed Forces wear a brassard on the right arm to display unit identity and merit badges.

== See also ==
- Armband
- Arm ring
- Black armband
