= Lyuba Vinogradova =

Russian historian (born 1973)

Lyubov Vinogradova (born 1973) is a Russian historian, researcher, translator and journalist.

== Biography ==
She was born in Moscow and graduated from the Moscow Agricultural Academy, where she also obtained a PhD in microbiology, followed by a second degree in English and German.

In 1994, while still preparing her doctorate, she became a research assistant for Antony Beevor in Volgograd, helping him gain access to Soviet archival material and conducting research (including oral history interviews) for his magnum opus Stalingrad (1998). In 2005, she co-edited a volume of Vasily Grossman's writings with Beevor. Their collaboration continued as late as 2026.

She has also worked for historians Simon Sebag Montefiore and Max Hastings, helping them with Russian sources, and acted as an editor for Jonathan Dimbleby, to whom she supplied material on the Ukrainian famine of 1932–1933.

Her own 2015 and 2017 English-language history books on Red Army's female soldiers have been translated into Spanish and Polish.

She emigrated to the United Kingdom due to her family connection to Boris Nemtsov, the former leader of the Union of Right Forces assassinated in 2015. She lives in Cardiff.

== Works ==
- Defending the Motherland: The Soviet Women who Fought Hitler's Aces, London: MacLehose Press, 2015, ISBN 9780857051929 (Spanish and Polish translations 2016)
- Avenging Angels: Soviet Women Snipers on the Eastern Front (1941–1945), London: MacLehose Press, 2017, ISBN 9780857051967 (Spanish translation 2017, Polish translation 2018)
