= Southwick House =

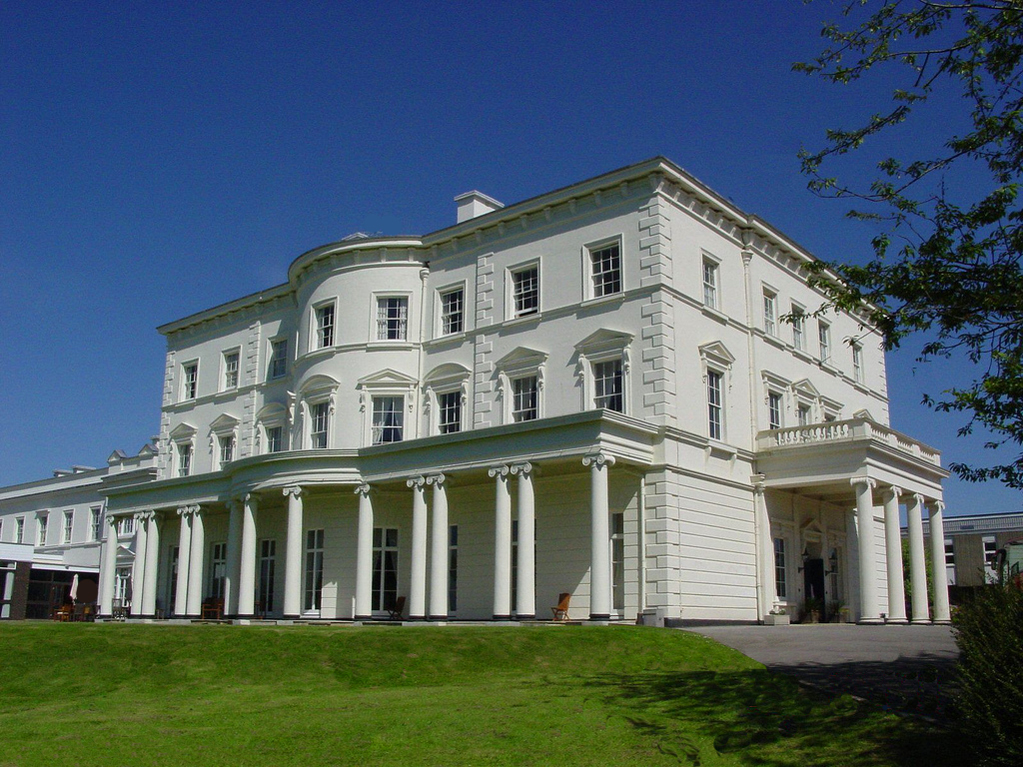
- Southwick House showing the colonnade

- Location within Hampshire

General information
- Architectural style: Georgian style
- Location: Hampshire, England
- Coordinates: 50°52′29″N 1°06′07″W
- Completed: 1800

Technical details
- Floor count: 3

Listed Building – Grade II
- Official name: HMS Dryad (Southwick House)
- Designated: 24 September 1987
- Reference no.: 1096247

Southwick House is a Grade II listed 19th-century manor house of the Southwick Estate in Hampshire, England, about 5 miles (8 km) north of Portsmouth. It is home to the Defence School of Policing and Guarding and related military police capabilities.

== History ==
=== Early history ===
The house was built in 1800 in the late Georgian style to replace Southwick Park house. The three-storey house is distinct for its two-storey foyer lit from a cupola and a series of elliptical rooms. A semi-circular portico is centred on the house's colonnade of paired Ionic columns.

=== World War II ===
The house became important during World War II. In 1940 the estate owners allowed the Royal Navy to use the house to accommodate overnight pupils of the Royal Navy School of Navigation, HMS Dryad, which was based in Portsmouth Naval Dockyard. In 1941, after heavy bombing of the dockyard, the house was requisitioned and became the new home of HMS Dryad.

In 1943, with the planning for D-Day already underway, the house was chosen to be the location of the advance or forward command post (Sharpener Camp) of the Supreme Headquarters Allied Expeditionary Force. Because of this, HMS Dryad was moved out of the house onto further land requisitioned from the estate.

=== D-day preparation ===
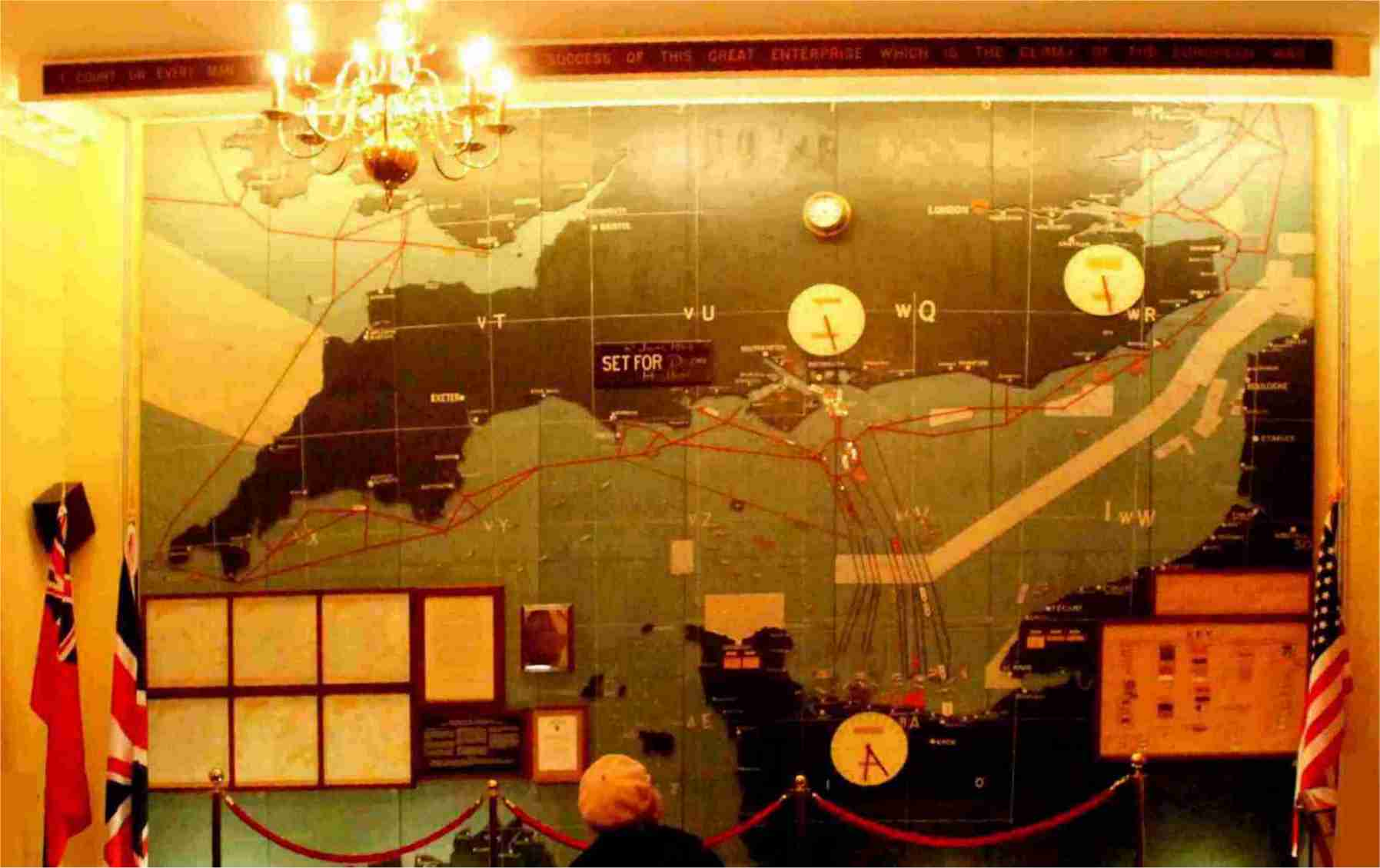
D-Day map in map room, 2019, with markers for positions of forces at the 6 June 1944 landings

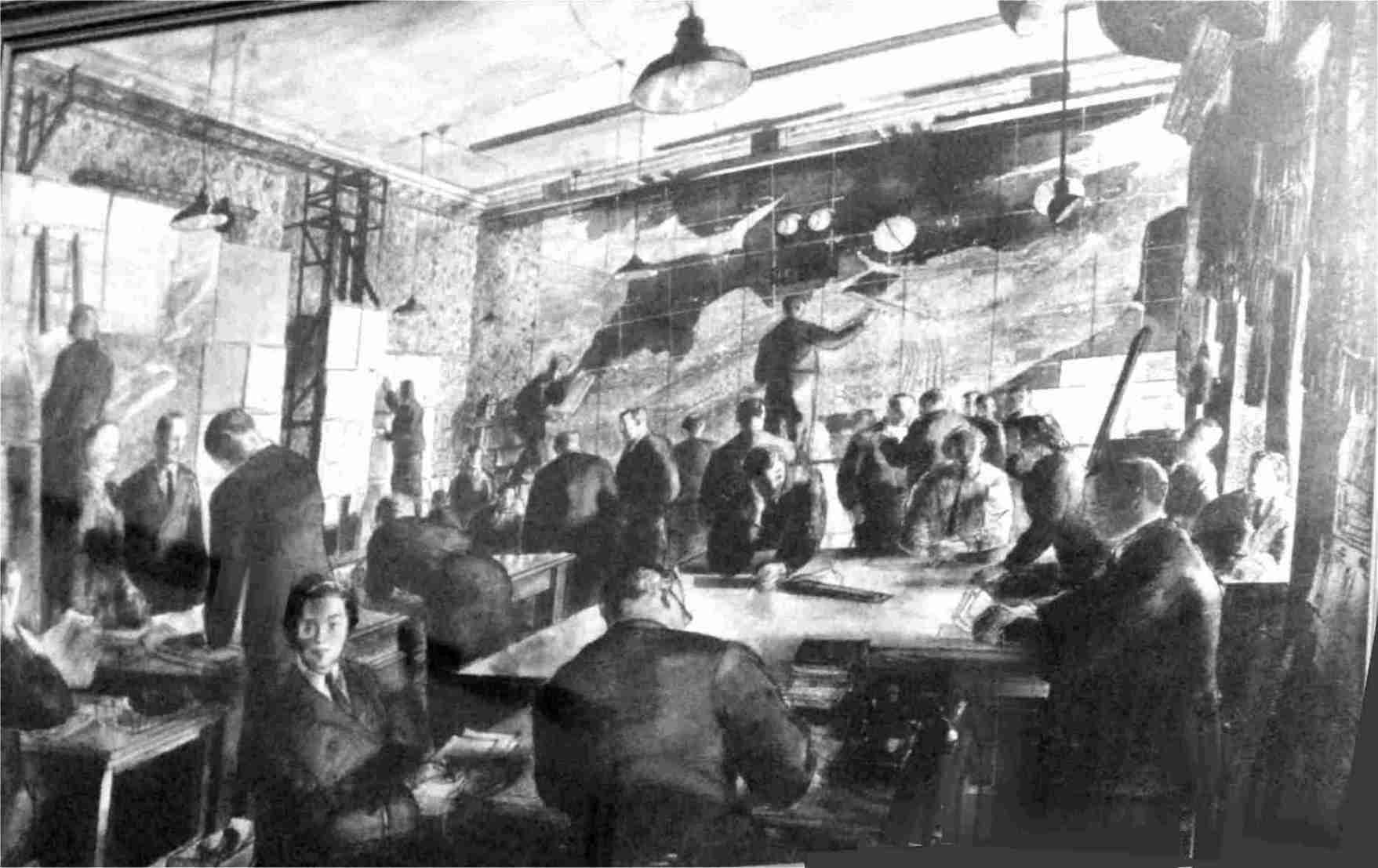
Drawing showing map room in operation, 1944

In 1944, in the months leading up to D-Day, the house became the headquarters of the main allied commanders, including Allied Supreme Commander General Eisenhower, Naval Commander-in-Chief Admiral Ramsay and Army Commander-in-Chief General Montgomery.

The large wall maps that were used on D-Day are still in place in the house in the main map room.

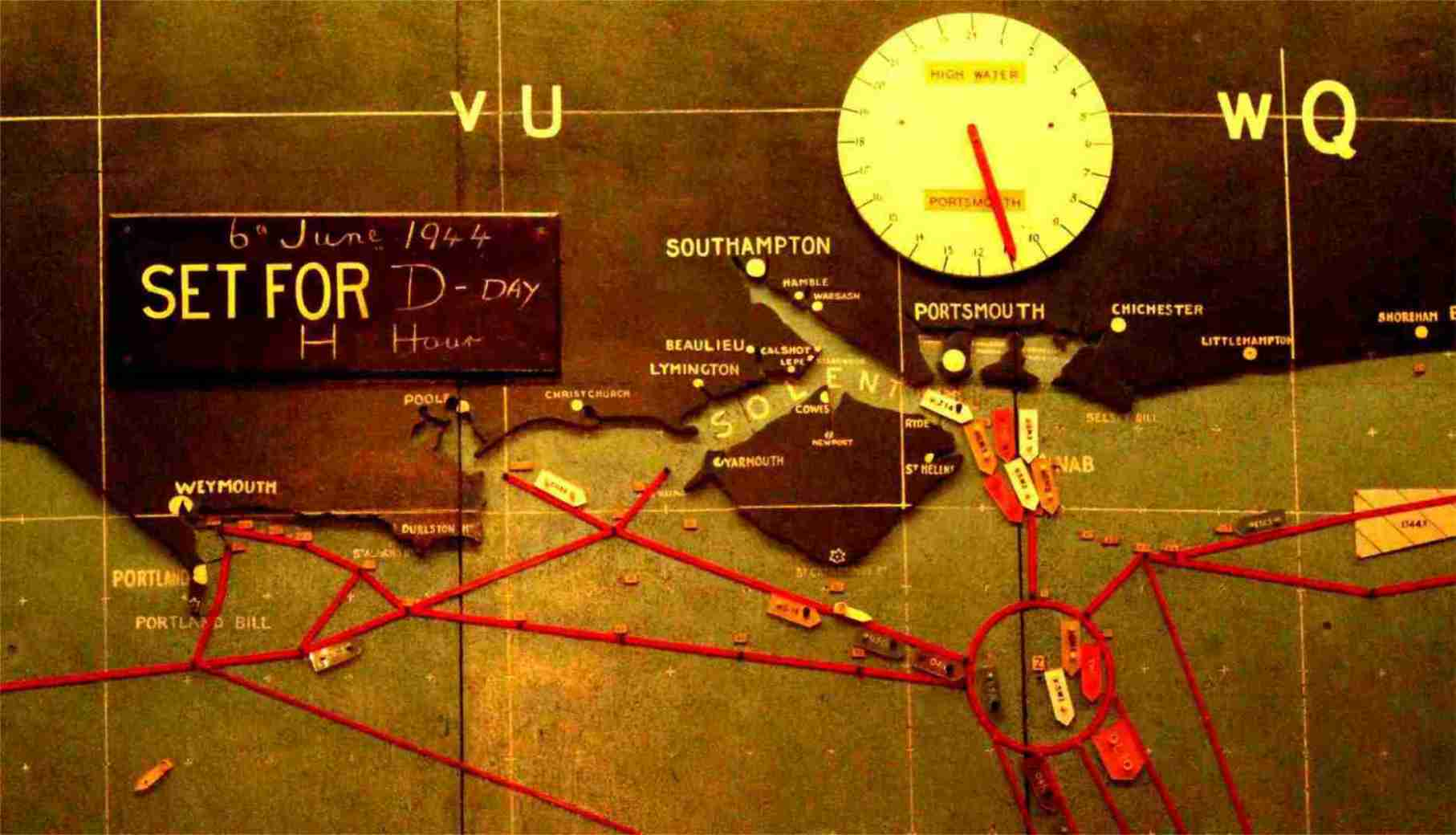
Area of the map showing D-day departure routes from the south coast of England; Isle of Wight in centre

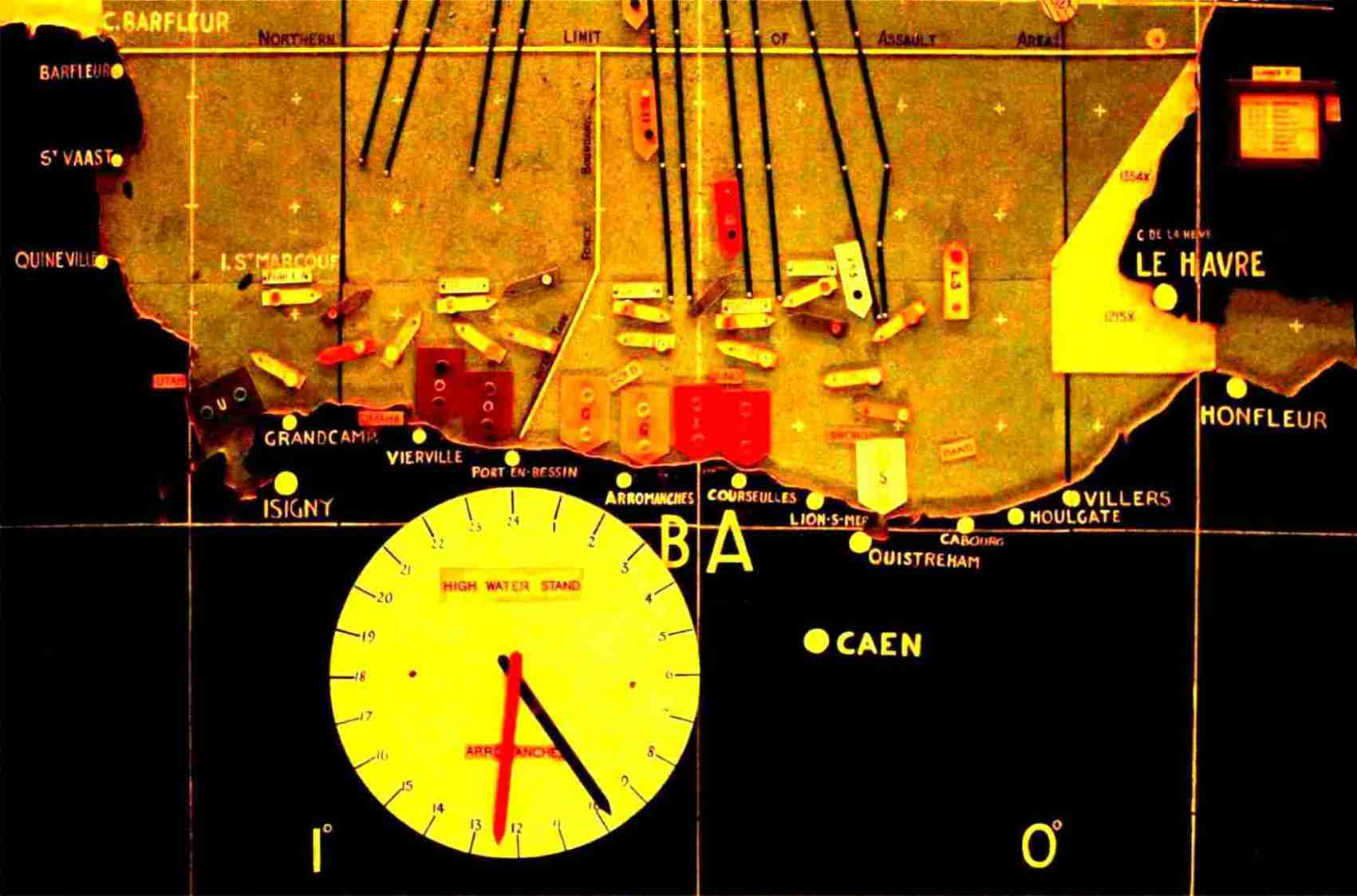
Area of the map showing arrival routes at the Normandy beaches around Arromanches

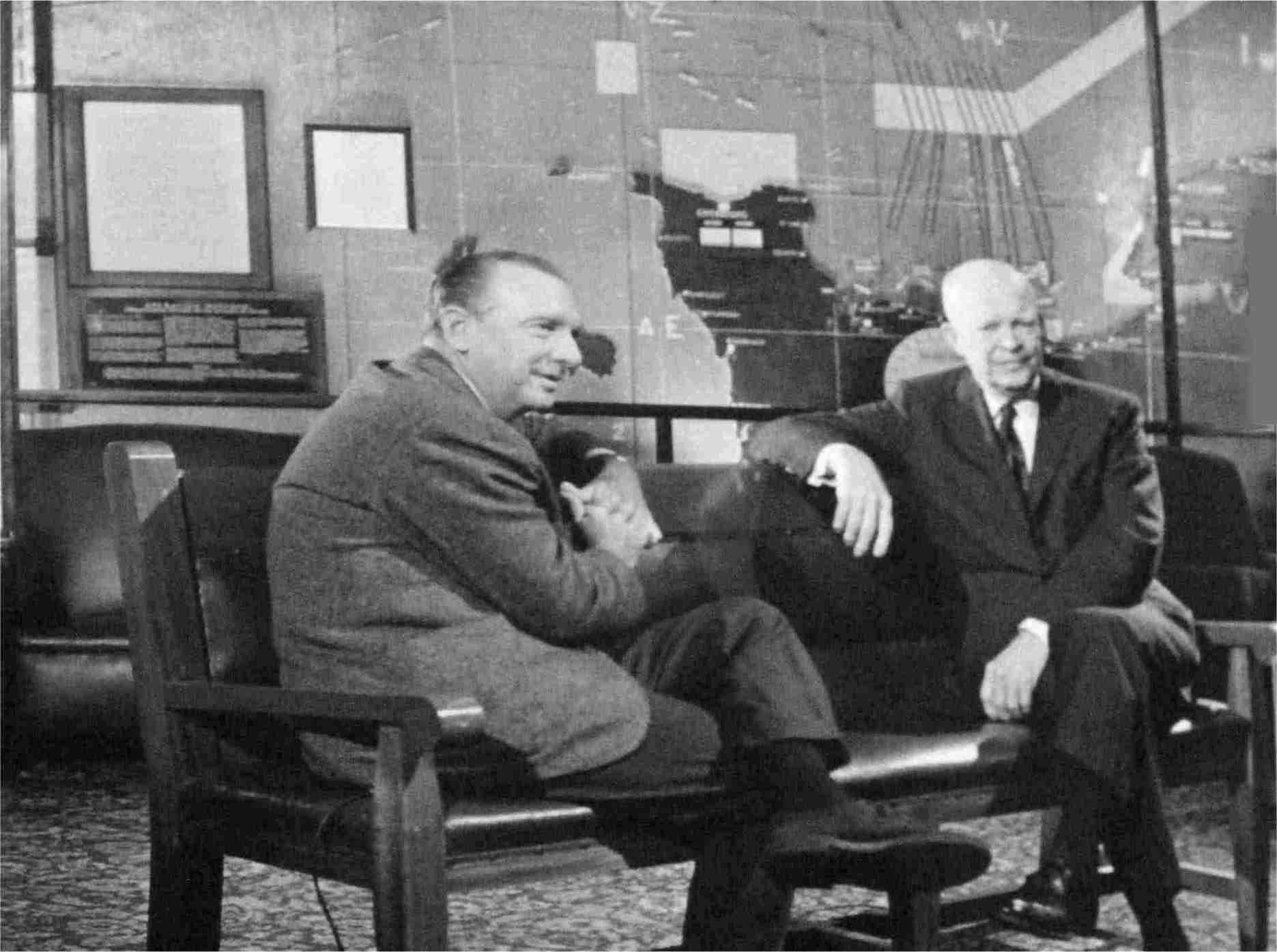
Former US president Eisenhower (right) revisited the map room in 1963 and was interviewed by Walter Cronkite

=== After HMS Dryad ===
In 2004, the functions of HMS Dryad were transferred to HMS Collingwood in Fareham and the site reverted to its original name of Southwick Park.

Since 2005, it has been home to the tri-Service Defence School of Policing and Guarding (formerly the Defence College of Policing and Guarding).

== Listings ==
In 1987, the house was recorded as Grade II listed on the National Heritage List for England. The following year the detached clock tower – a three-stage Italianate structure with a slate roof – was also Grade II listed.

== Bibliography ==
- Beevor, Antony; D-Day: The Battle for Normandy, Viking Publications, ISBN 978-0-670-88703-3
