= Berlin: The Downfall 1945 =

Narrative history book by Antony Beevor

- Author: Antony Beevor
- Language: English
- Subject: Battle of Berlin
- Publisher: Viking Press, Penguin Books
- Publication date: 2002
- Publication place: United Kingdom
- Pages: 501
- ISBN: 978-0-14-103239-9
- OCLC: 156890868

Berlin: The Downfall 1945 (published as The Fall of Berlin 1945 in the United States) is a narrative history book by Antony Beevor of the Battle of Berlin during the Second World War. It was published by Viking Press in 2002, then later by Penguin Books in 2003. It was critically and commercially successful. It has been a number-one best seller in seven countries and in the top five in another nine countries. Together it and Beevor's Stalingrad, first published in 1998, have sold nearly three million copies.

== Contents ==
The book revisits the events of the Battle of Berlin in 1945 and narrates how the Red Army defeated the Wehrmacht and brought an end to Nazi Germany, and to the war in Europe. The book was accompanied by a Timewatch programme by the BBC on Beevor's research into the subject.

== Prizes ==
Beevor received the first Trustees' Award of the Longman-History Today Awards in 2003.

== Publication notes ==
The book was published in the United States under the title The Fall of Berlin 1945, and has been translated into 24 languages. The British paperback version was published by Penguin Books in 2003.

== Reception ==
The Herald, after summarising the book's warm critical reception in other publications, called it "a gripping narrative which brings vividly to life the confusion, cruelty, courage and madness of the time, illustrated by eye-witness accounts and vignettes from diaries".

The historian Jonathan House, writing for The Journal of Military History, praised The Fall of Berlin, 1945 as "a fascinating, richly detailed account" and concluded that it was a "well-researched and superbly written study". He noted that the depiction of Soviet sexual violence was out of "not prurient curiosity, but rather an attempt to understand the nature of this horror for both the rapists and their victims". Writing for Economy and Society, Kirsten Campbell described the book as a "magisterial narrative" and praised Beevor's account as "vivid and compelling", adding that its "evocative prose is one of the strengths of the book".

Siegfried Schwarz, writing for H-Soz-Kult gave it a more mixed assessment. Schwarz praised Beevor's illustrations of the cruelty and inhumanity of the final phase of the war. However, he criticised its structure as it attempted to cover too many events in a single narrative, including details he considered trivial or unnecessary. He also felt that it gave too much prominence to Soviet sexual assaults in relation to the overall history of the war, while acknowledging that they did occur.

=== Controversy in Russia ===
The book proved hugely controversial in Russia because it contained information on atrocities committed by the Red Army against German civilians. In particular, among other Soviet war crimes, the book describes widespread rape of German women and female Soviet forced labourers, both before and after the war. The Russian ambassador to the UK denounced the book as "lies", "slander against the people who saved the world from Nazism" and an "act of blasphemy". Kremlin-supporting media described Beevor as "the chief slanderer of the Red Army". Numerous Russian academic theses and books have been published that dispute his claim as exaggerations, misattributions, or direct citations of propaganda used by Joseph Goebbels, including The Red Army “Rape of Germany” was Invented by Goebbels by the Russian author Anatoly Karlin. A local education ministry in Russia claimed that his books were published by George Soros's Open Society Foundations. Another government spokesperson in Yekaterinburg said that his books were "imbued with the propagandistic stereotypes of Nazism."

Oleg Rzheshevsky, a professor and the president of the Russian Association of World War II Historians, has claimed that Beevor is merely resurrecting the discredited and racist views of neo-Nazi historians, who depicted Soviet troops as subhuman "Asiatic hordes". Rzheshevsky said the Germans could have expected an "avalanche of revenge" after what they did in the Soviet Union, but "that did not happen".

Beevor responded by stating that he used excerpts from the report of General Tsigankov, the chief of the political department of the 1st Ukrainian Front, as a source. Beevor wrote that "the bulk of the evidence on the subject came from Soviet sources, especially the NKVD reports in GARF (State Archive of the Russian Federation), and a wide range of reliable personal accounts". Beevor also stated that he hoped Russian historians would "take a more objective approach to material in their own archives which are at odds to the heroic myth of the Red Army as 'liberators' in 1945".

In August 2015 the Yekaterinburg region considered a ban on John Keegan and Beevor's books, accusing Beevor of Nazi sympathies and citing his lack of Russian sources when writing about Russia, and claiming he had promoted false stereotypes introduced by Nazi Germany during the war. Beevor responded by calling the banning "a government trying to impose its own version of history", comparing it to other "attempts to dictate a truth", such as denial of the Holocaust and the Armenian genocide. The Russian historian Aleksandr Dyukov was critical of the ban. Though he accused Beevor of being "anti-Soviet", he also said "there is no glorifying of Nazism in his books. I think banning history books is a bad idea."

The British historian Richard Overy, from the University of Exeter, has criticised Russian reactions to the book and defended Beevor. Overy accused the Russians of refusing to acknowledge Soviet war crimes, and said this was "[partly] because they felt that much of it was justified vengeance against an enemy who committed much worse, and partly it was because they were writing the victors' history".
