= Antony Beevor =

English military historian (born 1946)

Sir Antony Beevor FRSL FRHistS
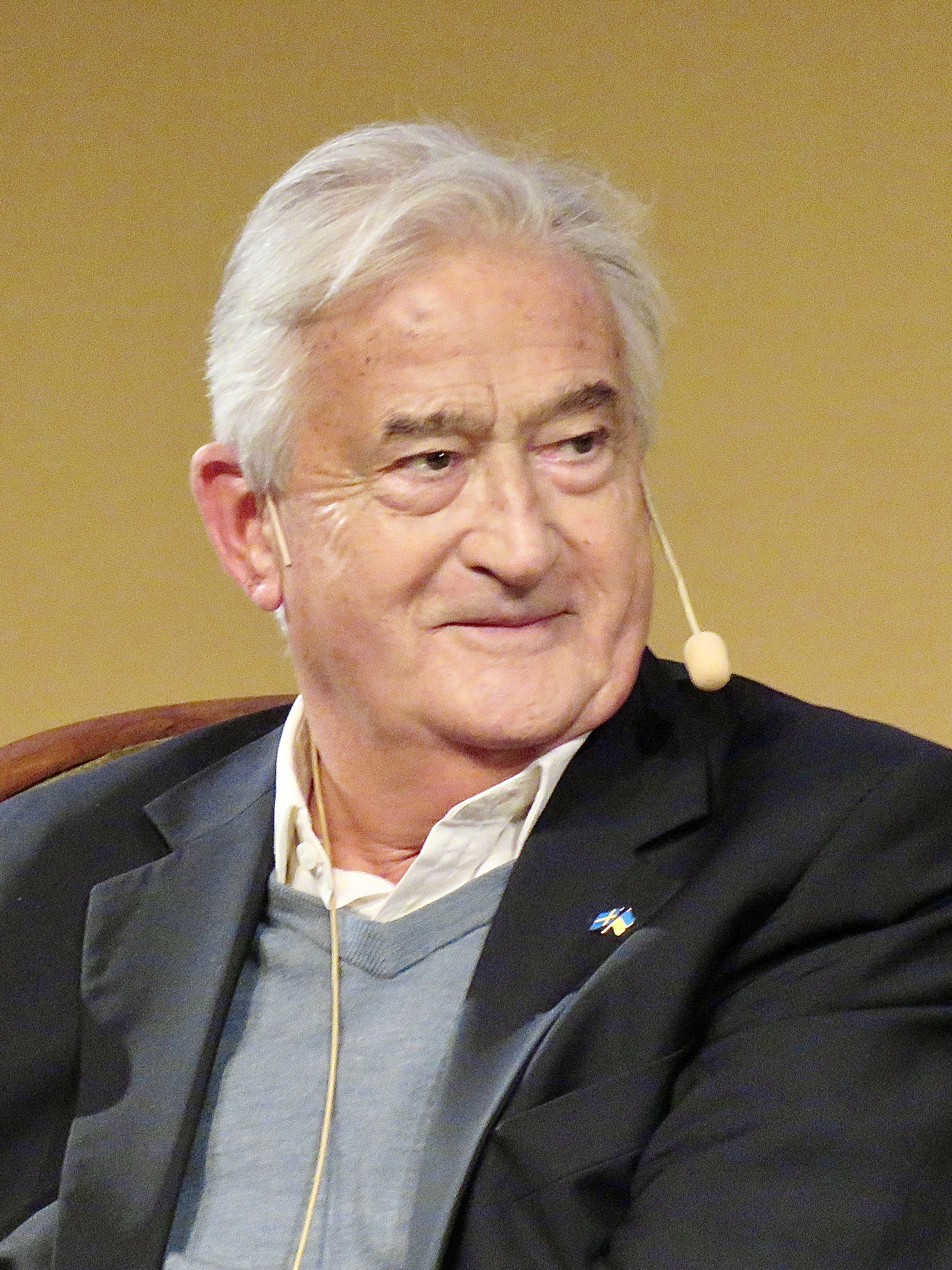
- Beevor in 2022
- Born: Antony James Beevor; 14 December 1946 (age 79); Kensington, London, England
- Education: Abberley Hall School; Winchester College; Royal Military Academy Sandhurst
- Occupations: Author, historian
- Spouse: Artemis Cooper (m. 1986)
- Children: 2
- Relatives: John Julius Norwich (father-in-law)
- Writing career
- Language: English
- Subject: Modern history
- Notable awards: Samuel Johnson Prize
- Military career
- Allegiance: United Kingdom
- Branch: British Army
- Service years: 1966–1970
- Rank: Lieutenant
- Service number: 483855
- Unit: 11th Hussars
- Website: www.antonybeevor.com

Sir Antony James Beevor (born 14 December 1946) is a British military historian and author. He has published several popular historical works, mainly on the Second World War, the Spanish Civil War, and most recently the Russian Revolution and the Russian Civil War.

Educated at Abberley Hall School, Winchester College, and the Royal Military Academy Sandhurst, Beevor commanded a troop of tanks in the 11th Hussars in Germany before deciding in 1970 to leave the British Army and become a writer. He became a visiting professor at Birkbeck, University of London, and the University of Kent.

His best-selling books, Stalingrad (1998) and Berlin: The Downfall 1945 (2002), have been acclaimed for their detailed coverage of the battles between the Soviet Union and Germany, and their focus on the experiences of ordinary people. Berlin proved very controversial in Russia because of the information it contained from former Soviet archives about the mass rapes carried out by the Red Army in 1945. Beevor's works have been translated into many languages and have sold millions of copies. He has lectured at numerous military headquarters, staff colleges and establishments in Britain, the United States, Europe and Australia. He has also written for many major newspapers.

== Early life and career ==
Antony James Beevor was born in Kensington, London, on 14 December 1946. He was educated at two independent schools: Abberley Hall School in Worcestershire, and then Winchester College in Hampshire from 1960 to 1964. He attended the University of Grenoble from 1964 to 1965.

He joined the British Army as a cadet at the Royal Military Academy Sandhurst in 1965. As well as the usual cadet activities, he was able to study under the military historian John Keegan. On graduation he was commissioned in the 11th Hussars on 28 July 1967. Beevor served in England and Germany. He was promoted to lieutenant on 28 January 1969. He resigned his commission on 5 August 1970, having spent five years as a regular officer.

He was a freelance journalist in the Middle East in 1970, before moving to London to work in marketing and advertising from 1971 to 1972, and marketing and publishing from 1974 to 1975. After publishing his first novel, a political thriller, with John Murray in 1975, he dedicated himself to writing. According to his own account, he was persuaded to turn to military history by a publisher.

== Later career ==
Beevor has been a visiting professor at the School of History, Classics and Archaeology at Birkbeck, University of London, and at the University of Kent. He was the 2002–2003 Lees-Knowles Lecturer at the University of Cambridge. He has lectured at military colleges and staff headquarters in various countries from 1998 onwards.

He worked with Jacqueline Kennedy Onassis as his editor for his 1994 book Paris After the Liberation, 1944–1949, co-written with his wife. He began a long-term research partnership with the Russian historian Lyuba Vinogradova (then a biology PhD student) in Volgograd in 1994, while preparing his first, commissioned book on Soviet history; she initially extracted material from the archives for him.

His best-known works, the best-selling Stalingrad (1998) and Berlin: The Downfall 1945 (2002), recount the Second World War battles between the Soviet Union and Nazi Germany. They have been praised for their vivid, compelling style, their treatment of the ordinary lives of combatants and civilians, and the use of newly disclosed documents from Soviet archives.

Berlin proved hugely controversial in Russia because of the information it contained from former Soviet archives about, the mass rapes carried out by the Red Army in 1945, among other Soviet war crimes. He was criticised for "lies, slander and blasphemy" against the Red Army by the Russian ambassador at the time, Grigory Karasin, and was frequently described as "the chief slanderer of the Red Army" by Kremlin-supporting media. Numerous Russian academic theses and books have been published that dispute his claim as exaggerations, misattributions, or direct citations of propaganda used by Joseph Goebbels, including The Red Army “Rape of Germany” was Invented by Goebbels by the Russian author Anatoly Karlin.

His The Spanish Civil War (1982) was later re-written as The Battle for Spain (2006), keeping the structure and some content from the earlier work, but using the updated narrative style of his Stalingrad book and also adding characters and new archival research from German and Russian sources.

Beevor's book The Second World War (2012) is notable for its focus on the conditions and grief faced by women and civilians and for its coverage of the war in East Asia, which has been called "masterful". Beevor's expertise has been the subject of some commentary; his publications have been praised as revitalising interest in Second World War topics and have allowed readers to reevaluate events such as D-Day from a new perspective. He has also appeared as an expert in television documentaries related to World War II.

As of 2014 his works had been translated into 35 languages, with more than 8.5 million copies sold.

In August 2015 the Yekaterinburg region considered banning Beevor's books, accusing him of Nazi sympathies and citing his lack of Russian sources when writing about Russia, and claiming he had promoted false stereotypes introduced by Nazi Germany during the war. Beevor responded by calling the banning "a government trying to impose its own version of history", comparing it to other "attempts to dictate a truth", such as denial of the Holocaust and the Armenian genocide.

In January 2018 Beevor's book about the Battle of Stalingrad was banned in Ukraine for its description of war crimes committed by Ukrainian nationalists collaborating with Nazi forces (namely the execution of children). The official in charge of the decision, Serhiy Oliynyk, denied the event in question and called it a "provocation" likely emanating from Soviet historical sources. Beevor refuted the claims of an alleged anti-Ukrainian bent in the book, and pointed out that the source for the passage in question was an Abwehr officer named Helmuth Groscurth, demanding "an immediate apology from Oliynyk and a reversal of the decision by the 'expert council.'"

Beevor has been described as a "popular historian" and as a "respected military historian" whose work is "not strictly … academic". He has been credited with using his thriller writer's technique to achieve success as a historian, and has insisted himself that history is "a branch of literature" without scientific pretences. He has also written for The Times, The Telegraph and Guardian, the New York Times, Washington Post, The Atlantic, Foreign Affairs, Le Monde, Libération, Le Figaro, as well as El País and ABC in Spain.

== Other activities ==
Beevor was a committee member for the London Library, and served as an academic advisory group member of the European Council on Tolerance and Reconciliation from 2018 to 2021 (alongside Timothy Snyder, Bernard-Henri Lévy and Aleksandr Dynkin).

In November 2019, he was among the signatories of a letter refusing to endorse Jeremy Corbyn's Labour Party in the 2019 United Kingdom general election due to its "association with antisemitism".

A former chair and member of the Council of the Society of Authors, he resigned alongside the author Philip Pullman in 2022 in protest against the actions of the CEO and the leadership of the management committee.

== Personal life ==
Beevor's father John was a solicitor who served with the Special Operations Executive during the World War II, and his mother Kinta was initially selected by Ian Fleming at the Naval Intelligence Division for a spying operation in Fascist Italy in 1940.

Beevor is descended from a long line of writers, starting with the legal philosopher John Austin and his wife, Sarah, their daughter Lucie, Lady Duff-Gordon (Letters from Egypt), his grandmother Lina Waterfield, (Observer correspondent and Castle in Italy), and his mother Kinta Beevor (A Tuscan Childhood). According to himself, five generations of his mother's family had published with John Murray before him.

He is married to Artemis Cooper, a writer. They have two children, Nella and Adam.

== Honours and awards ==
Beevor was elected a Fellow of the Royal Society of Literature in 1999 and a Fellow of the Royal Historical Society in 2017.

He was recognised with the 2014 Pritzker Military Museum & Library's Literature Award for Lifetime Achievement in Military Writing. Tim O'Brien, the 2013 recipient, made the announcement on behalf of the selection committee. The award carried a purse of US$100,000.

Beevor was awarded Honorary D.Litt. degrees from the University of Kent in 2004, from the University of Bath in 2010, the University of East Anglia in 2014, and the University of York in 2015.

He was elected an honorary Fellow of King's College London in July 2016. Also in July 2016, Beevor was awarded the Medlicott Medal for services to history by the UK-based Historical Association.

Beevor was knighted in the 2017 New Year Honours for "services in support of Armed Forces Professional Development".

He is also a Chevalier de l'Ordre des Arts et des Lettres (1997), a Member of Estonia's Order of the Cross of Terra Mariana (2008) and a Commander of the Belgian Order of the Crown (2016).

Awards for his works include:

- Crete: The Battle and the Resistance
  - Runciman Prize, administered by the Anglo-Hellenic League for stimulating interest in Greek history and culture
- Stalingrad
  - The first Samuel Johnson Prize for Non-Fiction
  - Wolfson History Prize
  - Hawthornden Prize for Literature
- Berlin: The Downfall 1945
  - Longman-History Today Trustees' Award
- The Battle for Spain: The Spanish Civil War 1936–1939 (Spanish Edition)
  - La Vanguardia Prize for Non-Fiction

== Published works ==
=== Fiction ===
- Violent Brink. London: John Murray, 1975. ISBN 978-0-7195-3241-2
- For Reasons of State. London: Jonathan Cape, 1980. ISBN 978-0-224-01930-9
- The Faustian Pact. London: Jonathan Cape, 1983. ISBN 978-0-02-030461-6
- The Enchantment of Christina von Retzen. London: Weidenfeld & Nicolson, 1989. ISBN 978-0-297-79523-0

=== Nonfiction ===
- The Spanish Civil War. London: Orbis, 1982. ISBN 978-0-14-100148-7
- Inside the British Army. London: Chatto and Windus, 1990. ISBN 978-0-552-13818-5
- Crete 1941: The Battle and the Resistance. London: John Murray, 1991. ISBN 978-0-14-016787-0
- with Artemis Cooper. Paris After the Liberation, 1944–1949. London: Penguin, 1994.
- Stalingrad. London: Viking Press, 1998. ISBN 978-0-670-87095-0
- Berlin: The Downfall 1945. London: Penguin, 2002. ISBN 978-0-670-03041-5 (Published as The Fall of Berlin 1945 in the U.S.)
- The Mystery of Olga Chekhova. London: Penguin, 2004. ISBN 978-0-670-03340-9
- The Battle for Spain: The Spanish Civil War 1936–1939. London: Weidenfeld & Nicolson, 2006. ISBN 978-0-14-303765-1
- D-Day: The Battle for Normandy. London: Penguin, 2009. ISBN 978-0-670-02119-2
- The Second World War. London: Weidenfeld & Nicolson, 2012. ISBN 978-0-316-02374-0
- Ardennes 1944: Hitler's Last Gamble. Viking, 2015. ISBN 978-0-670-91864-5
- Arnhem: The Battle for the Bridges, 1944. Viking, 2018. ISBN 978-0-241-32676-3
- Russia: Revolution and Civil War, 1917—1921. London: Weidenfeld & Nicolson, 2022. ISBN 978-1-474-61014-8
- Rasputin: And the Downfall of the Romanovs. London: Weidenfeld & Nicolson, 2026. ISBN 979-8-217-06118-1

=== Edited volumes ===
- A Writer at War: Vasily Grossman with the Red Army 1941–1945 by Vasily Grossman. ISBN 978-0-375-42407-6

=== Book contributions ===
- The British Army, Manpower and Society into the Twenty-First Century, ed by Hew Strachan ISBN 978-0-7146-8069-9
- What Ifs? of American History: Eminent Historians Imagine What Might Have Been, by Robert Cowley (Editor), Antony Beevor and Caleb Carr. (2003) ISBN 978-0-425-19818-6
