= HMS Dryad (shore establishment) =

Stone frigate

Coordinates: 50°52′29″N 1°6′6″W

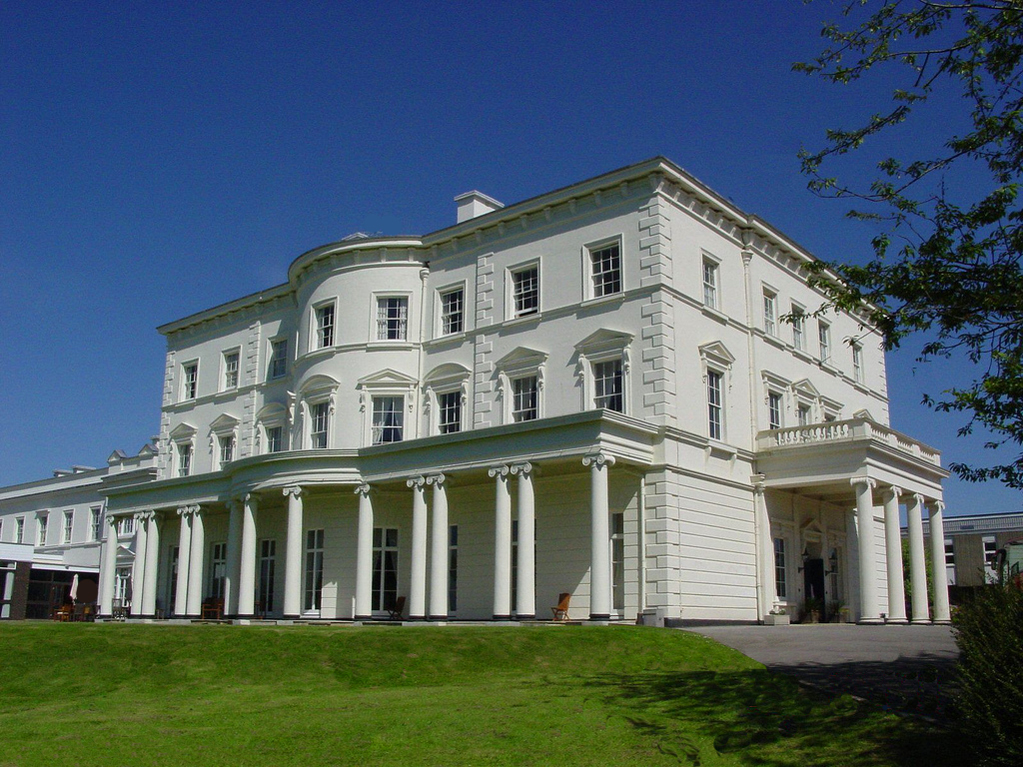
Southwick House, the former wardroom of HMS Dryad

HMS Dryad is a former stone frigate (shore establishment) near Portsmouth. It was the home of the Royal Navy's Maritime Warfare School from the Second World War until it moved to HMS Collingwood at Fareham in 2004. The site was handed over to the Ministry of Defence in 2005 and is now occupied by the Defence School of Policing and Guarding.

== See also ==
- Southwick House
