= HMS Collingwood (shore establishment) =

Training establishment of the Royal Navy

Coordinates: 50°50′07″N 1°11′30″W

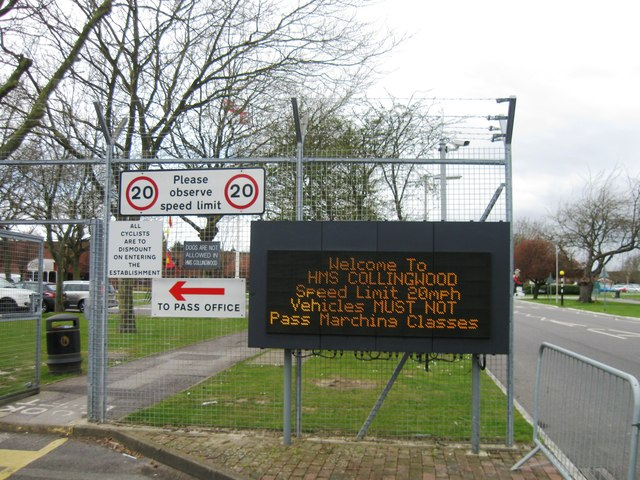
- Entrance to HMS Collingwood
- Active: 1940 – present
- Country: United Kingdom
- Branch: Royal Navy
- Type: Training
- Role: Naval training
- Part of: Flag Officer Sea Training
- Motto(s): Ferar unus et idem (Latin: "I shall carry on regardless")

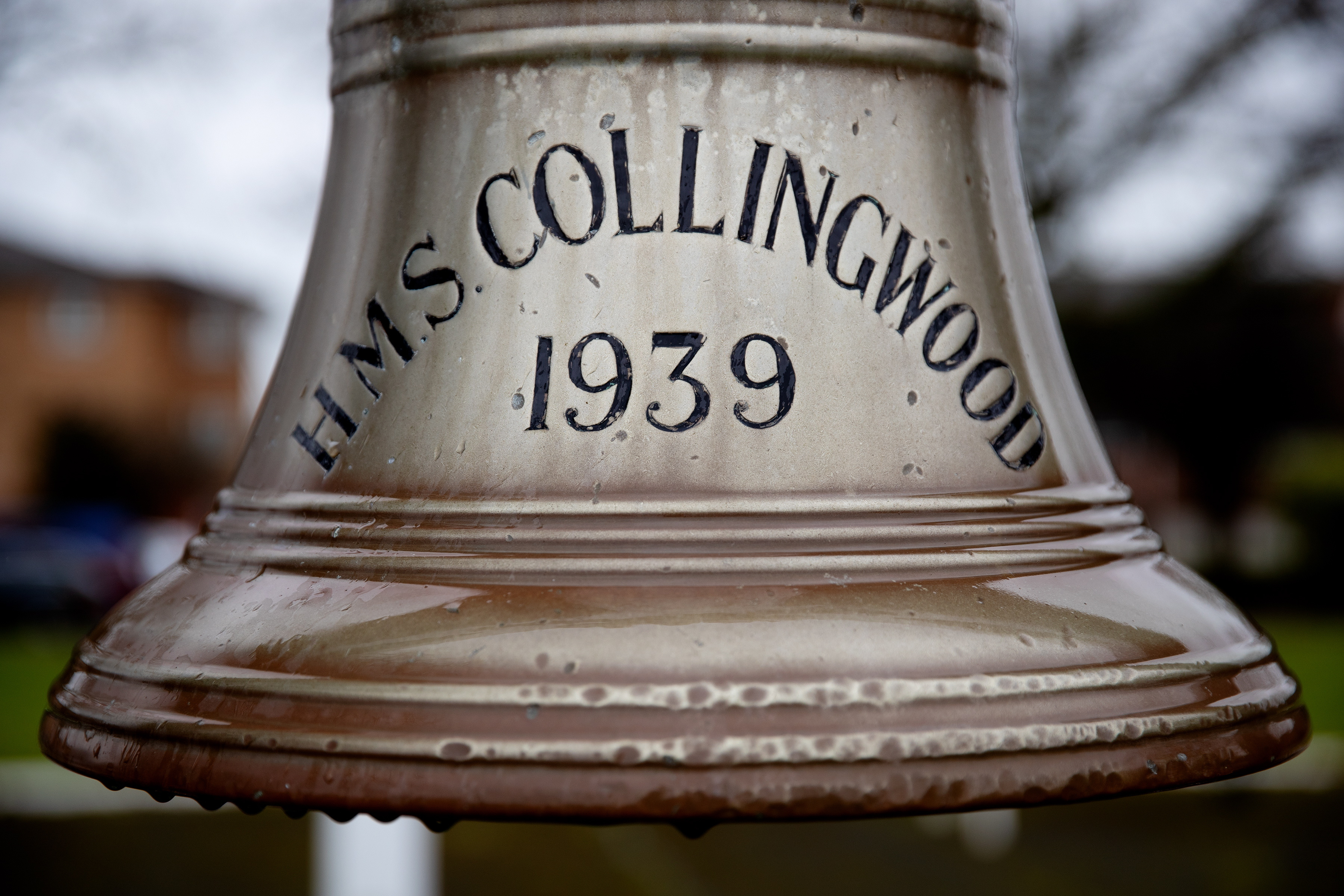
Ship's bell

HMS Collingwood is a stone frigate (shore establishment) of the Royal Navy, in Fareham, England. It is the lead establishment of the Maritime Warfare School and the largest naval training organisation in Western Europe. The Maritime Warfare School is a federated training establishment incorporating HMS Excellent, the Defence Diving School, the RN Physical Training School and the School of Hydrography and Meteorology in Plymouth.

== History ==
HMS Collingwood gained its name from Lord Collingwood, a distinguished admiral at the turn of the 19th century. The current shore establishment was commissioned as the fourth HMS Collingwood on 10 January 1940, initially to instruct "hostilities only" ratings of the seaman branch. Wireless telegraphy ratings started their training in June 1940, and a radio direction finding school was added in 1942. In 1946 Collingwood took over the training of both officers and ratings in the maintenance of all electrical and radio equipment in the fleet, except that of the Fleet Air Arm.

The Maritime Warfare School was formed in January 2002 as part of the British Government's Defence Training Review with, in particular, the transfer in of training previously undertaken at HMS Dryad.

In spring 2007, the Maritime Warfare Centre relocated to HMS Collingwood from HMS Dryad (now the tri-service establishment Southwick Park) and Portsdown Technology Park.

Battle honours for the name are Jutland 1916 (earned by HMS Collingwood, a St Vincent-class dreadnought battleship) and Atlantic 1941–1944 (earned by HMCS Collingwood, a Flower-class corvette). The motto is Ferar unus et idem (Latin: "I shall carry on regardless").

In November 2020 the Royal Navy announced that, in January 2021, HMS Collingwood would take its first intake of ratings recruits for their initial training package, a role normally completed by HMS Raleigh, and that there would be places for 500 recruits. Collingwood, along with Britannia Royal Naval College, undertook this role due to HMS Raleigh training at maximum capacity following a surge in recruitment.

== Cadets ==
The establishment is also home to the Royal Naval Cadets of HMS Collingwood Royal Naval Volunteer Cadet Corps. The VCC is open to young people aged 9 to 16 who can serve until their 18th birthday as well as adult volunteers from the age of 18 to 65.
