= The Battle for Spain =

2006 book by Antony Beevor

- Author: Antony Beevor
- Subject: Spanish history
- Publisher: Weidenfeld & Nicolson
- Publication date: 2006
- Pages: 526
- ISBN: 978-0143037651

The Battle for Spain: The Spanish Civil War 1936–1939 is a 2006 history of the Spanish Civil War written by Antony Beevor and published by Weidenfeld & Nicolson. It is a revised edition of Beevor's 1982 The Spanish Civil War.

== Reception ==
Discussing the main theses contained in the book, Spanish historian Julián Casanova noted that Beevor is in the minority of historians who deny that the international situation was decisive for the outcome of the war. He cited Beevor's view that the Italian Fascist and Nazi German interventions only sped up the Nationalist victory, without determining it. Casanova also observed the agreement between Beevor's portrayal of the result as a military failure of the Spanish Republican Armed Forces and their Soviet advisers on the one hand, and the late Francoist historiography (e.g. Ramón Salas Larrazábal) on the other.
