= Stalingrad (Beevor book) =

1998 book by Antony Beevor

- Author: Antony Beevor
- Language: English
- Subject: Military history
- Publisher: Viking Press, Penguin Books
- Publication date: 6 May 1999
- Publication place: United Kingdom
- Pages: 494
- ISBN: 0-14-024985-0 (Paperback)
- OCLC: 40646157

Stalingrad is a narrative history written by Antony Beevor of the battle fought in and around the city of Stalingrad during World War II, as well as the events leading up to it. It was first published by Viking Press in 1998. The book won the first Samuel Johnson Prize, the Wolfson History Prize and the Hawthornden Prize for Literature in 1999.

== Content ==
The book starts with Operation Barbarossa, the German invasion of the Soviet Union in June 1941 and the subsequent drive into the Soviet Union. Its main focus is the Battle of Stalingrad, in particular the period from the initial German attack to Operation Uranus and the Soviet victory. It details the subsequent battles and war crimes committed by both sides. The book ends with the defeat and surrender of the Germans in February 1943 and the beginning of the Soviet advance on Germany. Beevor returned to the subject with his 2002 book Berlin: The Downfall 1945.

== Publication ==
Stalingrad was published in the Philippines under the title of Stalingrad: The Fateful Siege 1942–43, and has been translated into 18 languages. The English paperback version was published by Penguin Books in 1999.

- Antony Beevor, Stalingrad - Viking 1998 - ISBN 0-14-024985-0 (Paperback) and ISBN 0-670-87095-1 (Hardcover)

== Reception ==
Keith Lowe, writing in The Telegraph, notes that Stalingrad transformed both Beevor's reputation and that of military history, making it from something only for "retired colonels and armchair fantasists" into a "sleek, attention-grabbing subject" always on the bestseller lists. Lowe argues that "What made [Stalingrad] so refreshing was the way that he combined academic rigour with a storyteller’s sensibility. While he always kept a grip on the view of the battle from above, his true skill was in describing the way it looked from below, from the point of view of the ordinary soldiers", with pacing and sense of character providing almost the readability of a novel.

Richard Bernstein, in The New York Times, writes that "the colossal scale of Stalingrad, the megalomania, the utter absurdity, the sheer magnitude of the carnage in what many military historians see as the turning point in the war, are marvelously captured". He concludes that Stalingrad is "a fantastic and sobering story, and it has been fully and authoritatively told in Mr. Beevor's book."

== Prizes ==
Stalingrad won the first Samuel Johnson Prize, the Wolfson History Prize and the Hawthornden Prize for Literature in 1999.

== Ban of Russian translation in Ukraine ==
In 2018, a Russian translation of the book was banned by Ukrainian authorities, among other books. Beevor said he was "dumbfounded" at the decision to ban the import of 30,000 copies of the book. The ban was due to a law passed in 2016 which bans books imported from Russia if they included "anti-Ukrainian" content. The Kharkiv Human Rights Protection Group called the ban "baffling".

Serhiy Oliyinyk, the head of the State Committee for Television and Radio Broadcasting department on licensing and distribution-control, told Radio Free Europe/Radio Liberty that several paragraphs prevented the import of the books, citing a passage that purportedly said: "Ukrainian nationalists were tasked with shooting the children" so that they could "spare the feelings of SS Sonderkommando". He claimed that Beevor used NKVD reports as the source and that they were "not aware of such facts being revised at the Nuremberg tribunal", also accusing Beevor of falling for a "provocation". In response, Beevor called the statement by Oliyinyk untrue and stated that he used anti-Nazi German officer Helmuth Groscurth, who was a witness of the atrocity and reported it to another officer, as a source. Beevor also demanded an apology from Oliyinyk.

A Ukrainian translator said there were "significant differences" between the Russian translation and the original English version, with the English text referring to "two police battalions" that participated in the Babi Yar massacre, while the Russian translation refers to "two battalions of Ukrainian nationalists", and another instance regarding the 1941 Bila Tserkva massacre where "Ukrainian militiamen" was translated to "Ukrainian nationalists". (Note: In the context of World War II, "Ukrainian nationalists" usually means participants and supporters of Organization of Ukrainian Nationalists (OUN) or Ukrainian Insurgent Army (UPA).) Beevor called the first translation from 1999 "flawed" and said that, regarding the second translation from 2015, he would be "very surprised if anything had been slipped in there on the Russian side or anything had been distorted, because they are extremely responsible publishers." (Note: The book came out in Russian in two translations: Бивор, Энтони. Сталинград. / [пер. с англ. А. Жеребилова [и др.]] — Смоленск: Русич, 1999. — 445 с. — ISBN 5-8138-0056-5; Бивор, Энтони. Сталинград. / [пер. с англ. С. Саксина] — Москва: КоЛибри; Москва: Азбука-Аттикус, 2015. — 605 с. — ISBN 978-5-389-07862-8)

== Popular culture ==
In the first series of the British Channel 4 TV comedy Peep Show (2003), character Mark Corrigan (David Mitchell) owns a copy of Stalingrad. In an attempt to impress Toni, a neighbour he is trying to romance, he quotes facts he has learnt from Beevor's book. However, Mark is seen reading it throughout all nine series, implying that he has not actually finished the book in the 12 years that pass in the show.

In the TV adaption of The Night Manager, arms dealer Richard Roper (played by Hugh Laurie), has a copy of Stalingrad in his Majorcan villa.
