= D-Day: The Battle for Normandy =

2009 non-fiction book by Antony Beevor

- Front cover
- Author: Antony Beevor
- Language: English
- Subject: World War II
- Publisher: Viking Press
- Publication date: 2009
- Publication place: United Kingdom
- Media type: Print
- Pages: 608 pages
- ISBN: 0670021199

D-Day: The Battle for Normandy is a 2009 non-fiction book by Antony Beevor. The book covers the June 1944 Allied invasion of Normandy as well as the following weeks as the Allied armies fought eastward across France, and ends with the liberation of Paris. Beevor, who had previously written accounts of the Siege of Stalingrad and the Battle of Berlin, focused his narrative primarily on the experience of the individual soldier, writing more about life in the trenches and less from a bird's-eye perspective on tactics and strategies. He also took pains to emphasise the contributions and sacrifices of the French citizenry and members of the Resistance.

D-Day sold more than 100,000 copies in the first four months after its printing. Critics largely praised Beevor's ability to alternate between wide-scale descriptions of troop movements and small-scale anecdotes about bravery and cruelty on the front lines, as well as his depiction of German soldiers as human beings rather than villains. Some believed his treatment of central command and its tactics to be lacking, particularly in regards to his portrayal of the British general Bernard Montgomery.

== Background ==
Beevor was an officer in the British Army's 11th Hussars before becoming an author. He wrote a book on the Spanish Civil War which led him to become engrossed with World War II. He wrote bestsellers on the battles of Stalingrad and Berlin, and by 2009 had sold over a million copies of his books in the UK. Beevor's publisher requested that his next book be on the siege of Leningrad, but he had become so shaken from his experience writing about Stalingrad – stories of starvation and cannibalism had "literally put [him] off his food" – that he opted to write about the invasion of Normandy instead. He felt it had been too long since a general history of that theatre of war had been written, and that the existing literature rarely wrote about D-Day and the Battle of Normandy together, as he intended to do.

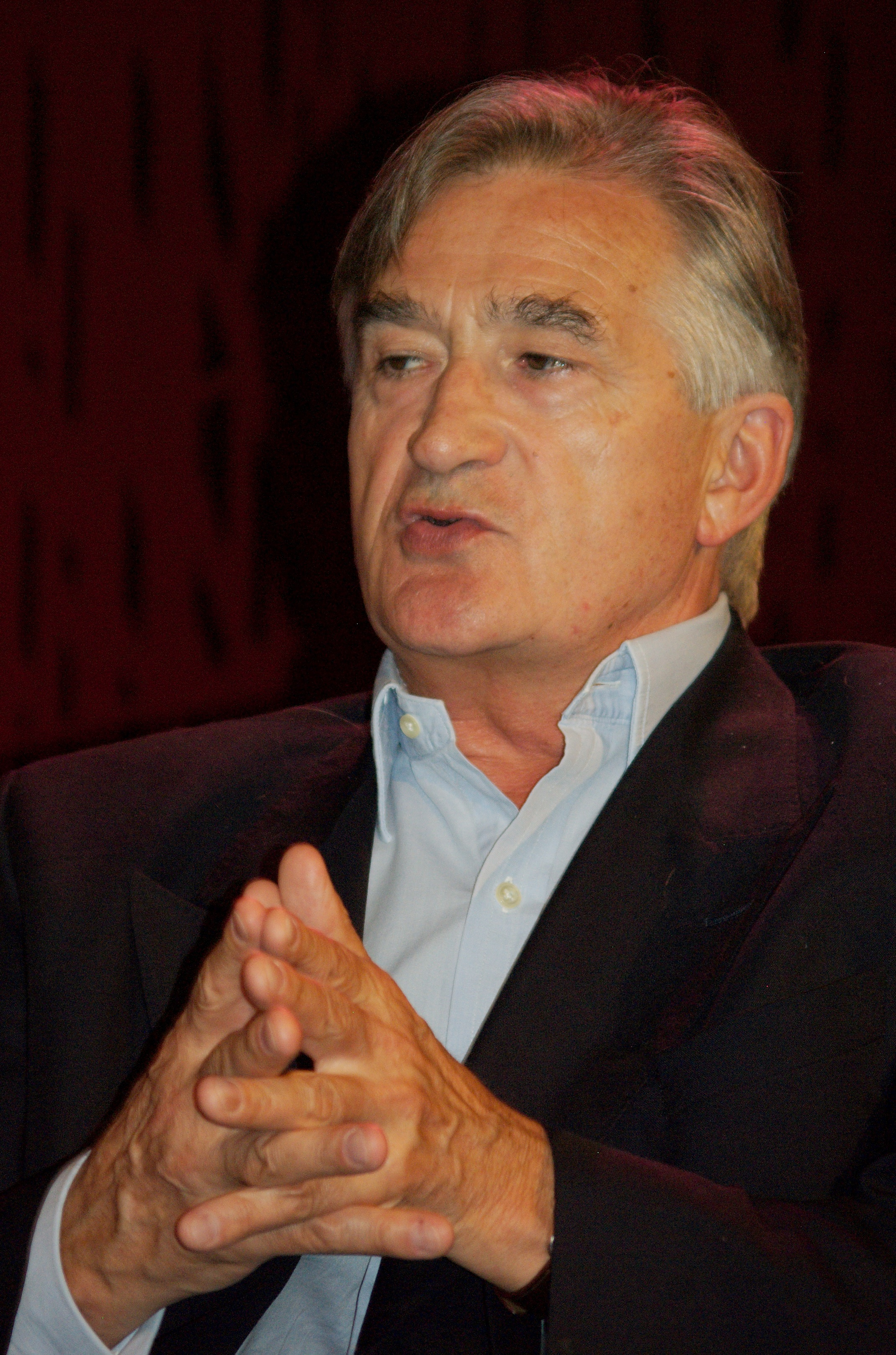
Beevor in 2009

The book took Beevor over three years to research. He was helped in that regard by Russian World War II archives that had been recently unsealed, and which assisted Beevor in comparing the Eastern and Western fronts during the war. He also found and used audio recordings of interviews with Allied soldiers following their return from battle. These contemporary interviews meant the subjects' memories about the war were fresher and more likely to be accurate than later ones with veterans. The soldiers tended to be more candid in these interviews as well, with many casually admitting to the shooting of German prisoners.

== Synopsis ==
D-Day opens at the beginning of June 1944 with Allied personnel agonising over inclement weather in preparation for their invasion of the Normandy coast. In his narrative, Beevor bypasses the months of Operation Overlord's planning, with the exception of some description of the deceptive Operation Fortitude. The events of D-Day itself comprise relatively little of the book's content, with its recount of the invasion's first day consisting of less than a third of the book and Beevor's description of the events of Omaha Beach totaling just 25 pages. The remainder of the book covers the following weeks as Allied forces fought eastward across France.

Beevor describes the Allies' unsuccessful attempt to facilitate the Normandy beach landings with a preliminary bombing campaign. Bombing crews, concerned with hitting the approaching fleet, waited too long to drop their payloads, causing their bombs to largely miss the German defenses. (Later in the book, Beevor laments less cautious American crews who caused numerous casualties due to inaccurate "friendly fire".) Beevor writes of the German army which, in the face of that bombing and the sheer size of the Allied armada, "did not flinch". The ferocity with which the outmanned Germans fought over the course of the battle earned the Allies' begrudging respect.

The book describes each side's respective advantages and disadvantages during the campaign. While the Allies had more soldiers and enjoyed air superiority, the Germans had better quality weaponry and the propaganda-influenced belief that the very existence of their homeland was at stake. Each side had its difficulties with high command. Beevor praises General Dwight Eisenhower's diplomacy, but remarks that General Bernard Montgomery – the ranking ground commander for the campaign – suffered from a "breathtaking conceit which almost certainly stemmed from some kind of inferiority complex", and refers to General George Patton as a prima donna. Command of the German forces in France when D-Day occurred was perplexingly split between Generals Erwin Rommel and Gerd von Rundstedt, who knew an invasion was likely but disagreed about how to handle it. The German command structure was needlessly confusing, and overseeing it all was a Hitler who had convinced himself of the invincibility of the Atlantic Wall.

Beevor's account focuses less than many similar books on the wider scope of the Battle of Normandy and more on the experiences of its participants, both soldier and civilian. He often alternates between the war's large-scale movements and small-scale anecdotes as well as between dark moments and lighter ones. He also recounts tales of heroism and bravery alongside those of lawlessness and cruelty. Many of the battle's participants were simply trying to make it home alive and wanted "somebody else to play the hero"; he notes that there were frequently zero shots fired by up to half of the soldiers in a given battle. Beevor also emphasises the extreme stress soldiers were under, particularly those subjected to prolonged artillery fire. The US Army treated 30,000 soldiers for combat exhaustion, he writes, adding: "While some soldiers resorted to self-inflicted wounds [in order to leave combat], a smaller, unknown number committed suicide."

Allied progression eastward met numerous obstacles, not only from stiff German resistance but also infighting amongst high command, difficulties managing the French citizenry, and a Charles de Gaulle who was determined to be at the head of France's new government. The Allies also had to contend with the consequences of their own actions, as in discovering that their extensive bombing of cities like Caen only made progression through the ruins more difficult. Beevor argues that were it not for almost total Allied air superiority – Rommel is said to have asked "What's happened to our proud Luftwaffe?" – the advance could well have stalled. The book goes on to describe the drawn out fighting during the battle for Hill 112, the assassination plot against Hitler, the battle of the Falaise pocket. and the final push to liberate Paris, which was not part of the original Operation Overlord plan.

The book emphasises the contributions made by the French Resistance as well as the sacrifices made by French civilians. Beevor estimates that between the bombings leading up to the invasion and the Normandy campaign itself, more than 34,000 French civilians were killed, with 3,000 dying in the first 24 hours alone. Beevor draws a contrast between the general bravery of the citizens and the behavior of French mobs who enacted "épuration sauvage", or unofficial purges, following liberation. People suspected to have collaborated with the Nazis often had their heads shaven and were paraded through streets, and many were killed. At least 14,000 died during the purges, many of them women. Beevor is sympathetic to the French citizenry overall, and writes that "the cruel martyrdom of Normandy had indeed saved the rest of France".

== Analysis ==
The critics William L. O'Neill, Alistair Horne, Stephen A. Bourque, and Richard Mullen all acknowledged that there is a copious amount of existing literature on D-Day and that there may not seem to be a need for another. However, they variously argue that the length of time since another major retrospective, as well as Beevor's approach of extending the narrative beyond D-Day itself and into the rest of the Normandy campaign along with his focus on previously under-analysed aspects of the battle justify the book's existence. The critic Lawrence Freedman noted the shifting norms of historical literature as a reason the book was welcome in the 21st century, writing that "there is now an expectation that war will be described not solely from the viewpoint of the politician and the general but from that of the soldier, too".

Jonathan Yardley observed that Beevor found himself drawn to the individual level of the war more often than a bird's eye view: "Beevor is less interested in moving troops from pillar to post than in telling us what war was like for them and for the civilians whose paths they crossed". Similarly, Giles Foden wrote that "it is the personal narratives of ordinary servicemen that drives this book", and Bourque remarked that one of the book's strengths is its inclusion of the "human experience". Of particular note to Dominic Sandbrook was Beevor's treatment of Germans, saying that "in stark contrast to Hollywood war films, the Germans appear here as real people with virtues as well as vices". Horne also wrote that the book's depiction of the war experience for the typical German soldier was "fair".

Some reviewers were mixed in regards to the book's treatment of the operation's high command, particularly its portrayal of the British general Bernard Montgomery. Foden wrote that Beevor approached the debate of Montgomery's performance during the war with "balance and judgment",, while O'Neill agreed with Beevor that Montgomery's behavior was a "diplomatic disaster", writing that "A less politic supreme commander than Eisenhower would have had him sacked for insubordination on more than one occasion." The Montgomery biographer Horne, however, was critical of both Beevor's description of Montgomery ("almost every reference to him contain[ed] a slur") and his diminishment of the general's role in the Allied success. Mullen similarly wrote that the book "does not do justice to Montgomery's great contribution" to the war effort.

Some critics were divided on the book's place in the pantheon of works about Operation Overlord. Bourque felt the volume to be a satisfactory encapsulation of the battle, one oriented towards scholar and general reader alike, and the only one needed to fully understand the material. Conversely, O'Neill wrote that D-Day focused overmuch on the microcosmic nature of the campaign and missed the big picture. He added that Stephen Ambrose's D-Day, June 6, 1944 (1994) is a superior account of D-Day itself, while works such as John Keegan's Six Armies in Normandy (1982) and Max Hastings's Overlord: D-Day and the Battle for Normandy (1984) covered the entirety of the Normandy campaign more satisfyingly.

== Reception ==
D-Day sold over 100,000 copies in the four months following its publication. It was critically acclaimed, but received no awards. Reviewers for both the Washington Post and The Guardian were impressed with Beevor's focus on the war's massive toll, with the Post's Jonathan Yardley writing "the [war's] cost, which Antony Beevor is at pains to emphasize in this fine book, was awful beyond comprehension", and The Guardian's Dominic Sandbrook saying that the Normandy campaign "was a turning point in the war and we are right to celebrate it. But the tragedy, as this splendid book makes clear, is that it came at such a cost."

Writing for Time Magazine, the author Lev Grossman wrote that "D-Day is a vibrant work of history that honors the sacrifice of tens of thousands of men and women. Which is serious praise." The reviewer for Foreign Affairs, Lawrence Freedman, praised Beevor's accounting of the unpredictability of war, while in The Sunday Telegraph, historian Andrew Roberts appreciated "this most humanitarian work of military history" and its attention to the individual. Kirkus Reviews wrote that "Beevor gets better with each book."

In The Boston Globe, military historian Nigel Hamilton acknowledged the "intelligently told and nicely documented" opening section of the book, but believed that Beevor faltered when describing the rest of the Normandy campaign. He argued that the omission of details regarding the overarching Allied plan harmed the narrative, and continued: "By page 400, most general readers will be lost in the fog of names, ranks, regiments, villages, and hilltops, the account having turned into a hop-scotching circus in the bocage of Normandy that becomes a battle of attrition aimed primarily at the reader." The Wall Street Journal's Alistair Horne also praised aspects of D-Day but was critical in other regards, writing that the book's "serious fault" laid in Beevor's "failure to comprehend the problems and challenges faced by higher command. He criticizes but produces no new insights."
