= Shirley Becke =

British police officer (1917–2011)

Commander Shirley Becke OBE QPM

Head of A4 Branch (Women Police), Metropolitan Police
- In office 26 May 1966 – 1973

Personal details
- Born: Shirley Cameron Jennings; April 29, 1917 Chiswick, London, England
- Died: October 25, 2011 (aged 94) Chichester, West Sussex, England
- Education: Westminster Polytechnic
- Known for: first woman officer in the United Kingdom to reach chief officer rank

Shirley Cameron Becke OBE QPM (née Jennings; 29 April 1917 – 25 October 2011) was a British police officer. She was the fourth and last commander of the London Metropolitan Police's A4 Branch (Women Police), from 1966 to 1973, and the first woman officer in the United Kingdom to reach chief officer rank when she was promoted to commander in 1969.

== Early life ==
Shirley Cameron Jennings was born in Chiswick, London, the daughter of a gas engineer. She was educated at Ealing Grammar School for Girls and followed in her father's footsteps, training as a gas engineer at Westminster Polytechnic from 1935, and in 1939 became the first woman to pass the Higher Grade Examination of the Institution of Gas Engineers. She then worked as a gas engineer for two years.

== Police career ==
Becke joined the Metropolitan Police as a constable in 1941, intending her service to be purely for the duration of the Second World War, but stayed in the force after the war. In 1945 she joined the Criminal Investigation Department (CID) as a detective constable and the following year transferred to West End Central police station, working with Barbara Kelley, later to become Britain's first detective chief superintendent. In November 1945, Reuben 'Russian Robert' Martirosoff was murdered. Becke posed as the fiancée of one of the two suspects to gain information about their whereabouts that would see them captured and ultimately hanged for their crimes. She was promoted to detective sergeant in 1952, detective inspector in 1957, and detective chief inspector in 1959, when she was posted to Scotland Yard as the Metropolitan Police's most senior woman detective.

In 1954, she was called to the headquarters of an oil company in Mayfair by the company's accountant to investigate a theft. She later married the accountant, Justin Becke, who was later ordained and became Church of England vicar of South Merstham, Surrey. She thus became the first head of London's policewomen to be married.

In 1960, Becke was promoted to superintendent and returned to uniform, taking command of the women police in the South-West Area. Eighteen months later she returned to Scotland Yard as second-in-command of A4 Branch. She took command of A4 Branch with the rank of chief superintendent on 26 May 1966, 25 years to the day after she joined the force. She was awarded the Queen's Police Medal (QPM) in 1972.

In 1973, A4 Branch was disbanded and women police officers integrated with the general establishment. Becke, then a commander, was appointed to the Force Inspectorate. That same year Sheila Ward became the Metropolitan Police's first female station inspector.

== Later life and death ==
Becke retired from the police on 29 April 1974 and took up a position as regional administrator for London of the Women's Royal Voluntary Service. She retired from this post in 1979, but also served as vice-chairman of the WRVS from 1976 to 1983. She was appointed Officer of the Order of the British Empire (OBE) in 1974.

Becke died in Chichester, West Sussex, on 25 October 2011. Her funeral was held in the Lady Chapel of Chichester Cathedral on 14 November 2011.

== Footnotes ==
Police appointments
Preceded by Winifred Barker	Commander, A4 Branch (Women Police), Metropolitan Police; 1966–1973	Succeeded by Last incumbent
