= Bertha Clayden =

British police officer

Chief Inspector Bertha Clayden

Deputy Head of A4 Branch (Women Police), Metropolitan Police
- In office 30 April 1934 – ?

Personal details
- Born: Alice Bertha Clayden; 1881
- Died: 1958 (aged 76–77)

Alice Bertha Clayden (1881−1958) was a British police officer.

== Life ==
She had three brothers in the Metropolitan Police and when all but twenty of that force's women police were dismissed in 1922 Clayden was put in charge of them, becoming the first attested female officer to hold the rank of Inspector. When Dorothy Peto was appointed Superintendent in charge of women police in 1930, Clayden remained as Woman Inspector at Bow Street. On 30 April 1934 she was promoted to Sub-Divisional Inspector, the first (and possibly only) woman to hold that rank, and became deputy to Peto at Scotland Yard. She seems to have eventually reached the rank of Chief Inspector. A motherly woman, her officers considered her to be far more approachable than the austere Peto.
