= Aerial roof markings =

Vehicle markings for aerial identification

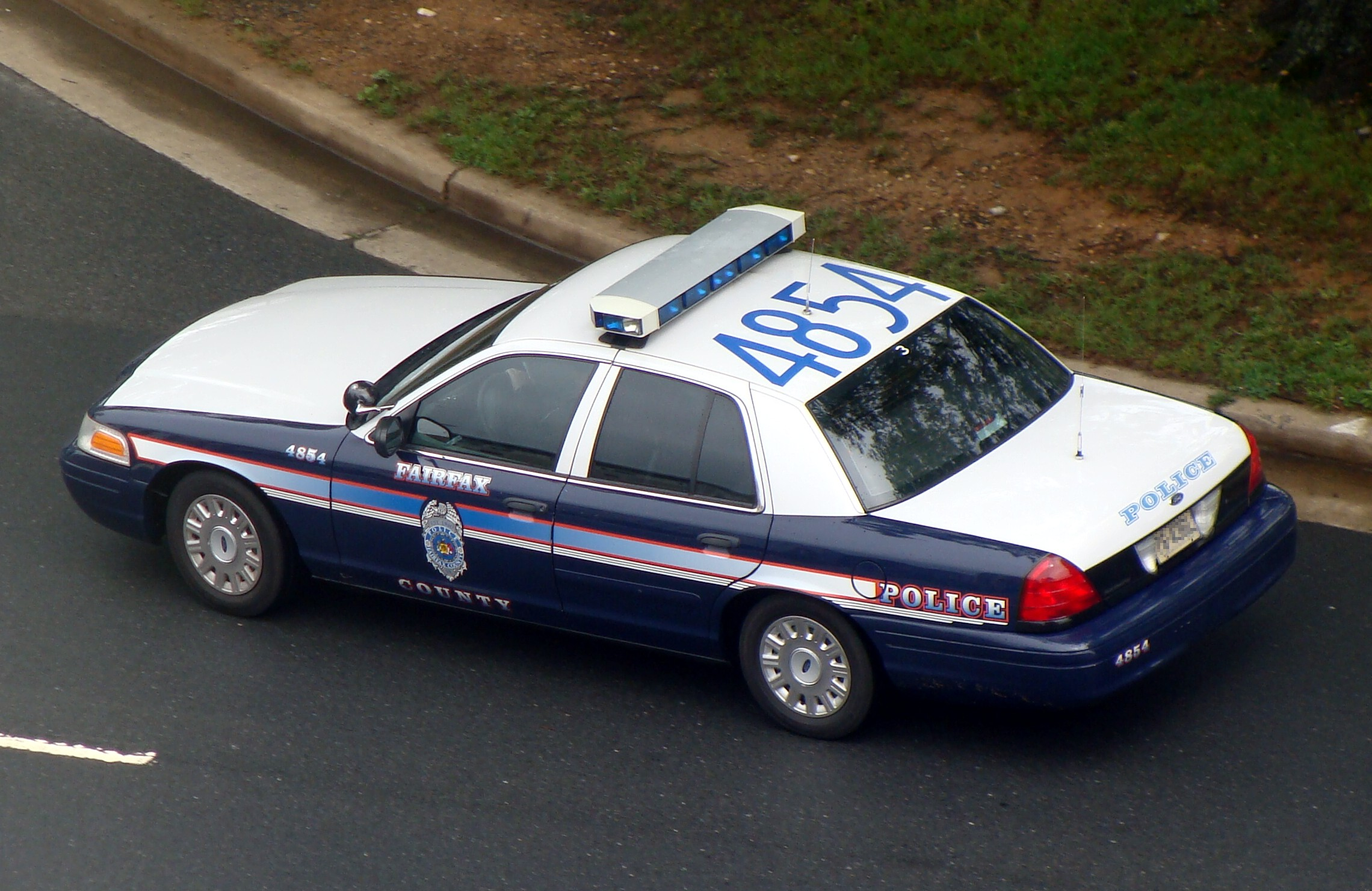
A roof number on the top of a Ford Crown Victoria Police Interceptor operated by the Fairfax County Police Department. Depending on departmental policy, this could mean it is either unit #4854 (identifying a specific officer and assignment), or car #4854 (identifying a specific vehicle in the agency's fleet).

Aerial roof markings are symbols, letters, or numbers on the top of fleet vehicles to allow aircraft or closed-circuit television cameras to identify them from overhead. The purpose of these marking vary, but are generally used to identify a specific vehicle, vehicle type, operator, assignment, or role. The markings are commonly placed on the roof of the vehicle, but can also be placed on the hood, trunk, or other parts of the vehicle visible from above. They are commonly found on emergency vehicles such as police vehicles, fire engines, ambulances, and coast guard vehicles, but also cash-in-transit vans, buses, and boats.

== Australia ==
Different state police forces in Australia use different aerial roof markings to designate specific vehicles, duty types and areas.

=== New South Wales Police Force ===
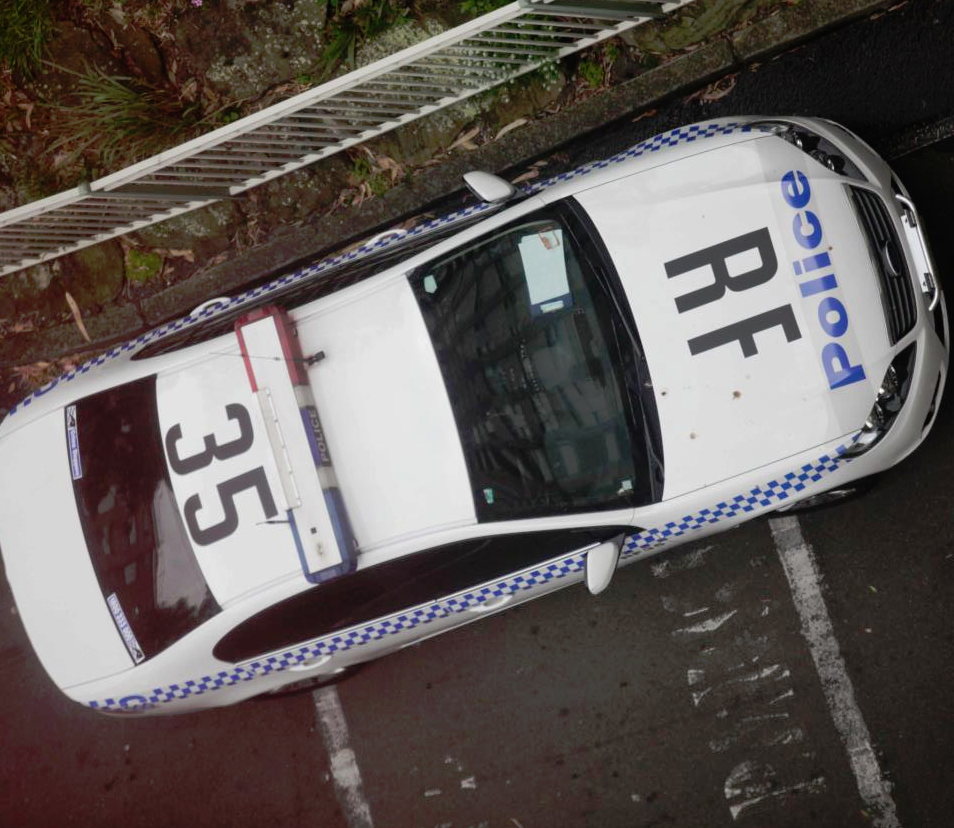
Redfern Local Area Command 35, displaying aerial markings on the roof and bonnet. "RF" denotes the Command, being Redfern, while "35" denotes its use as a general duties sedan.

Local Area Commands vehicle bonnet/roof codes

AB	Albury	AS	Ashfield	BA	Barwon	BB	Botany Bay	BK	Bankstown		
BL	Blue Mountains	BN	Blacktown	BR	Barrier	BU	Burwood	BW	Brisbane Water		
CA	Campsie	CB	Canobolas	CBL	Coleambally	CC	Coffs/Clarence	CEH	Central Hunter		
CF	Chifley	CM	Cabramatta	CN	Camden	CS	Castlereagh	CT	Campbelltown		
CU	Cootamundra	DL	Darling River	DP	Darlington Point	DQ	Deniliquin	EB	Eastern Beaches		
ES	Eastern Suburbs	EW	Eastwood	FA	Fairfield	FL	Flemington	FS	Far South Coast		
GF	Griffith	GL	Gladesville	GN	Goulburn	GV	Green Valley	HB	Hawkesbury		
HI	The Hills	HR	Holroyd	HS	Harbourside	HU	Hurstville	HV	Hunter Valley		
JN	Junee	K	Kempsey	KU	Ku-Ring-Gai	KX	Kings Cross	LE	Leichhardt		
LI	Lake Illawarra	LL	Lachlan	LM	Lake Macquarie	LP	Liverpool	MD	Mount Druitt		
ME	Mudgee	MF	Macquarie Fields	MG	Manning/Great Lakes	MI	Miranda	ML	Manly		
MN	Monaro	MNC	Mid North Coast	MR	Marrickville	NEP	Nepean	NB	Northern Beaches	NTH	Northern Highway Patrol
NCC	Newcastle City	ND	New England	NS	North Shore	NT	Newtown	NTH	North		
OR	Orana	OX	Oxley	PA	Parramatta	PTS	Port Stephens				
QH	Quakers Hill	RB	Rose Bay	RF	Redfern	RH	Rosehill	RM	Richmond		
RY	Ryde	SC	Sydney City	SG	St George	SH	Surry Hills				
SU	Sutherland	SV	Shoalhaven	TB	Tweed/Byron	TF	Tenterfield	TL	Tuggerah Lakes		
WG	Wollongong	WW	Wagga Wagga								

=== Fire appliances in New South Wales ===
Fire and Rescue NSW fit aerial identification markings to appliances that are indicative of the vehicles call sign. Example: "RP001" indicates the appliance is the Rescue Pumper belonging to station 001, the City of Sydney, while HH077 indicates the Heavy Hazmat support truck from St Marys fire station.

Fire and Rescue NSW aerial roof ID codes

AP	Aerial Pump	CT	Compressed Air Foam System (CAFS) Tanker	DC	Duty Commander
FIRU	Fire Investigations & Research Unit	H (HH)	Hazmat (Heavy Hazmat)	HH	Heavy Hazmat
HP	Hazmat Pumper	HT	Hazmat Tanker	ICV	Incident Control Vehicle
LP	Ladder Platform	LSV	Logistical Support Vehicle	P	Pumper
R (HR)	Rescue (Heavy Rescue)	RP	Rescue Pumper	RT	Rescue Tanker
SEV	Service Exchange Vehicle (spare)	USAR	Urban Search and Rescue		

The New South Wales Rural Fire Service fits aerial identification numbers to rural fire appliances with the format consisting of the letter "B" (for Bush Fire) and the last 4 digits of the vehicles RTA approved operations plate. Example: "BF-07967" allocates an aerial ID of "7967". These markings do not denote a vehicles callsign.

The South Australian Country Fire Service have an infrared beacon on the roof of most new appliances and the vehicle call sign. As all trucks are named and numbered according to their location, capacity and capability (e.g. Hynam 34, Location: Hynam, 3000L, 4WD or Belair 34P, Location Belair, 3000L, 4WD, Pumper), their call sign is also placed on the roof of the cab in a red text on white roof fashion. Older State Emergency Service vehicles, primarily in country areas, may have their call sign on the roof as well.

== United Kingdom ==
=== Police vehicles ===
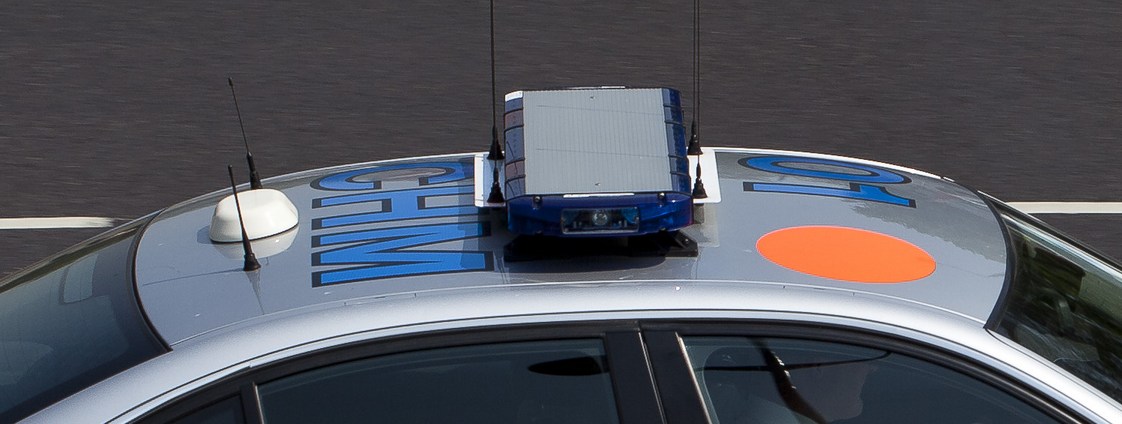
Aerial roof markings on London Metropolitan police car

Police vehicles in the United Kingdom have markings of symbols, letters and numbers on their tops to enable aircraft to identify them. These markings show the use of the vehicle, its force code and a vehicle identifying mark or the police division to which the vehicle belongs.

Not every vehicle displays markings, but those involved in response and traffic generally do. This factor stems from guidelines of the Association of Chief Police Officers relating to police air operations and pursuit management.

==== Vehicle usage markings ====
Vehicle usage markings

- Armed response vehicle (ARV) used by armed police from various police units – 5 point asterisk *
- General (incident response vehicle or area car)/Traffic – circle ●
- Dog support unit (DSU) – triangle ▲
- Public order (PO) personnel carrier – square ◼
- Police medics. Some policing vehicles such as ARVs and IRVs may have major first aid and fire equipment installed with trained officers aboard – green cross +

On a typical vehicle roof layout, the vehicle usage marking is preceded by an integer PNC Force Identifier; the individual (and within each organisation, unique) Vehicle Identifier, commonly alphanumeric, should occupy a second line all by itself.

==== Unique PNC force code ====
The Police National Computer (PNC) is used by UK police forces and other government agencies to store and retrieve data about people, vehicles, plant and government locations. Regarding roof markings, their inscription helps identifying the regional or institutional affiliation of each vehicle. PNC force codes are also used when custody records are created, when items are submitted to places such as the Forensic Science Service laboratory, when evidence is stored, or when documents are to be passed from one force to another. They also form the first two digits of any certificate issued under the Firearms Act since the introduction of the National Firearms Licensing Management System. For example, a licence issued by the Metropolitan Police will start with '02'.

PNC Code	Force
01	Metropolitan Police
02	Metropolitan Police
03	Cumbria Constabulary
04	Lancashire Constabulary
05	Merseyside Police
06	Greater Manchester Police
07	Cheshire Constabulary
08	Criminal Cases Review Commission
09	Post Office Security
10	Northumbria Police
11	Durham Constabulary
12	North Yorkshire Police
13	West Yorkshire Police
14	South Yorkshire Police
15	Royal Military Police and RAF Police
16	Humberside Police
17	Cleveland Police
18	Department of Trade and Industry
19	X400 Interface Broadcasts
20	West Midlands Police
21	Staffordshire Police
22	West Mercia Police
23	Warwickshire Police
24	Ministry of Defence Police
25	PNC Hendon
26	PNC Horseferry (Testing)
27	PNC Testing
28	PNC Restart terminals 1
29	PNC Restart terminals 2
30	Derbyshire Constabulary
31	Nottinghamshire Police
32	Lincolnshire Police
33	Leicestershire Constabulary
34	Northamptonshire Police
35	Cambridgeshire Constabulary
36	Norfolk Constabulary
37	Suffolk Constabulary
39	NPT (formerly CTS)
40	Bedfordshire Police
41	Hertfordshire Constabulary
42	Essex Police
43	Thames Valley Police
44	Hampshire and Isle of Wight Constabulary
45	Surrey Police
46	Kent Police
47	Sussex Police
48	City of London Police
49	Kent Ports Police
50	Devon & Cornwall Police

PNC Code	Government department
51	Force 51 (out of use)
52	Avon & Somerset Constabulary
53	Gloucestershire Constabulary
54	Wiltshire Police
55	Dorset Police
56	Guernsey Police
57	States of Jersey Police
58	Port of Dover Police
59	Civil Nuclear Constabulary
60	North Wales Police
61	Gwent Police
62	South Wales Police
63	Dyfed-Powys Police
64	National Ports Office
65	National Joint Unit
66	Nuclear Information Service
67	National Crime Agency (formerly NCIS)
68	Government Communications Headquarters
69	Home Office Immigration Enforcement
70	Police Scotland (formerly Dumfries & Galloway Police)
71	Royal Navy NIS Liaison
72	Royal Air Force
73	Army NIS Liaison
74	Police Scotland (formerly Strathclyde Police)
75	HSE Nuclear Directorate
76	Police Scotland (formerly Lothian & Borders Police)
77	Department for Work and Pensions
78	Police Scotland (formerly Fife Constabulary)
79	Bramshill Police College
80	Police Scotland (formerly Tayside Police)
81	Ministry of Defence (United Kingdom) Security
82	Police Scotland (formerly Grampian Police)
83	Police Scotland (formerly Scottish Police College)
84	Police Scotland (formerly Central Scotland Police)
85	Inland Revenue
86	His Majesty's Prison Service
87	Police Scotland (formerly Northern Constabulary)
88	HM Customs and Excise
89	Department of the Environment
90	Police Scotland (formerly Scottish Crime and Drug Enforcement Agency)
91	National Crime Agency (formerly National Crime Squad)
92	National Automated Fingerprint Identification System
93	British Transport Police
94	Driver and Vehicle Licensing Agency
95	Criminal Records Bureau
96	Police Scotland (formerly SPSA)
97	Isle of Man Constabulary
98	Police Service of Northern Ireland
99	Criminal Records Bureau
100	Departmental Security Units

=== Thermal roof markings ===
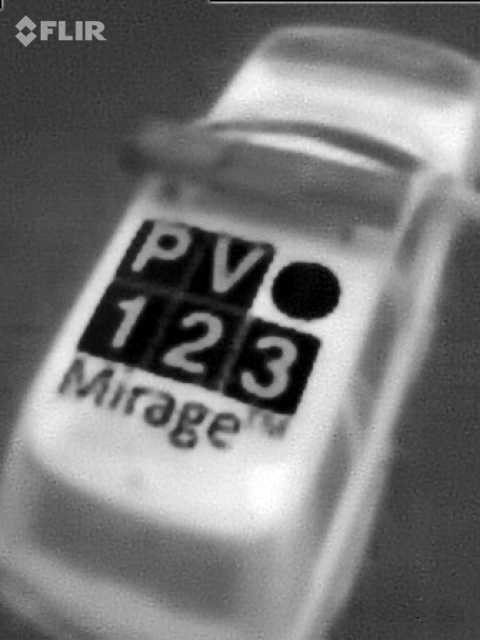
Thermal roof markings seen through a thermal camera

In 2004, the UK Home Office, under direction from the Technical and Training Committee of ACPO Air Operations were tasked with improving the recognition and identification of police vehicles amongst other traffic, particularly when operating at night. Colour images show the flashing blue lights but other details are lost, and a thermal camera image would show the vehicles and surroundings, but the livery and roofbar lighting could not be seen. The preferred solution was to make the police vehicle distinguishable when viewed with a thermal camera.

Working with Qinetiq, they developed a thermally reflective marking film and issued the publication "Thermal Roof Markings for Police Vehicles 43/04". These markings reflect infrared light back to the thermal imager, resulting in a contrast between the cold reflection and the ground or vehicle temperature. Being passive in nature, they require no activity on the part of the air observer or vehicle crew, nor any power from the vehicle.

=== Public buses ===
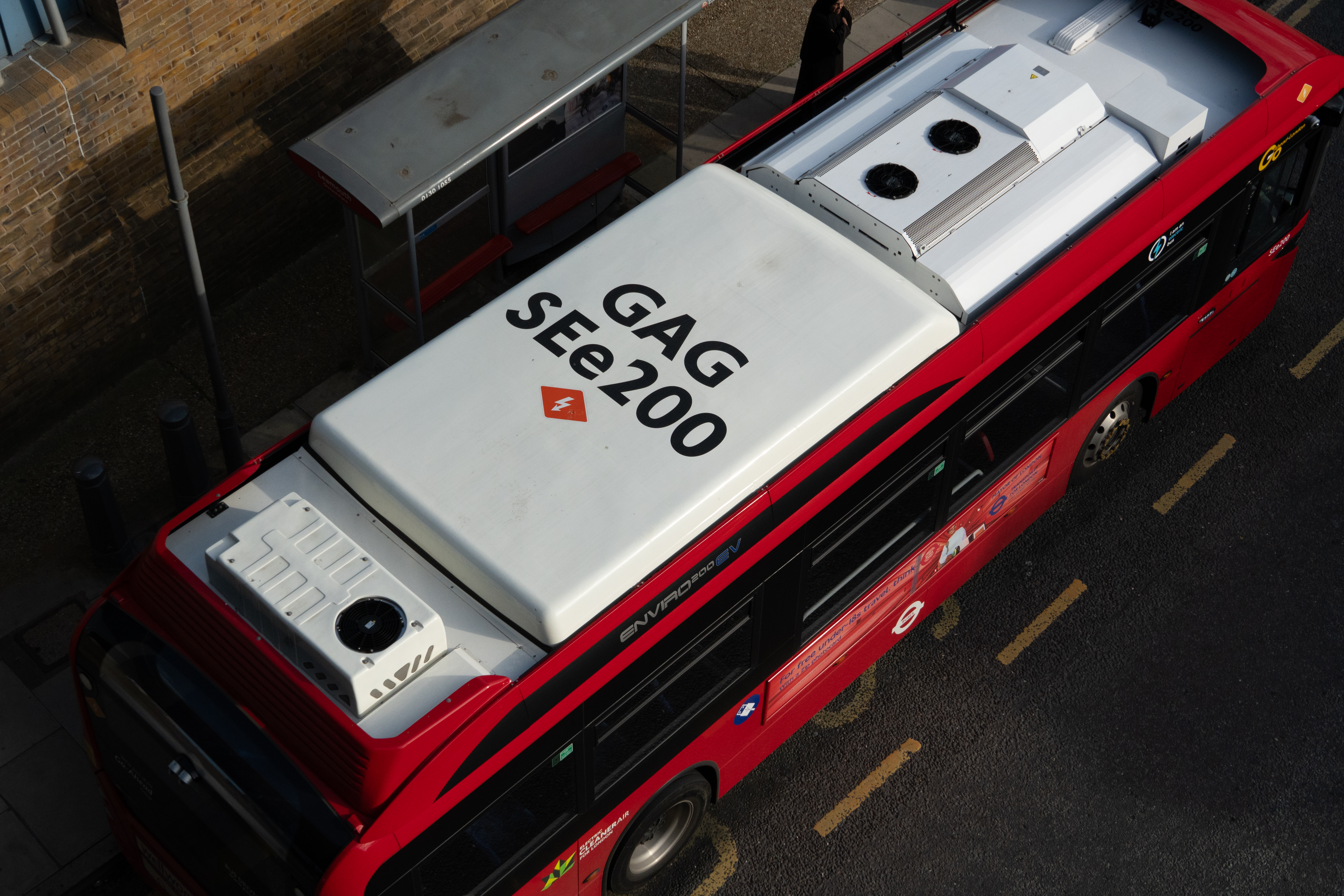
Aerial roof markings on a London battery electric bus

From 2006 onwards, single and double-decker buses operating London Buses services began having their roofs painted in heat-reflective white as part of a scheme to cool down their interiors in hot summer weather. This would eventually coincide with the introduction of roof markings, as shown in the image opposite. The first three letters denote the operator (GAG is Go-Ahead Group) and the remaining letters and numbers are the fleet number (SEe200), which also appears on the front and rear of the vehicle.

From 2023, lozenge-shaped stickers denoting the type of fuel the bus runs on (grey for diesel and 'smart' or 'mild hybrids', orange for electric, blue for hydrogen), placed on the roof below the fleet number of the bus, were rolled out onto every London bus by Transport for London contracted bus operators for ease of identification by the emergency services.

Operator codes include:

- ARL, Arriva London
- GAG, Go-Ahead Group
- MTG, Metroline
- ABL, Transport UK (formerly known as Abellio)
- SCG, Stagecoach Group
- LUB, First Bus London (formerly known as RATP Dev Transit London)

== Germany ==
=== Fire vehicles ===
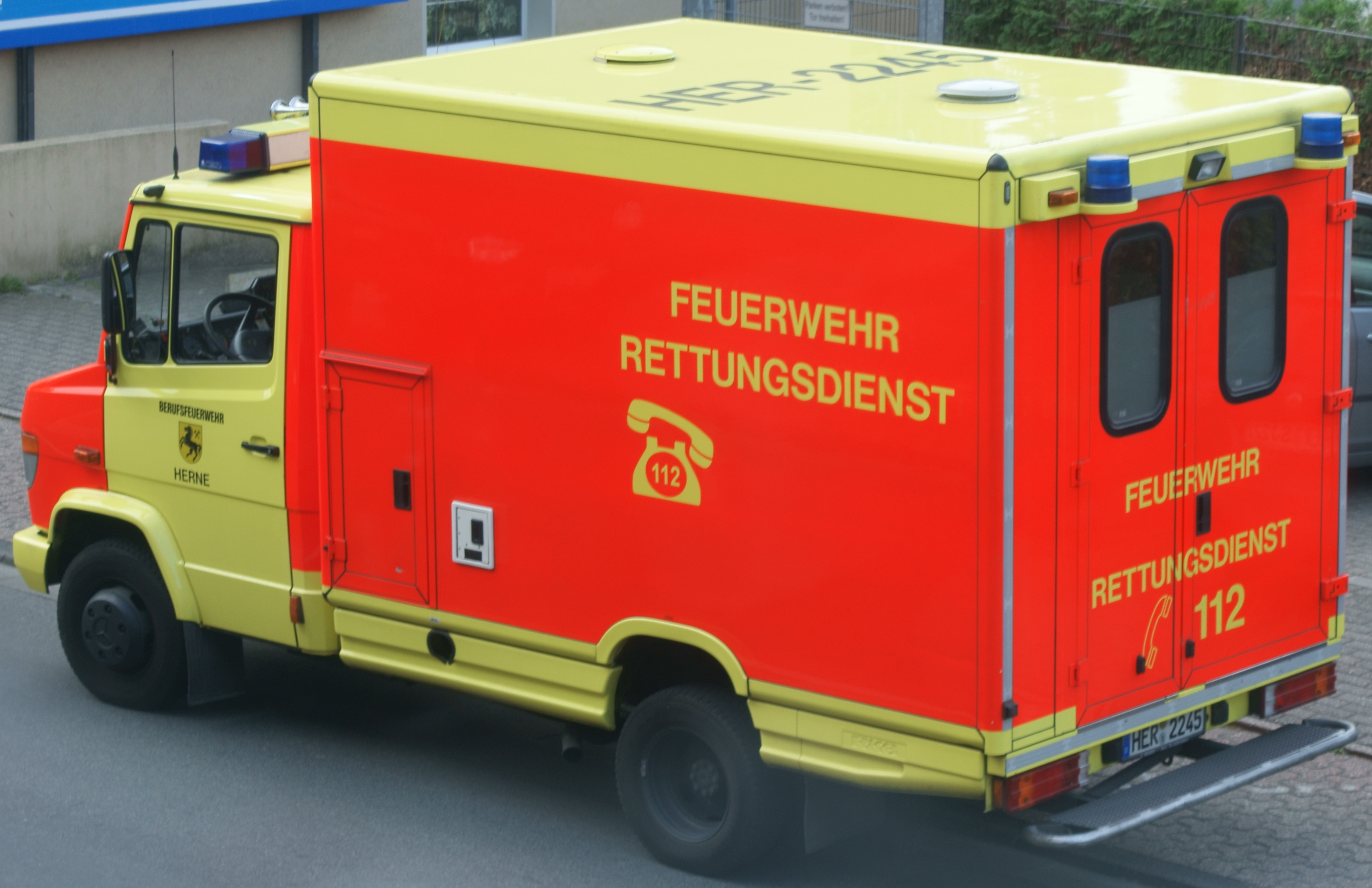
Aerial roof markings displaying the registration of an ambulance operated by the Herne city fire service

In Germany, DIN 14035, "Dachkennzeichen für Feuerwehrfahrzeuge" (Roof Marking of Fire Engines), issued in November 1981, defines that fire engines should carry their registration plate number; these include the one-to-three letter abbreviation code of the corresponding Landkreis, thus making regional origin self-evident. The inscription is recommended to be at least 40 cm in size; the font color should, in terms of roof painting, be "white on red", or "black on white and aluminium/metallic".

As DIN standards are, however, not generally binding in Germany, but mere recommendations, the scheme is not used everywhere, with some fire companies preferring visually appealing inscriptions such as company name or logo. Many others show their cars' radio call signs (traditionally "Florian ##", cf. de:Funkrufname); over the years, various local efforts have been made to match both designations, aided by district administrations that reserved registered car like designations on principle.

== European Union ==
=== Ambulances ===
CEN 1789, "Medical vehicles and their equipment - Road ambulances", reissued in 2007, recommends in its "informative" annex A "Recognition", that roofs of ambulance vehicles should bear the Red Cross/Crescent Emblems or the Star of Life.

== Canada ==
Aerial roof markings are used by Toronto Police Service (# of cruiser) and Toronto EMS (Toronto EMS with region and number) to provide identification from the air. In the Metro Vancouver, British Columbia area, the various police forces have their specific municipal code and vehicle number on the roof for airborne identification.
