= Dorothy Peto =

English police officer (1886–1974)

Superintendent Dorothy Peto OBE KPFSM
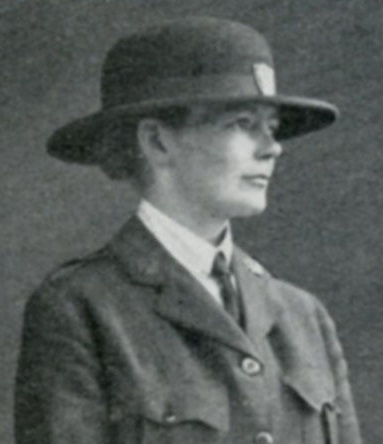
- Peto as head of the training school in Bristol, c. 1917

Head of A4 Branch (Women Police), Metropolitan Police
- In office April 1932 – 15 December 1946

Staff Officer, Women's Section, Metropolitan Police
- In office April 1930 – April 1932

Personal details
- Born: Dorothy Olivia Georgiana Peto; 15 December 1886 Emery Down, Hampshire, England
- Died: 26 February 1974 (aged 87) Alton, Hampshire, England
- Occupation: Police officer

Dorothy Olivia Georgiana Peto OBE KPFSM (15 December 1886 – 26 February 1974) was an English police officer. She was a pioneer of women policing in the United Kingdom who served as the first attested woman superintendent in the London Metropolitan Police, from 1930 to 1946.

== Life ==
Peto was born in Emery Down, near Lyndhurst, Hampshire. Her father, Morton Kelsall Peto, was a builder and noted landscape artist, and her grandfather was Sir Morton Peto, 1st Baronet. She was educated at home and began writing novels. She was not successful in this endeavour and in 1914 joined the National Union of Women Workers women patrols, an unofficial organisation which patrolled the streets to maintain public morality and decency during the First World War.

She was Assistant Patrol Organiser in Bath and from January 1915 was deputy director of the NUWW's patrol training school in Bristol. In 1917, she succeeded Flora Joseph as director of the school and in 1918 also became director of the Federated Training Schools for Policewomen and Patrols, which also included the schools in Liverpool and Glasgow

In 1919, the schools closed and Peto attempted to obtain a position as an attested police officer, as several police forces were now recruiting women. She had some difficulty, particularly since she was not willing to accept a rank lower than Inspector, and in November 1920 accepted an unattested position as a Female Enquiry Officer with Birmingham City Police. (Note: The ODNB says Liverpool City Police, but the other sources say Birmingham.) In 1924, following her father's death and her need for a better salary, she resigned and became a travelling organiser for the National Council for Combating Venereal Diseases, renamed the British Social Hygiene Council in 1925. In 1927, she joined Liverpool City Police as director of the city's ten policewomen.

In April 1930, Peto transferred to the Metropolitan Police as Staff Officer in charge of the Women's Section, with the attested rank of Superintendent. In May 1931, she became the first female member of the Police Council. In April 1932, she took command of her own branch of the Metropolitan Police, A4 Branch (Women Police). Peto was credited with using the Children and Young Persons Act 1933 to take ownership of cases involving child abuse and based on that she established a special role for policewomen. Within five years it was noted that the majority of interviews with women involved in indecency was being taken by policewomen where they were available. Her arguments along these lines continued and in 1943 she increased the number of policewomen further by drawing the commissioner's attention to juvenile delinquency, broken homes and the general problems created by the Second World War.

She retired on 15 December 1946, having seen the expansion of the branch from 55 officers to over 200, about half the total number of female police officers in Britain.

== Awards and legacy ==
Peto was appointed Officer of the Order of the British Empire (OBE) in the 1920 civilian war honours. She was awarded the King's Police and Fire Services Medal (KPFSM) in the 1944 Birthday Honours.

After her death her memoirs were published by the Metropolitan Police. These memoirs are actually more a description of the development of the force rather than Peto's personal memoirs of her particular role or life.

== Notes ==
Police appointments
Preceded by First incumbent (Bertha Clayden was Inspector)	Staff Officer, Women's Section, Metropolitan Police; 1930–1932	Succeeded by Last incumbent
Preceded by First incumbent	Commander, A4 Branch (Women Police), Metropolitan Police; 1932–1946	Succeeded by Elizabeth Bather
