= Port of Bristol Police =

British police force

- Logo of the Port of Bristol Police

Agency overview
- Formed: 1803
- Employees: 31

Jurisdictional structure
- Operations jurisdiction: England, England
- Legal jurisdiction: Port of Bristol & 1 mile from the boundary and any specific Port Police business thereafter
- Constituting instrument: Harbours, Docks and Piers Clauses Act 1847
- General nature: Local civilian police

Operational structure
- Headquarters: Royal Portbury Dock, Avon, Bristol BS20 7XQ
- Port Police Constables: 31

Facilities
- Stations: 1

Website
- Official Website Page

The Port of Bristol Police (PoBP) is a ports police force with responsibility to protect the port complexes and community situated at the mouth of the River Avon on the border between Bristol and Somerset. Officers are attested under powers in legislation derived from the Harbours, Docks and Piers Clauses Act 1847.

The PoBP has existed at the Avonmouth Docks since 1884, but has been in its present form since the end of the Second World War. The PoBP in modern times is responsible for the policing and certain security measures at Avonmouth Docks, Royal Portbury Dock and the trading estates owned by The Bristol Port Company that are situated at the outskirts of the port areas.

First Corporate Shipping Limited, trading as The Bristol Port Company, is the statutory undertaker (within the meaning of the Police and Criminal Evidence Act 1984) of the harbour area and is solely responsible for financing and employing the PoBP.

== History ==
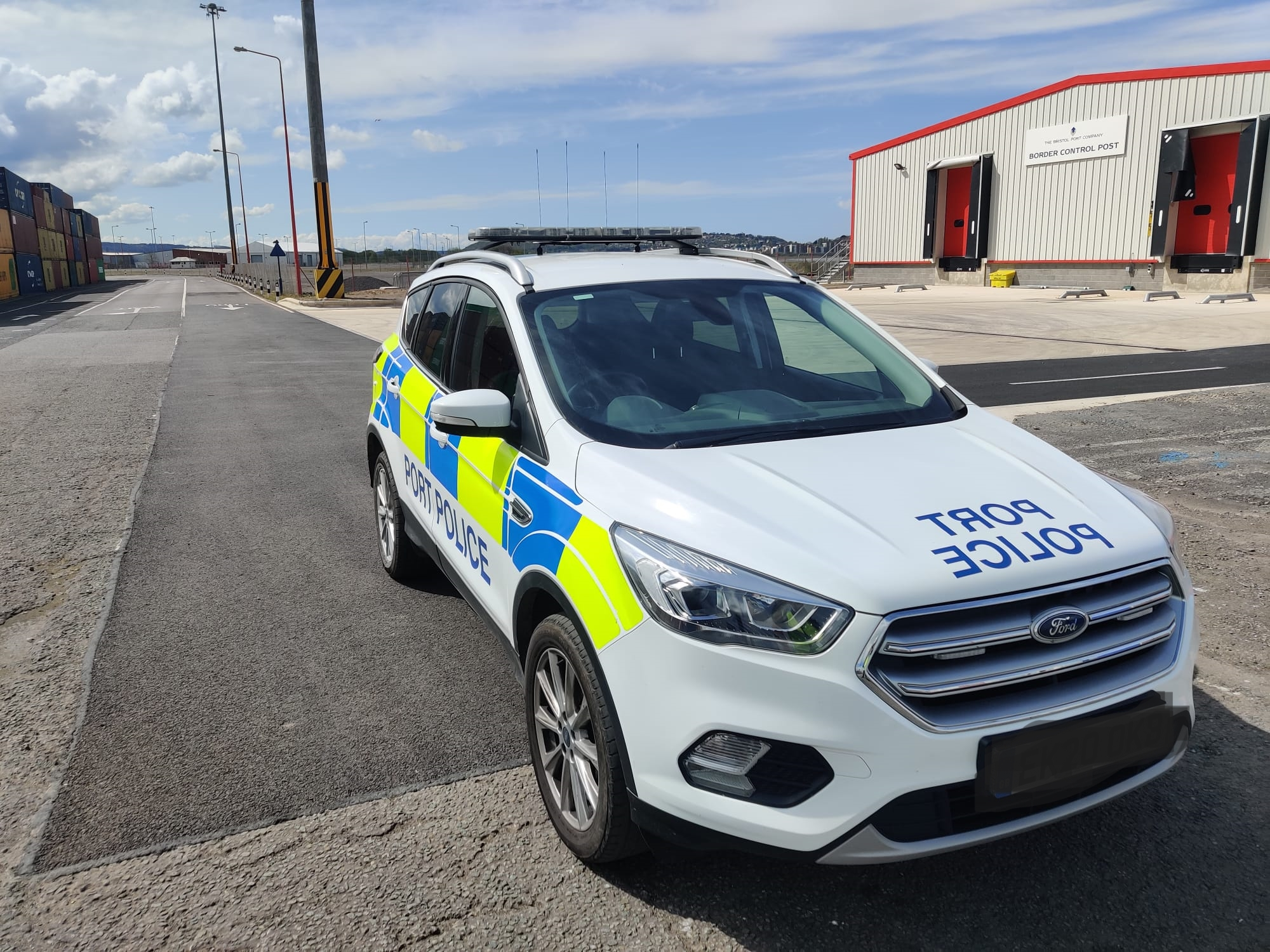
A Port of Bristol Police car, a Ford Kuga, used for patrol work. Note, although the vehicle has the UK "battenburg" livery, there are no logos, numbers or wording, apart from "POLICE" or "PORT POLICE" on the four sides.

The Port of Bristol Police started as The Bristol Docks Company in 1803. The Bristol Docks Act 1803 created the company and provided for the improvement of the Port and Harbour of Bristol. A force of 51 men was duly appointed as constables under this act and were stationed in a police office building at Wapping Wharf, adjacent to the Bristol Dock Company office at Underfall Yard, Bristol City Docks.

In 1848 the Bristol Dock Company was taken into the ownership of Bristol City Council and began trading as the Port of Bristol Authority. It was then deemed unnecessary by the new authority to continue with the inherited police force, as Bristol had by then in 1842 formed a River Police section of the Bristol Constabulary. In 1877 the Bristol and Portishead Pier and Railway Company formed a small police force at Portishead Dock composed of a sergeant and six constables. A force of similar size was also formed by the Bristol Port and Channel Dock Company at Avonmouth in 1878. These two dock companies were subsequently acquired by the Port of Bristol Authority in 1884 and the present Port of Bristol Police Force were then reformed from its beginnings in 1803.

== Structure ==
The chief officer of the port police is usually an inspector or chief inspector and an experienced former territorial police officer. The chief officer is also the port facility security officer, under the International Ship and Port Facility Security Code.

In 2025, the structure was as follows:

Port of Bristol Police rank structure
Rank	Constable	Sergeant	Inspector	Chief Inspector	Police Support Officer
Insignia	PC Epaulette	PS Epaulette		CInsp	
Number of personnel at this rank	25	2	1	1	6

== Powers and Authority ==
=== Original Legislation ===
Officers of port police forces are sworn in as "special constables" under section 79 of the Harbours, Docks and Piers Clauses Act 1847, as a result, officers have the full powers of a constable on any land owned by the harbour, dock, or port and at any place within one mile of any owned land. (The act uses the term 'special constable'; at the time this act was passed 'special constable' meant any constable who was not a member of a territorial police force).

=== Additional Powers ===
The Marine Navigation Act 2013 has potentially enabled ports constables in England & Wales to act as constables beyond this one mile limit, in relation to policing purposes connected with the port only, in a police area where consent has been obtained from the relevant chief constable. This act does not however give general police powers to ports constables, beyond their core jurisdiction as set out in the 1847 act, merely in relation to policing purposes connected to the port as set out in the Act.

As of 2014, three ports police forces (Dover, Teesport and Bristol) have sought and received consent from the local chief constable. This has enabled PoB Police Constables, in relation to policing purposes connected to the port, to act as such, throughout the police area in which they are geographically located. Serious or major incidents or crime generally become the responsibility of territorial police force; Avon and Somerset Constabulary.

== Multi-agency approach ==
Whenever possible, the port police adopt a multi-agency approach to dealing with border control and other issues arising in the port area. Whilst not adopting the role of the Border Force, Driver and Vehicle Standards Agency or any other agency, the port police often act on their behalf when dealing with offenders.

== Port police support officer ==
The PoB also has police support officers, who are not constables, but provide non-warranted uniform support to the Port Police. Their uniform is similar to Home Office PCSOs.

== Facilities and Equipment ==
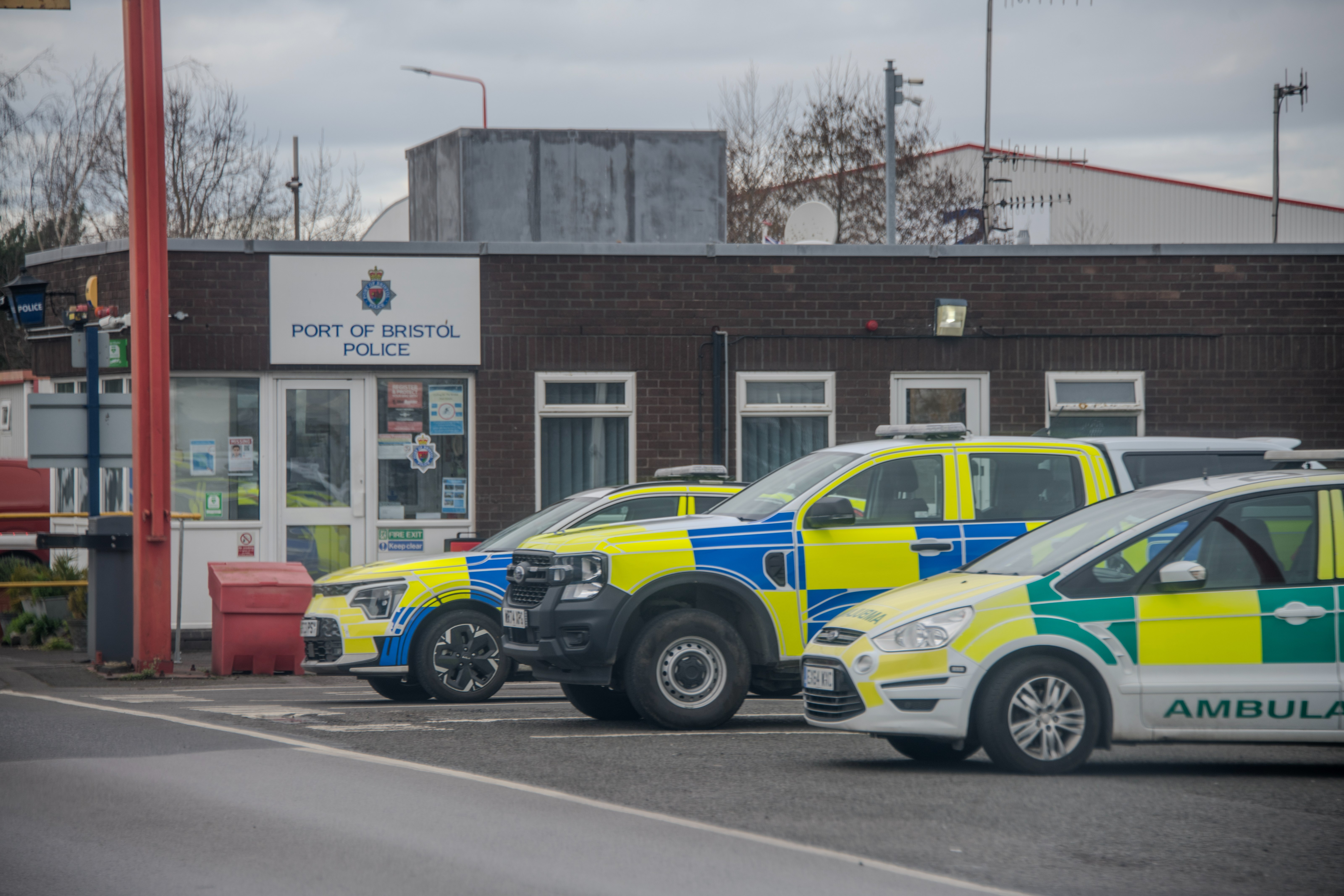
Royal Portbury Dock - Port of Bristol Police station and vehicles

The PoB Police has police vehicles, to patrol and travel around the area. They have a police station at the Royal Portbury Dock, where officers are based and vehicles are parked.

=== Uniform ===
PoB Police officers wear a uniform to be recognisable around the Port.

In 2021 this included:

- White shirt & black tie
- Black trousers
- High visibility equipment vest
- Black kit belt
- A variety of headgear, including Custodian helmets, safety "bump-caps" and peaked caps.

=== Personal Protective Equipment ===
Officers carried PAVA spray, batons and handcuffs.

== See also ==
- Law enforcement in the United Kingdom
- List of law enforcement agencies in the United Kingdom, Crown Dependencies and British Overseas Territories
- Ports Police in the United Kingdom
