= Elizabeth Bather =

British police officer

Chief Superintendent Elizabeth Bather OBE

Head of A4 Branch (Women Police), Metropolitan Police
- In office December 1946 – December 1960

Personal details
- Born: Elizabeth Constance Bather; 11 October 1904 Winchester, Hampshire, England
- Died: 8 January 1988 (aged 83) Nately Scures, Hampshire, England

Elizabeth Constance Bather OBE (11 October 1904 – 8 January 1988) was a British Women's Auxiliary Air Force and police officer who served as the second commander of the London Metropolitan Police's A4 Branch (Women Police), from 1946 to 1960 and was the first female police officer in the United Kingdom to be promoted to chief superintendent when the rank was introduced into the Metropolitan Police in 1949.

== Family and early life ==
Bather was born in Winchester, the second of two children born to Shropshire-born Arthur George Bather and Sheffield-born mother Lilian Dundas Firth, who had married in August 1895, a steel-manufacturer's daughter, and their only daughter. Arthur was a housemaster at Winchester College at the time of Elizabeth's birth, hence her birthplace. He was also a Church of England priest, a cricketer for Hampshire and an archaeologist of ancient Greece.

She was educated at St Swithun's School in the city. On 14 January 1928, she was fined £3 with 30 shillings costs for dangerous driving after a collision with a motorcyclist at West End. From 1937 to 1946 she was a magistrate in Winchester, one of the youngest in the country, and also a member of Hampshire County Council.

== WAAF career ==
On 5 April 1939, she joined the Women's Auxiliary Air Force (WAAF) with the rank of company assistant (equivalent to pilot officer in the RAF, the lowest commissioned officer rank) and was already living at RAF Odiham by the time of the 1939 Register that September. She served in Bomber Command, rising to be senior staff officer in charge of WAAFs, and also went to Canada in 1941 to help set up the Canadian Women's Auxiliary Air Force. She was promoted squadron officer in March 1942 and wing officer in January 1945 and was appointed Officer of the Order of the British Empire (OBE) in the 1946 New Year Honours.

== Police career ==
In 1945, Bather joined the Metropolitan Police with the rank of chief inspector and the following year succeeded Superintendent Dorothy Peto as head of women police, being promoted to superintendent herself. At 5 feet 4 inches, she only barely met the minimum height standard for the force. As head of A4 (Women's) Branch, her immediate superior was the Assistant Commissioner "A".

Bather attempted to "feminise" the female officers, redesigning the uniform in 1946 and allowing policewomen to wear makeup on duty. In 1946 she also removed the bar to married women joining and serving policewomen getting married which had been in force since the 1920s. She gave evidence to the Wolfenden Committee in favour of decriminalising homosexuality. She died in Nately Scures and is buried at Odiham.

== Bibliography ==
- Biography, Oxford Dictionary of National Biography
- Biography, Who Was Who

Police appointments
Preceded by Dorothy Peto	Commander, A4 Branch (Women Police), Metropolitan Police; 1946–1960	Succeeded by Winifred Barker
