= Janasaviya =

Sri Lankan poverty alleviation program

Janasaviya was a poverty reduction program in Sri Lanka. It was introduced in 1989 by the government of Ranasinghe Premadasa, and was a lead program of his government. In 1995, under the new president Chandrika Kumaratunga, it was replaced by the Samurdhi program.

== See also ==
- Welfare in Sri Lanka
