= Divisional detective inspector =

Divisional detective inspector (DDI), also known as first class detective inspector, was a rank in the Criminal Investigation Department of London's Metropolitan Police, equivalent to sub-divisional inspector in the uniformed branch. It was senior to the rank of detective inspector (officially called second class detective inspector) and junior to the rank of detective chief inspector.

In the late 19th century, divisional detective inspectors were appointed to local police forces for the first time.

The DDI was in charge of the CID in each police division. He was usually assisted by one or two detective inspectors, a first class detective sergeant, and a number of detective sergeants and detective constables. He was largely autonomous on his "patch", answering only to the divisional superintendent and only calling in support from Scotland Yard for very serious crimes such as murder. DDI was an important stepping stone in a detective's career, with many top detectives getting their best experience when they were DDIs.

The rank was discontinued in 1949, when it was regraded to detective chief inspector. In 1953, it was regraded again to detective superintendent grade I, and is thus equivalent to a modern detective superintendent.
