= Port of Dover Police =

Port police in Dover, Kent, England

- Badge of the Port of Dover Police
- Abbreviation: PoDP
- Motto: "Serving the Port Community" and "Delivering Safety and Security to our Customers"

Agency overview
- Formed: 1933

Jurisdictional structure
- Operations jurisdiction: Dover Harbour Board, England, UK
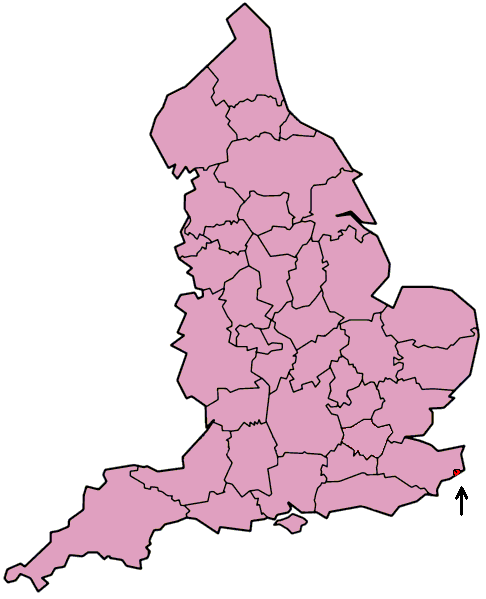
- Location of Port of Dover
- Area: 8 km^{2}
- Population: Nil - (16 million passengers per year + port staff)
- Legal jurisdiction: Land & Property belonging to Dover Harbour Board and up to 1-mile (1.6 km) from same
- Governing body: Dover Harbour Board
- Constituting instrument: Dover Harbour Consolidation Act 1954
- General nature: Civilian police

Operational structure
- Headquarters: Floor 4, Terminal Control Building, Eastern Docks, Dover. CT16 1JA.
- Constables: 37
- Civilians: 1 (+ Port support staff)
- Agency executive: Richard Smeed, Chief Inspector (Head of Policing)

Facilities
- Stations: 1
- Boats: 1

Website
- Website

The Port of Dover Police (PoDP) is a non-Home Office ports police force which provides a 24-hour policing service to the Port of Dover, Kent, England.

== Organisation and role ==
The PoDP is established, funded and maintained by the owners of the Port of Dover, the Dover Harbour Board, the statutory undertakers.

The force is maintained under the Dover Harbour Consolidation Act 1954 (2 & 3 Eliz. 2. c. iv), which incorporates section 79 of the Harbours, Docks, and Piers Clauses Act 1847 (10 & 11 Vict. c. 27). Section 79 provides that the Dover Harbour Board may nominate people to be special constables, who are then sworn in by a justice of the peace. Such constables have, by virtue of the 1847 act, jurisdiction on land owned by the harbour board and anywhere within a one-mile radius of such land. The force was established in 1933.

In purely legal terms, the DHB owns significant areas of land on the sea front of Dover together with the ferry and cruise terminals. The authority also owns land in an area known as 'Port Zone' in the Whitfield area to the north of the town. Combined, this land ownership effectively gives the PoDP jurisdiction throughout the whole town of Dover, but in practical terms the policing activities of the PoDP are directed at the Eastern and Western Dock Terminals and the public promenade located between the two terminals.

=== Custody and arrests ===
As the PoDP does not have its own custody facilities, the practice had been that people who had been arrested were taken to Kent Police's Dover police station. However, when the custody suite there closed in November 2011, PoDP officers would have instead been required to take arrestees to Canterbury, Folkestone or Margate police stations, but the force received a legal opinion stating that this would be unlawful as this would put them outside the one mile limit of their jurisdiction. A short term measure had to be introduced whereby suspects were arrested by officers from Kent Police and transport them to a suitable police station on behalf of PoDP. This problem was resolved when the Marine Navigation Act 2013 (c. 23) was introduced in early 2014, allowing the jurisdiction of port police officers to extend to the police area in which they are located where the chief officer of the local police force consents (in relation to port policing matters only).

=== Police Area ===
The area policed by the PoDP is not a separate police area, and as a result primary responsibility for the maintenance and enforcement of criminal law throughout the county of Kent including the Port of Dover rests with the chief constable of Kent Police. Kent Police and PoDP have a long history of working together in relation to the port and its immediate surroundings.

== Memorandum of understanding ==
A memorandum of understanding (MOU) between PoDP and Kent Police sets out each organisation's responsibilities, and that ultimately the responsibility for the investigation of criminal offences committed within the port and other DHB properties rests with Kent Police.

However the PoDP investigates all criminal offences within the port except those deemed as serious or that are beyond the capability or capacity of its limited size. Serious offences committed within the port, such as acts of terrorism, murder, manslaughter, rape, facilitation of illegal immigration or any incident involving the death (suspicious or not) of a person are investigated by Kent Police. However, PoDP officers will take immediate necessary action prior to the arrival of Kent Police officers in such cases. Kent Police assist PoDP with crimes that they do investigate by providing such services as forensic officers, specialist support units and custody office facilities, the PoDP not having its own custody suite.

Whilst national arrangements exist between territorial police forces for mutual aid policing, these do not apply between a territorial and non-Home Office forces such as PoDP. However, the PoDP will, when resources and legal jurisdiction permit, respond to calls for assistance from Kent Police in the Dover area.

== Staffing ==
As of December 2021, there are 38 members of staff, made up of:

- 1 Chief Inspector
- 1 Inspector
- 4 Sergeants
- 30 Constables (including 5 part-time officers)
- 1 Detective Constable
- 1 civilian police administrator

The current head of policing is Chief Inspector Richard Smeed.

Until 2018 the force also employed seven civilian communications officers, but general civilian support is now provided by assorted Port of Dover employees.

=== Staffing areas ===
The majority of officers perform uniformed mobile and foot patrols incorporating a neighbourhood policing unit. The force also has a small criminal investigation department staffed by one detective constable. CID officers attend detective training courses at Kent Police training school. One constable is employed as a training officer for both initial and in-service training, and the force provides all initial training not only for its own officers and staff, but also for the Port of Bristol Police and the Port of Felixstowe Police.

The Port of Dover operates 24 hours a day seven days a week which sees over 16.5 million passengers pass through it each year; this combined with huge volumes of cars, lorries and coaches, makes it the busiest ferry port in Europe. The port also handles an ever-increasing number of cargo ships, cruise ships and a large number of leisure craft at the marina. These statistics result in a very high level of daily interaction with the public which makes PoDP unusual compared with other port police forces. During 2009 officers of PoDP made over 700 arrests for a wide variety of offences including drink-driving, theft, fraud and public order. Hundreds of other traffic and crime offences were dealt with by way of reporting for summons, or by the issue of graduated fixed penalty notices (this is for where an address is not suitable for summons and Port of Dover officers have been authorised by Kent Police to issue these notices).

Non-police staff are employed alongside police officers, particularly in the staffing of the control room and CCTV cameras which were formerly based in the operational police station just inside the main entrance to the Eastern Docks. The operational police station is now closed and no longer used by the force. There is no longer a headquarters building and all officers are now based in the Terminal Control Building.

== Ranks ==
The rank structure of the Port of Dover Police is as shown below. Since 2017 the rank of Superintendent has been unused. The former senior management (of two Inspectors and one Superintendent) has been replaced since that time by a single Inspector and later by a Chief Inspector.

Ranks of the Port of Dover Police
| Rank | Chief inspector | Inspector | Sergeant | Constable |
| Insignia | | | | |

== Facilities and equipment ==
Officers wear identical uniforms to their colleagues in other forces throughout the country, including the familiar helmet of British police constables. This includes a 'formal' and a 'working' uniform.

They also wear peaked flat caps with a Sillitoe tartan band, stab-resistant vests, carry asp extendable batons, rigid handcuffs and PAVA incapacitant spray. They are also equipped with encrypted personal radios and BWC (Body Worn Cameras). The force operates a small fleet of marked and unmarked police vehicles. All police drivers undergo the standard police driving course. There is also a marine capability with Delta99, a rigid inflatable boat (Rib), which not only provides security within the docks and cruise ship terminals, but is also used to good effect in combating marine crime in the marina, the inner harbour, and surrounding areas of the port. The boat also provides assistance to small craft and has been utilised in the recovery of property and bodies from the sea, the foreshore, and the inaccessible areas below the white cliffs that stretch east and west of the port.

== In the media ==
The Port of Dover Police have been shown in several television shows, including:

- BBC's Maximum Security
- Channel 4's Dover 24/7 - Britain's Busiest Port - it has two series and the Port Police are shown on patrol and dealing with incidents.
