= Winifred Barker =

English police officer

Chief Superintendent Winifred Barker QPM CPM

Head of A4 Branch (Women Police), Metropolitan Police
- In office December 1960 – 25 May 1966

Personal details
- Born: Winifred Theodora Barker; 2 October 1910; Tisbury, Wiltshire, England
- Died: 8 May 1995 (aged 84); Brockworth, Gloucestershire, England
- Education: Chelsea College of Physical Education
- Occupation: Police officer

Winifred Theodora Barker (2 October 1910 – 8 May 1995) was an English police officer. She was the third commander of A4 Branch (Women Police) in the London Metropolitan Police, from 1960 to 1966, and the second woman in the United Kingdom to hold the rank of chief superintendent.

== Early life and education ==
Barker was born on 2 October 1910 in Tisbury, Wiltshire and attended Reading Abbey Girls' School until 1929. She later studied at Chelsea College of Physical Education and moved to New Zealand, where she taught physical education for seven years.

== Career ==
When World War II began, Barker returned to England and in 1941 began working as a woman police officer in Paddington. She worked a routine beat for twenty years. Between May 1957 and November 1958, having been promoted to superintendent, she commanded the British Police Cyprus Women's Unit, for which she was awarded the Colonial Police Medal (CPM) in the 1959 New Year Honours.

She was called back to London in 1959 to replace Sophie Alloway as the deputy commander of Scotland Yard's Women's Branch. In December 1960, after taking over command of the branch from Elizabeth Bather, she was promoted to the rank of chief superintendent. She was the first woman appointed to the role by rising through the police ranks. During her time in command, she gave presentations on the work of women police officers, which often revolved around child neglect, violence toward women, and women prisoners. Besides regularly visiting the stations to supervise women officers, Barker was responsible for increasing the number of women officers from 443 in 1961 to 465 by 1963. She was awarded the Queen's Police Medal (QPM) in the 1965 New Year Honours.

Barker retired on 25 May 1966, being succeeded by Shirley Becke, and moved to Somerset. She died in Brockworth, Gloucestershire, on 8 May 1995.

== Footnotes ==
Police appointments
| Preceded by Elizabeth Bather | Commander, A4 Branch (Women Police), Metropolitan Police; 1960–1966 | Succeeded by Shirley Becke |
