= Barbara Kelley =

British police officer (1920–1998)

Detective Chief Superintendent Barbara Kelley MBE
- Born: Barbara Lilian Kelley; 26 August 1920; Bridgwater, Somerset, England
- Died: 2 March 1998 (aged 77)
- Occupation: Police officer
- Known for: First female police officer in the United Kingdom to be promoted to detective chief superintendent.

Barbara Lilian Kelley MBE (26 August 1920 – 2 March 1998) was a British police officer with the London Metropolitan Police. She was the first woman in the country to be promoted to the rank of Detective Chief Superintendent.

Kelley was born in Bridgwater, Somerset. She enlisted in the Women's Auxiliary Air Force (WAAF) on 6 June 1940 and was discharged with the rank of Sergeant on 17 January 1946. She was mentioned in dispatches on 8 August 1944.

She joined the Metropolitan Police on 2 December 1946. In the late 1940s, she served as a Detective Constable at West End Central Police Station with Shirley Becke, later to become the first female Commander in the Metropolitan Police. The two officers persuaded their Divisional Detective Inspector to allow them to serve on all cases instead of the limited range of cases (mainly involving women and children) to which women detectives had previously been restricted. This paved the way to full integration of female detectives. By 1972 Kelley had reached the rank of Chief Superintendent and was serving in the Murder Squad at Scotland Yard.

Kelley was appointed Member of the Order of the British Empire (MBE) in the 1973 New Year Honours. She retired in August 1975.
