= Police Council =

The Police Council was a national United Kingdom body for discussing police pensions, pay and service conditions.

It was formed in 1920, with Dorothy Peto joining as its first female member in 1931. It was abolished in 1978, with its functions taken over two years later by the Police Negotiating Board.
