= Welfare in Sri Lanka =

Social welfare has long been an important part of Sri Lankan society and a significant political issue. It is concerned with the provision by the state of benefits and services. Social welfare is mostly funded through general taxation.

== Social welfare ==
=== Health care ===
Sri Lanka has had a universal health care system that is free for anyone using it, including both citizens and non-citizens, since 1951 when the government officially abolished all user fees at public medical institutions. It is publicly funded and run by Ministry of Health. This includes both dental care and community medicine. The country has over 550 hospitals.

==== Primary healthcare ====
Primary care is provided by 500+ local clinics, 330 Medical Officer of Health (MOH) offices that handle basic checkups, vaccinations, and preventive care such as midwife services and Public Health Inspector.

==== Secondary level ====
A network of district and base hospitals handle common illnesses and routine surgeries at District and Divisional level. Anyone can walk in to the Out-Patient Department (OPD) or an Emergency Unit for treatment.

==== Tertiary level ====
Larger cities at Provincal level have specialised, national and teaching hospitals that handle major surgeries and specialist care.

==== Dental care ====
Most healthcare facilities such as primary, secondary and tertiary levels have dental facilities that provide free routine and emergency dental services without point-of-use charges. National hospitals handle complex procedures such as maxillofacial surgeries and wisdom tooth extractions under anaesthesia at no cost. The Health Ministry manages over hundred School Dental Clinics across the island.

=== Social security ===
Social security benefits are administered by the Department of Social Services. As of 2022, they include:

- Aswesuma Allowance - for transitional, vulnerable, poor, and extremely poor families.
- Samurdhi Allowance - for low income families.
- Pregnant Mother's Allowance
- Elderly, Disabled, and Kidney Aatients Allowance

== State housing and land ==
The government provides State housing and land to those in need.

The government has provided subsidised lands, housing projects (Nila Piyasa, Nila Sevana) and concessionary housing loans for state sector employees.

== Education ==
Primary and secondary education is free in Sri Lanka since 1 October 1945 when C.W.W. Kannangara brought into effect the policy of free education. It is the responsibility of the Ministry of Education and the Provincial Governments. Undergraduate education in state universities are free, but limited to less than 10% of the student population.

=== Free school uniforms ===
In 1991, the government under President Ranasinghe Premadasa introduced a program to provide free uniforms for school children. This has later expanded to include vouchers for school shoes.

=== Mahapola Scholarship ===
The Mahapola Scholarship Scheme was established in 1981 by Trade Minister Lalith Athulathmudali to provide financial assistance to unprivileged youth for higher education.

== Pensions ==
=== Government pensions ===
State sector, some state owned and private sector organizations provides pensions for employees who retire at that ages between 55 and 62 years, having complete a number of years of service (e.g. 30 years). Pensions are granted after lesser terms of service for certain groups such as member of parliaments (5 years) and military personnel (10 years).

=== Superannuation ===
Private provident funds existed in the private sector, with some companies contributing on a voluntary basis until 1958, when the Employees' Provident Fund was established by S. W. R. D. Bandaranaike following the enactment of the Employees' Provident Fund Act No 15 of 1958 which established the Employees' Provident Fund which made it compulsory for all employers and employees to contribute if not employed in a pensionable role. This was further supplemented by the Employees' Trust Fund in 1981.

== Paid parental leave ==
Per the Shop and Office Employees (Regulation of Employment and Remuneration) Act, females are entitled for paid maternity leave in both the state and private sector with the employer responsible for payment of their wages during the period of leave. In addition, mothers are allowed a daily time allowance to feed babies until they reach one year of age.

== Food welfare ==
=== Rice ration scheme ===
During World War II the Government of Ceylon introduced a rice ration scheme as a food subsidy to control price inflation issued on ration cards. This scheme provided a universal weekly quota of free rice to all citizens. It was continued after the war ended in 1945 and Ceylon gained self-rule in 1948, as a means of cost-of-living control by heavily subsidized this staple grain. As the years progressed the program became a major strain for the government finances until it was replaced in 1979 by food stamps. Attempts to stop the program earlier in 1953 due to the government's financial position, since Ceylon at the time imported a major portion of its rice, lead to the 1953 Ceylonese hartal.

=== Free school meals ===
The early school feeding programs started in 1931 by the colonial government, which evolved into a formal mid-day meal after independence. In 1956 the School Biscuit Program was initiated to introduce a fortified biscuit for school children with assistance from USAid. This was expanded to a mid-day meal of a bun introduced by the Minister of Education Wijeyananda Dahanayake who became known as "Banis Mama" (Bun Uncle). These programs alternated between buns, glasses of milk, fortified biscuits, and cooked rice-based meals depending on state budgets and foreign aid partners like the World Food Programme (WFP).
