= Sub-divisional inspector =

Rank used in the London Metropolitan Police

Sub-divisional inspector was a rank used in the London Metropolitan Police from the 1870s or 1880s until 1949. A sub-divisional inspector ranked above an inspector and below a chief inspector. As the title suggests, he or she commanded a sub-division or held an equivalent administrative position. The equivalent rank in the Criminal Investigation Department was divisional detective inspector or first class detective inspector. In 1949, the rank was absorbed into that of chief inspector, although in 1953 officers who held the position of sub-divisional commander were regraded again to superintendent grade I, and are thus equivalent to modern superintendents.

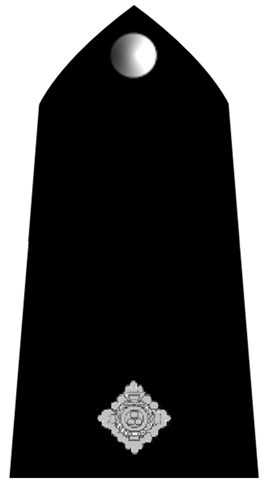
1880–1922

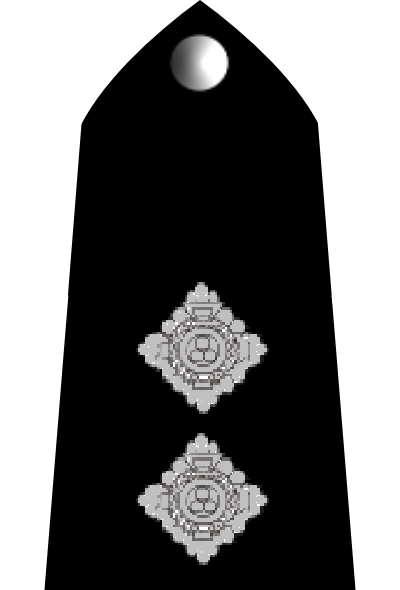
1922–1941

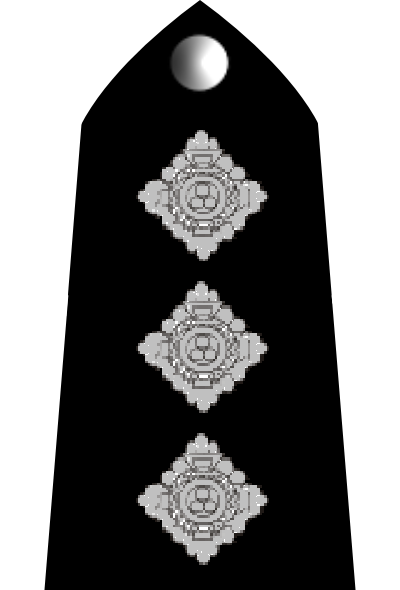
1941–1949

Rank insignia 1880–1949

Rank was indicated by a number of diamond-shaped Bath Stars (or "pips") that were worn on either the standing collar or the epaulettes. A single star was worn from 1880 to 1922, two stars from 1922 to 1941, and three stars from 1941 to 1949.

Lilian Wyles was promoted to the rank in 1929 and Bertha Clayden in 1934.
