= Police division =

Largest territorial subdivision of most British police forces

A division was the usual term for the largest territorial subdivision of most British police forces. In major reforms of police organisation in the 1990s divisions of many forces were restructured and retitled Basic Command Units (BCUs), although as of 2009 some forces continue to refer to them as divisions.

The term was and is used in many other countries of the British Empire and Commonwealth.

== United Kingdom ==
The term has existed since the creation of police forces in the early 19th century. Most police forces were divided into divisions, usually commanded by a Superintendent. Divisions were usually divided into Sub-Divisions, commanded by Inspectors (or, in the Metropolitan Police, Sub-Divisional Inspectors, a higher rank). Some rural forces did not acquire this further organisational level until well into the 20th century, however. Sub-divisional commanders were later regraded as Chief Inspectors in most forces. In London, divisions were later grouped together as districts, each commanded by a Chief Constable and later a Deputy Assistant Commissioner.

Each division could cover a wide rural area, a substantial town, or a portion of a city, depending on the population (London, for instance, was divided at one point into 67 Metropolitan Police divisions and sub-divisions and a further four City of London Police divisions). In 1949, the Metropolitan Police regraded its divisional commanders as Chief Superintendents and most other forces followed suit. With the reforms of the 1990s, sub-divisions and divisions acquired a variety of new names – for instance, in 1999 the Metropolitan Police replaced its divisions with "Borough Policing", whose boundaries were based on the 1965 London boroughs.

=== Metropolitan Police divisions, 1829–1999 ===
1829

- A (Whitehall)
- B (Westminster (Note: Later known as Chelsea))
- C (St James's)
- D (Marylebone)
- E (Holborn)
- F (Covent Garden (Note: Abolished c.1869))
- G (Finsbury)
- H (Whitechapel)
- K (Stepney (Note: Later known as Bow))
- L (Lambeth)
- M (Southwark)
- N (Islington)
- P (Camberwell)
- R (Greenwich)
- S (Hampstead)
- T (Kensington (Note: Later known as Hammersmith))
- V (Wandsworth)

Later additions by formation date

- W (Clapham) (1865)
- X (Willesden) (1865)
- Y (Highgate (Note: Later Tottenham)) (1865)
- J (Bethnal Green (Note: Later known as Hackney)) (1886)
- F (Paddington) (1886)
- Z (Croydon) (1921)
- Q (Kilburn) (1965)
- I (Heathrow) (1984 (Note: Abolished 1986))

== Hong Kong ==
The Hong Kong Police Force divides its territory into 23 divisions or districts, each reporting to one of the six regions.

== India ==
In India, the equivalent to a division is a police district. Policing in India is on a state basis, and every state is divided into a number of districts. These districts are grouped into police ranges, which in turn are organised under police zones. Each district is headed by a superintendent of police. The district is subdivided into sub-divisions, each commanded by a deputy superintendent of police. Sub-divisions are further divided into police circles. In the case of a district including large cities, two separate police districts are created, known as the city police district, headed by a commissioner of police, and the rural district police, headed by a superintendent of police.

== Ireland ==
In Ireland, the Garda Síochána divides its operational area into 26 divisions, which in turn report to one of four regions. Most, but not all of these divisions, are aligned to county borders. Each division is commanded by a Chief Superintendent. Divisions are further divided into districts, commanded by a Superintendent.

== Singapore ==
The Singapore Police Force divides the city-state into seven divisions of varying physical sizes and population. These boundaries tend to be demarcated in terms of cases handled by observing criminal trends over time, instead of being based on area or population sizes alone.

== Canada ==
A few police departments in Canada use divisions to represent stations or patrol areas, but some are a mix of operational and administrative units with the force.

A few police agencies using divisions include:

- Peel Regional Police - 5 (4 geographic and 1 operational)
- Ottawa Police Service - 3 (geographic)
- Edmonton Police Service - 5 (geographic)
- Halifax Regional Police - 4 (3 geographic and 1 operational)
- Hamilton Police Service - 3 (geographic)
- Toronto Police Service - 17 (geographic)
- Vancouver Police Department - 3 (operational)
- Victoria Police Department - 6 (operational and administrative)
- Waterloo Regional Police Service - 5 (geographic)
- Winnipeg Police Service - 5 (geographic)
