= Public Health Inspector (Sri Lanka) =

In Sri Lanka, the Public Health Inspector (PHI) profession started in 1913. The PHI plays a crucial role in the public health sector for over a hundred years. The officers work as Range PHIs under the Ministry of Health, Provincial Ministries of Health, Ministry of Local Governments. They also perform duties in the National Hospital of Sri Lanka, Teaching Hospitals, Provincial/District General Hospitals, Specialized Hospitals, Specialised Campaigns, Blood Banks, Medical Research Institute, Seaport and Airport, Department of Prison, three Armed Forces Hospitals and Government Universities. They are entitled to a special uniform.

Major areas of responsibilities are Among the primary duties of PHIs is environmental management with health, investigation and control of communicable diseases, maintenance of occupational health, school health including immunisation, food safety, control of non-communicable diseases, supporting of management of health activities during disasters, health education and health promotion and enforcement of public health law.

Only males are recruited for this service. Trainee PHIs will undergo training for 2 years at the school of Public Health Inspectors (PHI) at National Institute of Health Sciences – Kalutara and 5 Regional Health Training Centres in Kadugannawa, Kurunegala, Galle, Batticaloa, and Jaffna. The medium of instruction is English. Following successful completion, "Higher Diploma for Public Health Inspectors" will be awarded and be appointed to PHI areas.

They have an opportunity to expand their career through grade promotions as Divisional, District, Provincial Supervising Public Health Inspectors, Principal Public Health Inspector in the Ministry of Health, Tutors, Senior Tutors, and Principals in training schools. They also have opportunities to promote to Health Education Officers, Food and Drugs Inspectors and other open promotions in the government sector. They can follow degree programs in health promotion conducted by state sector universities with paid leave from the Ministry of Health.

== Minimum entry qualifications ==
- GCE (O/L) - Should have passed six subjects including English Language with Credit Passes for Sinhala Language / Tamil Language, Mathematics, Science and any other subject in not more than two sittings, at the G.C.E. (O/L) examination.
- GCE (A/L) - Should have a Credit pass to Combined mathematics or Biology & passed 2 subjects from Chemistry, Physics, Agriculture in one sitting at the G.C.E. A/L Examination.
- Only males with a height more than 5 feet and 2 inches (>157.46 cm) can apply.

== Ranks ==
- Principal Public Health Inspector
- Supervising Public Health Inspector Provincial
- Supervising Public Health Inspector District
- Supervising Public Health Inspector Divisional
- Public Health Inspector Class I
- Public Health Inspector Class II
- Public Health Inspector Class III

== See also ==
- Environmental health officer
