= Chief inspector =

Police force rank

Chief inspector (Ch Insp) is a rank used in police forces which follow the British model. In countries outside Britain, it is sometimes referred to as chief inspector of police (CIP).

== Usage by country ==
=== Australia ===
The rank of chief inspector is used in the New South Wales Police and South Australia Police. Victoria Police declassified the rank in the mid-1990s. In both forces, it is senior to the rank of inspector and junior to the rank of superintendent. The insignia consists of a crown, the same insignia as that of a Major in the army.

=== Canada ===
The Sûreté du Québec and the City of Montreal Police Service (Service de police de la Ville de Montréal or SPVM) utilize the rank of chief inspector. In both forces, the insignia consists of four gold stripes, similar to the former insignia of a colonel in the Canadian Army and Air Force. Until 1978, the SPVM used British-pattern insignia for the rank consisting of a crown over two pips, also utilizing the rank of assistant chief inspector (a crown over one pip). Both ranks were subsequently abolished. The rank of chief inspector was restored in the SPVM in 1995 and the current insignia adopted in 1997.

=== Hong Kong ===
In the Hong Kong Police Force, a chief inspector is normally the second-in-command of a headquarters unit or a division.

=== Japan ===
In the Japanese National Police Agency, a chief inspector (keibu) serves as the squad commander in a police station and leader of a riot company. Prior to a 2013 restructuring that changed the English translation slightly, this rank was that of inspector.

=== Papua New Guinea ===
In the Royal Papua New Guinea Constabulary, a chief inspector is normally a police station commander or the second-in-command of the Police Training College. It is a rank between senior inspector and superintendent.

=== Philippines ===
In the Philippines, chief inspector is a rank in the Bureau of Jail Management and Penology and the Bureau of Fire Protection. It is above senior inspector and below superintendent and is regarded as the equivalent of major in the Philippine Army.

=== Romania ===
In the Romanian Police, inspector principal is a rank senior to inspector and junior to Subcomisar and corresponds to the former rank of police captain.

=== Singapore ===
The rank has been abolished by the Singapore Police Force, except for the Gurkha Contingent.

=== Sri Lanka ===
In the Sri Lanka Police Service, chief inspector of Police (CIP) is senior to inspector and junior to assistant superintendent of police. In large cities, a chief inspector is the officer in charge (OIC) of a large police station. The rank insignia for a chief inspector is three stars.

=== United Kingdom ===
UK police chief inspector epaulette

In the British police, a chief inspector is senior to an inspector and junior to a superintendent.

Today, the function of chief inspectors varies from force to force. They may assist Basic Command Unit (BCU) commanders, command smaller units, or fill various staff posts. In some forces such as Hampshire and Isle of Wight Constabulary and Sussex Police, the chief inspector is the senior officer in command of a district (usually consisting of one or more local authority areas). In this respect they have replaced superintendents as the head police officer of larger towns.

Detective chief inspector (DCI) is usually the minimum rank held by a senior investigating officer (SIO), who heads major investigations (e.g. murder), and a pool of these officers usually works out of force headquarters or major police stations. The senior Criminal Investigation Department (CID) officer in each BCU usually also holds this rank.

The rank badge of a chief inspector is three Bath stars ("pips") worn on the epaulettes. This is the same badge as a captain in the British Army. Until 1953, chief inspectors in the Metropolitan Police wore a crown on their epaulettes instead.

Chief inspector was one of the ranks proposed for abolition in the 1994 Sheehy Report, but in the end it was retained.

A number of city and burgh police forces in Scotland used the rank of lieutenant until 1948, when it was replaced by chief inspector.

==== Metropolitan Police ====
The rank was introduced into the Metropolitan Police in 1868 and was first used by Adolphus Williamson, the first head of the Detective Branch (later the Criminal Investigation Department). When Williamson was promoted to superintendent shortly afterwards, three of his inspectors were promoted to chief inspector and the rank was firmly established. In 1869 it was also introduced as a uniformed rank, with the senior assistant to the divisional superintendent being given the rank. The rank subsequently spread to other police forces.

From 1933, every Metropolitan Police division had two chief inspectors: chief inspector (administration) and chief inspector (crime) (the latter also being a uniformed administrative officer and not replacing the divisional detective inspector (DDI)). From 1949, sub-divisional inspectors and DDIs were regraded as chief inspectors and current chief inspectors were regraded as superintendents. From 1953, chief inspectors commanding sub-divisions and detective chief inspectors commanding divisional CIDs were regraded as superintendents grade I, other chief inspectors were regraded as superintendents grade II, and a redefined rank of chief inspector was created for senior inspectors. Since 1974, the Metropolitan Police has only had one rank of superintendent, in common with the rest of the country.

From January 1954, there was one superintendent grade I and one chief inspector in each sub-division, and one chief superintendent, one superintendent grade II and one detective superintendent grade I in each division. A detective chief inspector was added in each division later in 1954.

It was announced in October 2016 that the rank (along with the rank of commander) would be phased out of the Metropolitan Police Service by October 2018; however, this plan was later cancelled.

== Famous fictional characters ==
- DCI John Luther of the TV series Luther
- DCI George Gently of the TV series Inspector George Gently
- DCI Tom Mathias of the TV series Hinterland - Y Gwyll
- DCI Claud Eustace Teal, in the novels and adaptations of Leslie Charteris' Saint series
- DCI Reginald Wexford, in the eponymous series of novels by Ruth Rendell.
- Chief Inspector Derek Conway of the TV series The Bill
- Chief Inspector Eric Finch, head of New Scotland Yard and Minister of Investigations in the V for Vendetta graphic novel
- DCI Endeavour Morse of the Colin Dexter novels and the Inspector Morse television series
- DCIs Tom Barnaby and John Barnaby of the Caroline Graham novels and the Midsomer Murders television series
- DCI Gene Hunt of the television series Life on Mars (set in 1973) and Ashes to Ashes (set between 1981 and 1983)
- DCI Sam Tyler of Life on Mars (although when he awakes in 1973 he is a DI, in 2006 he holds the rank of DCI)
- DCI (later Detective Superintendent) Jane Tennison of the Prime Suspect television series
- DCI Adam Dalgliesh of Cover Her Face by P.D. James (later Superintendent, Chief Superintendent, Commander)
- DCI (originally Inspector) James Japp of the Agatha Christie Hercule Poirot novels and the television series Agatha Christie's Poirot
- DCI Sharpe of the Agatha Christie Hercule Poirot part of the anime television series Agatha Christie's Great Detectives Poirot and Marple
- DCI (both formerly and later Superintendent) Jack Meadows of the TV series The Bill
- DCI Frank Burnside of the TV series The Bill (in which he was a detective inspector) and his own series, Burnside
- DCI Frank Haskins of the TV series The Sweeney
- DCI (previously Detective Inspector, later Superintendent) Barney Crozier of the TV series Bergerac
- DCI Alan Banks of the Peter Robinson series of novels and the TV series DCI Banks
- DCI Jim Taggart of the TV series Taggart
- DCI Vera Stanhope of the TV series Vera
- DCI Thomas Nightingale of the Book Rivers of London
- DCI Gillian Murray of the TV series Scott & Bailey
- DCI Tony Gates of the TV Series Line of Duty
- DCI Roseanne Huntley of the TV Series Line of Duty
- DCI Joanne Davidson of the TV series Line of Duty
- DCI Richard Jury (later Superintendent) in several Martha Grimes novels
- DCI Sasha Miller of the TV series New Tricks
- DCI Lestrade of the Sherlock Holmes novels by Sir Arthur Conan Doyle
- DCI Cassandra 'Cassie' Stuart of the TV series Unforgotten
- DCI Charles Parker of the Lord Peter Wimsey novels by Dorothy L. Sayers
- DCI Karin Parke of the Black Mirror episode "Hated in the Nation"
- DCI Karl Roebuck of the TV series The Tunnel
- Chief Inspector Takeshi Kido of the TV series The Man in the High Castle
- DCI Amy Silva of the TV series Vigil
- DCI James (John) Taylor of the TV series Ludwig
- DCI Carl Morck of the TV series Dept. Q
- DCI James Hardy of the TV series Dept. Q
- Chief Inspector Jacques Clouseau of The Pink Panther franchise
- DCI Maxell Findley-Ryan of the DCI Ryan Mysteries by author LJ Ross

== See also ==
- List of police ranks
