= Inspector =

Police rank and administrative position

Inspector, also police inspector or inspector of police, is a police rank. The rank or position varies in seniority depending on the organization that uses it.

== Australia ==
The rank of Inspector is present in all Australian police forces except for the Northern Territory. Where it exists, it is generally the next senior rank from Senior Sergeant, and is the lowest commissioned rank. Uniformed officers of this rank wear epaulettes with three pips, matching a Captain in the army. In addition to the general rank of inspector, some police forces use other ranks such as detective inspector and district inspector.

== Austria ==
In Austria a similar scheme was used as in Germany. At some point the police inspector was completely removed from the list of service ranks. The current police service has an inspectors service track with Inspektor being the entry level – it is followed by Revierinspektor (precinct inspector), Gruppeninspektor (group inspector), Bezirksinspektor (district inspector), Abteilungsinspektor (section inspector), Kontrollinspektor (control inspector) and Chefinspektor (chief inspector).

== Canada ==
In most Canadian police services the rank of inspector is the first officer/commissioned officer rank, above that of staff sergeant. It is usually immediately below the rank of superintendent. Depending on the police force, an inspector may be considered senior management. The rank insignia of an inspector in Canada is usually a crown on the epaulettes, the insignia of a major in the army. In some police services such as the Royal Newfoundland Constabulary or the Vancouver Police Department, the rank insignia are three pips, similar to the insignia of an army captain, while in others including the Toronto Police Service and Peel Regional Police, the insignia consists of two maple leaves, similar to an army lieutenant's insignia.

Provincial police services and the majority of municipal police services, such as the Toronto Police Service have a staff inspector rank, which ranks above inspector and below superintendent.

== France ==
In the French National Police, inspecteur is a former rank of members of the Command and Management Corps. There were several grades of inspecteur, with senior detectives holding the various grades of commissaire. See French National Police for current ranks. In the French customs, inspecteur is the first rank of members of the Command and Management Corps.

== Germany ==
Currently, in Germany, Inspektor is a civil service rank. It is the lowest and therefore the entry rank of the gehobener Dienst (upper service) requiring a degree from a three-year administrative college. The rank is not used in the German police services; there the equivalent of inspector is Kommissar. In earlier times the upper service track was called Inspektorenlaufbahn (inspectors service track) ranging from Inspektor, Oberinspektor (senior inspector), Amtmann, Amtsrat to Oberamtsrat (senior supervisor).

The title is used on many professional areas that require an inspection service, like Brandinspektor (fire inspector in the fire department), Steuerinspektor (tax inspector in the financial department) and Bauinspektor (building inspector in building control) that are in a supervision position of their department. In many administrations, a corresponding position exists like Regierungsinspektor (government inspector on the federal level), Stadtinspektor/Stadtverwaltungsinspektor (city administration inspector), Kreisinspektor/Kreisverwaltungsinspektor (county administration inspector) that serve in supervision of the department.

In some regions Inspektor is a colloquial name for any police officer, just like in Austria.

== Hong Kong ==
In the Hong Kong Police Force, inspector (including probationary inspector, (senior inspector) is a rank senior to station sergeant but junior to chief inspector, leading a sub-unit between 30 and 80 people in day-to-day policing. The rank badge for probationary inspector is one silver pip on his or her epaulette; two silver pips for inspector of police; and two silver pips and one bar for senior inspector of police. The epaulettes rank badge for chief inspector is three silver pips. The epaulettes of all inspectors do not show their unique identification number. Plainclothes detective inspectors have the prefix "detective" identifying them as having been trained in criminal investigation and being part of the Criminal Investigation Department (CID) or Organised Crime Triad Bureau (OCTB).

Several of the HKP's past and current commissioner of chiefs joined the force as a probationary inspector.

The Customs and Excise Department also has an inspector rank but with bronze stars and bars rank badges instead.

In addition, there are health inspectors from the Food and Environmental Hygiene Department who carry out investigations and prosecutions on sanitary nuisances and food business irregularities under relevant ordinances. They are characterised by golden stars and yellow rank badges.

== India ==
Inspector rank insignia in the Indian police

An inspector of police in India is normally the officer in charge of a police station, and may be designated station house officer (SHO). In rural areas of some states, an inspector of police may be in charge of a police circle, which comprises two or more police stations. In this capacity, they are known as circle inspectors (CI), and supervise police stations under them. Inspectors oversee investigations and co-ordinate law enforcement operations in their respective jurisdictions, and may also head special units. Their insignia is three stars with a ribbon that is half red and half blue. The rank is above sub-inspector and below additional superintendent of police and deputy superintendent of police. Inspectors, along with sub-inspectors and assistant sub-inspectors, comprise around 13% of the total police personnel in India.

== Indonesia ==
In the Indonesian National Police, there are four levels of inspector, which are Inspektur Polisi Satu (first police inspector), Inspektur Polisi Dua (senior police inspector), Ajun Inspektur Polisi Satu (first police inspector adjutant), and Ajun Inspektur Polisi Dua (second police inspector adjutant). Those ranks are below the rank of Ajun Komisaris Polisi (police commissioner adjutant) and above the rank of Brigadir Polisi Kepala (chief police brigadier).

== Republic of Ireland ==
In the Garda Síochána in the Republic of Ireland, inspectors (Irish: cigire) are senior to sergeants and junior to superintendents. Inspectors may be either detectives or in uniform. There is no rank of chief inspector in the Garda.

== Italy ==
In the Polizia di Stato, the position of Ispettore (inspector) replaced the rank of Maresciallo (marshal) after the 1981 reorganization and demilitarization of the corps; an Ispettore is thus a sergeant of several sorts, above the rank of Sovrintendente (superintendent, which is somewhat equal to a senior corporal) and under the rank of Commissario (commissioner). There are three four inspector ranks in the Polizia di Stato: Vice Ispettore (assistant inspector), Ispettore (inspector), Ispettore Capo (chief inspector) and Ispettore Superiore (special inspector, or superior inspector), roughly equivalent to the ranks ranging from junior sergeant to second lieutenant. A fifth position, called Ispettore Superiore S.U.P.S., where the acronym stands for Sostituto Ufficiale di Pubblica Sicurezza (special inspector – substitute public safety commissioned officer), is used to designate those inspectors which can act as substitutes for commissioners in the chain of command under certain situations, or in police detachments that are too small to require the presence of a commissioner; when this happens, the officer is named Ispettore Superiore – Sostituto Commissario (special inspector – substitute commissioner). Inspectors can serve either in uniformed patrol duties, plainclothed patrol duties, or as detectives. The inspector ranks are the highest that an Italian police officer can reach without having a university degree.

== Malaysia ==
In the Royal Malaysia Police, the rank of inspector is one level above sub-inspector and one level below assistant superintendent. There are two stages: probation inspector (probation lasts within three years) and inspector. Inspectors are recruited differently from normal police constables, requiring at least a degree, and their training is longer.

== Montenegro ==
In the Police of Montenegro, the title of police inspector (policijski inspektor) is reserved for college or police academy educated staff, with six ranks based on seniority (junior police inspector, police inspector, police inspector I class, independent police inspector, senior police inspector, senior police inspector I class and chief police inspector). Although supervisory staff in uniformed police units also hold various police inspector ranks, in common parlance, the title of inspector is usually used referring to police officers working in plainclothes in criminal investigation units, equivalent to detective in some countries.

There are also numerous civilian inspector titles, fitting various inspection and supervision roles within governmental structure of Montenegro (health inspector, tax inspector, tourism inspector, etc.)

== Nepal ==
In the Nepal Police, the rank of inspector is generally the next senior rank from senior sub-inspector (SSI) and is less senior than a deputy superintendent of police (DSP). Members holding the rank usually wear an epaulette featuring one pair of crossed kukri, the same rank badge as an inspector in the Armed Police Force.

== New Zealand ==
Inspector epaulette insignia of the New Zealand Police

In the New Zealand Police, Inspector is the rank above Senior Sergeant and below Superintendent. Inspectors are the first rank that require the Governor General to approve their appointment, this process is known as commissioning. Inspectors in the New Zealand Police are equivalent to Chief Inspector in the Metropolitan Police or Captain in military ranks. The rank epaulette insignia is three stars or 'pips' on the rank slide.

Inspectors in the New Zealand Police are often in charge of groups or areas, positions held primary by Inspectors include, but are not limited to, Manager of the Fleet Service Group, Area Commanders, Police National Headquarters (PNHQ), District Group Manager (such as Road Policing or Criminal Investigation Branch).

== Papua New Guinea ==
In the Royal Papua New Guinea Constabulary, the rank of inspector is one level above chief sergeant and below senior inspector. Officer cadets normally graduate and automatically become an inspector.

== Philippines ==
In the Philippines, inspector is a rank in the Bureau of Jail Management and Penology and the Bureau of Fire Protection. It is above senior officer 4 (executive master sergeant) and below senior inspector (captain). It is regarded as an equivalent of a lieutenant in the army. It was formerly also used by the Philippine National Police.

== Poland ==
In Poland, inspector (inspektor) is a high rank (above podinspektor and młodszy inspektor, but below nadinspektor), comparable to colonel of the armed forces.

== Romania ==
In the Romanian Police, inspector is a rank senior to subinspector and junior to inspector principal and corresponds to the former rank of police lieutenant (see Romanian Police § Ranks).

== Singapore ==
In the Singapore Police Force, there are several ranks that have the title of inspector in it.

In the junior police officer category, there is the rank of station inspector, senior station inspector and senior station inspector (2). The title of inspector is in the senior police officer category. For National Servicemen, outstanding policemen may be appointed as a National Service probationary inspector.

In the National Police Cadet Corps, the rank of probationary inspector is given to officer cadet trainees who have successfully completed their Officers' Basic Training Course or Honorary Officers' Basic Training Course. Probationary inspectors who pass their probationary period will then attain the rank of inspector. The rank insignia of probationary inspector and inspector is two pips, with the letters NPCC below it, so as to differentiate NPCC inspectors from Singapore Police Force personnel.

== Spain ==
In Spain, the rank of inspector exists in the National Police Force of Spain (Cuerpo Nacional de Policía), the Catalan Police Force, and several municipal police forces.

== Sri Lanka ==
In the Sri Lanka Police, inspector of police (IP) is senior to sub-inspector and junior to chief inspector. In many towns, inspectors would be the officer in charge (OIC) at most police stations. The rank insignia for a police inspector is two stars. All those officers are deemed to be gazzated officers and staff grade officers of public service.

In addition to the police, the term inspector is used in other government departments for posts such as chief inspector of excise, inspector of excise, chief inspector of customs, inspector of customs, co-operative inspector, fisheries inspector, public health inspector.

== Switzerland ==
In Switzerland, policing responsibilities are primarily delegated to the cantons, which is why the organization of law enforcement agencies can vary considerably from one region to another. In the French-speaking part of the country, the rank of inspector (inspecteur) is generally assigned to officers working in criminal investigation units. These officers are responsible for investigating complex criminal cases or offenses of a certain degree of seriousness.

In the canton of Valais, for example, inspectors are assigned to the Police judiciaire. The ranks, in order of seniority, are inspecteur III, inspecteur II, inspecteur I, inspecteur principal adjoint and inspecteur principal.

== United Kingdom ==
UK police inspector epaulette

Within the British police, inspector is the second supervisory rank. It is senior to that of sergeant, and junior to that of chief inspector. The rank is mostly operational, meaning that inspectors are directly concerned with day-to-day policing. Uniformed inspectors are often responsible for supervising a duty shift made up of constables and sergeants, or act in specialist roles such as supervising road traffic policing.

The rank of inspector has existed since the foundation of the Metropolitan Police, formed in 1829, when it was used to designate the rank immediately below that of superintendent, and many Commonwealth police forces also use the term.

Plainclothes detective inspectors (DI) are equal in rank to their uniformed counterparts, the prefix "detective" identifying them as having been trained in criminal investigation and being part of or attached to their force's Criminal Investigation Department (CID).

The epaulettes of uniformed inspectors, unlike those of constables and sergeants, do not show a divisional or personal identification number. Instead they feature Order of the Bath stars, informally known as "pips", being the same insignia as those of a lieutenant in the British Army.

In the Metropolitan Police, the rank was formerly officially known as station inspector to distinguish it from the more senior rank of sub-divisional inspector (abolished in 1949). A station inspector wore a single star on his epaulettes until 1936, when this changed to a star over two bars to accommodate the new rank of junior station inspector (wearing a star over one bar).

== United States ==
In the United States, the term inspector can have very different meanings depending on the law enforcement agency.

=== Municipal police ===
An inspector in a US municipal police department is more likely to be a senior executive officer, analogous to a Commonwealth police superintendent or chief superintendent. It may also be a title held by a supervisor of detectives.

In the New York City Police Department, a deputy inspector is one grade above captain, wearing the insignia of a military major, and an inspector is another grade higher, wearing the insignia of a military colonel. In the Philadelphia Police Department, a staff inspector is a grade above captain and an inspector is another grade higher, with the insignia of a lieutenant colonel. An inspector is also two grades above a captain in the Baltimore Police Department, Nassau County Police Department and Suffolk County Police Department.

Inspector is more rarely used as a rank that is one grade above captain, such as in the Metropolitan Police Department of the District of Columbia. This is equivalent to a major or commander in other departments. The Los Angeles Police Department formerly had a rank of inspector for this purpose. It was changed to commander in 1974.

In the police departments of Hayward, California, Oklahoma City and formerly in Berkeley, California, inspector was the rank held by a senior detective.

In the San Francisco Police Department, inspector is the normal title for a detective. Unlike detectives in most other departments, inspectors in San Francisco always have supervisory duties. This is one of the few modern remaining cases of inspector being used as a title for detectives. A few other police or sheriff's departments, such as the Portsmouth, Rhode Island police department, also use the title in that capacity.

Inspector is sometimes used as the title for internal affairs investigators within a police or sheriff's department, including in Florida's Alachua County Sheriff's Office.

=== State police ===
In the Wisconsin State Patrol, and others, inspectors are state troopers assigned to the motor carrier safety inspection unit where they enforce trucking laws and regulations. The Michigan State Police recognizes inspector as a formal rank. Unlike municipal or county police/sheriffs' inspectors, Michigan State Police inspectors are a grade below captain, instead of at least one grade above. New York State Police staff inspectors are senior commissioned officers holding the rank above major and below lieutenant colonel.

The North Carolina Department of Transportation's Division of Motor Vehicles License and Theft Bureau uses the title of inspector for its sworn state law enforcement agents/investigators. The inspectors of this agency investigate motor vehicle theft, title and odometer frauds, state issued identification and driver's license frauds, as well as regulate and inspect motor vehicle dealerships, repair shops, tow and storage facilities, and emissions and safety inspection centers. The NC DMV License and Theft Bureau is the state's oldest law enforcement agency and was formed in 1921 to combat vehicle theft with the rising sales of Ford's Model T. The agency has kept the title designation of inspector for traditional purposes.

The Oregon Liquor Control Commission uses the title of inspector for sworn law enforcement agents who investigate violations of the Liquor Control Act and other related crimes.

=== Federal agencies ===
In the Federal Bureau of Investigation (FBI), an inspector is a special agent whose main duty is inspecting local field offices and resident agencies to make sure they are operating efficiently. Since FBI inspectors are not tied to any particular field office, they have, in the past, also been used as troubleshooting investigators on major cases. Joseph Sullivan was perhaps the best-known of the Bureau's major case inspectors and served as the model for Inspector Lew Erskine, the fictional character played by Efrem Zimbalist Jr. in the 1965–1974 ABC TV series The FBI. Samuel P. Cowley was an FBI inspector in the late 1920s and 1930s who assisted in bringing down notorious gangsters such as John Dillinger in the early 1930s, before his death in November 1934 in a gun battle with Baby Face Nelson.

The United States Marshals Service and the Drug Enforcement Administration employ similar positions, but they primarily serve as internal affairs investigators.

The United States Park Police changed the rank of inspector to the rank of major, which is between captain and deputy chief.

In the Postal Inspection Service, inspector is the name given to 1811 job series criminal investigators, better known as special agents in most other federal law enforcement agencies.

Prior to 2003, the US Customs Service (USCS) and the Immigration and Naturalization Service (INS) had uniformed law enforcement employees called customs inspectors and immigration inspectors. These employees inspected and processed people and merchandise entering the United States from foreign countries, at a land border, seaport or airport. They wore different types of uniforms and had different duties, but were paid essentially the same. After US Customs and Border Protection (CBP) was established with the merging of the above two agencies, the inspectors were retitled Customs and Border Protection Officers and merged their responsibilities.

=== Administrative law ===
In American administrative law, an inspector is an official charged with the duty to issue permits, such as a building inspector or sanitation inspector, and to enforce the relevant regulations and laws. These positions are commonly known as the fire inspector or building inspector. The duty it act is based on the adopted building or fire code in the municipality. A government agency may also have an inspector general responsible for preventing internal fraud, waste, abuse and other agency deficiencies.

== See also ==
- Police rank
- Detective
- Investigator (disambiguation)
- Special agent
- Suffixes (or, er, ar, history)
