= Superintendent (police) =

Rank in British police services and in most English-speaking Commonwealth nations

Superintendent (Supt) is a rank in the British police and in most English-speaking Commonwealth nations. In many Commonwealth countries, the full version is superintendent of police (SP). The rank is also used in most British Overseas Territories, in many former British colonies, as well as in Portugal and in several former Portuguese colonies. In some countries, such as Italy, the rank of superintendent is a lower rank.

== Rank insignia of superintendent ==
Australian Federal Police

Bangladesh Police

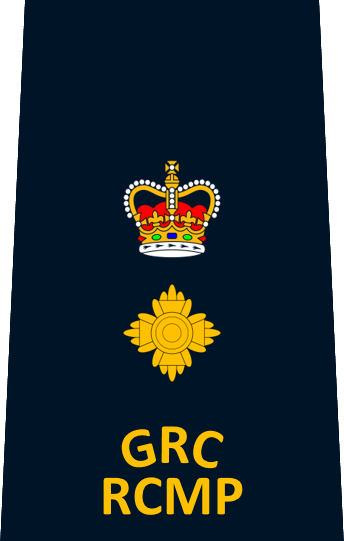
Royal Canadian Mounted Police

New Zealand Police

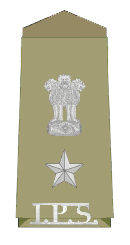
Indian Police

Garda Síochána

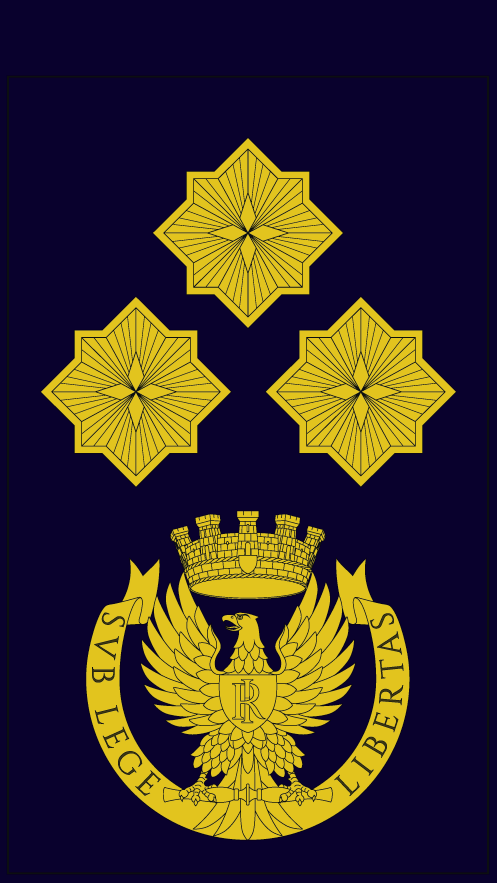
Italian State Police

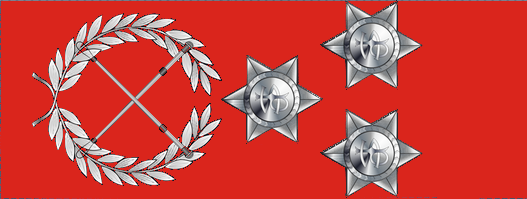
Macau Public Security Police

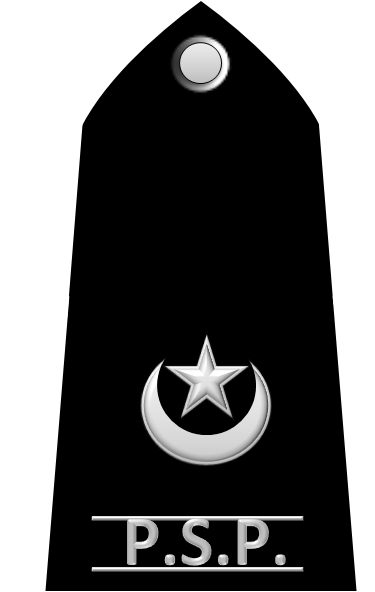
Police Service of Pakistan

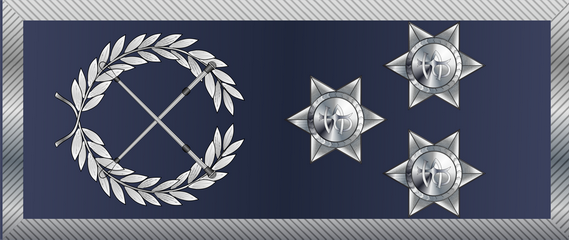
Portuguese Public Security Police

Singapore Police Force

National Police Agency (South Korea)

Swedish Police

Metropolitan Police

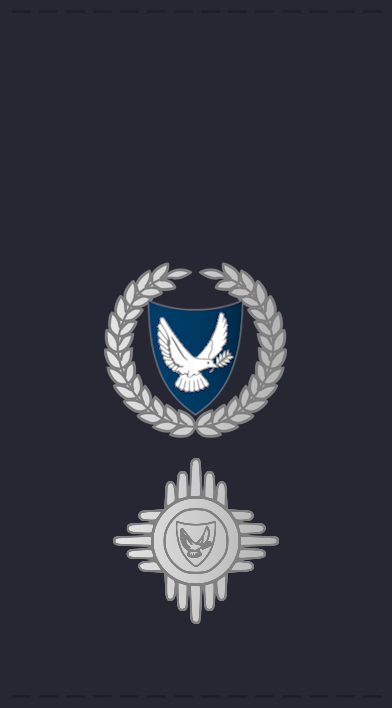
Cyprus Police

== By country ==
=== Australia ===
In Australia, the rank of superintendent is the next senior rank from chief Inspector and is less senior than a chief superintendent (Victoria Police, South Australia Police, New South Wales Police, Queensland Police) or an assistant commissioner (Western Australia Police). Some officers also hold the rank of detective chief superintendent (though this is seldom used) and detective superintendent. Superintendents wear an epaulette bearing one pip below a crown, the same rank badge as a lieutenant-colonel and wear police caps with a laurel wreath across the brim to indicate seniority.

=== Bangladesh ===
In Bangladesh, the rank of superintendent of police (SP) is the next rank above additional superintendent of police (ASP) and below additional deputy inspector-general of police (Addl.DIG). In metropolitan units, a superintendent is called a deputy police commissioner. In Special Branch, they are known as special superintendent of police.

=== Canada ===
In Canada, the rank of superintendent is usually the next senior rank up from inspector. Some police forces also have the higher rank of staff superintendent (senior staff superintendent) or regional superintendent. Quebec-based police forces (e.g. Sureté du Québec, Service de police de la Ville de Montréal, Quebec City Police Service) do not use this rank or rank structure.

=== Hong Kong ===
Hong Kong Police Force ranks are based on the British system:

- Chief superintendent – in command of a branch or district formation
- Senior superintendent – second in charge of a district or commander of a bureau
- Superintendent – in command of HQ unit or police division

=== India ===
In India, Superintendent of Police (SP) is a senior gazetted officer rank held by officers of both the Indian Police Service (IPS) and the State Police Services (SPS). They are typically appointed as the head of a police district and may also head specialised units of the state police, such as the crime branch, special branch, traffic police, railway police, telecommunication, etc. The rank is above additional superintendent of police and below deputy inspector general of police.

In the state of Kerala, superintendents of police in charge of districts are called district police chiefs.

=== Ireland ===
In the Republic of Ireland the rank of superintendent is between inspector and chief superintendent. There are usually two or three assigned to each division. Detectives use the "detective" prefix. There were 178 superintendents in the Garda Síochána at the beginning of 2006. In the Irish language, a Garda superintendent is a ceannfort, which translates literally as "headman". Ard-Cheannfort is a chief superintendent or "high headman". Ceannfort is also used for the military rank of "commandant", equivalent to major.

Each police district is commanded by a superintendent. Districts are sub-units of divisions, which are commanded by chief superintendents.

=== Italy ===
In the Italian Polizia di Stato, the rank of vicequestore equals a British police superintendent, while the rank of sovrintendente (Italian for superintendent) is a low-level rank, equal to a British or American police sergeant and also equal to sergeant in the Italian military.

=== Japan ===
In Japan, it is used by the Prefectural police for the officer in command of a smaller police station. It is equivalent to the Japanese army rank of lieutenant colonel.

=== Macau ===
Superintendent general and superintendent are, respectively, the ranks of the commander and deputy commanders of the Public Security Police (CPSP) of Macau. The rank of superintendent is senior to the rank of intendent.

The CPSP rank insignia follows the generic model of the Portuguese Public Security Police, with the insignia of senior officers consisting of epaulets that contain two crossed horsewhips inside a laurel wreath and PSP stars (six-point silver star with the "SP" monogram in the center) whose number defines the precise rank. The number of stars in the insignia of superintendent general and superintendent are, respectively, four and three. The rank insignia of superintendent general and superintendent are also distinguished in being in red epaulets instead of the dark blue of the other ranks.

=== New Zealand ===
In New Zealand, the rank of superintendent is above inspector and below assistant commissioner. Superintendents are typically appointed as district commanders or directors of service centres, and the rank is also held by the commandant of the Royal New Zealand Police College.

=== Pakistan ===
In Pakistan, a senior superintendent of police is the head of the district police. Some districts and police divisions are commanded by superintendents of police. The police service of Pakistan now identifies a new hierarchy including DPO (District Police Officer), CCPO (Capital City Police Officer) etc. Superintendent of Police is equivalent to DPO [or CPO (City Police Officer) in smaller districts] and can be a CSP recruit belonging to PSP (Police Service of Pakistan) and can also be a ranker.

=== Papua New Guinea ===
In the Royal Papua New Guinea Constabulary, the rank of superintendent is above chief inspector and below chief superintendent.

=== Philippines ===
In the Philippines, superintendent is a rank in the Philippine National Police, the Bureau of Jail Management and Penology, and the Bureau of Fire Protection. It is above chief inspector and below senior superintendent and is regarded as the equivalent of lieutenant colonel in the Philippine Army.

=== Portugal ===
In Portugal, superintendent (Portuguese: superintendente) is an officer rank in the Public Security Police (PSP). It is senior to the police rank of intendant and inferior to the rank of chief superintendent, being roughly equivalent to a colonel in the military.

Superintendents usually exercise the role of commanding officers of district commands or the role of second-in-command in the metropolitan and regional commands.

The rank insignia of a superintendent consists of a dark blue epaulet with two crossed horsewhips inside a laurel wreath and three PSP stars arranged in an inverted triangle. Each PSP star consists of a six-point silver star with the "SP" monogram in the center.

=== Singapore ===
In Singapore, the rank is used in both the Singapore Police Force (SPF) and the Immigration and Checkpoints Authority (ICA) as both use the same rank structure. In the SPF, there are three tiers of superintendent: assistant superintendent of police (ASP); deputy superintendent of police (DSP); and superintendent of police (SUPT). These three ranks fall under the senior police officer category.

=== South Africa ===
==== Pre-Union ====
The rank was introduced in 1825, for the head of the Cape Town police. It was discontinued in 1860.

It was also used in the short-lived Griqualand Mounted Police from 1873 to 1880 and in the Natal Police from 1894 to 1913, the Transvaal Town Police from 1901 to 1908, the Transvaal Police from 1908 to 1913, and the Orange River Colony Police from 1908 to 1913.

==== Post-Union ====
The rank reappeared in the Union of South Africa as the rank of the head of the South African Railways & Harbours Police in 1944. It was equivalent to the military rank of colonel, with the same rank insignia. From 1946, there were three grades: chief superintendent (brigadier), deputy chief superintendent (colonel), and superintendent (lieutenant-colonel). The police titles were replaced by the military titles in the 1960s.

The title was reinstated for the South African Police Service in 1995. There were two grades: senior superintendent (equivalent to colonel) and superintendent (lieutenant-colonel). The police titles were replaced by the military titles in 2010.

=== Sri Lanka ===
In Sri Lanka, superintendent of police (SP) is a senior gazetted officer rank senior to assistant superintendent of police and junior to senior superintendent of police. The latter was created in the 1980s. Superintendents are typically appointed as regional commanders of police divisions.

=== United Kingdom ===
The rank of superintendent is senior to chief inspector and junior to chief superintendent. The rank badge is a crown worn on the epaulettes, the same as a major in the British Army.

==== Metropolitan Police ====
The rank of superintendent was introduced at the foundation of the Metropolitan Police in 1829. Each division was commanded by a superintendent. The rank below superintendent was originally inspector until the introduction of chief inspector in 1868. Originally, only the commissioners held a higher rank than superintendent (and they were not sworn police officers). In 1839, Captain William Hay was appointed to the new rank of inspecting superintendent, replaced by assistant commissioner in 1856. The rank of district superintendent was introduced between superintendent and assistant commissioner in 1869, and was renamed chief constable in 1886.

The rank of superintendent was also adopted in the Detective Branch (later the Criminal Investigation Department) from 1868, when Adolphus Williamson, the first head of the branch, was promoted to the rank.

In 1949, Metropolitan Police superintendents were regraded to the new rank of chief superintendent, chief inspectors were regraded to superintendent, and sub-divisional inspectors and divisional detective inspectors were regraded to chief inspector (with those ranks being abolished).

In September 1953, there was another change, when the rank was split into superintendent grade I (current superintendents, chief inspectors commanding sub-divisions and detective chief inspectors commanding divisional CIDs) and superintendent grade II (other current chief inspectors), with a redefined rank of chief inspector being created for senior inspectors. Superintendents grade II wore the crown (the rank badge formerly worn by chief inspectors), with superintendents grade I wearing a crown over a pip (the rank badge formerly worn by superintendents). This lasted until 1974, when superintendent once more became a single rank, wearing a crown on the epaulettes.

From January 1954 there was one superintendent grade I and one chief inspector in each sub-division, one chief superintendent, one superintendent grade II and one detective superintendent grade I in each division, and one commander, one deputy commander, one detective chief superintendent, and one detective superintendent grade II in each district. A detective chief inspector was added in each division later in 1954.

==== Other British forces ====
In most other forces, superintendent lay between inspector and assistant chief constable until well into the 20th century. In many smaller forces, the senior superintendent was also the ACC. Some forces had chief inspectors, and some later acquired chief superintendents, but this was by no means universal. Today, however, every force in the country has all three ranks.

==== Salary ====
A superintendent's starting salary, as of 2024, is £80,784 rising to £95,025 after five years. These salaries may be affected by regional and competency pay allowances.

=== United States ===
In the United States, superintendent is the title used for the head of certain police departments, such as the New Jersey State Police, Police Command Staff in New York State Police, Massachusetts State Police, Chicago Police Department, New Orleans Police Department, Ohio State Highway Patrol, Missouri State Highway Patrol, Oregon State Police, and Indiana State Police. In some police departments, superintendent is instead the title used to describe a position with responsibilities that would be given in other police departments to bureau or division chiefs, with examples being the Cambridge Police Department, Boston Police Department and Dayton, Ohio Police Department.

== See also ==
- Commissaire de police
- Senior superintendent
- Chief superintendent
