= Police transport =

Transportation used by police

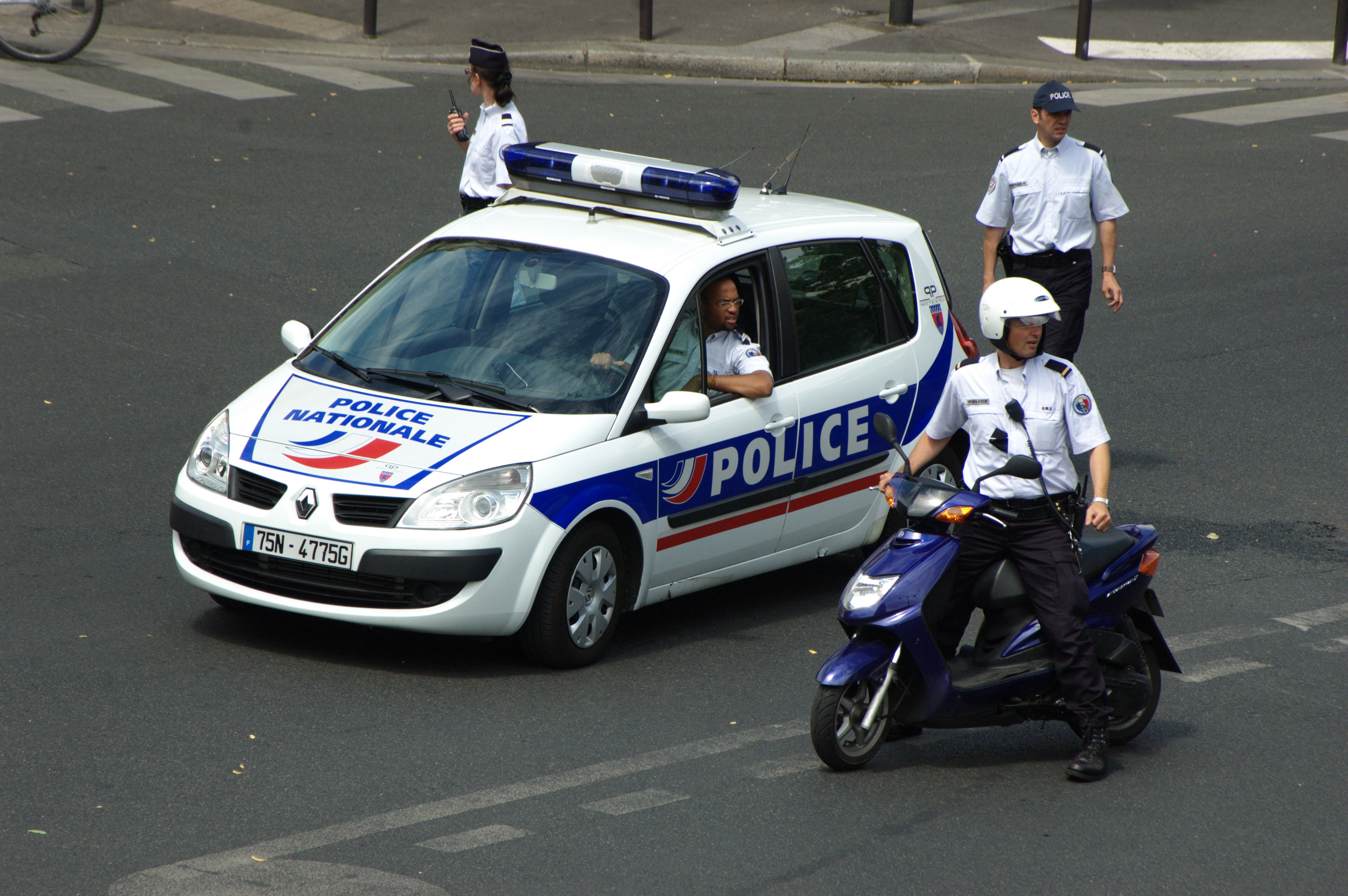
French National Police officers using various forms of transportation, namely a police car, a police motorcycle, and foot patrol

Police transport refers to any form of transportation used by police in their duties. These primarily include methods for patrol and prisoner transport.

== Ground ==
=== Motorized ===
==== Four-wheels ====
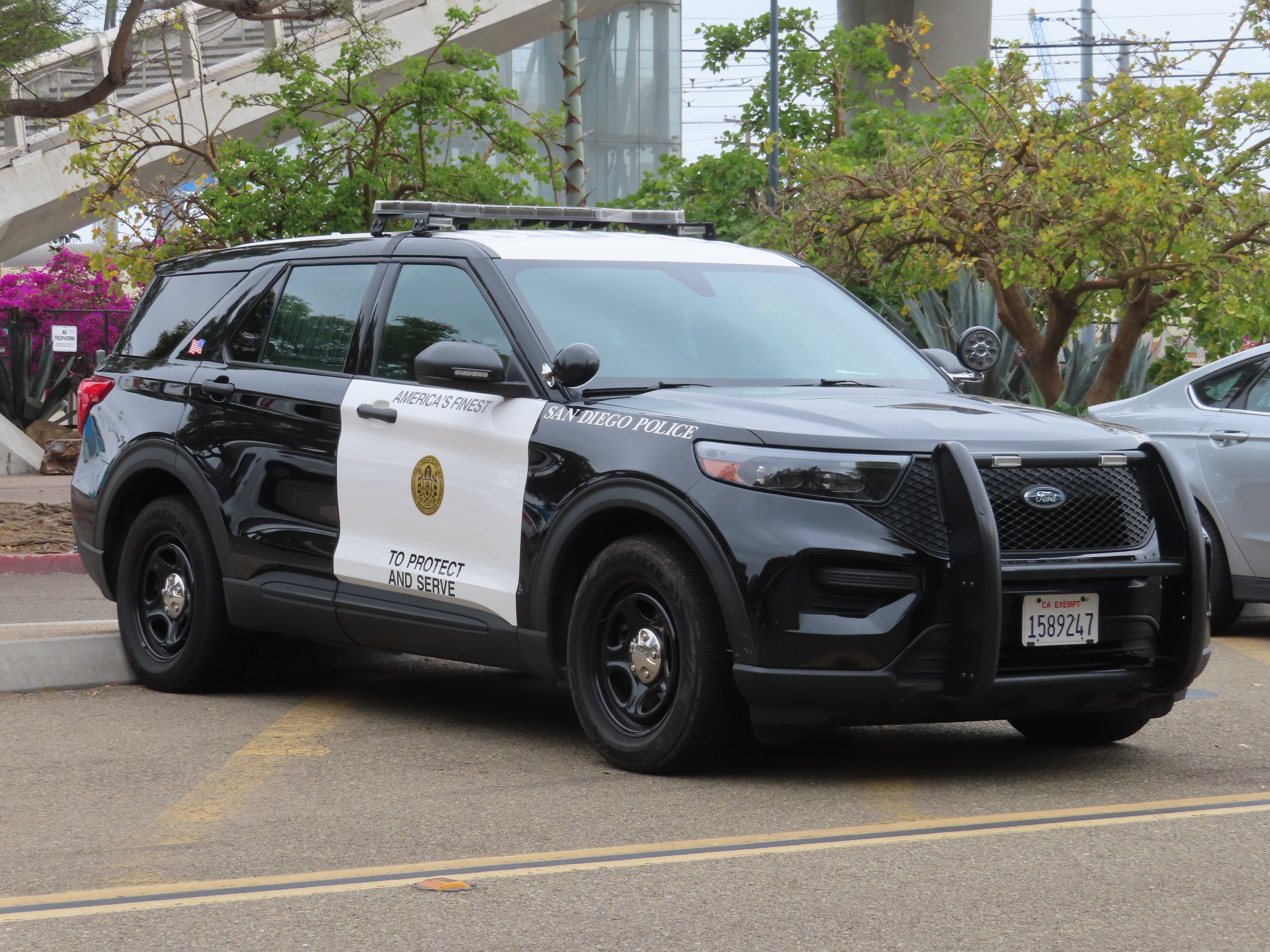
A Ford Police Interceptor Utility used by the San Diego Police Department

A police car is the description for a vehicle used by police, to assist with their duties in patrolling and responding to incidents. Typical uses of a police car include transportation for officers to reach the scene of an incident quickly, to transport criminal suspects, or to patrol an area, while providing a high visibility deterrent to crime. Some police cars are specially adapted for work on busy roads.

The first police car was a wagon run by electricity fielded on the streets of Akron, Ohio in 1899. The first operator of the police patrol wagon was Akron Police officer Louis Mueller Sr. It could reach 16 mph (26 km/h) and travel 30 mi (48 km) before its battery needed to be recharged. The car was built by city mechanical engineer Frank Loomis. The $2,400 vehicle was equipped with electric lights, gongs and a stretcher. The car's first assignment was to pick up an intoxicated man at Main and Exchange streets.

Commonly known names to describe police cars are (police) cruiser, squad car, panda car, area car and patrol car. Depending on the configuration of the emergency lights, a police car may also be called a marked unit. In some places a police car may also be informally known as a cop car, a black and white, a cherry top, a gumball machine, or a jam sandwich, from the early 1950s, until the late 1970s, the lights were different from most areas, with two forward-facing, stationary red lights, with amber flashing lights facing rearward, inside of black metal housings mounted to the roof of the car.

In some areas of the world, the police car has become more widely used than police officers "walking the beat", because cars allow patrols to cover a much greater area in less time. In addition to cars, police trucks are also often used for situations in which a car would not be practical.

==== Two-wheels ====
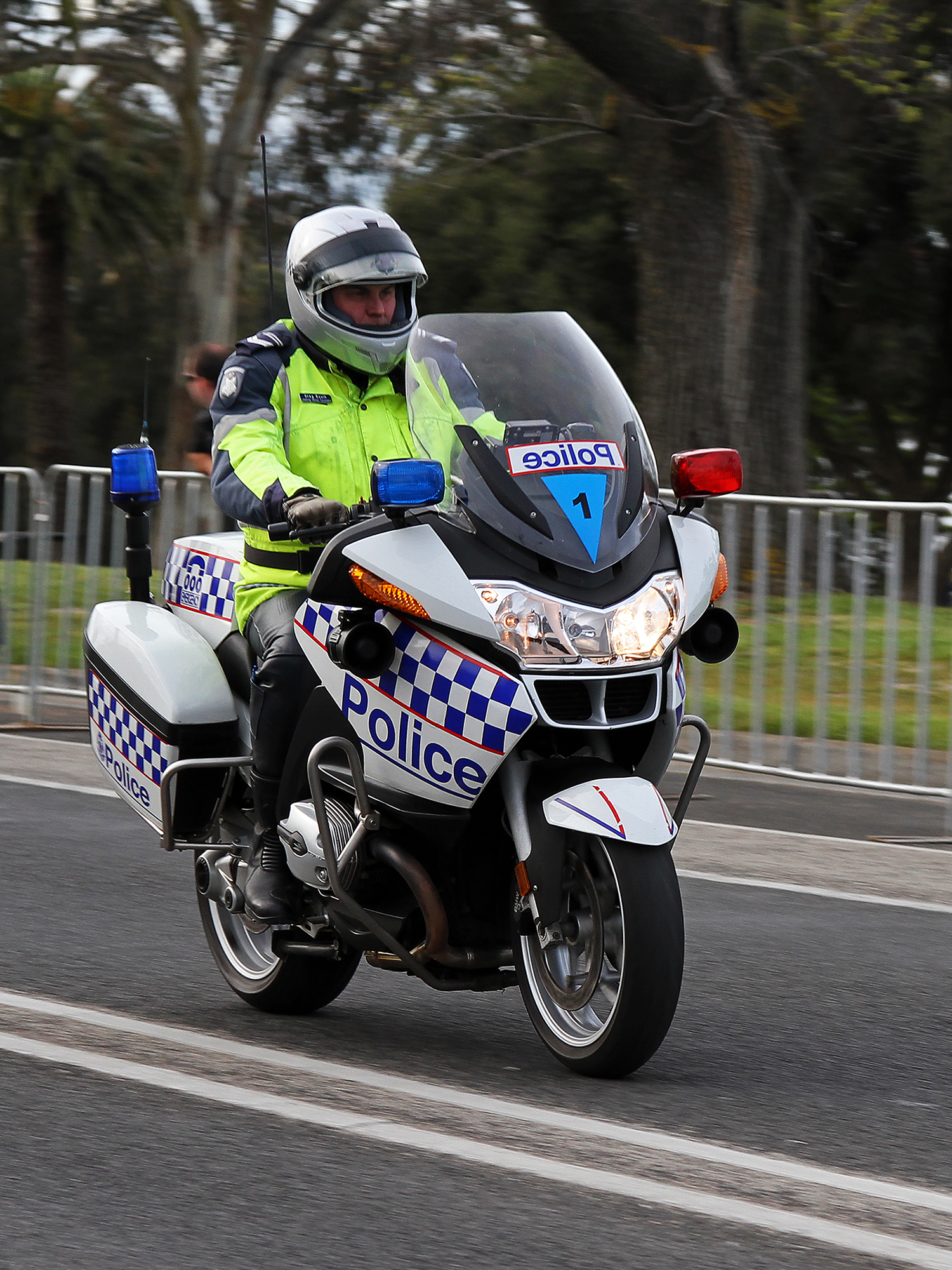
A BMW R1200RT used by the Victoria Police

A police motorcycle is a motorcycle used by various police forces and departments. They may be custom designed to meet the requirements unique of a particular use. A police motorcycle is often called a "motor" by police officers in the United States. Similarly, motorcycle units are known as motor units and motorcycle officers are known as motor officers.

The maneuverability of the motorcycle on crowded streets offer advantages not provided by larger, more traditional police vehicles. The motorcycle's relatively small size allows it to get to accident scenes more quickly when incidents such as traffic collisions slow down access by four-wheel vehicles.

Police motorcycles in the United States and Canada typically use purpose-built motorcycles marketed by Harley-Davidson, Kawasaki, Honda, or BMW. Kawasaki Police Motorcycles, which were built for the US market in Lincoln, Nebraska, ceased production in September 2005.

In the United Kingdom, the most common police motorcycles are the BMW RT series and the Yamaha FJR1300. Police forces have withdrawn the Honda ST1300 Pan-European since the death of an officer was blamed on the machine. Some police forces also use scooters within towns, or special-purpose machines such as unmarked (covert), or off-road motorcycles.

Of the British manufacturers themselves, Triumph motorcycles, built at Meriden, were used by some British and mainly Commonwealth police forces until 1983 when the factory closed. The police version of the Triumph Thunderbird was nicknamed the Saint, an acronym of "Stops Anything In No Time". Norton's Commando Interpol and later Wankel rotary engine Interpol 2 motorcycle were used by some British forces until that firm's collapse in the early 1990s. Other marques such a BSA were used by some forces although only the Velocette LE 'noddy-bike' model proved as popular with the police as the Triumphs.

In 2008, BMW claimed to be the largest seller of motorcycles for authority use, as more than 100,000 BMW motorcycles were in official use in over 150 countries on five continents. In 2007, BMW sold 4,284 police motorcycles worldwide. BMW produces police-specific models such as the R1200RT-P and R900RT-P. More than 225 U.S. law enforcement agencies, including the California Highway Patrol, have BMW authority motorcycles in their fleets of patrol vehicles. In 2021 BMW announced a 75 mph scooter as a concept for law enforcement.

In 2020, electric kick scooters were trialed by municipal police in Honfleur and Vias, Hérault in France, Santa Barbara and California State University.

==== Three-wheels ====
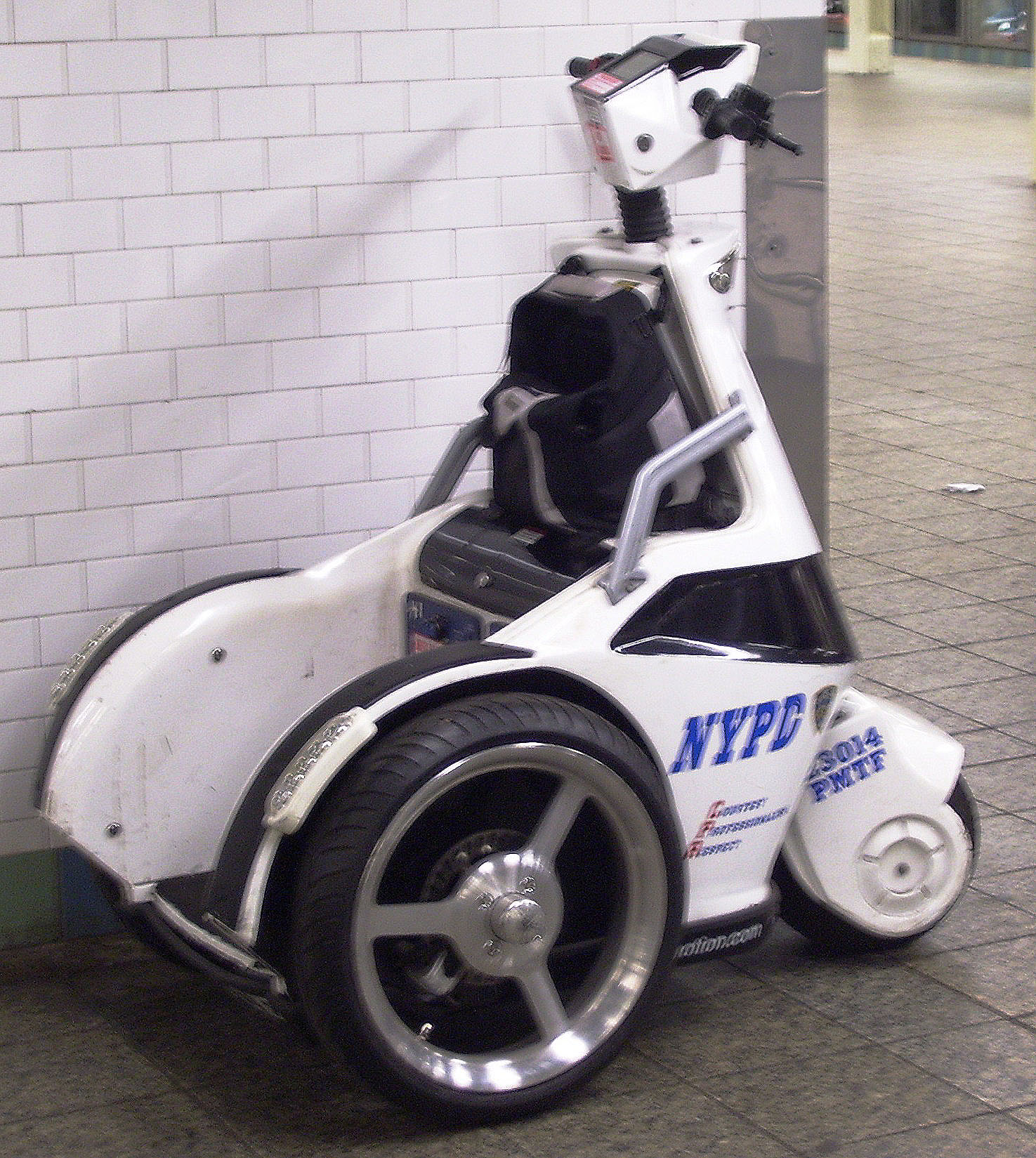
A three-wheeled scooter used by the New York City Police Department to patrol the New York City Subway

Comparatively rare, some police departments do use smaller, three-wheeled vehicles, such Cushman scooters, for various uses but are most commonly known for their use in parking enforcement, particularly by the New York Police Department and San Francisco Police Department. Additionally, two- and three-wheeled electric standing scooters (such as Segways) are commonly also used for parking enforcement and in a patrol capacity similar to bicycles. Three-wheeled mini-trucks, like the Piaggio Ape, have been used by police department in Europe as well.

=== Unmotorized ===
==== Two-wheels ====
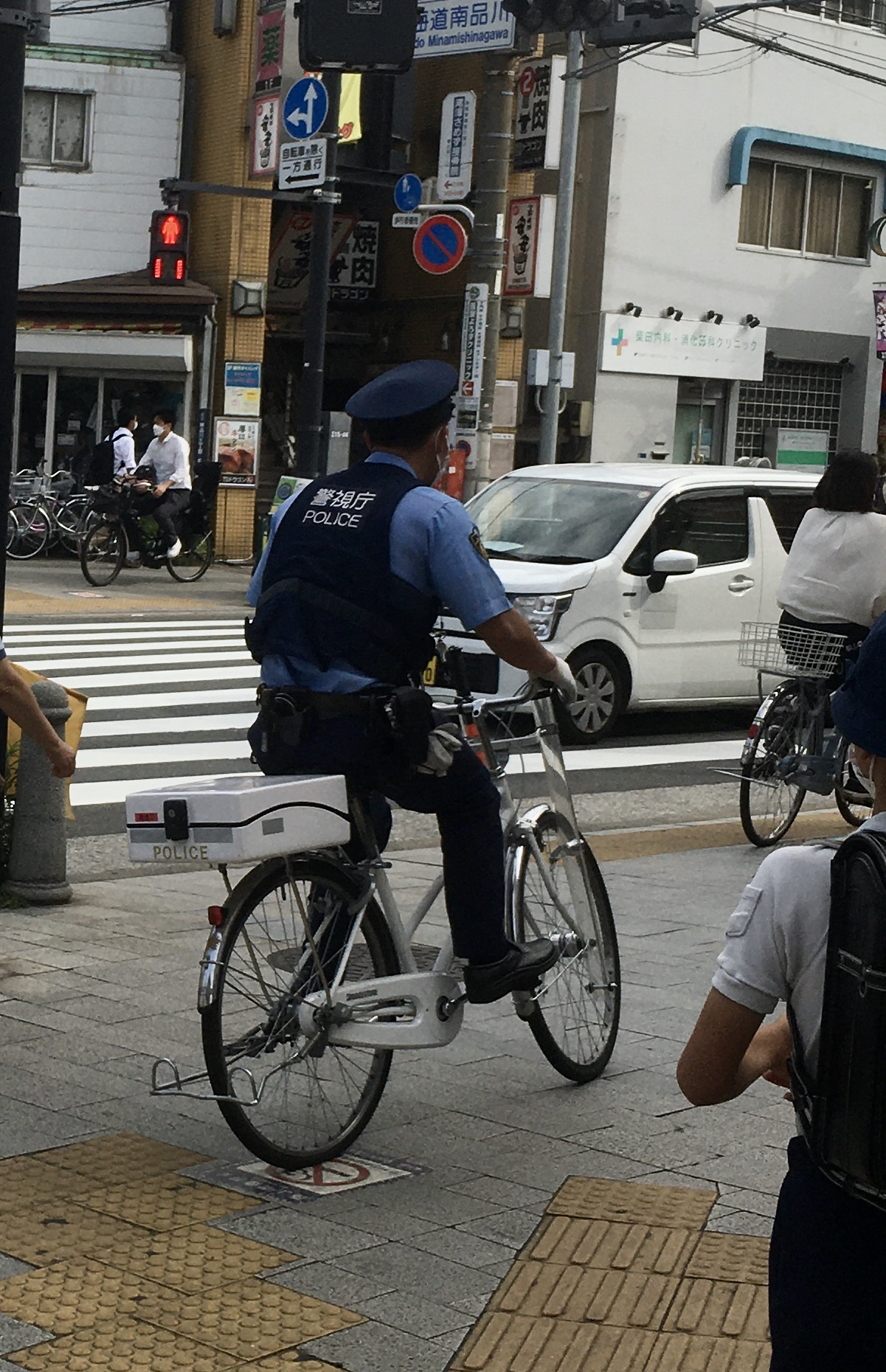
A bicycle used by the Tokyo Metropolitan Police Department

A police bicycle is a land vehicle used by police departments, most commonly in the form of a mountain bicycle. They are designed to meet the requirements unique to each department.

The maneuverability of these vehicles on crowded sidewalks and their ability to navigate narrow, crowded driveways offer advantages over what is provided by more traditional police vehicles. Use of bicycles instead of cars can make police officers more easily approachable, especially in low-crime areas. Bicycles can also be issued to police officers to enhance the mobility and range of foot patrols. Bicycles are also effective crime-fighting tools when used in densely populated urban areas. The bikes are nearly silent in operation and many criminals do not realize that an approaching person on a bike is actually a police officer. Furthermore, if the criminal attempts to flee on foot, the riding police officer has a speed advantage while able to quickly dismount if necessary.

The bicycles are custom designed for law enforcement use. Many manufacturers of bicycles offer police models, including Trek, Cannondale and Fuji. Other companies offer police, fire and EMS specific models, including Volcanic Manufacturing in Olympia, Washington. Many are equipped with a rear rack and bag to hold equipment.

==== Mounted ====
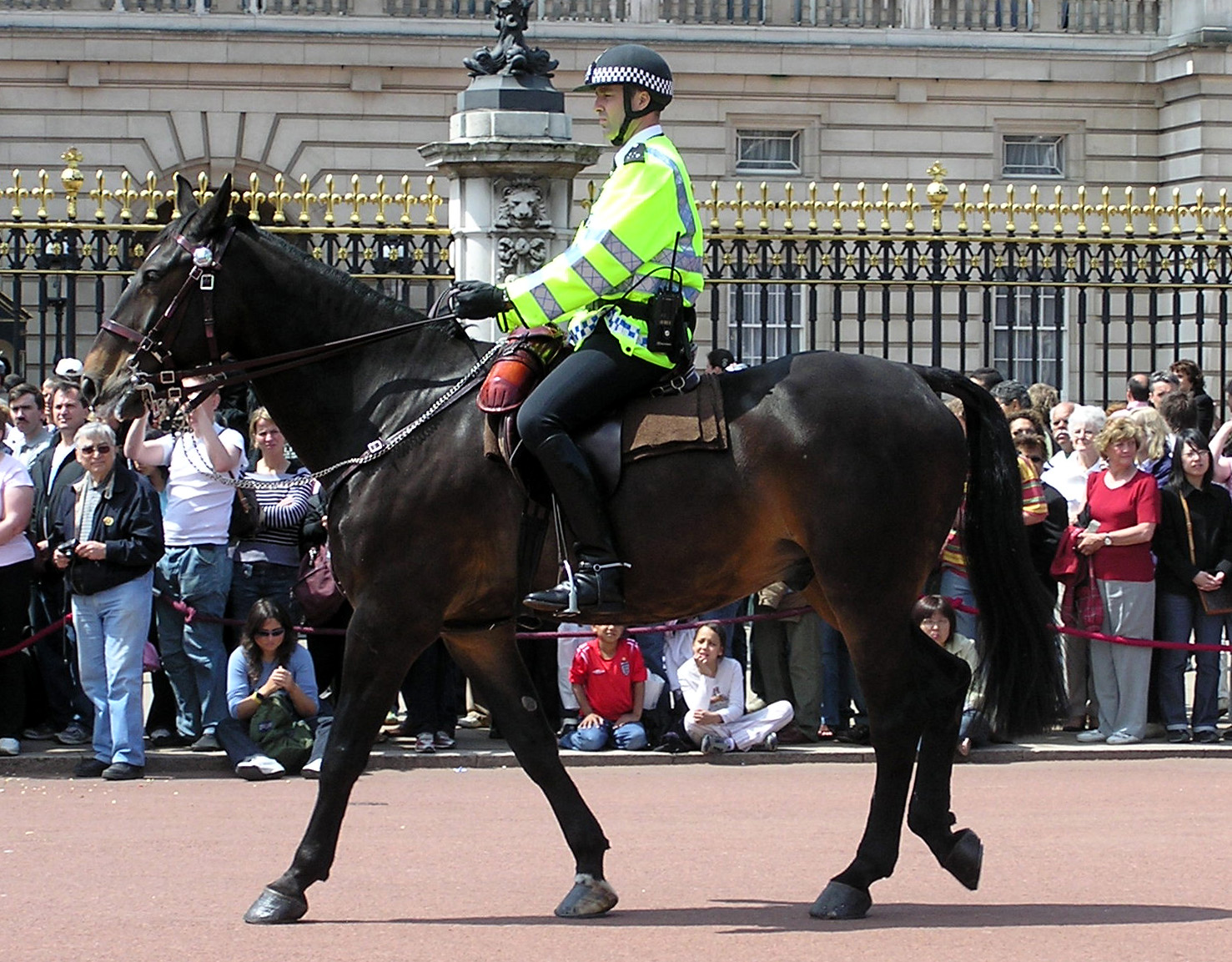
A mounted Metropolitan Police officer

Mounted police do patrols on horseback (equestrians) or camelback. They continue to serve in remote areas and in metropolitan areas where their day-to-day function may be picturesque or ceremonial, but they are also employed in crowd control because of their mobile mass and height advantage and increasingly in the UK for crime prevention and high visibility policing roles. Mounted police may be employed for specialized duties ranging from patrol of parks and wilderness areas, where police cars would be impractical or noisy, to riot duty, where the horse serves to intimidate those whom it is desired to disperse through its larger size, or may be sent in to snatch trouble makers or offenders from the crowd.

A well-known mounted police force is the Royal Canadian Mounted Police (RCMP). The RCMP now uses standard police methods and does not use any horses operationally. However, horses are used in the Musical Ride as well as by several provincial and municipal police detachments. In the United States, mounted patrols are still essential to local law enforcement operations. The largest Midwestern mounted patrol is in the Minneapolis Police Department of Minneapolis, Minnesota. The U.S. Border Patrol had 200 horses in 2005. Most of these are employed along the Mexico–United States border. In Canada, urban police forces use mounted patrols for areas inaccessible by motorized units.

== Aerial ==
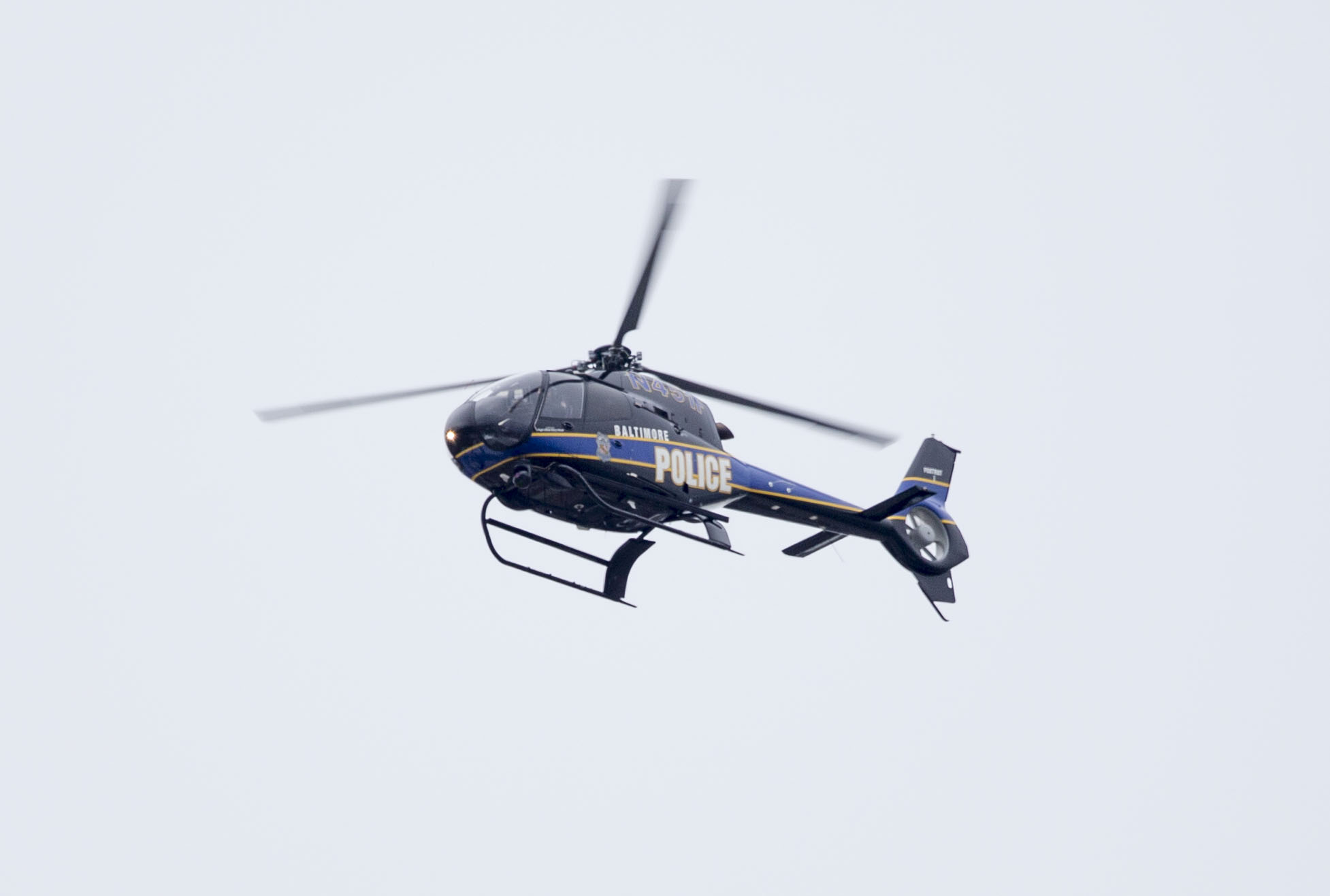
A Eurocopter EC120 Colibri used by the Baltimore Police Department in the United States

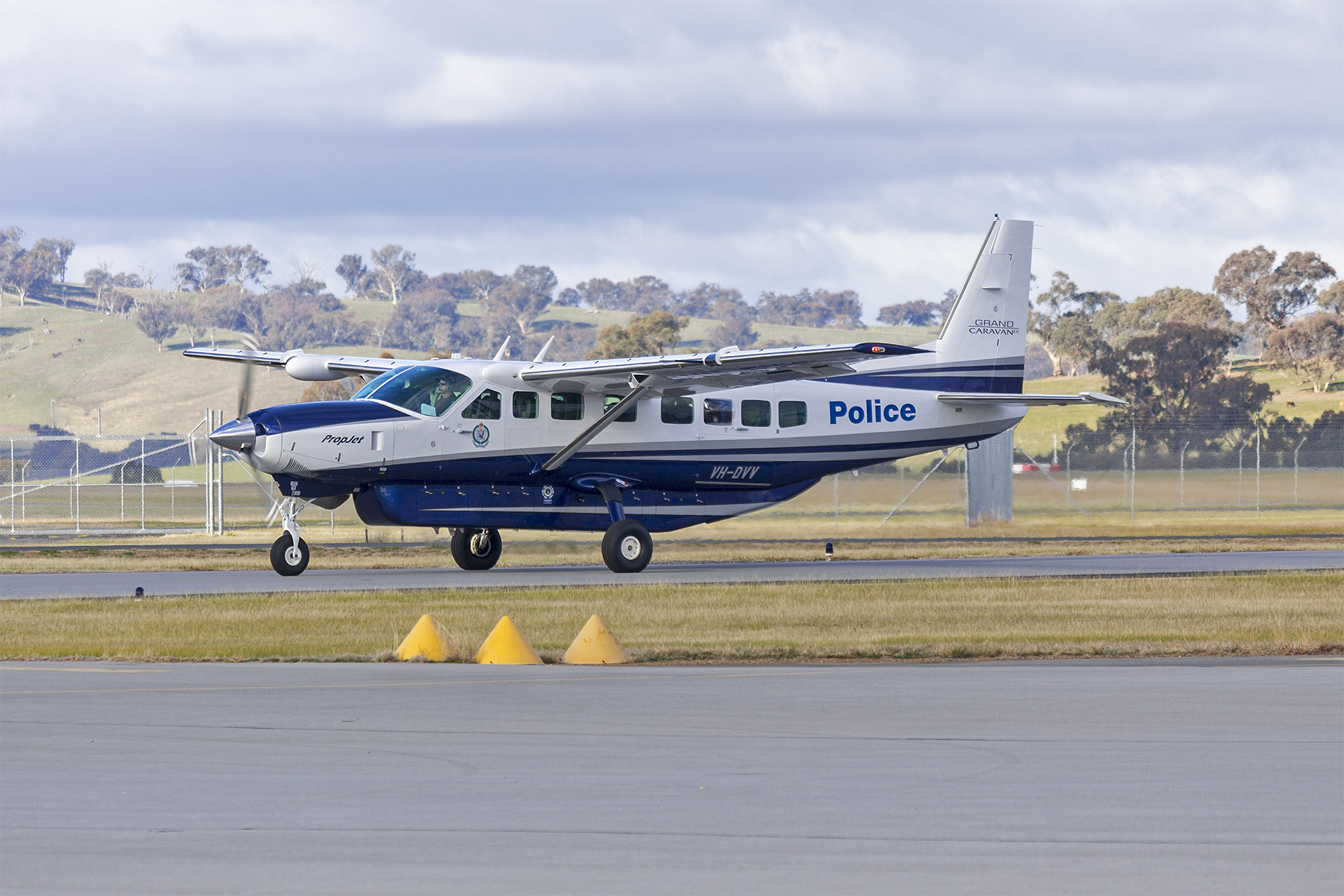
A Cessna 208 Caravan used by the New South Wales Police Force in Australia.

A police aircraft is a rotary-wing aircraft, fixed-wing aircraft, nonrigid-wing aircraft or lighter-than-air aircraft used in police operations. They are commonly used for traffic control, ground support, search and rescue, high-speed car pursuits, observation, air patrol, riot control, and police tactical unit transportation.

Police helicopters are normally equipped with variants such as night vision, FLIR, infrared, surveillance cameras, radar, special radio systems and engines, loudspeaker systems, tear gas dispensers, searchlights, winches and winch cables, flashing light beacons, police rescue equipment and special seating. Weapons are usually not attached to the aircraft.

Police forces sometimes use military surplus helicopters, such as the Bell UH-1 Huey, but most buy their helicopters directly from major aircraft companies with necessary modifications, such as appropriate radios and high-powered spotlamps.

Some police forces make use of drones and wingman suits.

== Water ==
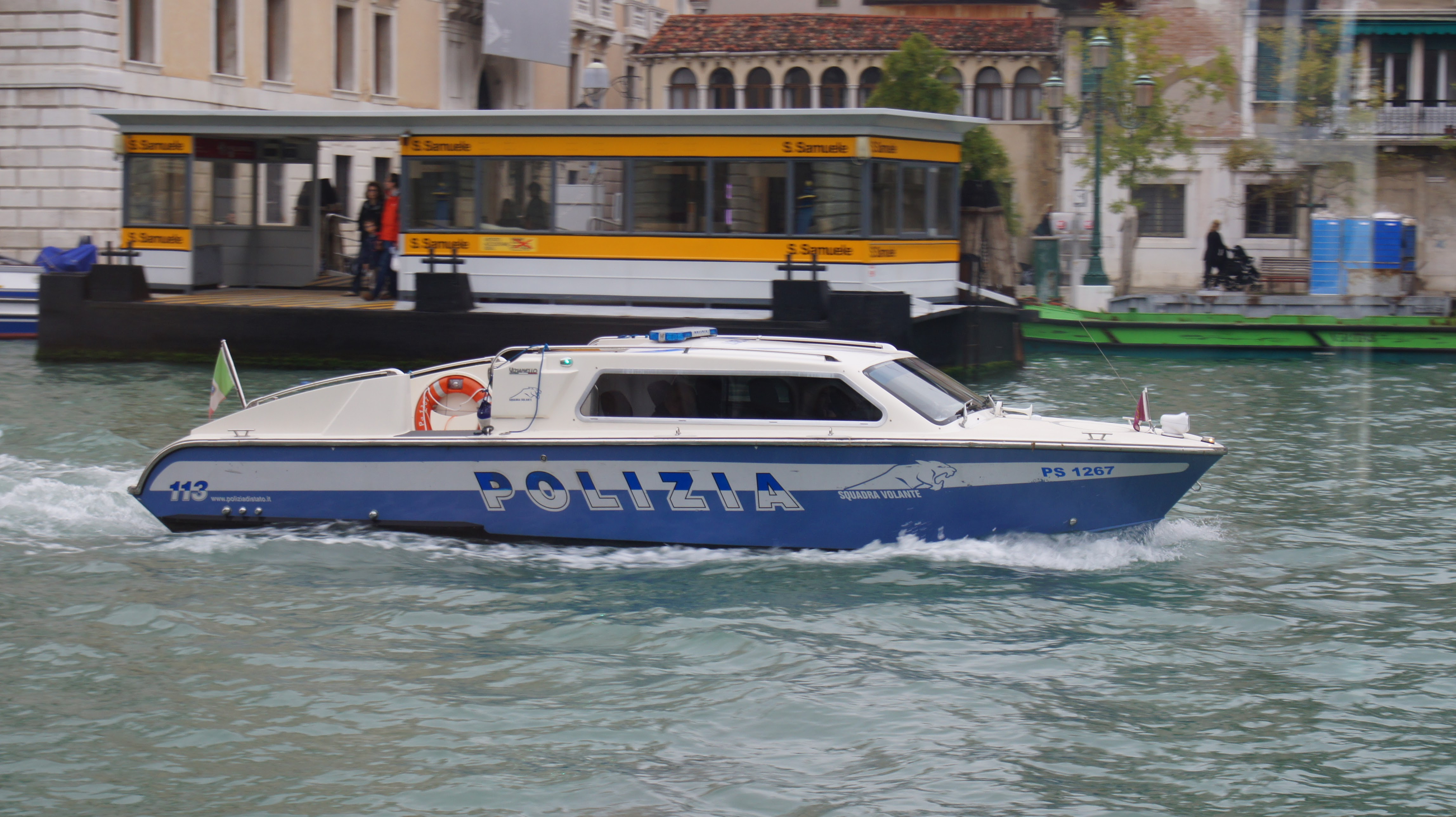
A motorboat used by the Polizia Locale of Venice

A police watercraft is usually a small or medium-sized vessel that is used by police agencies to patrol bodies of water. They are usually employed on major rivers, in enclosed harbors near cities or in places where a stronger presence than that offered by the Harbourmaster or Coast Guard is needed.

Police boats sometimes have high-performance engines in order to catch up with fleeing fugitives on the water. They have been used since the beginning of the 20th century.

In New Zealand, police vessels are designed to survive a roll over. This came after the 1986 tragedy of the Lady Elizabeth II which after 13 years of operation capsized killing two Wellington police officers, Constable Glenn Hughes and Senior Sergeant Phil Ward.

== See also ==
- SWAT vehicle
- Military police vehicle
