= Panda car =

Patrol car used by the British police

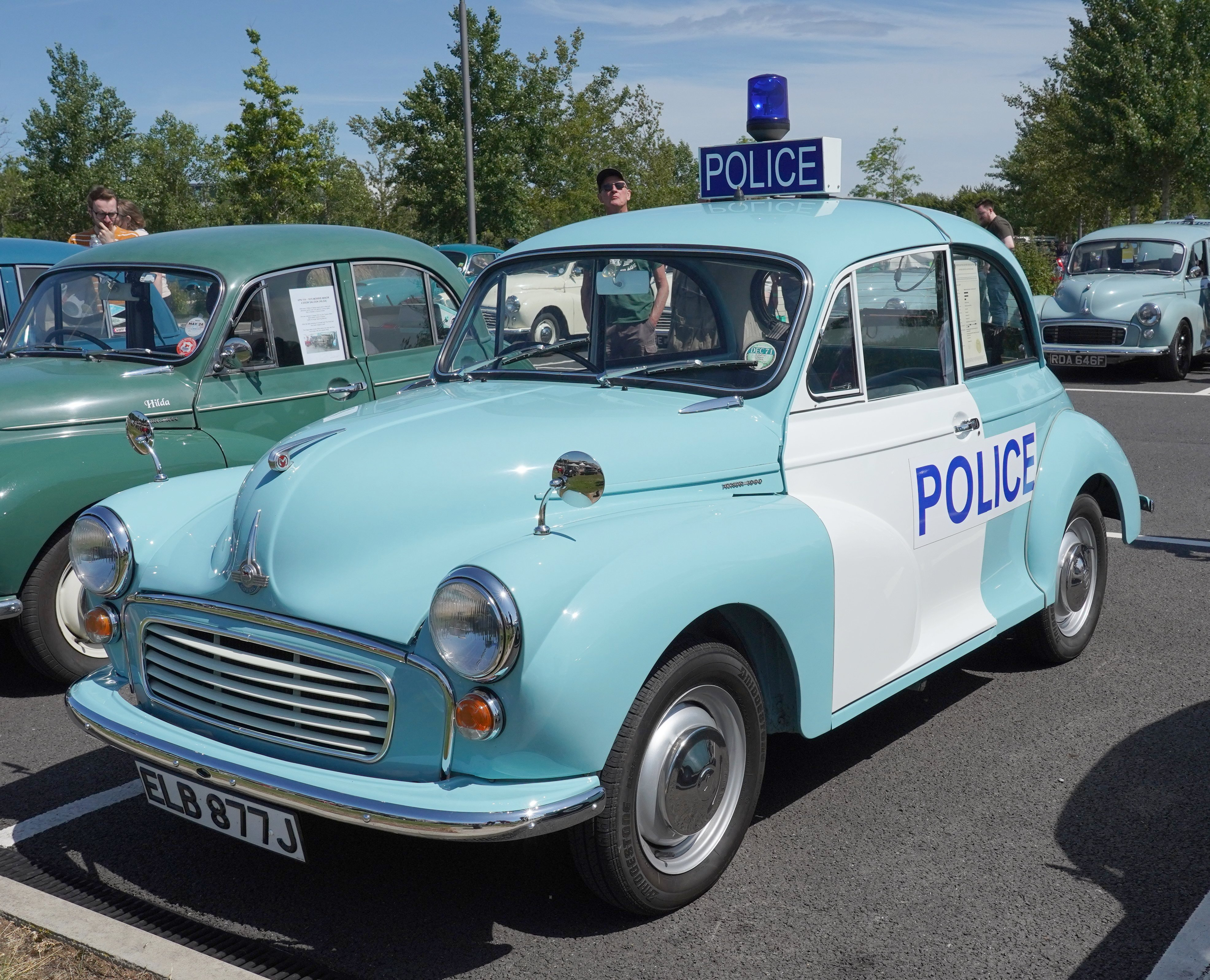
1960s Morris Minor

A panda car, or just panda, is a small- or medium-sized marked British police car.

== History of the term ==
The term 'panda car' was first used to refer to black police cars with panels that had been painted white to increase their visibility. It was later applied to blue and white police cars.

There is a record of Salford City Police using black and white Hillman Minxes in 1960.

The chief constable of the Lancashire Constabulary referred to the use of blue and white Ford Anglia panda cars in Kirkby in an article in The Times on 26 January 1966.

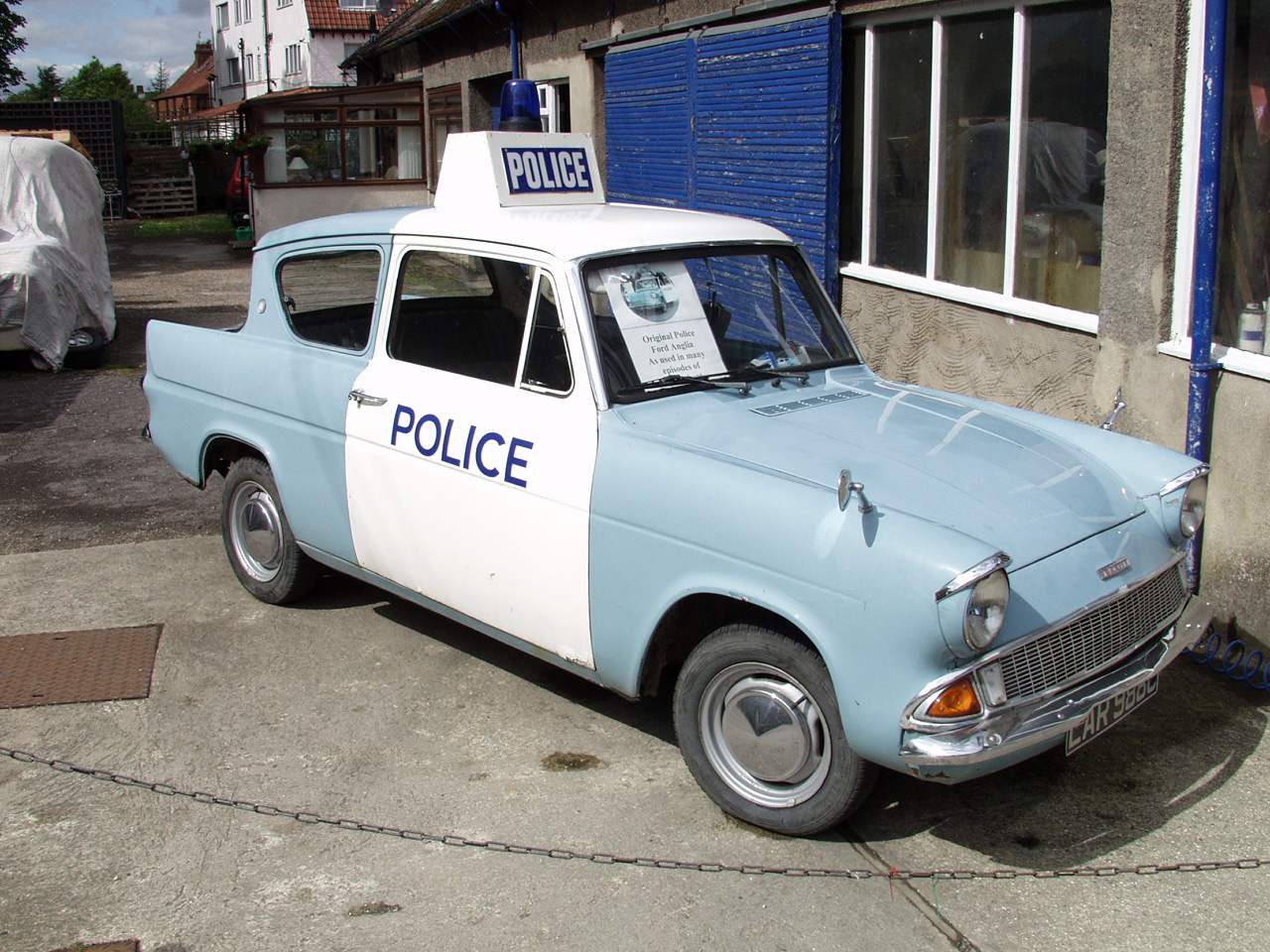
Ford Anglia panda of the 1960s

In 1967, the Dunbartonshire force bought two Hillman Imps (subsequently nicknamed Pinky and Perky) for escort duties on the A82 road; one was blue, the other white. The boot lids, bonnets and doors were then swapped to create a panda car style scheme.

In the 1980s, police cars in the United Kingdom began to be ordered in white to reduce purchase costs, usually with orange or red "jam sandwich" reflective stripes. Today, patrol cars use Battenburg markings or stripes, although many forces still use a mainly white colour scheme. The name panda car or panda is still sometimes used.

== Roles ==
In many areas, the panda car replaced the traditional "bobby on the beat", when it was seen that larger suburban or rural areas could be more effectively patrolled by officers in cars, as opposed to on foot, bicycles, or motorcycles.

The provision of shelter from the weather, and a two way radio, were also benefits.

The panda is distinct from the "area car", a larger and more powerful vehicle which acts as support to the beat constables, usually carrying two officers. Current usage within the Metropolitan Police Service uses the term "panda car" to refer specifically to a marked car driven by a basic driver (i.e., one constrained to drive within normal traffic rules, and who may not use the vehicle's siren).

This contrasts with an IRV (incident response vehicle) which could be exactly the same vehicle but driven by a response driver (i.e., one trained and permitted to disregard certain traffic laws and use the siren, as one would normally expect from police vehicles). The callsign attached to the vehicle for the duration of the shift should normally make it clear whether it is functioning as a panda or IRV at the time.

== See also ==
- Jam sandwich (police car)
- Black and white (police vehicle)
- Black Maria

== Sources ==
- Article by the chief constable of Lancashire in The Times (Mobility Answer to Police Shortage (News) Colonel T. E. St. Johnston - The Times, Wednesday, 26 January 1966; pg. 13; Issue 56539; col F)
