= Police vehicles in the United Kingdom =

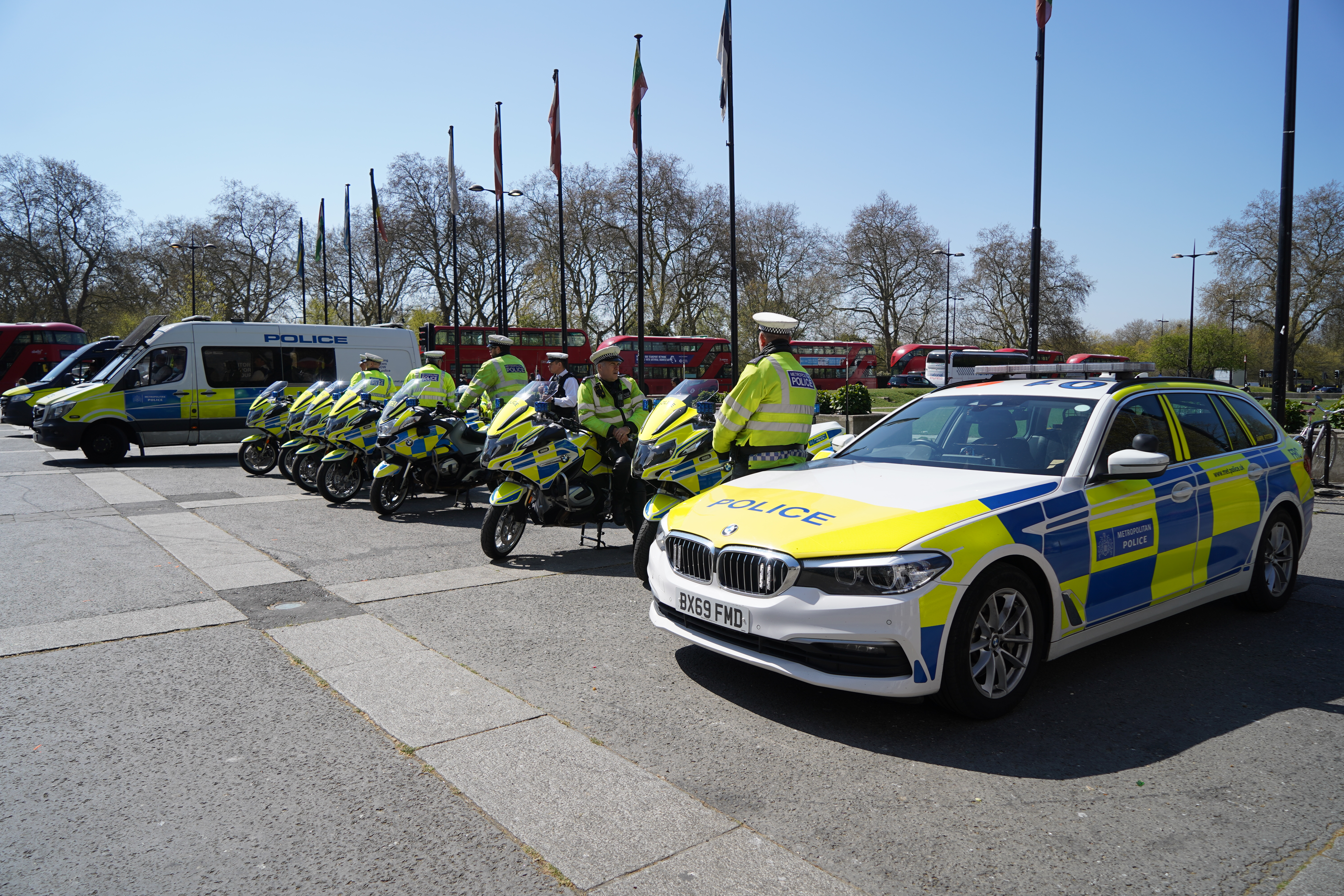
Various Metropolitan Police vehicles at Marble Arch attending a protest in London in 2021

Police in the United Kingdom use a wide range of operational vehicles, including compact cars, powerful estates and armoured police carriers. The main uses are patrol, response, tactical pursuit, and public order policing. Other vehicles used by British police include motorcycles, aircraft, and boats.

== Incident response vehicle (IRV) ==
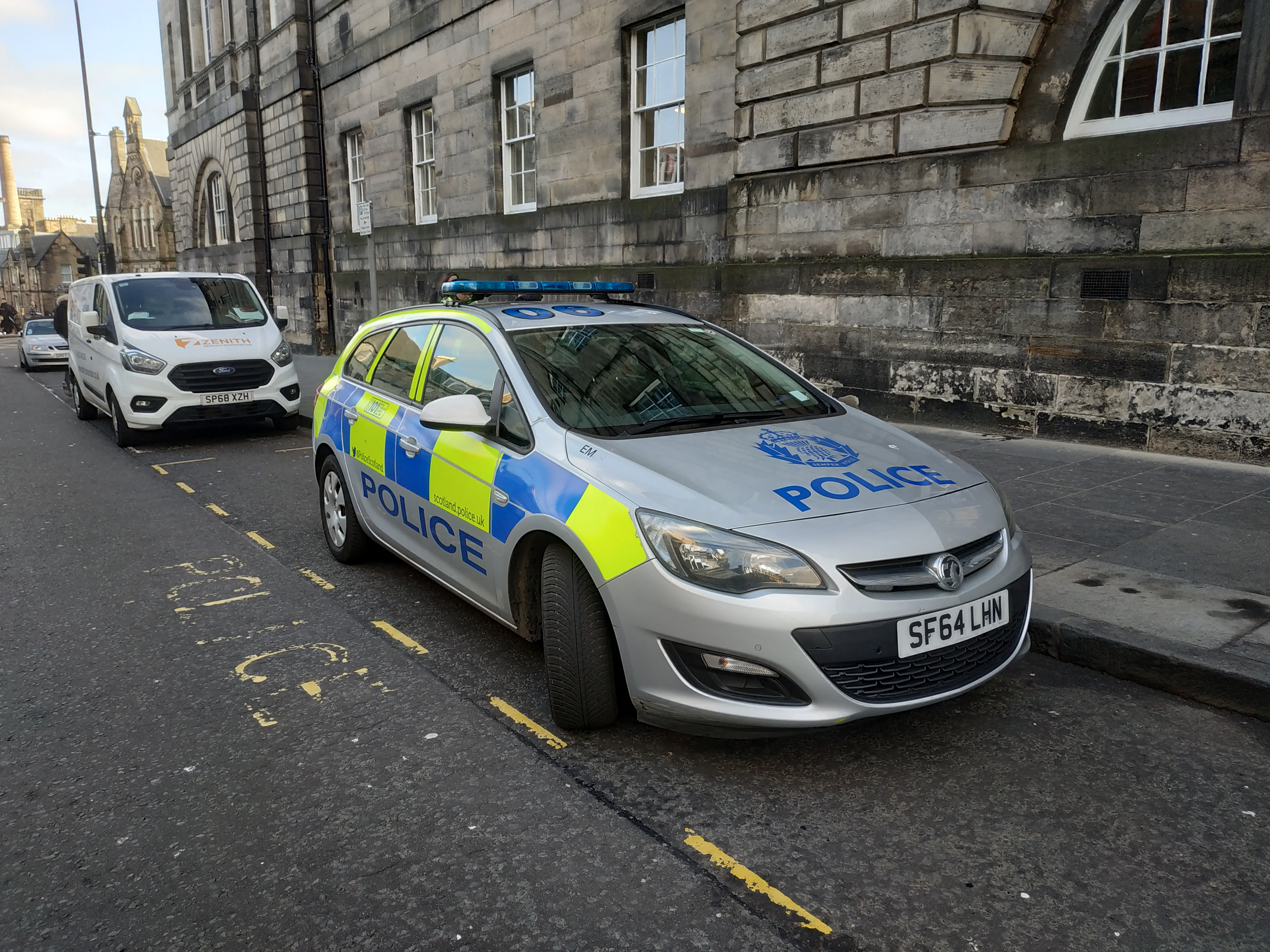
Police Scotland Vauxhall Astra Incident response vehicle in Edinburgh

Incident response vehicles (IRVs) are used by UK police to respond to emergencies and to conduct proactive patrols. They are fitted with blue lights and sirens to warn other road users and pedestrians that they need to make way for the police vehicle.

IRVs will generally carry equipment and lighting for use at traffic incidents, such as traffic cones, warning signs and basic first aid equipment. Many response cars in the UK now also carry mobile technology which can be linked to police databases and automatic number plate recognition (ANPR) technology.

== Armed response vehicle (ARV) ==
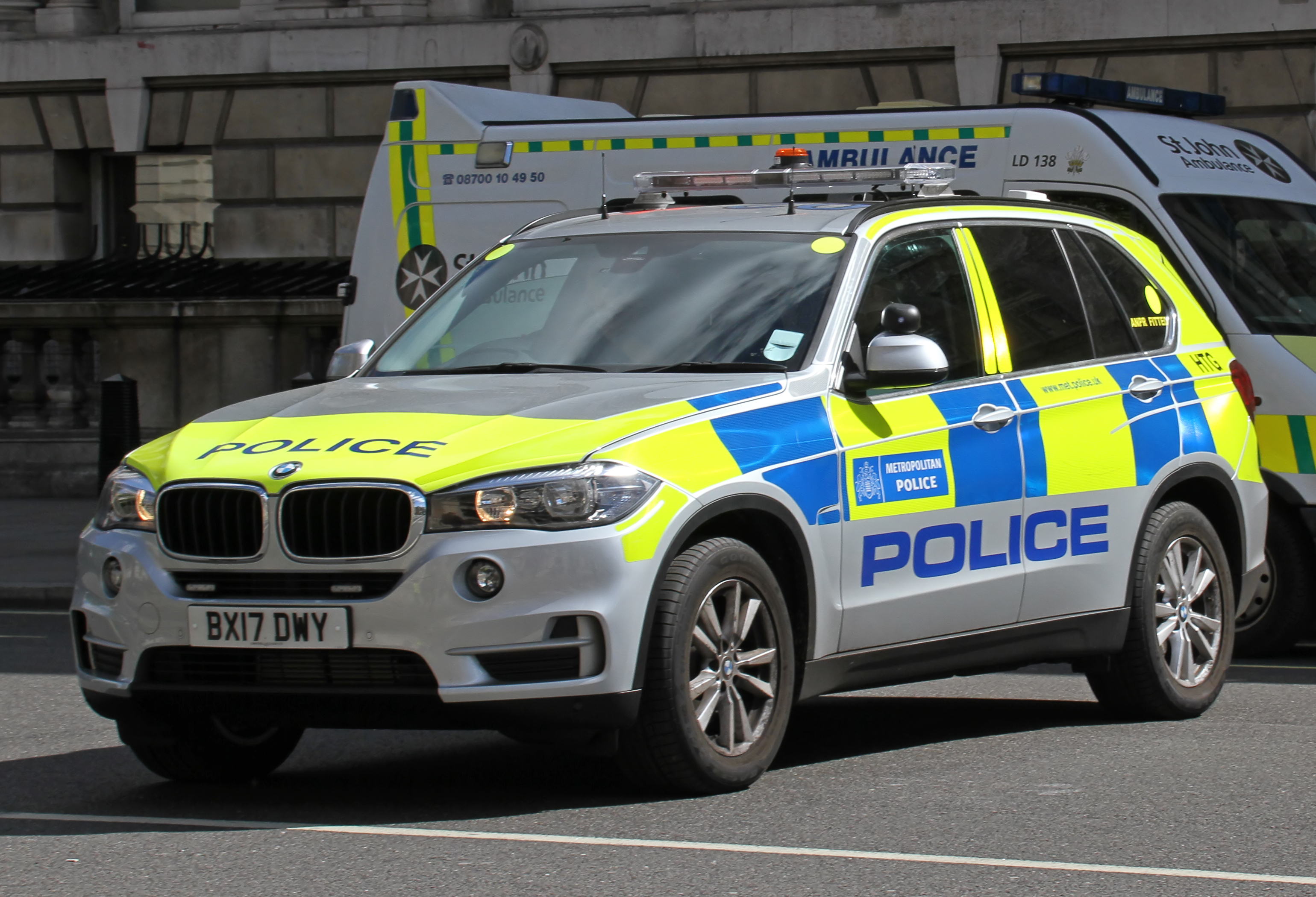
A BMW X5 ARV of the Metropolitan Police, with yellow dots indicating that it carries firearms officers

Excluding the Police Service of Northern Ireland, police officers in the United Kingdom do not typically carry firearms. There are, however, a number of armed response vehicles (ARVs) in each police force area in which authorised firearms officers are carried.

== Roads policing unit (RPU) ==
Roads policing units vehicles, also known as traffic cars, are faster police vehicles used by pursuit trained officers who are tasked responding to serious traffic collisions and conducting high speed pursuits, as well as traffic enforcement and criminals using the road to commit offences. RPU cars carry specialist equipment, such as traffic cones, road closure signs or collisions, and scene preservation equipment. These vehicles are usually fitted with ANPR to assist in traffic enforcement.

Historically, cars such as the Wolseley 4/50 & 6/80, Jaguar Mark 2, Rover P6, Rover SD1, Rover 800 and Vauxhall Senator were commonly used.

During the 1960s-70s, many police forces started buying foreign cars due to the unreliability of domestic vehicles. In 1965, Hampshire and Isle of Wight Constabulary purchased four Volvo 121 Amazons. In 1972, Thames Valley Police and Derbyshire Police bought the first BMW police cars in the UK, the BMW E3 3.0Si's, followed by West Mercia Police in 1974. Following that, many Volvo and BMW cars have been used as police cars.

Most roads policing vehicles are rated as 'high-performance', requiring traffic officers to undergo additional driving training to the 'advanced' standard. Officers are also commonly trained in Tactical Pursuit and Containment (TPAC) which is the umbrella term for pursuit tactics (e.g., HoSTyDS, boxing, static stop).

== Area car ==
Area cars sit between IRVs and RPUs. They are usually higher-performance vehicles similar to those in RPUs but operated by officers on response teams who respond to general emergency calls.

== Motorcycle ==
Motorcycles are used by a number of services; usually the road policing unit. Police motorcycles are also used in road safety initiatives such as Bikesafe, a national programme to reduce motorcycle casualties where police motorcyclists provide advanced rider training to members of the public.

Some Metropolitan Police Special Escort Group officers and Parliamentary and Diplomatic Protection also use motorcycles.

A variety of motorcycles have been used by police. The Honda ST1300 Pan-European was a popular bike, but it was withdrawn from service by most forces in 2007, following the death of a Merseyside police motorcyclist in 2005 in an accident caused by an instability in the model when outfitted with police equipment.

== Van and minibus ==
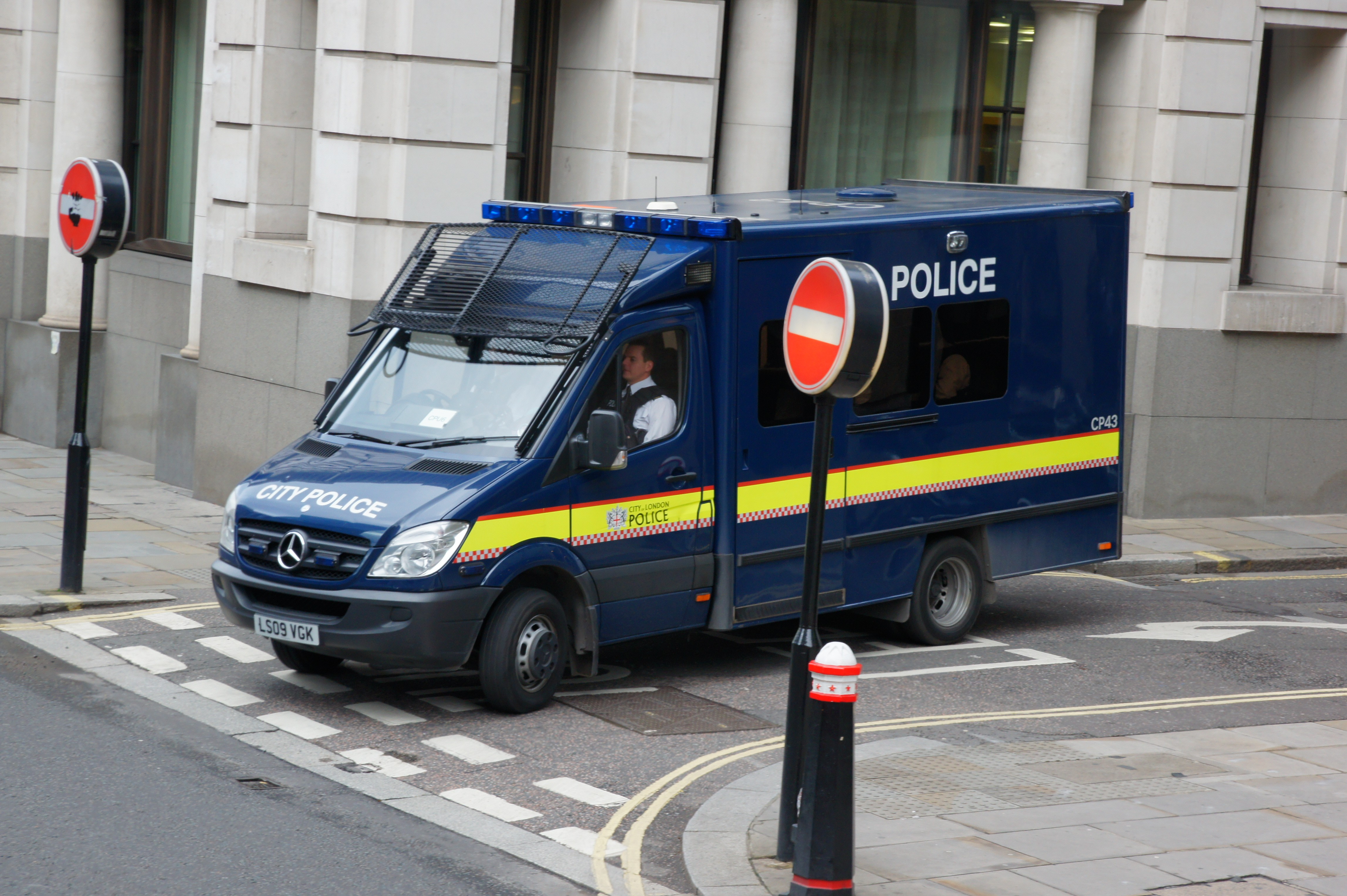
City of London Police public disorder response vehicle

Police vans are widely used across the United Kingdom and incorporate a cage to hold prisoners.

Larger vans are also used to act as mobile control rooms at major incidents and may also carry specialised equipment such as hydraulic door entry and cutting tools. Minibuses are used to carry groups of police officers, for example, for public order and major incidents, and for inner-city patrols, such as the Metropolitan Police's Territorial Support Group. The minibuses are usually fitted with riot shields to protect the windscreen from damage, or reinforced glass.

== Other vehicles ==
- Mobile forward control facility – a control room that can be deployed to the site of a critical incident
- Dog unit cars/vans
- Horse trailers
- Vehicle removal trucks
- Mobile custody units
- Bicycles
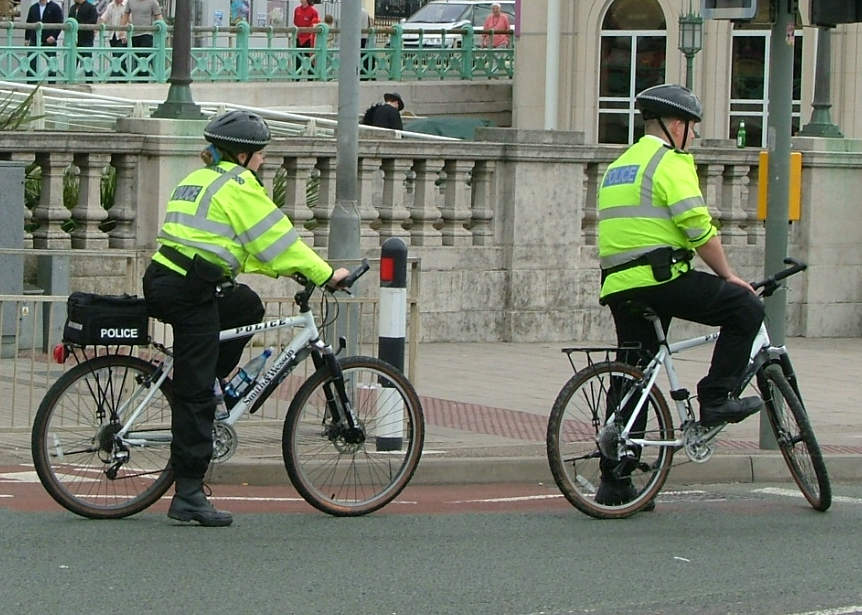
British police officers on custom Smith & Wesson bicycles in Brighton

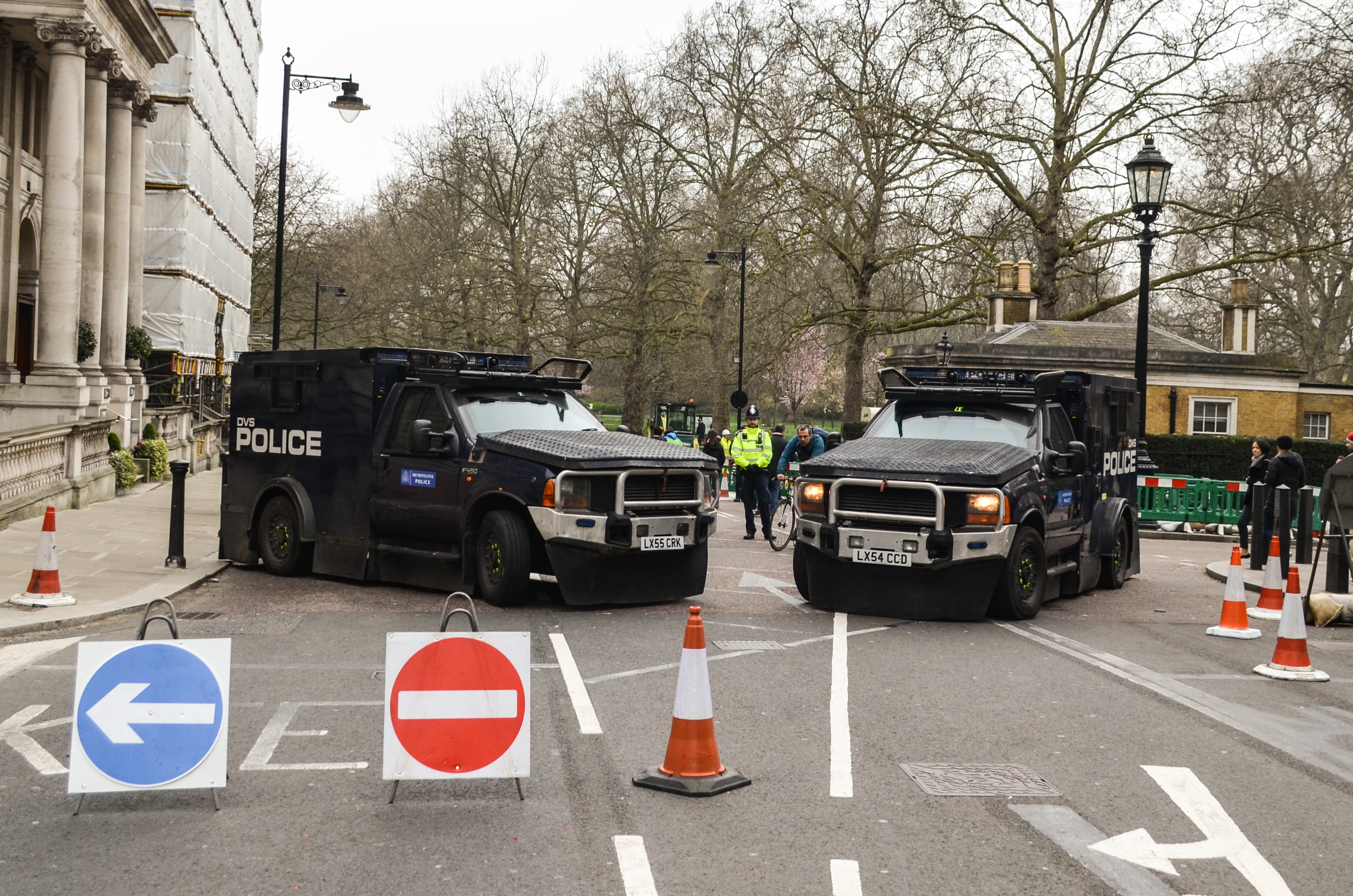
Metropolitan Police Jankel Guardians engaged on an operation. These are utilised by public order and armed officers for high-profile operations and airport patrols.

== Livery and lighting ==
UK police forces almost always use white or silver base color vehicles covered wholly or partly with the battenburg pattern of yellow and blue retroreflective chequer-squares. Police cars, vans and minibuses may have aerial roof markings that help aircraft crew identify them. These can include the unique force code, vehicle identifying mark, or police division that the vehicle belongs to.

A limited number of specialist police vehicles have different liveries and markings, examples include:

- The Metropolitan Police Parliamentary and Diplomatic Protection unit uses red vehicles with battenburg markings.
- City of London Police and Metropolitan Police public order vehicles are dark blue with custom yellow or battenburg markings.
- Some specialist armoured vehicles are khaki, black or dark blue and have low visibility markings. These are most commonly used by the Ministry of Defence Police and Civil Nuclear Constabulary.

Under the Road Vehicle Lighting Regulations 1989, police vehicles may display blue flashing lights to alert other road users to their presence or when the driver feels that the journey needs to be undertaken urgently. These lights are usually mounted on the roof and incorporated into the standard vehicle system of external lights. Most police vehicles are also fitted with a siren. In addition to blue lights, many traffic and incident response cars are fitted with flashing red lights that are only visible at the rear of the vehicle. These indicate that the vehicle is stopped or moving slowly.

== Aircraft ==
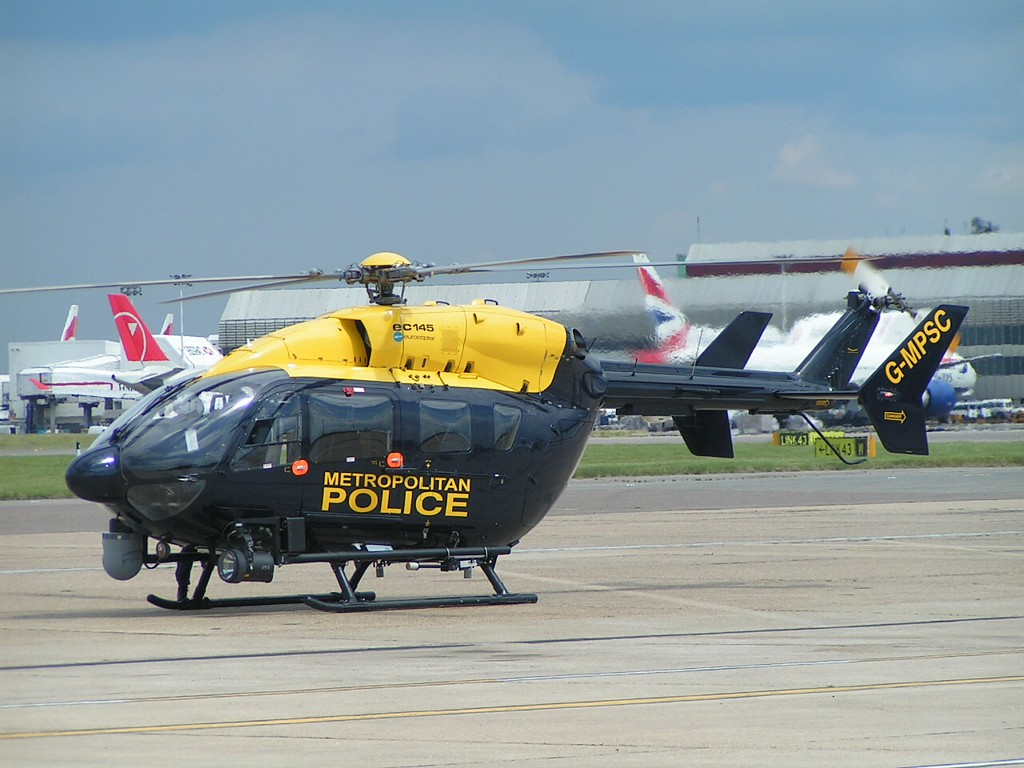
An EC145 helicopter at Heathrow Airport, now operated by the National Police Air Service

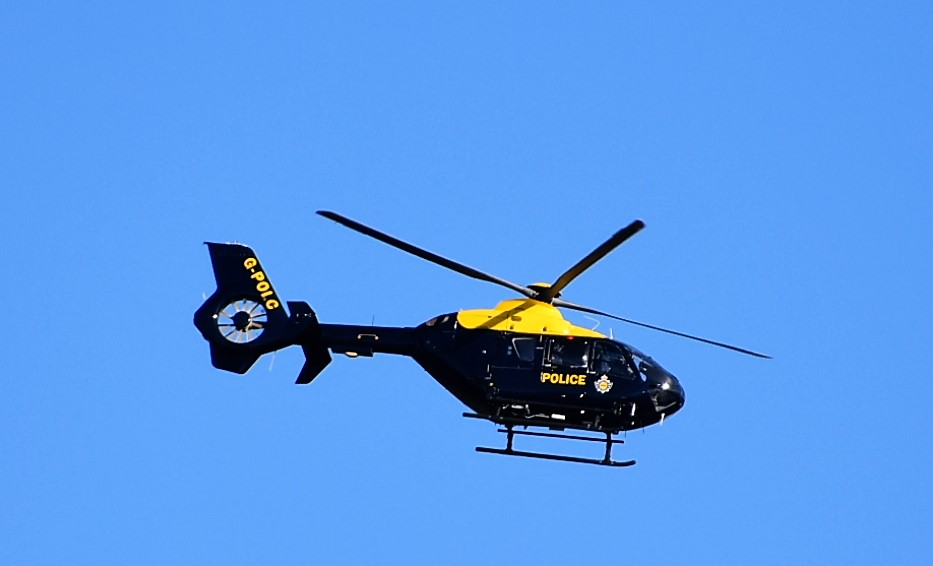
One of the National Police Air Service's EC135 aircraft, which make up the majority of their fleet. The larger EC145 aircraft are primarily reserved for use in London.

All police air support in England and Wales is provided by the National Police Air Service (NPAS). NPAS uses Eurocopter EC135 and EC145 helicopters, alongside Vulcanair P68R planes. Twin-engine aircraft are required, as air support units (ASU) are often required to fly over urban areas.

Aircraft are fitted with an array of surveillance, navigation, and communication technology to help them with a wide variety of tasks. The specific tasks that any one police helicopter performs will vary from force to force, but common deployments are for missing person searches, vehicle pursuits, the tracking of suspects, and maintaining public order.

Scotland and Northern Ireland have separate air support units. Police Scotland utilises a single EC135, whilst the Police Service of Northern Ireland operates two EC135 and one EC145 helicopters.

Police aircraft can be used for MEDEVACs, however, these are rarely performed due to the availability of HM Coastguard helicopters and charitably funded air ambulances – both of which offer enhanced medical care with the availability of a paramedic and/or doctor on board.

=== Crew ===
A single pilot civilian operates each aircraft. Most pilots operating police aircraft come from a military background – and as such have the required flying hours and experience to safely fly at low-levels and for prolonged periods of time.

The standard crew in a police helicopter consists of two tactical flight officers (TFO). A front seat observer is responsible for operating the helicopter's surveillance systems. The rear seat observer, responsible for communications using the TETRA radio and downlink systems. NPAS' P68 fixed-wing aircraft only operate with one TFO due to weight restrictions.

TFOs are sworn police officers who have extensive experience on the ground, and also carry all the equipment a normal police officer would onboard—should the aircraft be required to land to assist or make an arrest. All pilots are civilians, and have no police powers.

== Watercraft ==
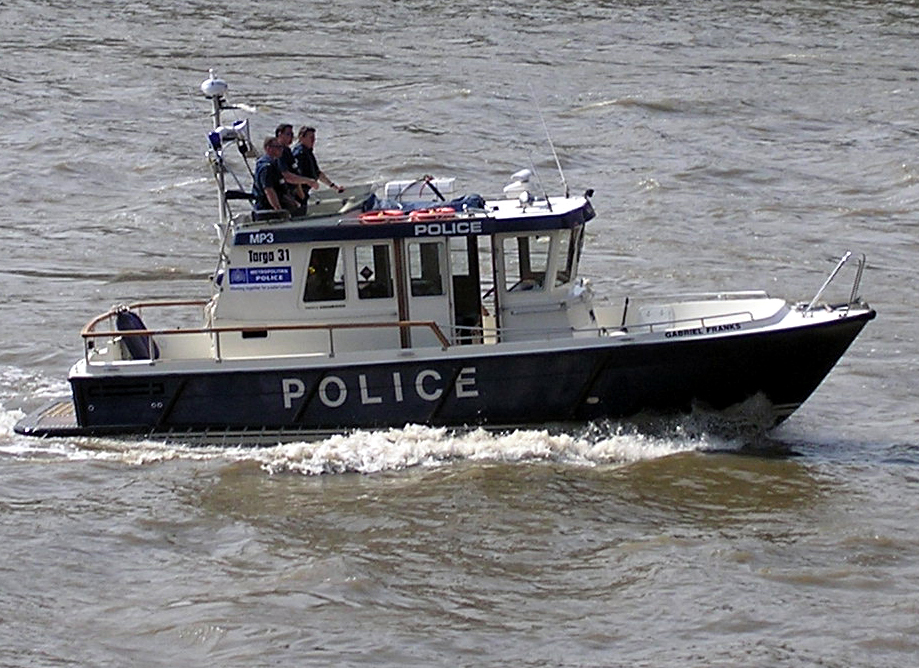
Metropolitan Police Marine Policing Unit on the River Thames

Police forces whose area includes significant waterways often include marine support units. Not only do these units police the waterways, but they also maintain a capability for waterborne rescue, usually in co-operation with HM Coastguard.

== See also ==
- Jam sandwich livery (Phased out of London Metropolitan Police Service in 2012)
