= Battenburg markings =

Markings used on emergency vehicles

A German Red Cross ambulance with orange and yellow Battenburg markings

Battenburg markings or Battenberg markings (Note: The cake was named after the Battenberg family, in turn named after the town of Battenberg. "Battenburg" with a "u" is a misspelling of the family name, but an acceptable spelling for the markings.) are a pattern of high-visibility markings developed in the United Kingdom in the 1990s, named after its similar appearance to the cross-section of a Battenberg cake.

== History ==
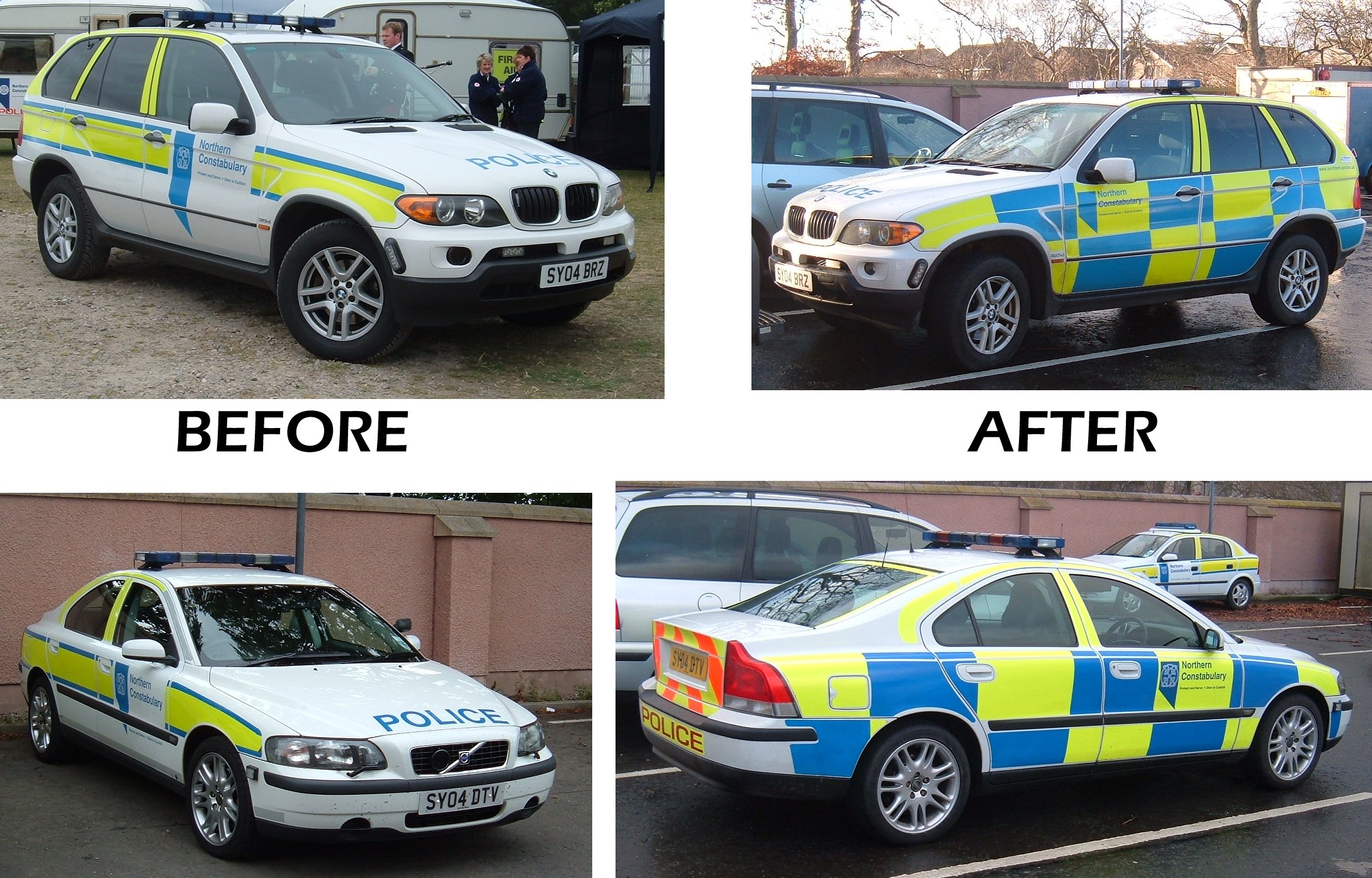
Northern Constabulary vehicles that were changed to Battenburg markings

Battenburg markings were developed in the mid-1990s in the United Kingdom by the Police Scientific Development Branch (which later became the Home Office Centre for Applied Science and Technology) at the request of the national motorway policing sub-committee of the Association of Chief Police Officers. The brief was to design a livery for motorway and trunk road police vehicles that would maximise the vehicles' visibility, from a distance of up to 500 metres (1,600 ft), when stopped either in daylight or under headlights, and which distinctively marked them as police vehicles.

The primary objectives were to design markings that:

- Made officers and vehicles more conspicuous (e.g. to prevent collisions when stopped)
- Made police vehicles recognisable at a distance of up to 500 metres (1,600 ft) in daylight
- Assisted in high-visibility policing for public reassurance and deterrence of traffic violations
- Made police vehicles nationally recognisable
- Were an equal-cost option compared to existing markings
- Were acceptable to at least 75% of the staff

== Conspicuity ==
Ambulance in Czech Republic with green and yellow Battenburg markings

Battenburg design uses a regular pattern and the contrast between a light and a dark colour to increase conspicuity for the human eye. The lighter colour is daylight-fluorescent (such as fluorescent-yellow) for better visibility in daytime, dusk and dawn. For night-time visibility, the complete pattern is retroreflective.

The Battenburg design typically has two rows of alternating rectangles, usually starting with yellow at the top corner, then the alternating colour, along the sides of a vehicle. Most cars use two block rows in the design (so-called full-Battenburg scheme). Some car designs use a single row (so-called half-Battenburg scheme) or one and a half rows.

Unless precautions are taken, pattern markings can have a camouflage effect, concealing a vehicle's outline, particularly in front of a cluttered background. With Battenburg markings, this can be avoided by:

- Making rectangles large enough for optical resolution from distance—at least 600 × 300 mm. A typical car pattern consists of seven blocks along the vehicle side. (An odd number of blocks also allows both top corner blocks to be the same fluorescent colour.)
- Clearly marking cars' outlines in fluorescent colour along the roof pillars
- Avoiding designs with more than two block rows (even for higher vehicles) by including a large area of plain or daylight-fluorescent colour.
- Avoiding hybrid designs of Battenburg markings and other high-visibility patterns or check patterns.

The Battenburg livery is not used on the rear of vehicles; upward-facing chevrons of yellow and red are most commonly used there.

=== Sillitoe tartan ===
Australian police Holden Commodore with Sillitoe tartan

In the development of Battenburg markings, one of the key goals was to clearly identify vehicles associated with police. In this regard, the pattern was reminiscent of the Sillitoe tartan black-and-white or blue-and-white chequered markings first introduced by the City of Glasgow Police in the 1930s, which were subsequently adopted as a symbol of police services throughout the United Kingdom; they are also used by the Chicago Police Department in the United States, in Australia, and on the New Zealand Police uniform.

Many police services have since phased out the Sillitoe tartan markings on vehicle liveries as they are not highly visible, replacing them with Battenburg markings.

== Safety ==
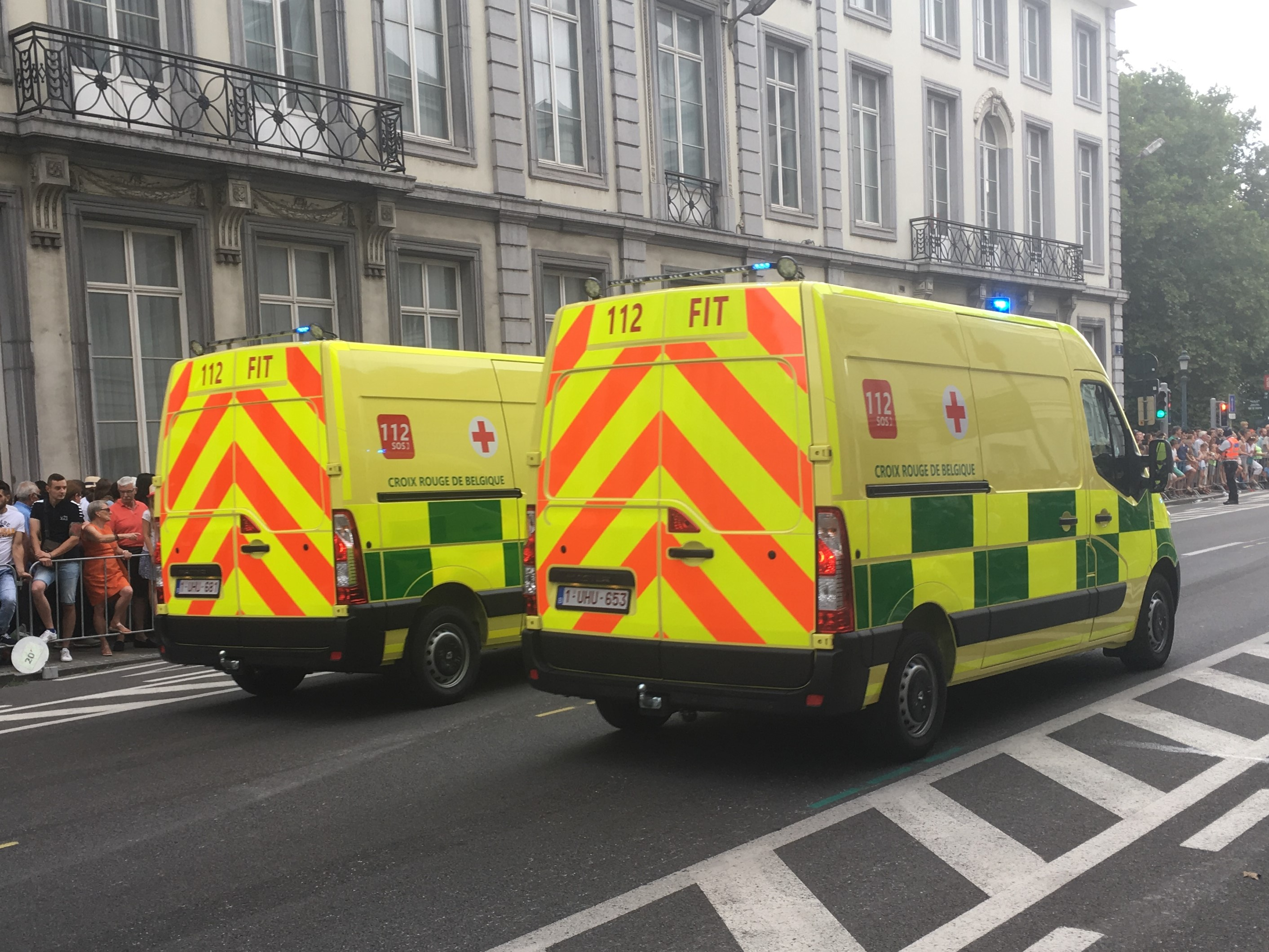
Belgian Red Cross ambulances with yellow-and-green Battenburg markings on the side and chevrons on the rear

Battenburg side markings and chevron front-and-rear markings provide conspicuity for emergency vehicles, helping to reduce accidents, especially when they are in unusual traffic situations—e.g. stopped in fast-moving traffic, or moving at different speeds or in different directions.

Several criticisms of the Battenburg scheme were stated at the 3rd Annual US Emergency Medical Services (EMS) Safety Summit in October 2010 about their use on ambulances, including:

- The difficulty of applying them to small, curved, and oddly shaped surfaces
- The high costs of adopting the markings
- The confusing pattern caused when several parked Battenburg vehicles visually overlap
- Obscuring the vehicle's shapes against complex backgrounds, or with open doors and hatches
- Combinations other than police yellow-and-blue being less effective, and sometimes even making emergency personnel harder to see
- Confronting the public with unfamiliar markings

The pattern's use by services other than UK police, and in other countries, was also criticised.

The high-visibility chevrons often used on the rear and front of Battenburg-marked vehicles, "through popular opinion rather than by a scientific process of testing and research", were found ineffective at reducing rear-end collisions. Stationary vehicles on high-speed roads were likely to be noticed, but not the fact that they were stopped. Parking at an angle was found a far more effective way of indicating the vehicles were stopped.

== Usage by country ==
=== Australia ===
Fire and Rescue New South Wales

There are few examples of Battenburg markings being used in Australia. The majority of Australian emergency services utilise the similar Sillitoe tartan markings instead.

=== Belgium ===
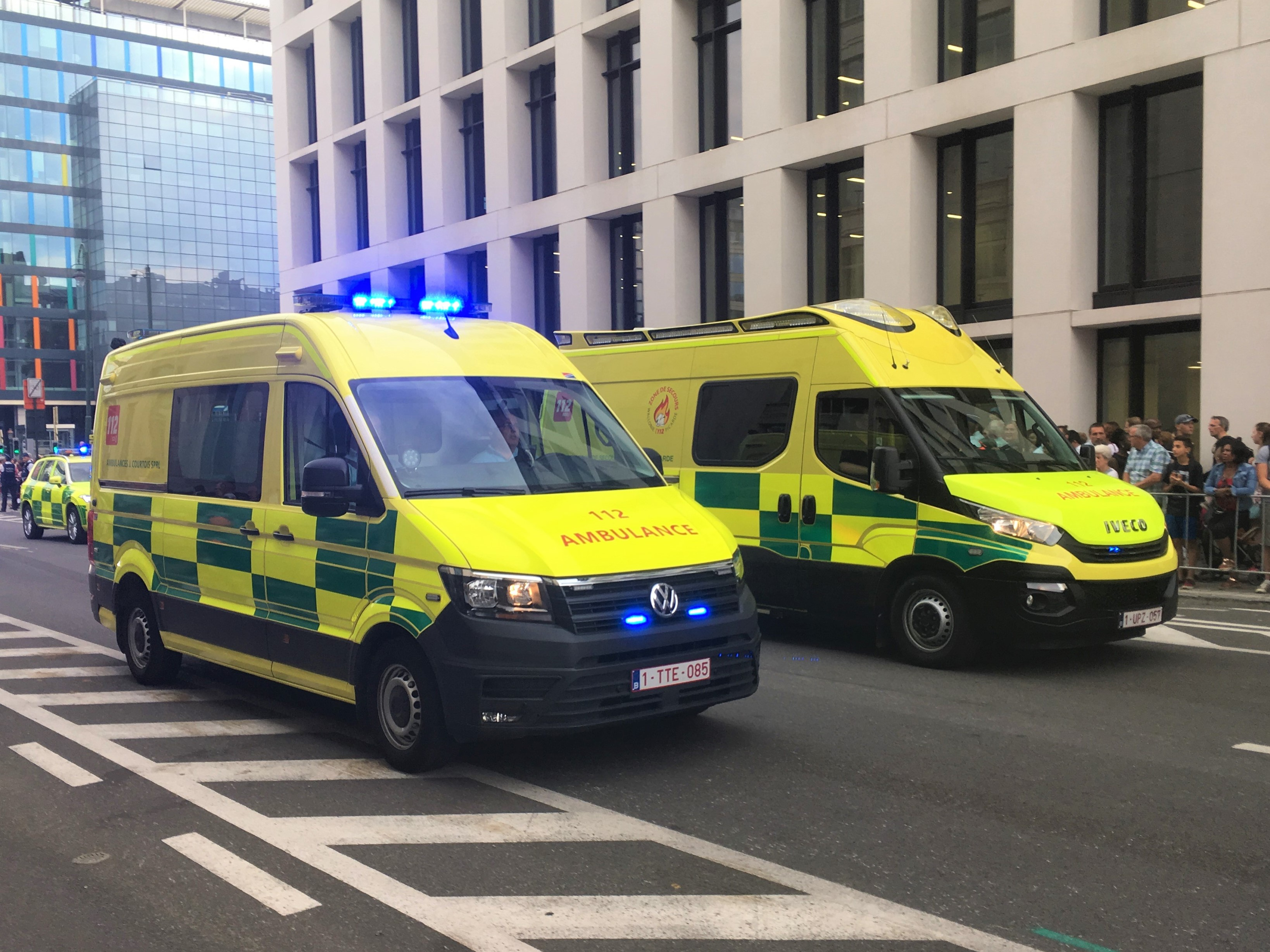
Ambulances in Belgium, 2018

In response to the terrorist attacks on 13 November 2015 in Paris and 22 March 2016 in Brussels, the Belgian federal government conducted an analysis on the functioning of the emergency services during terrorist attacks. The main issue identified regarding the emergency medical services was that their recognizability (of both vehicles and personnel) had to improve, so that emergency workers would be able to identify qualified medical providers more quickly during an intervention.

An agreement was made between the federal government and the communities and regions to implement the same new vehicle markings and uniforms. Specifically, emergency ambulances and response vehicles would keep the yellow base colour, whilst non-emergency ambulances would get a white base colour. Both types of vehicles would be marked with retroreflective yellow-and-green Battenburg markings, similar to British ambulances.

A new uniform for medical personnel was also introduced, with different colours for the Star of Life for the different types of workers.

Aside from medical vehicles, some new fire brigade, Civil Protection and highway services vehicles also use respectively yellow-and-red, blue-and-orange and yellow-and-black Battenburg markings.

=== Canada ===
In Canada, Battenburg markings on law enforcement vehicles are uncommon. However, in recent decades, Canada has slowly integrated some Battenburg markings on EMS vehicles, particularly in Ontario and Quebec.

==== Ontario ====
The parts of Ontario that utilize Battenburg markings, which are generally used by EMS vehicles, include the Region of Niagara, Greater Sudbury, Peterborough, Lanark County, and Frontenac County.

Battenburg markings on police vehicles are not a common sight. The first regional police service to ever officially use Battenburg markings on its vehicles was the St. Thomas Police Service when it tested its new police interceptors with Battenburg markings, which were inspired by the UK's Battenburg design with the familiar blue and yellow reflective markings, in order to help enhance visibility within the city.

The Barrie Police Service later took a similar approach to redesigning its vehicle wraps, which was announced on 26 July 2022, when it unveiled a half-Battenburg marked police cruiser as part of a pilot project to evaluate its visibility within the community. This design featured the same blue and yellow reflective markings as those seen on many European police cars. As of 12 May 2023, the Barrie Police Service has officially adopted half-Battenburg markings on all of their fleets, eliminating stealthy dark navy body-colored vehicles and replacing them with white instead.

During the autumn of 2023, the Cobourg Police Service (CPS) announced it would be the third police service in Canada to adopt Battenburg markings. A high-visibility Ford Explorer police vehicle with the markings is to be used by the service as part of a pilot project for 24 months.

=== China ===
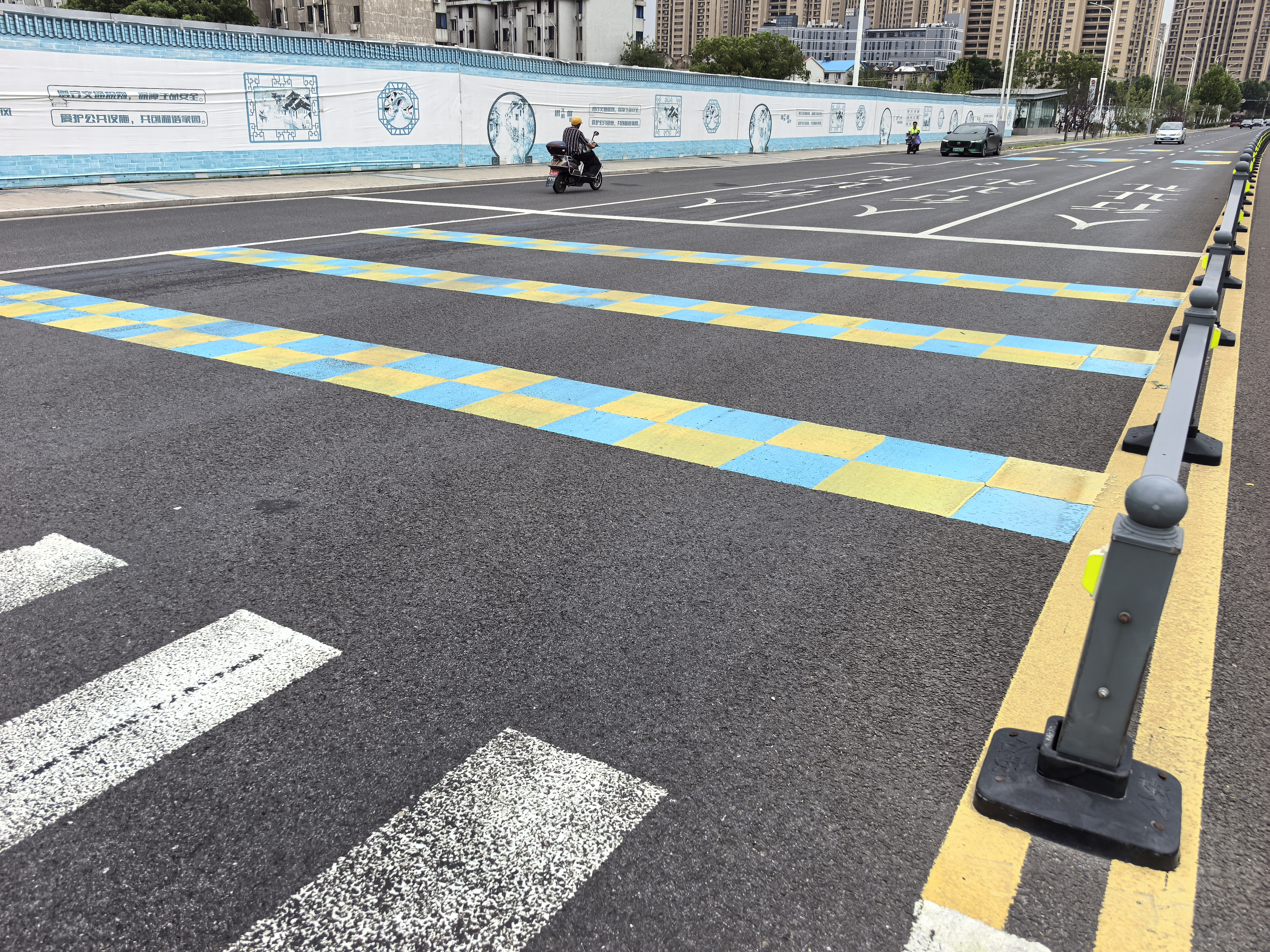
Battenburg markings as road surface marking in Jiangyin

Some police departments in Mainland China use Battenburg markings on their police motorcycles, but there is no unified standard on the usage of Battenburg markings.

Battenburg markings are also used as surface markings on some roads in Wuxi, Jiangsu. These markings are set in front of the pedestrian crossing, which improves road safety along with other markings.

=== Denmark ===
Danish emergency vehicles can have one of two options: a series of diagonal lines, or a Battenburg pattern. The diagonal lines must be either red-and-white or red-and-yellow at an angle of 45° ± 5° and have a width of 100 mm ± 2,5 mm. In the front and rear of the vehicle, the markings must be made symmetrical in a way that traffic is lead around the vehicle.

=== France ===
In 2026, the French Society of Emergency Medicine published an article in the French Annals of Emergency Medicine calling for a national design standard for doctor-led SMUR ambulances across France, highlighting that the various standards that had been published up to that point were conflicting, out-of-date, and poorly adhered to; the article, amongst other recommendations such as requiring a base colour of luminous yellow, recommended the adoption of yellow and green Battenburg markings in common with other European nations. These recommendations were accepted, and the same year the regulations were changed to require Battenburg markings on all SMUR ambulances.

=== Germany ===
All rescue vehicles in Bavaria which have been procured uniformly since 2017 have a foiling in the Battenburg marker. From 2019 the ambulance service in Schleswig-Holstein started to adopt the design.

=== Iceland ===
In 2018 the Icelandic police started marking new police cars with blue and neon yellow markings similar to Battenburg markings used in Europe. Since then the police cars in the capital region have been made even more visible. In 2020 were Icelandic ambulances changed to look more like ambulances in Europe, adopting yellow and green markings. Icelandic Search and Rescue started adopting Battenburg markings in 2016 with red and yellow markings similar to the fire services.

=== Ireland ===
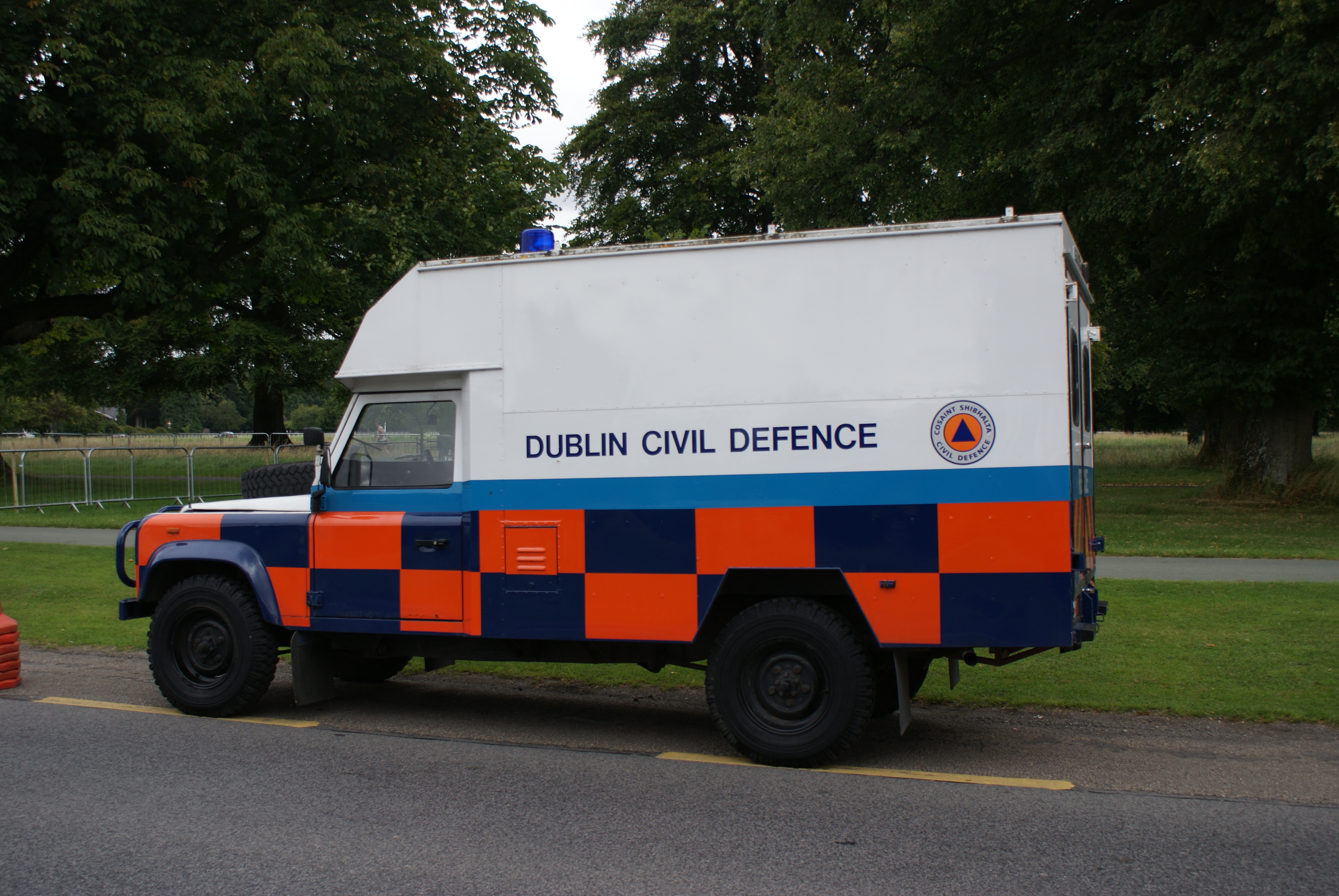
A Dublin Civil Defence Land Rover Defender field ambulance with blue and orange Battenburg markings

Ireland's Garda Síochána first introduced blue and yellow Battenburg style markings in 2004 with the formation of the Garda Traffic Corps. This rollout was expanded in 2008 with the formation of Regional Support Units (later renamed to the Garda Armed Support Unit), equipped with Battenburg liveried Volvo XC70s with removable red "ARMED SUPPORT UNIT" lettering; this livery was changed in 2016 with the purchase of new Audi Q7 SUVs and BMW 3 Series estates to include permanent lettering and a red stripe running along both sides of the vehicle. Battenburg markings would be rolled out onto most new Garda vehicles (excluding vans) regardless of their role from 2021 onwards.

Several ambulance services across Ireland use Battenburg markings on their vehicles. The Civil Defence and National Ambulance Service use green and yellow markings, the Irish Red Cross primarily use blue and red markings, and the Order of Malta Ambulance Corps use red and yellow markings on newer vehicles.

The Irish Coast Guard use orange and yellow Battenburg markings on their fleet of land vehicles. All Irish Fire Services use yellow and red Battenburg markings on their vehicles.

=== Malta ===
Malta's first emergency vehicles with Battenburg style markings, 11 Fiat Ducatos for Mater Dei Hospital, were delivered between 2012 and 2014. Further ambulances supplied new or as second-hand imports from the United Kingdom would be liveried in Battenburg markings.

The Civil Protection Department took delivery of its first fire appliances, Iveco, MAN and Volvo based appliances, with an orange and yellow Battenburg-like scheme between 2018 and 2019, with some specialist appliances later built by UK-based EmergencyOne being liveried in UK-style yellow and red markings. However, from 2021, a new livery was introduced for new Civil Protection Department fire appliances in 2021 that retained the yellow/orange and red colour scheme but disposed of the Battenburg pattern.

The Malta Police Force first began rolling out Battenburg style markings in 2021 amid investments in new fleet vehicles in line with the force's Transformation Strategy 2020–2025, replacing a silver/grey and black livery. The first new vehicles delivered in the new livery were 20 new Hyundai Tucsons for use as Rapid Intervention Units. The rollout continued in 2022 with the delivery of 12 SsangYong Mussos marked in the livery for use in rural areas, followed in 2024 with deliveries of new traffic police BMW motorcycles and MG5 electric neighbourhood police cars.

=== New Zealand ===
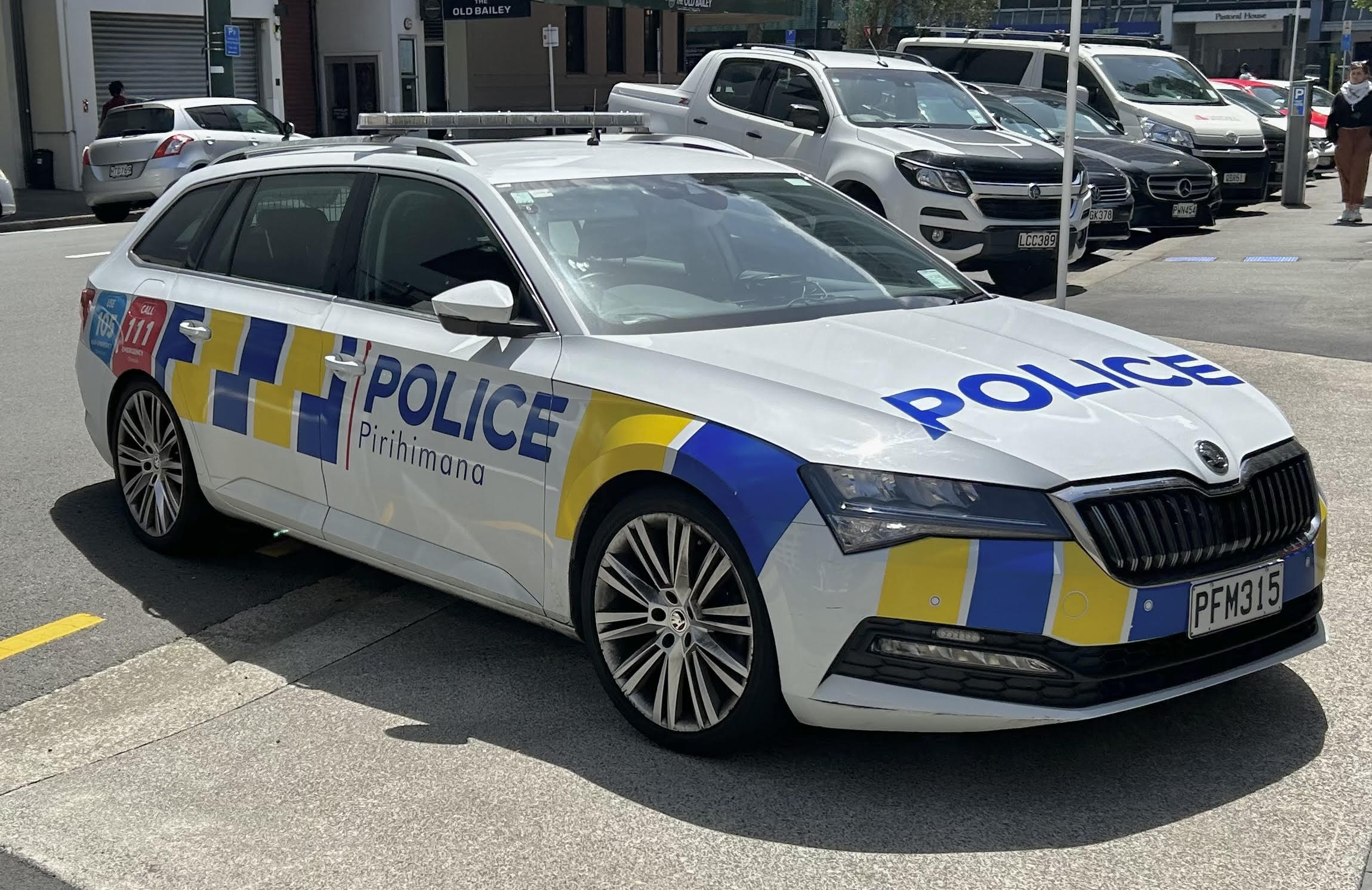
A New Zealand Police Skoda Superb with Battenburg markings parked outside Wellington District Court

In New Zealand Battenburg markings are commonly used on emergency vehicles with the New Zealand Police, Fire and Emergency New Zealand and both public ambulance services using reflective Battenburg markings on their liveries. The Joint Military Police Unit, New Zealand Defence Force fire services, private ambulances and other smaller emergency services also sometimes use Battenburg markings.

The New Zealand Police use a reflective chequered yellow-and-blue Battenburg markings on their frontline liveried vehicles. The markings used by police are a different form of Battenburg to those seen in the United Kingdom being two line checkered with breaks instead of the conventional alternating rectangles. Police started to use Battenburg markings in 2000, however the markings were exclusively for Highway Patrol vehicles with other frontline vehicles adopting Battenburg markings in 2004.

Wellington Free Ambulance was the first ambulance service in New Zealand to adopt Battenburg marking doing so in 2005. Vehicles in Wellington Free Ambulance fleet are marked with two line reflective green-and-white Battenburg markings similar to those used in the United Kingdom. Hato Hone St John followed suit in 2014 adopting Battenburg markings on new vehicles. When Hato Hone St John introduced Battenburg markings, they used conventional two line green-and-yellow alternating rectangles. However in 2023 Hato Hone St John updated their livery with a new, adapted, highly visible, reflective green-and-yellow single line Battenburg marking livery with chevrons and special Māori cultural designs integrated.

Upon the establishment of Fire and Emergency New Zealand on 1 July 2017 the organisation has used Battenburg markings on all new vehicles with many older vehicles retrospectively receiving the new livery. The Battenburg markings on Fire and Emergency vehicles are similar to the conventional two line red-and-yellow alternating rectangles used by fire services across the world, but has some subtle differences. For example the Battenburg markings are angled at 10 degrees and has Fire and Emergency branding prominently incorporated into the Battenburg markings, which expand to three lines on the cab for trucks and expand to three lines on the doors for utes to allow space for branding.

=== South Korea ===
All emergency vehicles used by National Fire Agency (South Korea), which also operates ambulance services, are required to have a high-reflective film in yellow and red by the agency vehicle livery standards, and the standard livery for firefighting vehicles includes a diagonal variation of Battenburg pattern.

=== Spain ===
Though many municipal police forces of the Autonomous communities of Spain, such as Castile and León, Catalonia, Galicia and the Basque Country, have adopted standardised liveries, some autonomous communities give their municipal police greater freedom to choose their vehicle liveries. As a result, municipal police forces of Alcobendas, Alcorcón, Colmenar Viejo and Rivas-Vaciamadrid in the Community of Madrid, the city of Seville, Benacazón and Paradas in the Province of Seville, Algeciras in Andalusía, and Barañáin in Navarre have adopted either blue-and-yellow Battenburg-style markings or a livery based on the markings.

=== Sweden ===
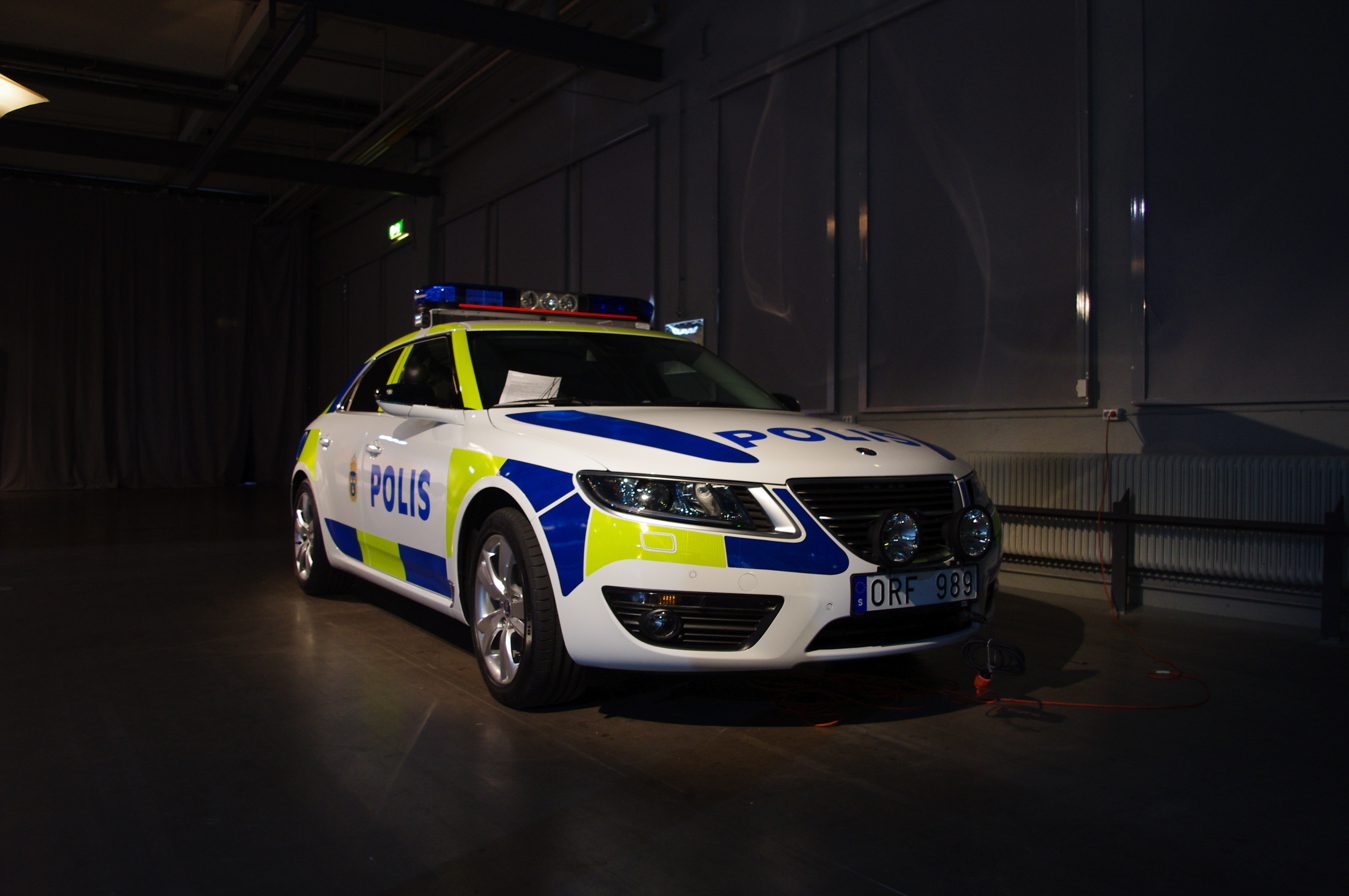
Saab 9-5 (2011)

Originally Swedish Police vehicles were painted with black roofs and doors or black roofs, bonnet, and boot. During the 1980s the cars became white with the word Polis written on the side. Later the livery became simply blue and white. In 2005 they began using a light blue and fluorescent yellow Battenburg livery. Swedish police cars have been Saabs, Volvos or Volkswagens, with the same livery all over Sweden. Many Swedish road agencies, contractors and consultants use Battenburg markings on road maintenance vehicles, with an orange-and-blue colour scheme, as in the UK rail response type shown above. This practice was established after a study in 2008 by the Swedish Road Administration, which showed a significant traffic calming effect when using orange-and-blue Battenburg marking to improve the visibility of road maintenance vehicles.

=== Taiwan ===
Taipei City Fire Department ambulances began using yellow and red Battenburg markings beginning in March 2020; Taoyuan City Fire Department ambulances followed shortly after in late 2021. By 2025, all ambulances in Taipei were expected to display Battenburg markings. All ambulances across Taiwan are expected to use Battenburg markings as equipment is replaced, with the Taipei City government noting that the markings are in accordance with the Reflective Markings Format for Fire Fighting Vehicles of the National Fire Agency.

=== United Kingdom ===
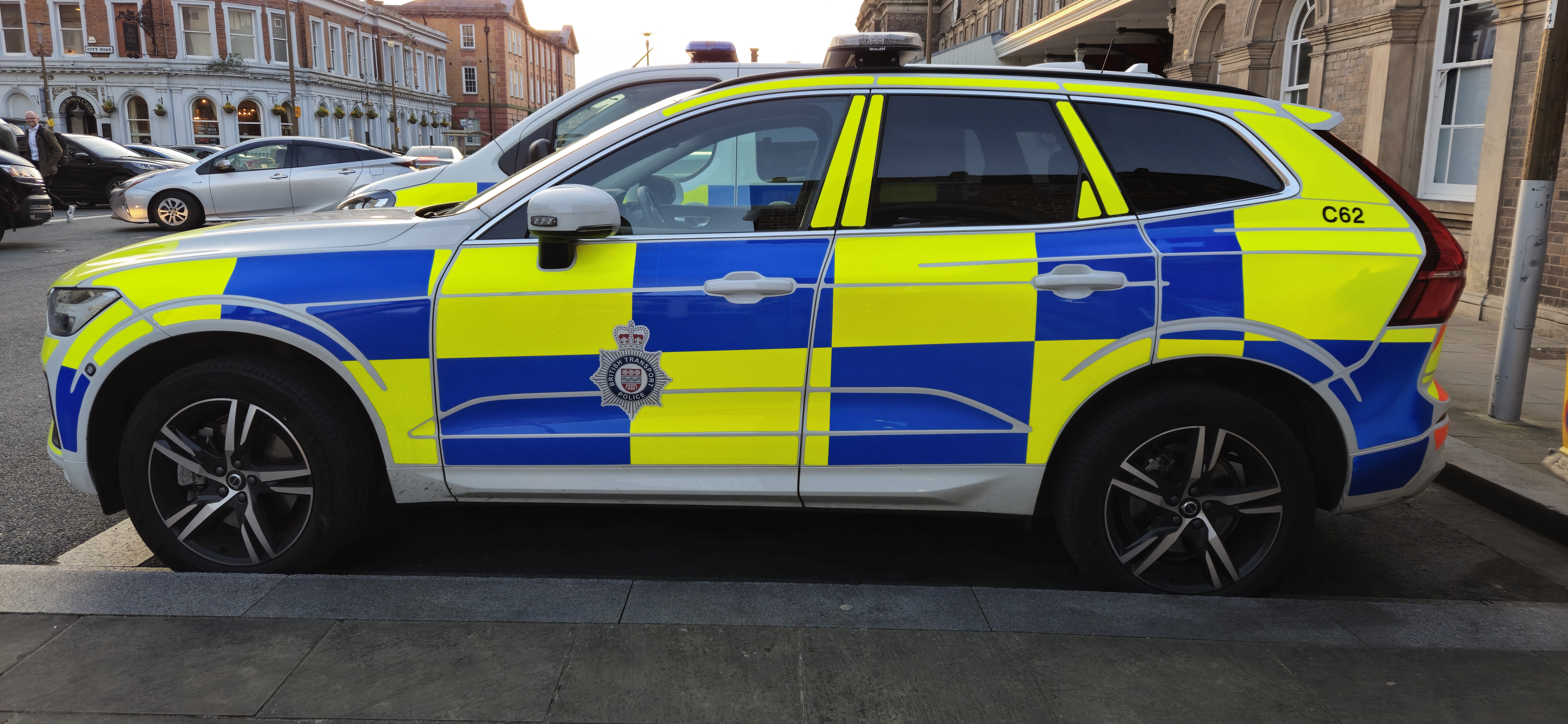
A Volvo XC60 of the British Transport Police

In the United Kingdom, the majority of the emergency services have adopted the Battenburg style of markings; nearly half of all police forces adopted the markings within three years of their introduction, and over three-quarters were using it by 2003.

In 2004, following the widespread adoption and recognition of the Battenburg markings on police vehicles, the Home Office recommended that all police vehicles, not just those on traffic duty, use "half-Battenburg" livery, formalising the practice of several forces.

In the United Kingdom, each emergency service has been allocated a specified darker colour in addition to yellow, with the police continuing to use blue, ambulances using green, and the fire service their traditional red. Other government agencies, such as immigration enforcement, have adopted a variation without using reflective yellow.

The use of these colours in retro-reflective material is controlled by the Road Vehicle Lighting Regulations 1989, Schedule 17, Part 2; with vehicles legally allowed to use only amber reflective material (and red near the rear of the vehicle).

== See also ==
- Sillitoe tartan
- Aerial roof markings
- Blues and twos
- Panda car
- Jam sandwich (police car)
