= Jam sandwich (police car) =

White police car with red stripe

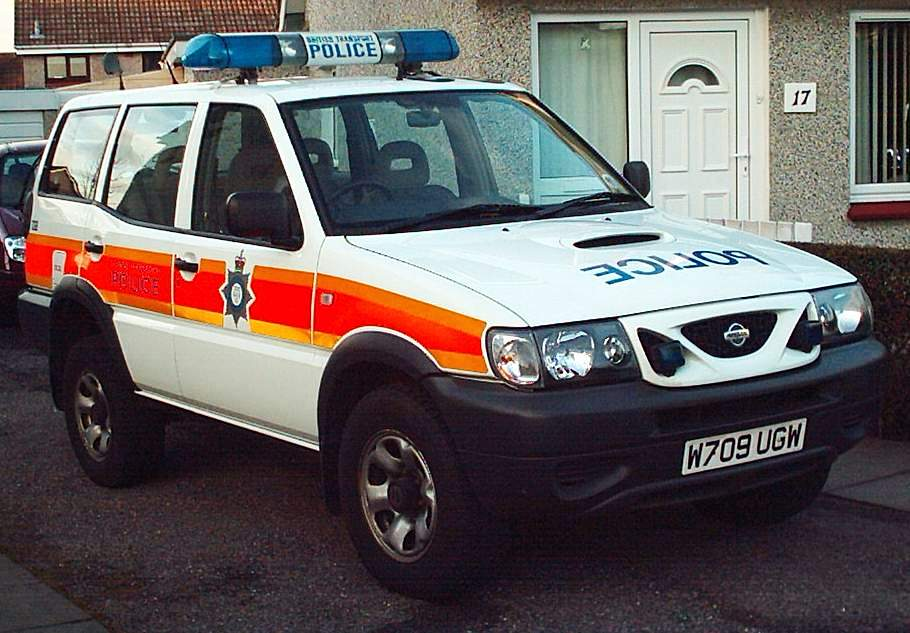
A British Transport Police Nissan Terrano, featuring "jam sandwich" livery

The "jam sandwich" variant used by the Metropolitan Police

In British slang, a "jam sandwich" or "jam butty" is a police car with a red or orange stripe applied to the side. The livery design was used by British police on most police vehicles in the country from the mid-1960s to the early 2010s, when it was largely replaced by Battenburg markings.

== History ==
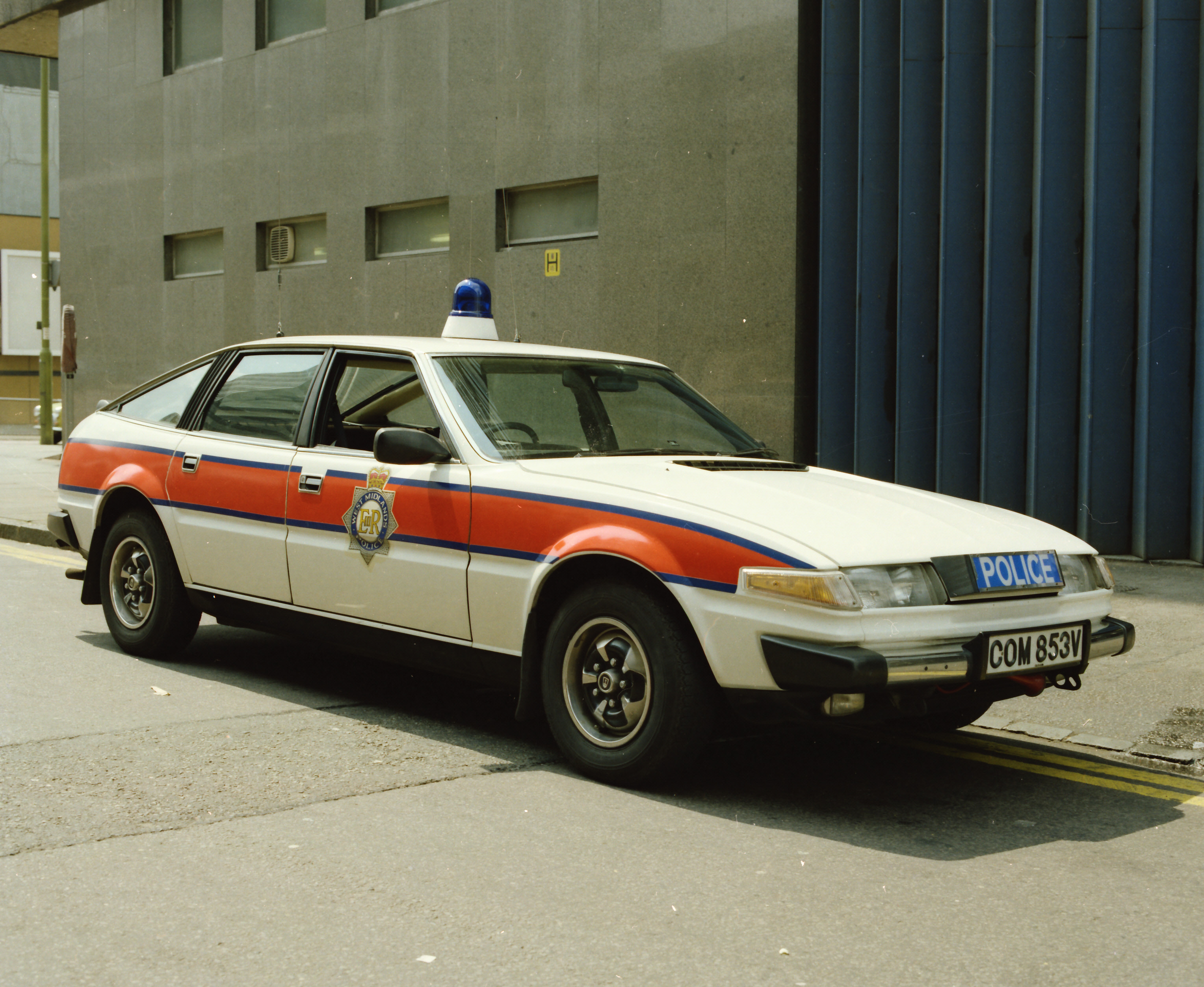
A West Midlands Police Rover SD1 circa 1979, featuring "jam sandwich" livery encompassing most of the vehicle's midline

The term "jam sandwich" came into common use in the 1970s, as police cars changed from block colour schemes such as the blue and white "panda car" to broad fluorescent sidestriped liveries on white or grey base paint. A thin amber sidestripe, fitted using fluorescent tape and vinyl sheeting, was first applied to vehicles of the East Sussex Constabulary in 1965, introduced on the recommendation of Chief Constable George Terry. Some forces, such as the Hertfordshire Constabulary, would later introduce a blue border around the sidestripe. This livery scheme was seen as reminiscent of jam sandwiched between two slices of white bread, hence the name. The slang was popularised on TV shows such as The Bill, The Sweeney and Minder; as well as spreading through the use of CB radio.

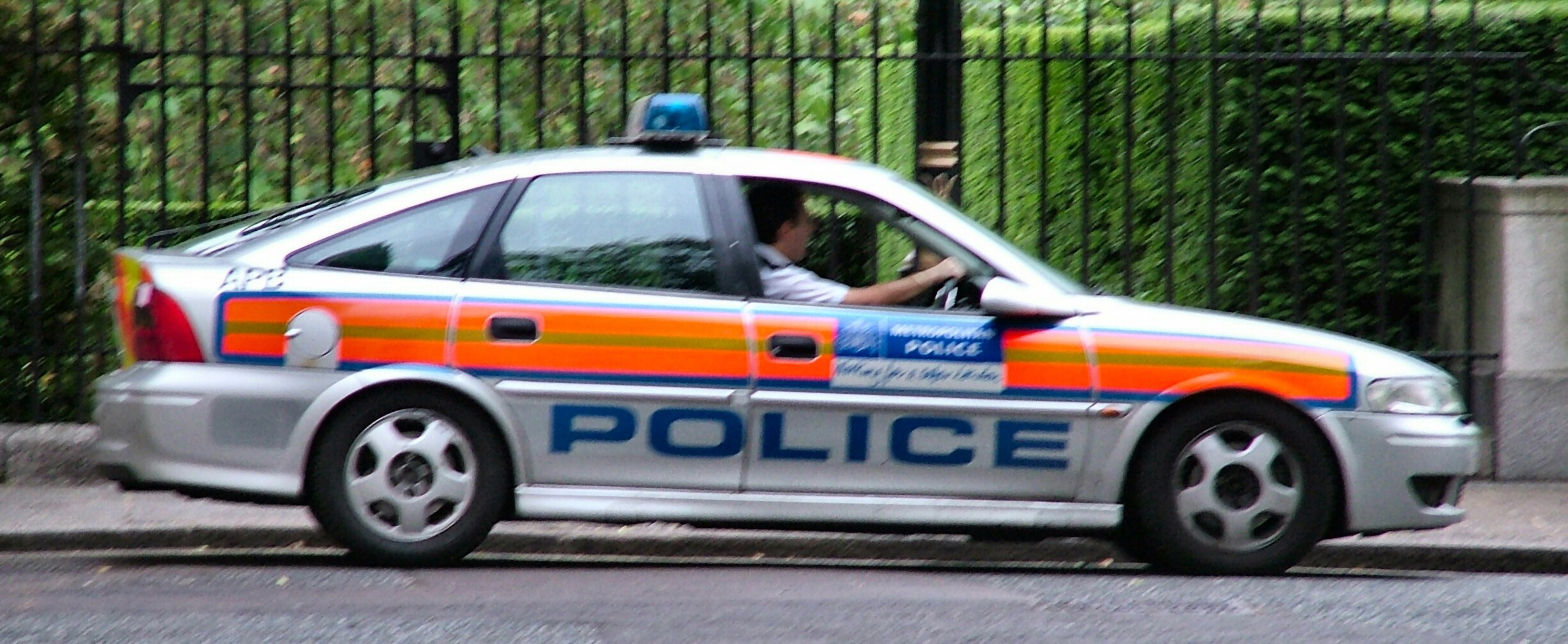
Metropolitan Police Vauxhall Vectra with "jam sandwich" stripe, silver base paint and large 'POLICE' lettering

The "jam sandwich" first came into use with London's Metropolitan Police in 1978, first applied on a fleet of new high-performance Rover SD1 traffic cars. Marked vehicles were initially finished in base white paint with "jam sandwich" livery applied on each side, however the base colour was changed to silver from 2002 to help improve a vehicle's resale value when it was retired from police use.

=== Replacement ===
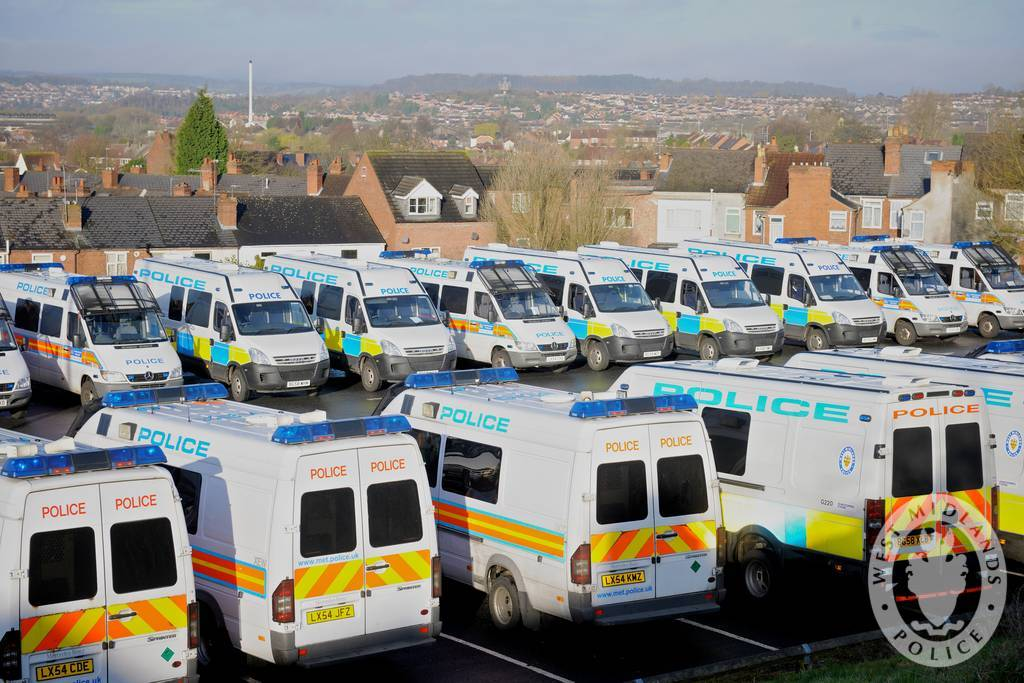
Vans from the Metropolitan Police in jam sandwich livery and vans from West Midlands Police in Battenburg markings

The "jam sandwich" livery on police vehicles across the United Kingdom has today been replaced by Battenburg markings, first introduced in 1998 following research that the livery makes the vehicle easily identifiable by oncoming drivers as a police vehicle from at least 500 metres (1,600 ft). As part of a move to promote "High Visibility Policing", by 2003 76% of forces had begun adopting the markings as well as a "half battenburg" variant for urban and suburban patrols. This livery began to be introduced on new vehicles delivered to the Metropolitan Police from November 2012, while other police forces adopted the livery more widely earlier.

In the Metropolitan Police, the term 'jam sandwich' now colloquially refers to the car's livery only, as worn by remaining older vehicles and public order carriers that have not yet been replaced.

== Use outside the United Kingdom ==
Caltrans uses a similar livery on their work vehicles for visibility. The livery uses retroreflective wrapping.

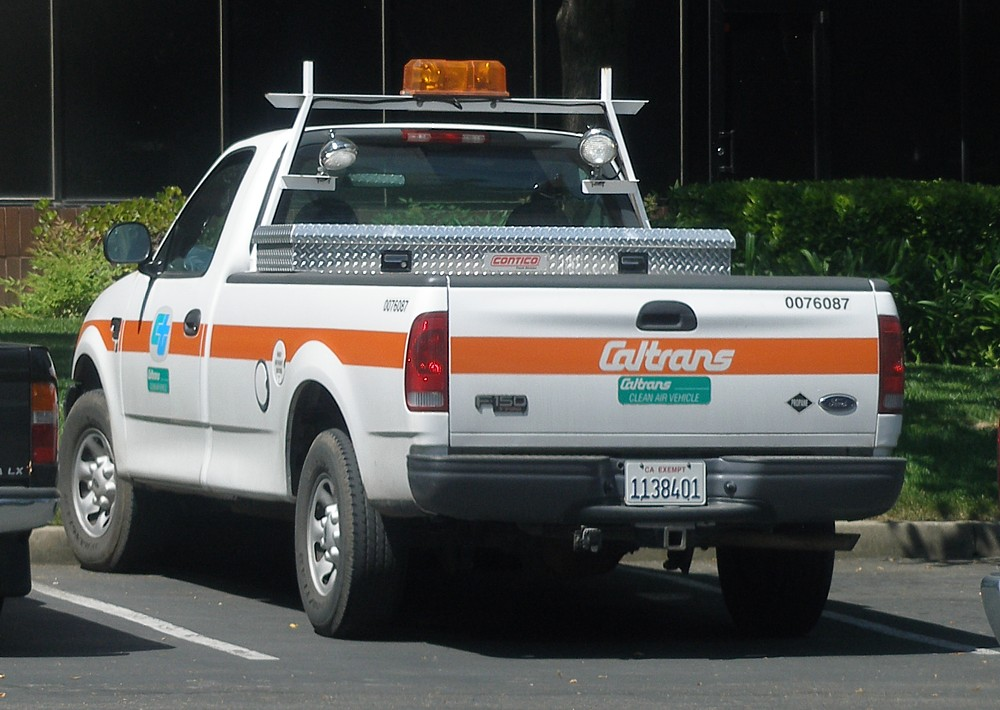
A Caltrans work truck with a livery similar to the jam sandwich.

== See also ==
- Panda car
- Battenburg markings
- Aerial roof markings
