= Tipstaff =

Court officer, law clerk, or symbolic object

A tipstaff is an officer of a court or, in some countries, a law clerk to a judge. The duties of the position vary from country to country. It is also the name of a symbolic rod, which represents the authority of the tipstaff or other officials such as senior police officers.

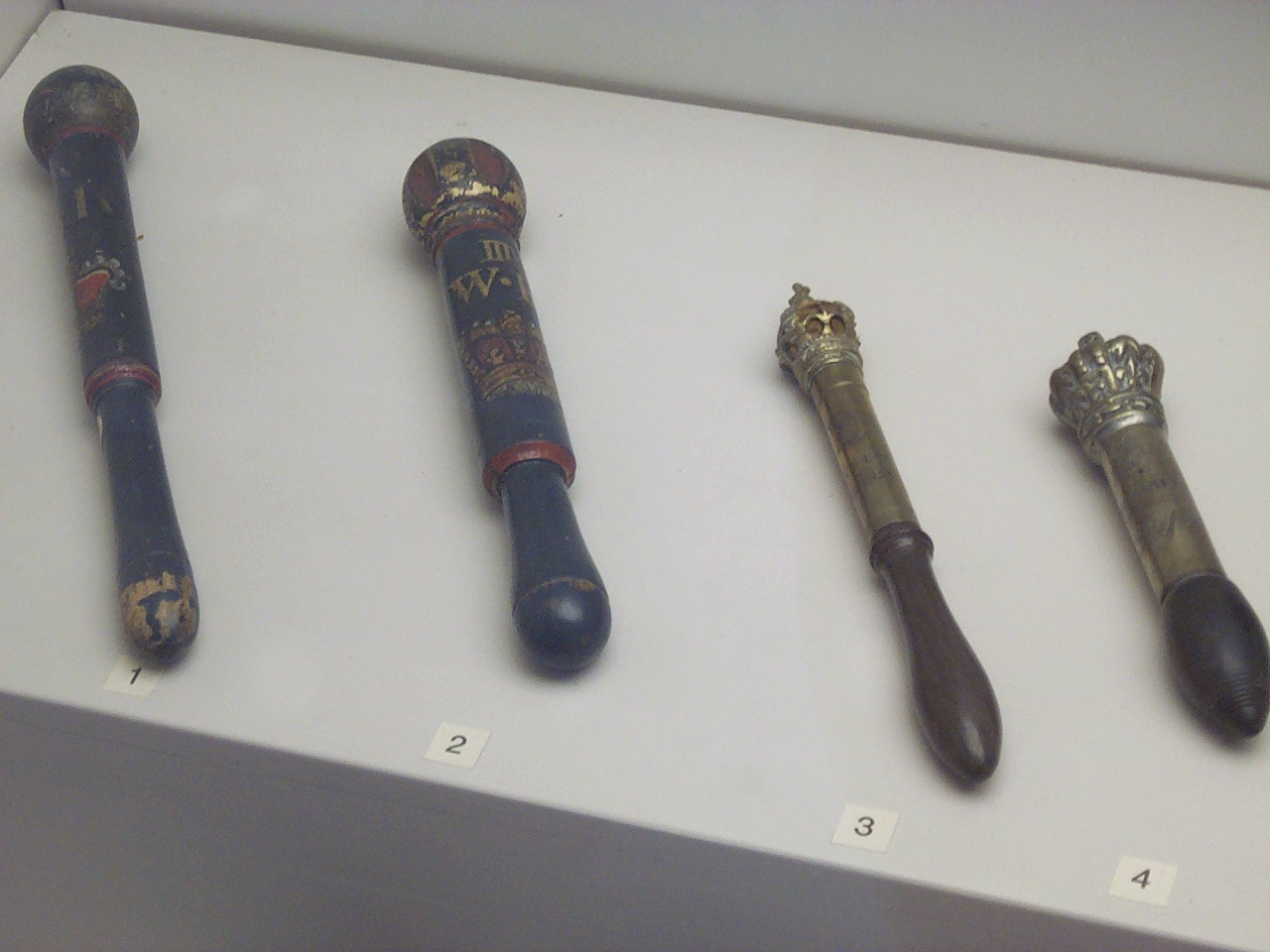
Tipstaves (the short clubs after which the office is named) on display at Bedford Museum

== History ==
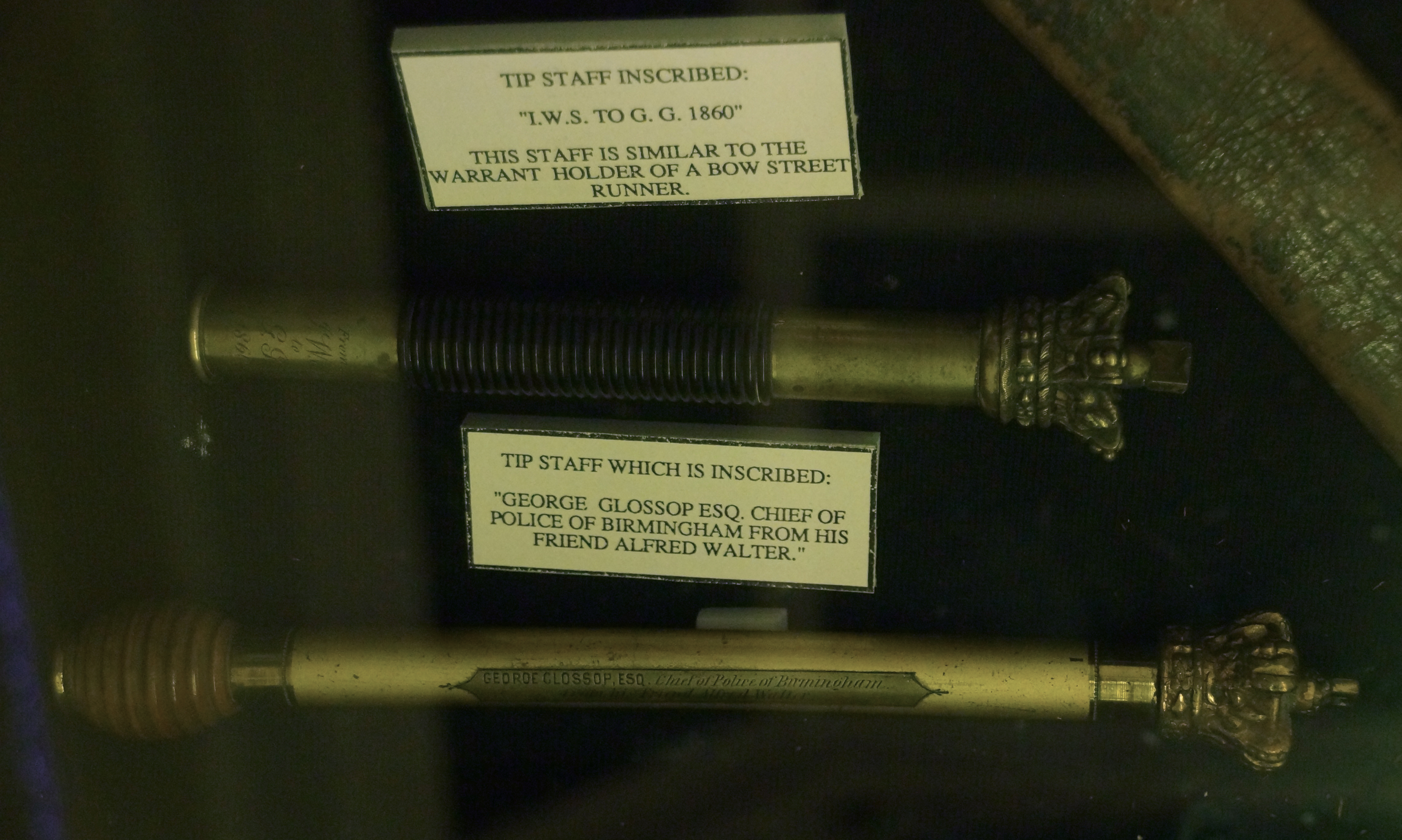
Police tipstaves in West Midlands Police Museum

The office of Tipstaff was originally military in nature. The Ordinances for Calais Act 1535 (27 Hen. 8. c. 63) stipulating the personnel required to man the English castle at Calais said that there should be:

Fyrst one Deputie of and for the said Towne and Marches, one High Marshall, one Lieftenant of the Castell of Caleis, one Treasourer, one Comptroller, one High Porter, one Under Marshall, xxiiij [twenty-four] Speares, xix [nineteen] Archers on horsebacke, foure Skewrers, sixe Typped staves, xij [twelve] Vynteners, xviij [eighteen] Constables, Cxxv [one hundred twenty-five] Souldeours every of the said Souldeours at viij [eight] pence by the daye. — Statutes of the Realm Vol 3 (1509-47) p. 684.

The same act also gave instructions for selecting a replacement should a Tippstaff die in service.

And if it happen the rowme of any of the Typped Staves to become voyde by death expulsion foristcure or other wyse, that then the said Deputie for the tyme beyng shall assemble before hym all the Vynteners and Constables of the said Towne, and shall electe and chose the moste personable auncyent sadde and discrete persone, beyng best langaged... — Statutes of the Realm Vol 3 (1509-47) p. 691.

This appointment to be confirmed by the Comptroller and Treasurer of the Castle.

The office then seems to have transferred to early forms of law enforcement. In 1555 when Reverend Rowland Taylor was burned at the stake during the reign of Queen Mary I for having religious views that were contrary to those of Lord Chancellor Gardiner, Foxe's Book of Martyrs states that Taylor would have spoken to the people but as soon as he opened his mouth the yeoman of the guard thrust a tipstaff into his mouth, and would in no way permit him to speak. This is also quoted in Five English Reformers by J. C. Ryle.

And by 1570 it has also attained some ceremonial functions, "The Knight Marshall with all hys tippe staves".

By the middle of the nineteenth century the term has transferred to a baton wielded by members of the embryonic police authorities, officers would arrest people by beating them with a tipped staff or stave. The staff was made of wood or metal or both, topped with a crown. The crown, which unscrewed, could be removed to reveal inside the hollow staff a warrant appointing the holder to their position of authority. Some staves were definitely a means of protection and this is where the present day policeman's baton, or truncheon, originates.

Examples remain at the Royal Courts of Justice and the Metropolitan Police Heritage Centre in London and vary depending on the type and rank of officer. These tipstaves were first carried in the late 18th and early 19th centuries. When detectives (in plain clothes) were first authorised, the tipstaves issued to plainclothes officers from 1867 were re-issued in 1870 and engraved "Metropolitan Police officer in plain clothes".

The staff kept at the Royal Courts of Justice is now only used on ceremonial occasions. It is 12 inches in length and made of ebony decorated with a silver crown and three bands of silver engraved with the Royal Arms at the top. Around the middle is inscribed "Amos Hawkins, Tipstaff Courts of Chancery" and around the bottom is inscribed "Appointed 14th January, 1884, by the Rt. Hon. The Earl of Selborne, L.C." with another coat of Royal Arms. The date was that on which this staff was first used, soon after the law courts were opened. Prior to 1884, each tipstaff had his own staff, which he retained when he retired.

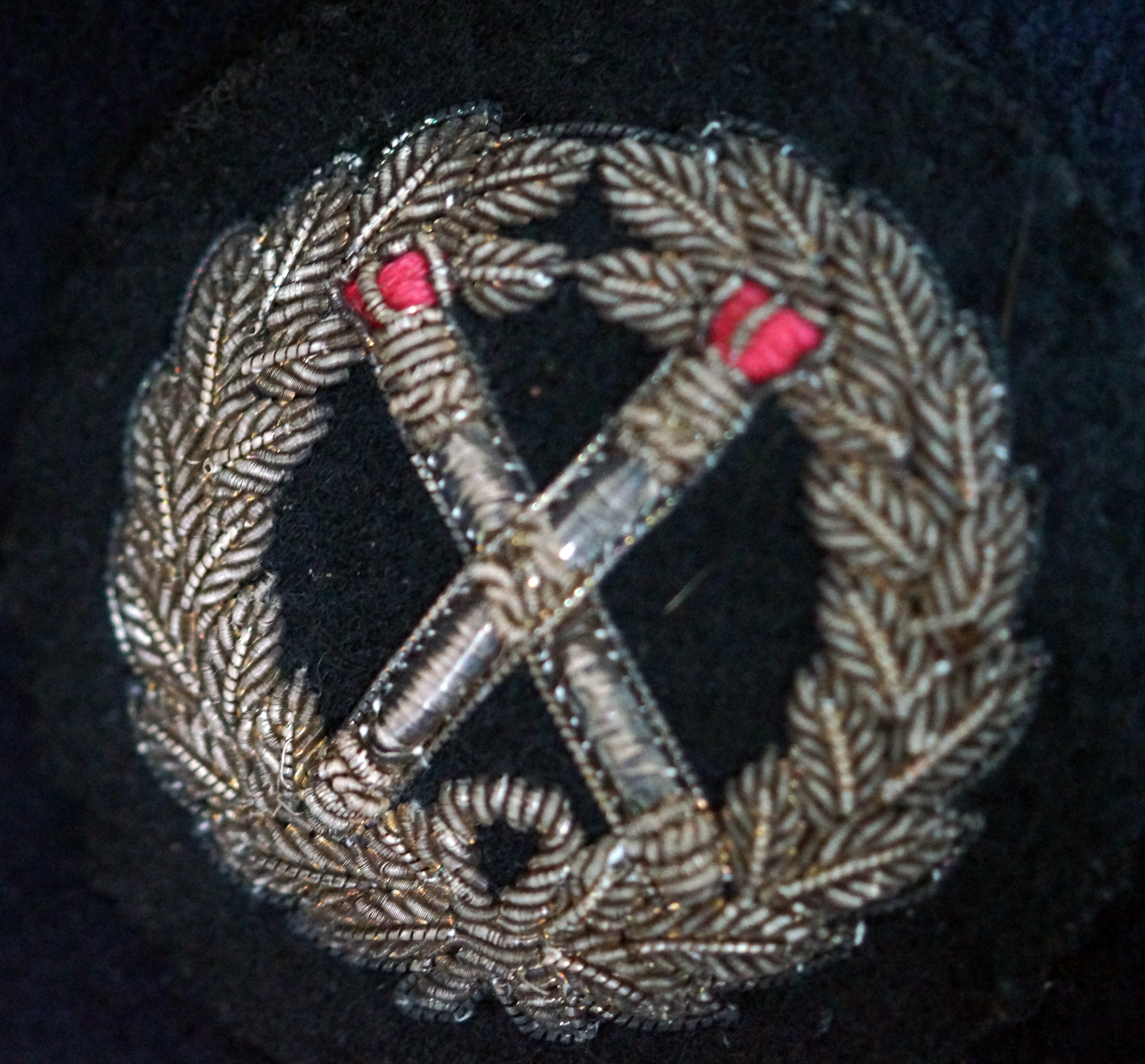
Crossed tipstaves within a wreath – rank of police assistant chief constable or commander in the UK

== As a symbol ==
The emblem of two crossed tipstaves within a wreath appears on the rank insignia of senior police officers in several Commonwealth countries, including the United Kingdom and Australia. In Canada, the emblem is used for the most senior officers of the Ontario Provincial Police and Royal Newfoundland Constabulary.

== Current usage ==
=== Australia ===
In Australia, a tipstaff is roughly equivalent to a law clerk in the United States. The term is used principally in the Supreme Court of New South Wales and in the County Court of Victoria.

=== Ireland ===
In Ireland, a tipstaff is a personal aide to a judge. The role of tipstaff has been replaced by that of judicial assistant for judges appointed after 2011. No new tipstaves have been recruited since 2011 and only a small number remain.

=== United Kingdom ===
==== England and Wales ====
There are currently two tipstaves in England and Wales: one is an officer of the Royal Borough of Kingston upon Thames and the other an officer of the High Court of England and Wales, appointed under section 27 of the Courts Act 1971. It is the latter to which this section refers.

The High Court tipstaff may appoint three assistants and can call on any constable, bailiff or member of the public to assist in carrying out their duties. Their jurisdiction extends throughout England and Wales. They are authorised to force entry if necessary, and will have a police officer present to prevent breach of the peace. The relevant territorial police force is informed of arrests.

Sometimes a local bailiff or police will detain a person in custody until the tipstaff arrives to collect them and take them to court or prison. Pentonville Prison (for civil offenders) is obliged to take into custody‚ no matter what the circumstances‚ anybody taken there by the tipstaff. A tipstaff may make the same demands of the custody suite within the Royal Courts of Justice itself, and they are obliged to take into custody any individual he brings there.

The tipstaff heads a procession of the lord chancellor and judges at the start of the legal year‚ preceding them with their staff as a symbol of authority and law enforcement. They also lead the lord mayor from their golden coach to the lord chief justice's court for the "swearing in" of the lord mayor‚ afterwards attending the Lord Mayor's Banquet, having led the lord chancellor into the guildhall. The black uniform‚ only worn on ceremonial occasions‚ is based on that of a Victorian police inspector. They wear a black hat with gold braid trimmings and jacket with silver buttons‚ a wing collar with a white bow tie and white gloves. The tipstaff is the only person authorised to make an arrest within the precincts of the Royal Courts of Justice.

Every applicable order made in the High Court is addressed to the tipstaff: "I hereby command you the Tipstaff and your assistants in His Majesty's name to take and safely convey and deliver the said ... to the Governor of His Majesty's Prison" (as in the case of making an arrest). The majority of their work involves taking children into custody (i.e. a place of safety)‚ including cases of child abduction abroad.

In child abduction cases, there may be a "seek and locate" order backed by a bench warrant ordering any person with knowledge of the child to give that information to the tipstaff or to their deputy or assistants. Related orders may require the alleged abductor to hand their passport and other travel documents to the tipstaff, and order the tipstaff to take the child and deliver them to a designated place. There may also be a "port alert" executed by the tipstaff, to help prevent the child being taken abroad.

In the case of children who have been declared a ward of court i.e. where the court is acting in loco parentis, a tipstaff has a role in ensuring that those children are delivered to the locations specified by the court.

==== Northern Ireland ====
Tipstaves and court criers in Northern Ireland have no enforcement role, but act as personal assistants to high court and county court judges.

=== United States ===
In some states of the United States, a tipstaff is called a tipstave and is responsible for courtroom decorum. Their position is similar to that of a bailiff. The Civil Division of the Municipal Court of Philadelphia employs tipstaves as clerks to the court. The Criminal Trial Division employs tipstaves in positions commonly referred to as court officers.

== See also ==
- Bailiff
- Marshal
- Police
- Sheriff
