= Auxiliary constable =

Auxiliary constables or reserve constables (reserve constable has a different definition in British Columbia) are unpaid citizens in Canada who volunteer their time and skills to a police force. They are uniformed, unarmed members who perform a similar role to their UK counterparts in the Special Constabulary. Their main function is to supplement the police force with additional manpower, with duties varying by appointment, geographical location and the needs of the specific detachment/department.

== Durham Regional Police Auxiliary Unit ==
Durham Regional Police (DRP) Auxiliary unit was created in 1977 and provide additional resources to the force. Auxiliary members are involved in community-based initiatives and may be paired with regular officers on patrol. There are 90 members in the unit in total with 75 being auxiliary constables, 12 being auxiliary sergeants, 4 being auxiliary staff sergeants, and 1 being an auxiliary inspector.

Unlike front line officers, auxiliary members wear a light blue shirt and cap has a red and black Battenburg markings instead of solid red. Auxiliary constables do not carry a firearm but do carry a baton and handcuffs.

== Halton Regional Police Service Auxiliary Unit ==
The Halton Regional Police Service (HRPS) Auxiliary unit was founded in 1989, and is composed of 60 trained civilian volunteers.

HRPS Auxiliary officers support the regular service as follows:

- Crime prevention initiatives
- Crowd control
- Traffic control
- Car and foot patrol with regular service members
- Bike Unit
- Emergency and disaster response
- RIDE initiatives
- Child safety seat clinics

Unlike front line officers, auxiliary members wear a light blue shirt and cap has a red and black Battenburg markings instead of solid red. Auxiliary constables are unarmed.

== Niagara Regional Police Service Auxiliary Unit ==
Niagara Regional Police Service has a 75-member auxiliary unit.

Unlike front line officers, auxiliary members wear caps with a red and black Battenburg markings, instead of solid red. Auxiliary constables are unarmed.

== Ontario Provincial Police Auxiliary program ==
The Ontario Provincial Police Auxiliary program follows a mission statement: "To provide fully trained volunteer Auxiliary Members to perform police duties in special circumstances, including emergencies, when there are not sufficient O.P.P. police officers.". The O.P.P. auxiliary is a volunteer program where selected citizens receive special training in order to perform many duties such as community policing initiatives and projects, regular patrol, crime and disaster scenes, large gatherings or parades for crowd and traffic control, and traffic control at accidents. The Ontario Provincial Police auxiliary program is the only such Canadian program that requires its auxiliary constables to attend a full-time recruit course conducted near its regular training facility in Orillia,. This is followed by ongoing in-service training at the detachments. The program may also serve as a stepping stone for potential future employment.

The O.P.P. Auxiliary has an authorized strength of 1000 auxiliary members and is the largest police auxiliary unit in Ontario.

It is recognized that the O.P.P. Auxiliary members shall not be utilized to replace regular members in any duties. Training must occur for auxiliary personnel to a level to provide necessary skills to safely fulfill the requirements of their mandate under the Police Services Act, and that they participate within those duties which enhance community policing efforts, crime prevention programs, and public service as opposed to direct police service delivery.

The Ontario Police Services Act does, however, provide for instances when the Auxiliary Member may have the authority of a Police Officer. This can occur in an emergency situation where the O.P.P. requires additional strength to cope with a special occasion or event. To insure proficiency, O.P.P. auxiliary constables are required to conduct monthly patrol duties with regular constables. O.P.P. auxiliary constables are not authorised to carry side arms during normal operations, but may be equipped with a long gun when patrolling with a regular member. All O.P.P. auxiliary members receive annual training with both side arms and long guns.

=== History of the O.P.P. Auxiliary ===
The O.P.P. Auxiliary was originally formed in 1960 by an Order-in-Council when the program absorbed the Emergency Measures Organization who were trained in crowd control and first aid. The Program was managed by the O.P.P. and its members in the early years helped at community events and patrolled with regular O.P.P. members. Following an audit in 1988 a number of recommendations were made and in 1991 they became self-directed and the Commissioner appointed Auxiliary Chief Superintendent Terry Harkins as its executive director; Provincial Commander of the O.P.P. Auxiliary.

The volunteer component developed and included ranks, positions, promotional processes that mirrored the regular O.P.P. structure.

In the new organization, the Auxiliary took on the responsibility for standardized selection process and training of its members. The Auxiliary O.P.P. uniform differs only in the light blue shirt they wear as opposed to the dark blue shirt worn by regular O.P.P. members and all components of their outwear bear insignia identifying them as "Auxiliary/Auxiliare". In 1997 GATB (General Aptitude Test Battery) and Psychological Testing of new auxiliary recruits commenced.

Members of the auxiliary are "unpaid" and receive some compensation for travel and meals. Enrollment requirements are: Canadian citizen or permanent resident of Canada, minimum age of 18 years, Ontario Secondary School Graduation diploma or equivalent, have "standard" First Aid, mentally and physically able to perform duties of auxiliary member, possess a valid drivers license, good driving records and successfully complete the interview process.

=== Duties ===
- Traffic control
- Ground security at major events
- Doing surveys
- Seat belt clinics
- Assisting on RIDE initiatives
- Bicycle inspections and rodeos
- Assisting at safety displays and presentations
- Foot and road patrols with regular members
- Accompanying regular members on marine and snow vehicle patrol
- Victim assistance
- Tagging evidence
- Ceremonial duties
- Search and rescue

=== Area of Responsibility ===
The OPP Auxiliaries operate in the following areas:

- Central Region
- Northeast Region
- Northwest Region
- Western Region
- Eastern Region
- Highway Safety Division

== Ottawa Police Service Auxiliary Unit ==
Ottawa Police Service's Auxiliary Unit was established on September 11, 2008. Their main duty is community policing.

Other duties include:

- Crime Prevention Through Environmental Design (CPTED) audits
- Marine Patrol
- Child Car Seat Clinics
- Ride Alongs
- Assisting in Special Events
- Crime Prevention Initiatives

Unlike front line officers, auxiliary members wear a light blue shirt and cap has a red and black Battenburg markings instead of solid red. Auxiliary constables are unarmed.

== Peel Regional Police Auxiliary ==
The Peel Regional Police Auxiliary program has 100 officers made up of unarmed volunteers and was formed in 1989.

They support regular Peel officers with:

- patrol and marine escorts
- R.I.D.E, program assistance
- special events
- emergency callout
- Auxiliary Honour Guard
- colours at Annual Unit Inspection

Unlike front line officers, auxiliary members wear a light blue shirt and cap has a red and black Battenburg markings instead of solid red. Auxiliary constables are unarmed.

== Royal Canadian Mounted Police Auxiliary ==
The Royal Canadian Mounted Police (RCMP) started its Auxiliary programme in 1963 to assist the police during emergencies. The program was created under the Emergency Measures Act, but as time went by, the program evolved into its present-day status: complementing the RCMP in general operations. Auxiliary Constables work in Federal/national (RCMP), Provincial and Municipal Police Forces.

Auxiliary constables were allowed to be armed, but the policy changed in 1989 when they were told to surrender their issued weapons.

=== RCMP Auxiliary Constables History ===
Royal Canadian Mounted Police heraldic badge.

- RCMP first introduced the program to the provinces in 1963.
- Restricted to provinces/territories which have policing contracts with the RCMP and have provincial legislation providing for the appointment of auxiliaries.
- Active auxiliary programs are currently in place in all provinces except Ontario and Quebec, which have their own provincial police forces and do not require RCMP. The only exception is the National Capital Region (Ottawa-Gatineau) which is under federal, not provincial, control.

Approximately 2,400 auxiliary members, divided among the different provincial auxiliary programs are currently serving with the RCMP. General policy guidelines are issued from Headquarters. Divisions, in co-operation with the provincial governments, are responsible for organising and administering the program within these guidelines. All costs associated with the program are the responsibility of the provincial government. Uniforms are supplied by the RCMP and costs charged back to the provinces.

=== Current status ===
- Auxiliary members are unpaid volunteers and since they are not employees of the RCMP, they are not entitled to the normal benefits and privileges of regular members.
- Applicants for the RCMP auxiliary constable program are identified in the communities.
- Applicants who volunteer must meet basic requirements.
- Applicants must achieve and maintain a security clearance
- Applicants must volunteer 160 hours annually
- Auxiliary members wear a uniform with shoulder badges showing the word "Auxiliary/Auxiliaire" as well as on their jackets and ballistic vest
- Auxiliaries are not currently authorized to accompany regular members on patrol but can perform other police functions under supervision, such as office duties, special events, property checks and traffic and crowd control. Additionally, they often assist regular members during peacetime emergencies and searches for lost persons.
- Participants will be covered by insurance against injury and civil liability and will have completed the approved RCMP training program for auxiliary constables.

=== Duties ===
Duties differs between each detachment, but in general, they perform the following tasks:

- ATV Patrols
- Bike Patrols
- Coastal Watch
- Community Police Station /Office/Detachment activities
- Community Policing/ Crime Prevention Display
- Community/ Special Events
- Fingerprinting Children
- Neighbourhood Watch
- Personal Safety Lectures and demonstrations
- Safety talk and activities, such as safety audits
- Traffic Control

Auxiliary members wear the same light grey shirt, and their cap has blue band instead of yellow. Auxiliary constables are unarmed.

== Toronto Police Service Auxiliary ==
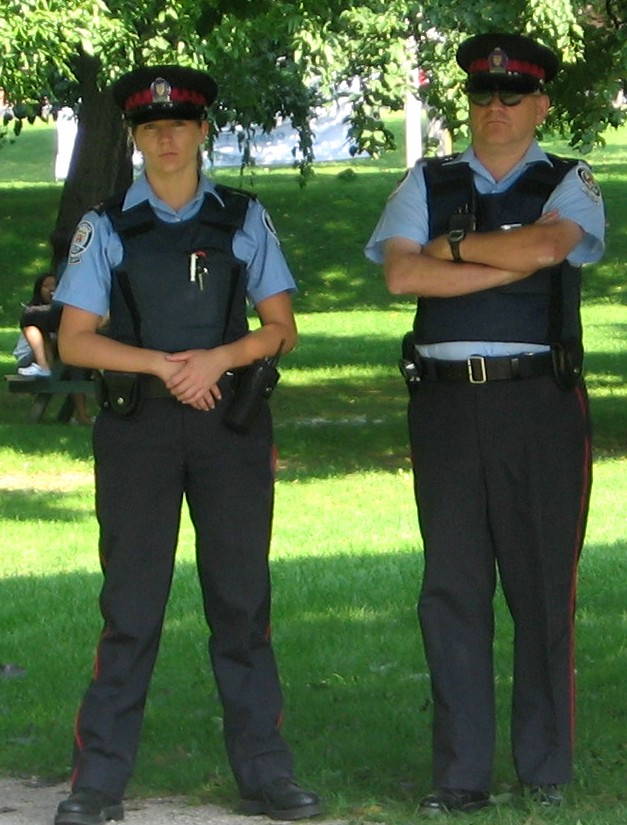
Two auxiliary police officers in Ramsden Park

Toronto Police Service Auxiliary members support the regular service in the delivery of community-based crime prevention initiatives and ground searches for lost or missing persons. Members can also be seen volunteering at community events such as parades and fairs and assisting in car and foot patrols. Established in 1957, there are currently 340 auxiliary officers on the force.

- Emergency and Disaster Response
- Community-Based Policing
- Crime Prevention Initiatives
- Traffic Control
- General Patrol
- Crowd Control
- Missing Persons Searches
- Display at Major Malls and Parades

Unlike front line officers, auxiliary members wear a light blue shirt, and their cap has red and black Battenburg markings, instead of solid red. Auxiliary constables are unarmed.

== Victoria Police Department Reserve Officers Program ==
Victoria Police Department Reserve officers are volunteers whom assist regular officers and the force with:

- crime prevention program
- traffic and special events duties
- regular patrol with regular officers

== Winnipeg Police Service Auxiliary Cadet ==
Winnipeg Police Service (WPS) auxiliary service auxiliary cadets are civilian constables in uniform providing additional resources for regular sworn members.

== York Regional Police Auxiliary ==
120 York Regional Police Auxiliary members support the regular service in the delivery of community-based crime prevention initiatives and ground searches for lost or missing persons. Members can also be seen volunteering at community events such as parades and fairs and assisting in car and foot patrols.

- Emergency and Disaster Response
- Community-Based Policing
- Crime Prevention Initiatives
- Traffic Control
- General Patrol
- Crowd Control
- Missing Persons Searches

Similar to front line officers, auxiliary members wear a similar dark blue shirt but with an "Auxiliary" shoulder patch and a forge cap but with red and black Sillitoe tartan instead of solid red. Auxiliary constables are unarmed.

== Cobourg Police Service Auxiliary Unit ==
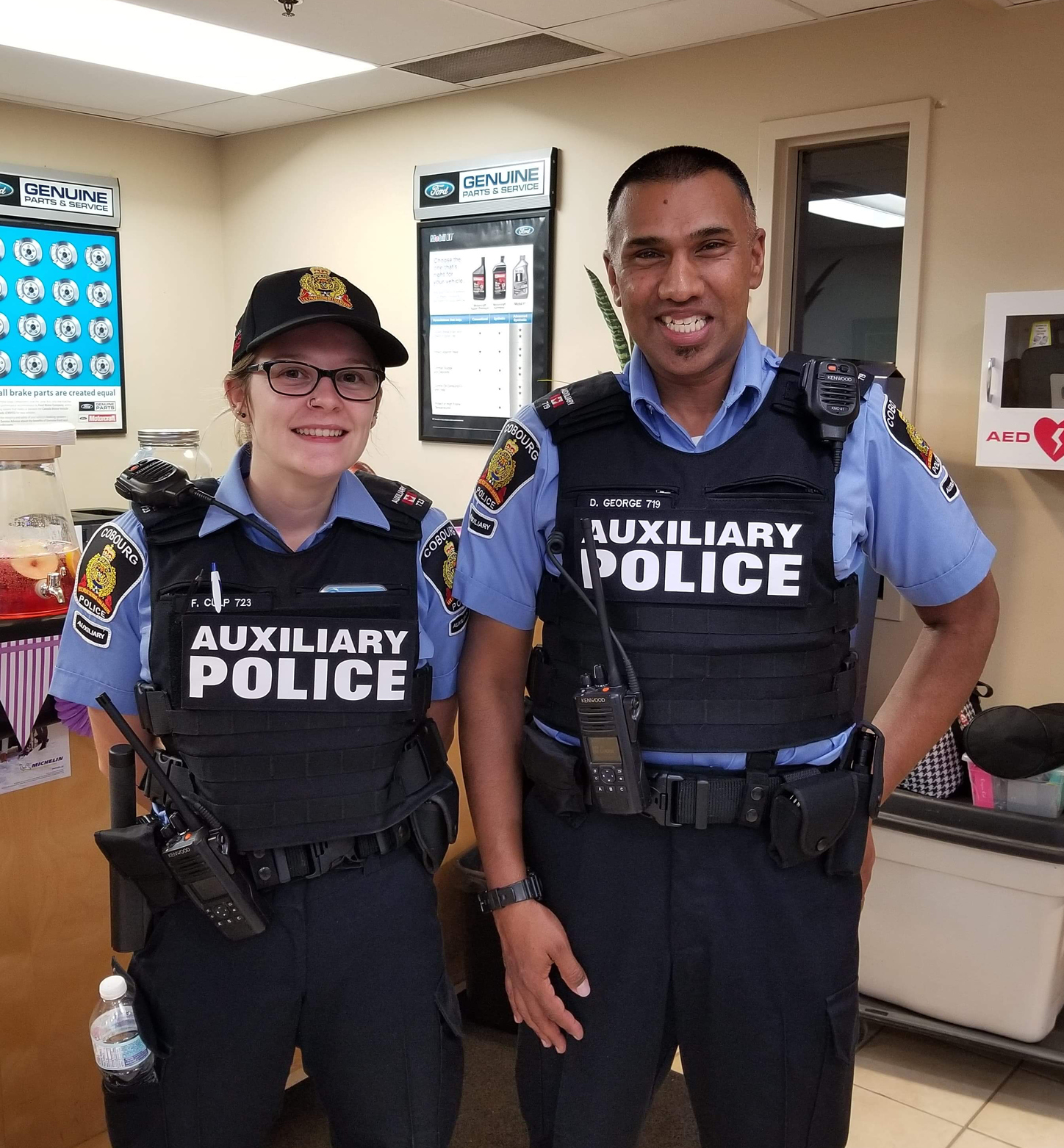

The Cobourg Police Service (CPS) Auxiliary unit is composed of 13 trained civilian volunteers. CPS Auxiliary officers support the regular service as follows:

- Crime Prevention initiatives
- Assisting in Special Events
- Emergency callouts (missing children, missing elderly, canvassing)
- Crowd Control and traffic control
- Car, Foot, Bike and Segway patrols, both general patrol and directed patrol
- Emergency and Disaster Response
- RIDE initiatives
- St John Ambulance First Aid Instruction of all service members
- Segway training of all service members
- Child safety seat clinics
- CPTED Audits, both residential and commercial

CPS Auxiliary members wear a light blue shirt and forage cap (ball cap in the summer) that includes Auxiliary patches identifying Auxiliary members. They are trained in Use of Force, including firearms familiarization. They also carry naloxone to assist the public in the event of opiate overdose. Auxiliary officers currently DO NOT carry firearms but are trained in their use, but do carry Expandable Batons and Handcuffs.

== See also ==
- Special constable
- Special police
- Auxiliary police
