= Police ranks of Canada =

Federal and provincial police ranks in Canada

The police in Canada's ranks differ according to the different police forces and depend on different laws at the federal, provincial, and municipal levels.

== Royal Canadian Mounted Police ==
The rank system of the RCMP is partly a result of their origin as a paramilitary force. Upon its founding on February 1, 1920, the RCMP adopted the rank insignia of the Canadian Army (which in turn came from the British Army), which is almost identical to that of the current Canadian Army. Like in the military, the RCMP also has a distinction between commissioned and non-commissioned officers. The non-commissioned ranks are mostly based on military ranks (apart from constable). Non-commissioned officer ranks above staff sergeant resemble those that formerly existed in the Canadian Army but have since been replaced by warrant officers. The commissioned officer ranks, by contrast, use a set of non-military titles that are often used in Commonwealth police services. The number of higher ranks, like chief superintendent and a deputy commissioner, has been added to and increased since the formation of the force, while the lower commissioned rank of sub-inspector has been dropped.

Officers

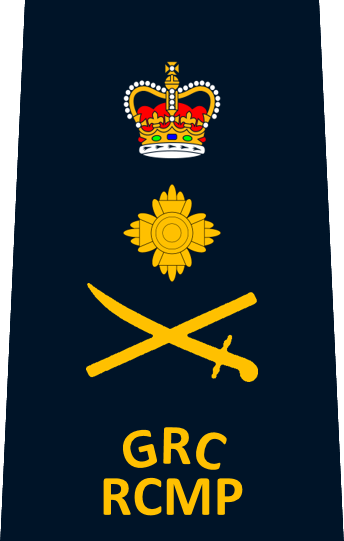
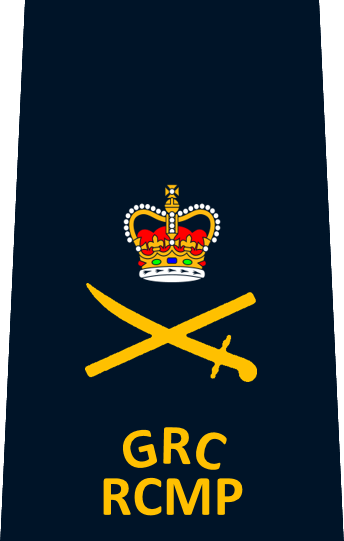
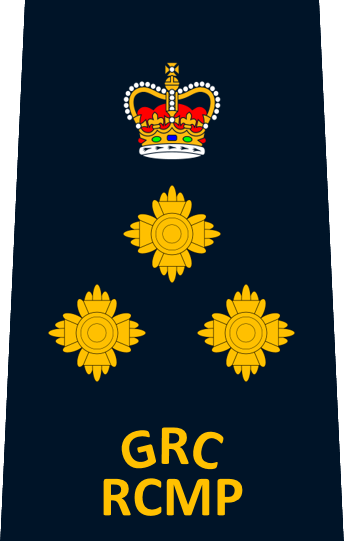
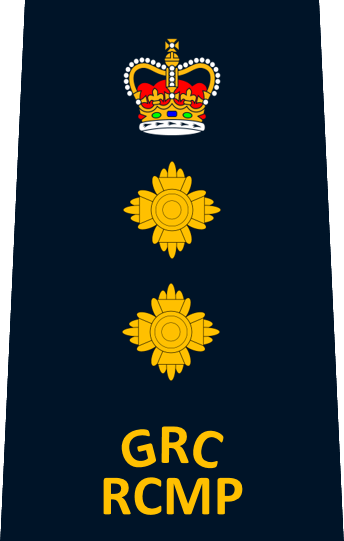
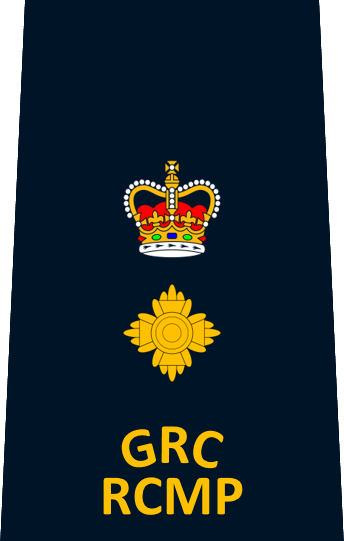
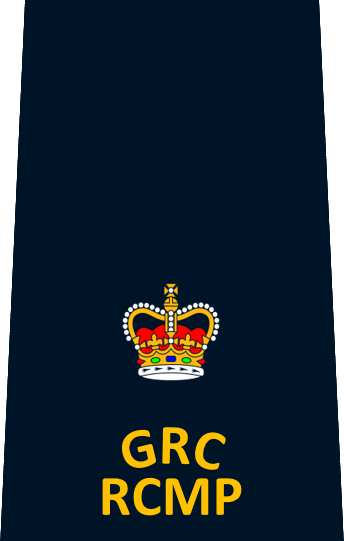
	Commissioner			Superintendent		Inspector
Royal Canadian Mounted Police
Royal Canadian Mounted Police	Commissioner; Commissaire	Deputy commissioner Sous-commissaire	Assistant commissioner Commissaire adjoint	Chief superintendent Surintendant principal	Superintendent; Surintendant	Inspector; Inspecteur
Slip on rank slides

Others

	Non-commissioned officers						Constables	Depot
Royal Canadian Mounted Police							No insignia
Royal Canadian Mounted Police	Corps sergeant major	Sergeant major	Staff sergeant major	Staff sergeant	Sergeant	Corporal	Constable	Cadet
Royal Canadian Mounted Police	Sergent-major du corps	Sergent-major	Sergent-major d'état major	Sergent d'état-major	Sergent	Caporal	Gendarme	Cadet
Slip on rank slides

== Parliamentary Protective Service ==
The PPS uses a similar ranks system to the RCMP, with the director being a chief superintendent on secondment from the RCMP. The officer-in-charge of PPS operations holds the rank of superintendent, team managers hold the rank of sergeant, supervisors hold the rank of corporal, and officers with no leadership responsibility hold the rank of constable.

== Alberta ==
=== Alberta Sheriffs Branch ===
Peace officer ranks for the Alberta Sheriffs Branch:

Ranks	Chief sheriff	Deputy chief	Superintendent	Inspector	Branch sergeant major	Sergeant	Sheriff III FTO	Sheriff III	Sheriff II	Sheriff I
Insignia								No insignia	No insignia	

=== Calgary Police Service ===
Rank	Chief	Deputy chief	Superintendent	Inspector	Regimental sergeant major	Staff sergeant	Sergeant	Senior constable level 2	Senior constable level 1	Constable (classes 1 to 5)	Auxiliary (non-sworn)
Insignia	c									No insignia	No insignia
Insignia	Slip-on	Slip-on	Slip-on	Slip-on	Arm patch	Arm patch	Arm patch	Arm patch	Arm patch	No insignia	No insignia

=== Edmonton Police Service ===
Ranks	Chief of police	Deputy chief	Superintendent	Inspector	Corps sergeant major	Staff sergeant	Sergeant	Senior constable	Constable
Insignia									No insignia

=== Lethbridge Police Service ===
Ranks	Chief of police	Deputy chief	Inspector	Staff sergeant	Sergeant	Senior constable	Constable
Insignia							No insignia

== British Columbia ==
=== British Columbia Sheriff Service ===
Ranks	Chief sheriff	Deputy chief	Superintendent	Staff inspector	Inspector	Staff sergeant	Sergeant	Deputy sheriff	Recruit sheriff
Insignia									

=== British Columbia Conservation Officer Service ===
- Chief conservation officer
- Deputy chief conservation officer
- Inspector
- Department Sergeant Major
- Staff sergeant
- Sergeant
- Corporal
- Conservation officer

=== British Columbia Commercial Vehicle Safety and Enforcement ===
No traditional ranking system outside of the ceremonial unit is in place.

- Departmental sergeant major -
- Troop sergeant - three chevrons
- - one chevron

=== Metro Vancouver Transit Police ===
Rank	Chief officer	Deputy chief officer	Superintendent	Inspector	Staff sergeant	Sergeant	Constable
Insignia							

=== New Westminster Police Department ===
Rank	Chief constable	Deputy chief constable	Superintendent Major	Superintendent	Inspector	Staff Sergeant	Sergeant	Corporal	First class constable qualified	First class constable	Second class constable	Third class constable	Fourth class constable
Insignia													

=== Vancouver Police Department ===
Rank	Chief constable	Deputy chief constable	Superintendent	Inspector	Staff sergeant	Sergeant	Police constable 1st class/detective	Police constable 2nd class	Police constable 3rd class	Police constable 4th class
Insignia										

- Special municipal constable (traffic authority/jail guard/community safety personnel)

=== Other British Columbia Police Services ===
Abbotsford Delta Nelson Port Moody Surrey West Vancouver Victoria

[icon] This section is empty. You can help by adding to it. (March 2026)

== Manitoba ==
=== Winnipeg Police Service ===
Rank	Chief of police	Deputy chief of police	Superintendent	Inspector	Staff sergeant	Sergeant	Detective sergeant / patrol sergeant	Senior constable	Constable
Insignia									enter

== Newfoundland and Labrador ==
=== Royal Newfoundland Constabulary ===
The Royal Newfoundland Constabulary is the provincial police service for the province of Newfoundland and Labrador.

Rank	Commanding officers		Senior officers		Police officers			Officers in training
Rank	Chief constable	Deputy chief	Superintendent	Inspector	Staff sergeant	Sergeant	Constable	Cadet
Insignia								

=== High Sheriff of Newfoundland and Labrador ===
The Office of the High Sheriff of Newfoundland and Labrador is a provincial law enforcement agency in the province of Newfoundland and Labrador. Founded in 1729, it is the oldest law enforcement agency in Canada.

- High sheriff
- Sub-sheriff
- Deputy sheriff II
- Deputy sheriff I
- Bailiff

== Nova Scotia ==
=== Nova Scotia Sheriff Service ===
The Nova Scotia Sheriff Service enforce orders from the courts in Nova Scotia and provide protective services to the Judiciary and courts system staff. At justice centres a sheriff leads a group of Sheriff Service staff, with all others being deputy sheriffs.

=== Halifax Regional Police ===
Rank structure within the Halifax Regional Police is a standard structure similar to many other law enforcement organizations within Canada. Starting with the highest-ranking commissioned officer within the department Chief of Police to the lowest rank of Constable.

Rank Structure	Insignia
Chief of Police	N/A
Deputy Chief	N/A
Superintendent	N/A
Inspector	N/A
Staff Sergeant	N/A
Sergeant	N/A
Constable	N/A

== Ontario ==
=== Ontario Provincial Police ===
Rank structure within the Ontario Provincial Police is paramilitary or quasi-military in nature, with several "non-commissioned" ranks leading to the "officer" ranks. Detective ranks fall laterally with the uniform ranks and is not a promotion above. Police constables in the OPP are uniquely known as "provincial constables."

Rank	Commissioner	Deputy commissioner	Chief superintendent	Superintendent	Inspector	Sergeant major	Staff sergeant / Detective staff sergeant	Sergeant / Detective sergeant	Provincial constable / Detective constable 1st to 4th class
Insignia (slip-on)									
Insignia (shoulder board)									

Title	Special constable	Special constable	Auxiliary constable
Insignia			
Notes	GHQ security, Queen's Park security	Digital forensics, forensic investigators, court security, offender transport	Auxiliary policing program

Historic now defunct ranks:

- Staff superintendent
- Divisional inspector
- Cadet

=== Toronto Police Service and York Regional Police ===
The rank insignia of the Toronto Police Service is similar to that used by police services elsewhere in Canada and in the United Kingdom, except that the usual "pips" are replaced by maple leaves. The St. Edward's Crown is found on insignia of staff sergeant, all superintendent ranks and all commanding officer ranks. The same rank insignia are also used by the York Regional Police.

Rank	Commanding officers		Senior officers				Police officers			Officers in training
Rank	Chief of police	Deputy chief of police	Staff superintendent	Superintendent	Staff inspector	Inspector	Staff sergeant	Sergeant	Constable	Cadet
Insignia (slip-on)										
Insignia (shoulder board)							Shoulder boards not used for these ranks			

=== Ottawa Police Service ===
Rank	Commanding officers		Senior officers		Police officers					
Rank	Chief of police	Deputy chief of police	Superintendent	Inspector	Staff sergeant	Sergeant	First class constable	Second class constable	Third class constable	Fourth class constable
Insignia (slip-on)										
Insignia (shoulder board)					Shoulder boards not used for these ranks					

=== Peel Regional Police ===
Rank	Commanding officers		Senior officers				Police officers							Recruits
Rank	Chief of police	Deputy chief of police	Staff superintendent	Superintendent	Staff inspector (not currently in use)	Inspector	Staff sergeant	Sergeant	Senior police constable	Police constable first class	Police constable second class	Police constable third class	Police constable fourth class	Police cadet
Insignia (slip-on)														No insignia
Insignia (shoulder board)							Shoulder boards not used for these ranks							

Rank	Special constables	
Rank	Special constable supervisor	Special constable
Insignia (slip-on)		

=== Kingston Police ===
Rank	Commanding officers		Senior officers				Police officers		
Rank	Chief of police	Deputy chief of police	Superintendent	Staff Inspector	Inspector	Staff sergeant	Sergeant	Senior police constable	Constable
Insignia (slip-on)									
Insignia (shoulder board)						Shoulder boards not used for these ranks			

=== Cobourg Police Service ===
Rank	Commanding officers		Senior officers			Police officers
Rank	Chief of police	Deputy chief of police	Inspector	Staff sergeant	Sergeant	Constable
Insignia						
Insignia (shoulder board)				Shoulder boards are not used for these ranks.		

- Detective sergeant
- Detective
- Detective constable

=== Durham Regional Police Service ===
- Chief of police
- Deputy chief
- Chief administrative officer
- Superintendent
- Inspector
- Detective sergeant
- Staff sergeant
- Detective
- Sergeant
- Detective constable
- Senior constable
- Constable - 1st class
- Constable - 2nd class
- Constable - 3rd class
- Constable - 4th class
- Special court constables

=== Halton Regional Police Service ===
- Chief of police
- Deputy chief
- Superintendent
- Inspector
- Staff sergeant / detective sergeant
- Sergeant / detective
- Police constable / detective constable

=== Waterloo Regional Police Service ===
- Chief of police (crown and three maple leaves)
- Deputy chief (crown and two maple leaves)
- Superintendent (crown)
- Inspector (two maple leaves)
- Staff sergeant (crown and three chevrons)
- Sergeant (three chevrons)
- Constable

=== West Grey Police ===
- Chief of police
- Inspector
- Sergeant / Detective
- Special Constable
- Constable
- Auxiliary constable

== Prince Edward Island ==
=== Charlottetown Police Service ===
- Chief of police
- Deputy chief
- Superintendent
- Inspector
- Staff sergeant
- Sergeant
- Corporal
- Constable

=== Summerside Police Service ===
- Chief of police
- Deputy chief
- Staff sergeant
- Sergeant
- Corporals
- Constable

=== Kensington Police Service ===
- Chief of police
- Deputy chief
- Corporal
- Constable

== Quebec ==
=== Sûreté du Québec (SQ) ===
Ranks of Sûreté du Québec
General staff officers		Officers				Sub-Officers	Agents	
Directeur general	Directeur adjoint	Inspecteur chef	Inspecteur	Capitaine	Lieutenant	Sergent	Chef d'equipe	Agent
Director general of the SQ	Associate director	Chief inspector	Inspector	Captain	Lieutenant	Sergeant	Team leader	Constable
								No insignia

=== Kativik Regional Police ===
Ranks and insignia of the Kativik Regional Police Force are similar to those of Sûreté du Québec.

Ranks of Kativik Regional Police
Officers			Sub-Officers	Agents
Chef	Chef deputé	Capitaine	Sergent	Agent
Chief	Deputy Chief	Captain	Sergeant	Constable
				No insignia

=== Service de police de la Ville de Montréal (SPVM) ===
Ranks of the Service de police de la Ville de Montréal:

Rank Group	Executive Officers		Staff Officers			Superior Officers	Officers	Constables
SPVM
SPVM	Directeur; Director	Directeur-adjoint; Associate Director	Inspecteur-chef; Chief Inspector	Inspecteur; Inspector	Commandant; Commander	Lieutenant; Lieutenant	Sergent; Sergeant	Agent sénior Senior Constable	Agent; Constable

=== Service de police de la Ville de Laval ===
- Director (directeur)
- Associate director (directeur-adjoint)
- Assistant director (assistant-directeur)
- Chief inspector (inspecteur chef)
- Inspector (inspecteur)
- Lieutenant / detective lieutenant (lieutenant/lieutenant détective)
- Sergeant / detective sergeant (sergent/sergent détective)
- Constable (agent)

=== Service de police de la Ville de Québec (SPVQ) ===
- Director (directeur)
- Associate director (directeur-adjoint)
- Lieutenant (lieutenant)
- Sergeant (sergent)
- Constable (agent)

=== Service de Police de la Ville de Gatineau (SPVG) ===
- Director (directeur)
- Associate director (directeur-adjoint)
- Chief inspector (inspecteur chef)
- Inspector (inspecteur)
- Lieutenant / detective lieutenant (lieutenant/lieutenant détective)
- Group leader (chef de groupe)
- Sergeant / detective sergeant (sergent/sergent détective)
- Team leader (chef d'équipe)
- Constable with superior function (agent fonction supérieure)
- Constable (agent)

== Saskatchewan ==
=== Regina Police Service ===
The Regina Police Service is a police force in the Canadian province of Saskatchewan that has the following ranks:

Chief	Deputy chief	Superintendent	Inspector	Staff sergeant	Sergeant	Corporal	Constable	Special constable

=== Saskatoon Police Service ===
The Saskatoon Police Service is made up of the following ranks:

Chief	Deputy chief	Superintendent	Inspector	Staff sergeant	Sergeant	Constable	Special constable

=== Weyburn Police Service ===
The Weyburn Police Service is a Canadian Police Service in the Province of Saskatchewan.

- Chief constable
- Deputy chief
- Sergeant
- Corporal
- Constable

== Specialized police services ==
=== Niagara Parks Police Service ===
- Chief of police
- Inspector
- Sergeant
- Constable
- Communications officer
- Provincial offences officer

=== Nishnawbe-Aski Police Service ===
The Nishnawbe-Aski Police Service (NAPS) is the police agency for Nishnawbe-Aski Nation (NAN).

- Chief of police
- Deputy chief
- Regional inspector / regional commander
- Administrative sergeant
- Staff sergeant
- Sergeant (detective sergeant, road sergeant)
- Constable (detective constable)

=== Transit Enforcement Unit ===
The Transit Enforcement Unit (TEU; formerly known as the Special Constable Services Department) is the transit law enforcement and corporate security unit of the Toronto Transit Commission (TTC) in Toronto.

- Chief special constable
- Staff sergeant (patrol / system security / fare inspection / training and logistical support)
- Sergeant (patrol / fare inspection / training and logistical support)
- Special constable (patrol)
- Protective services guard (security / revenue protection)
- Fare inspector (provincial offences officer)

=== University of Toronto Campus Community Police Service ===
- Director
- Associate director
- Staff sergeant
- Sergeant (rank currently not in use)
- Corporal (platoon / shift supervisor)
- Special constables / constables (1st to 4th class)
- Building patroller (security guard, not designated special constables)

=== Toronto Community Housing Community Safety Unit (CSU) ===
- Chief
- Deputy Chief
- Inspector (rank currently not in use)
- Staff sergeant
- Sergeant
- Corporal (Trainers, Field Intelligence Officers)
- Special Constable (1st to 4th class)
- Special Constable In-Training

== Auxiliary police ==
Different Canadian auxiliary police programs use various ranks, including some of the following:

- Auxiliary staff superintendent
- Auxiliary superintendent
- Auxiliary staff inspector
- Auxiliary inspector
- Auxiliary sergeant major
- Auxiliary staff sergeant
- Auxiliary sergeant
- Auxiliary constable

== Former police forces ==
=== Alberta Provincial Police ===
The Alberta Provincial Police was a police force active in Alberta, Canada, from 1917 until 1932.

- Commissioner
- Superintendent
- Assistant superintendent
- Inspector
- Detective
- Sergeant
- Constable

=== Newfoundland Ranger Force ===
The Newfoundland Ranger Force was the police force of the Dominion of Newfoundland before its confederation with Canada.

- Chief ranger
- Lieutenant
- Inspector
- Staff sergeant
- Sergeant
- Corporal
- Ranger 1st class
- Ranger 2nd class
- Ranger 3rd class

=== North-West Mounted Police ===
Commissioned officers
1870–1900	Commissioner	Deputy commissioner	Assistant commissioner	Chief superintendent	Superintendent	Inspector	Sub-inspector

Other ranks
1870s	Chief constable	Staff constable		Constable	Sub-constable
1880s–1890s	Sergeant major	Staff sergeant	Sergeant	Corporal	Constable
1900s	Sergeant major	Staff sergeant	Sergeant	Corporal	Constable
