= Police ranks of the United Kingdom =

System of hierarchical relationships in police organisations

Police ranks are a system of hierarchical relationships in police organisations. The rank system defines authority and responsibility in a police organisation, and affects the culture within the police force. Usually, uniforms denote the bearer's rank by particular insignia affixed to the uniforms.

Most of the police forces of the United Kingdom (including those of the British Overseas Territories and the Crown Dependencies) use a standardised set of ranks. However, as law enforcement in the United Kingdom is organised separately in the three jurisdictions of England and Wales, Northern Ireland, and Scotland, and as most law enforcement is carried out by police officers serving in regional police services known as territorial police forces, some variations in rank organisation, insignia and responsibilities may occur within the United Kingdom. An example of this is the slight variations in the most senior ranks of the Metropolitan Police and the City of London Police. Parallel to the regional services are UK-wide agencies, such as the British Transport Police and the national specialist units of certain territorial police forces, with a possibility of further variations.

Due to policing in many countries developing from military organisations and operations, police ranks in many countries follow a logic similar to that of military ranks. Most of the British police ranks that exist today were, however, deliberately chosen by Home Secretary Sir Robert Peel so that they did not correspond with military ranking. They were enacted under the Metropolitan Police Act 1829.

== Powers ==
In law, every attested police officer is a constable whatever their actual rank, in the sense that officers of any rank have the same powers of arrest. The basic police powers of arrest and search of an ordinary constable are identical to those of a superintendent or chief constable; however certain higher ranks are given administrative powers to authorise certain police actions. In England and Wales, these include the powers to:

- authorise the continued detention of up to 24 hours of a person arrested for an offence and brought to a police station (granted to custody officers at designated police stations),
- authorise section 18 (1) PACE searches of premises (granted to inspectors and above),
- extend the length of prisoner detention to 36 hours (granted to superintendents and above),
- extend the length of bail from a police station to three months (granted to inspectors) or up to six months (granted to superintendents and above)
- authorise section 35 Anti-social Behaviour, Crime and Policing Act 2014 dispersal powers to constables within a specified locality not exceeding 48 hours (granted to inspectors and above)
- designating a locality not exceeding 24 hours whereas the wearing of clothing that conceals another's identity within that specified locality is an offence (granted to inspectors and above), sections 157 to 159 Crime and Policing Act 2026
- authorising the use of section 60 Criminal Justice and Public Order Act 1994 stop and searches within a specified locality to constables not exceeding 24 hours (granted to inspectors and above)
- authorising constables to demand the removal of face coverings section 60AA Criminal Justice and Public Order Act 1994 within a specified locality not exceeding 24 hours (granted to inspectors and above)

In relation to police officers of the Home Office or territorial police forces of England and Wales, section 30 of the Police Act 1996 states that "a member of a police force shall have all the powers and privileges of a Constable throughout England and Wales and the adjacent United Kingdom waters". Police officers do not need to be on duty to exercise their powers and can act off-duty if circumstances require it (technically placing themselves back on duty). Officers from the police forces of Scotland and Northern Ireland and non-territorial special police forces have different jurisdictions. See List of law enforcement agencies in the United Kingdom, Crown Dependencies and British Overseas Territories for a fuller description of jurisdictions. The BTP have policing rights as a Constable.

== Detective, reserve and other rank types ==
=== Detectives ===
Officers holding ranks up to and including chief superintendent who are members of the Criminal Investigation Department (CID) or Special Branch (and certain other units) have the prefix "detective" before their rank. Due to the nature of their duties, these officers generally wear plain clothes (except for ceremonial purposes) and so do not wear the corresponding rank insignia; however, they still operate within the same structure as their uniformed counterparts.

In the UK, detective ranks are not superior to those of uniformed officers, and a detective has the same powers and authority as a uniformed officer of the same rank. The "detective" prefix designates that the officer has received suitable training and passed related examinations to conduct serious or complex criminal investigations.

=== Special constables ===
There are various grades of special constable which assist in the tasking and management of the constabulary. The ranks are management grades; those holding them are not "sergeants" or "inspectors" for the purposes of the law (for example, authorisations to order the removal of disguises or to set up roadblocks). Originally, specials held the same ranks and used the same rank insignia as regular officers, but there was a general shift to distinct terms such as "area officer" and "divisional officer" in the 1980s. However, since 2000, the National Policing Improvement Agency has encouraged special constabularies to return to rank structures and epaulette insignia identical to their regular counterparts. Although most forces have now reverted to regular rank titles (with the prefix "special"), only some have reverted to regular rank insignia. Senior special constables have no authority over regular officers, but very experienced officers may occasionally be given administrative supervision of mixed units of regular and special constables for certain events where no regular supervisory officer is available.

=== Trainee, temporary, acting and interim ranks ===
Constables who are training to become detective constables sometimes bear the title trainee investigator (T/I) or trainee detective constable (T/DC).

The term "temporary" before a rank (such as temporary detective sergeant, abbreviated T/DS) denotes an officer who has been temporarily promoted to a rank (and so who does actually hold that rank, albeit on a temporary basis), whilst the term "acting" (for example, acting inspector, abbreviated A/Insp) denotes an officer who is performing the role of a higher rank than the one actually held (sometimes informally termed "acting up"). Temporary ranks are often used for set periods (for example, a six-month appointment to a particular role), whereas acting ranks, although sometimes held for extended periods, are often used for a very short time (such as a single shift when additional supervisory officers are required, or to replace an officer on short-term leave). There has also been use of the term "interim" before a rank for an officer that holds the rank substantively, but for a set period, such as during recruitment for a permanent office-holder.

Under section 107 of the Police and Criminal Evidence Act 1984 (England and Wales only), sergeants and chief inspectors may be designated (by an officer of at least the rank of superintendent) to exercise the powers of an inspector or a superintendent respectively. Such a designation will generally accompany such an officer being given an acting rank, so for most operational purposes there is no difference between substantive, temporary and acting ranks at Inspector and above (although there may be differences as to pay, pensions and insignia). However, under section 36 of that act, only substantive sergeants may be appointed custody officers.

== Rank as related to officer identification numbers ==
All officers have a unique identification number. These are usually referred to as shoulder or collar numbers, referring to the fact that they were once worn on the uniform collar and later on the epaulettes by constables and sergeants. Uniformed officers in many forces still wear them on the epaulettes, but other forces have badges or other ways of displaying their identification numbers. Kent Police, for instance, refers to its numbers as force numbers and officers wear them on a velcro tab on their stab vest or on a badge attached to their shirt or tunic. Officers in all forces of the rank of inspector or above do not usually wear their numbers.

In most forces these identification numbers are simple numbers, with one to five digits.

The Metropolitan Police and Police Scotland, as well as a few other forces, use a letter and number system:

Metropolitan Police:

- Sergeant: Borough code and one, two or three digits
- Constable: Borough code and three or four digits
- Special constable: Borough code and four digits, usually beginning with the number 5 (8 for traffic/transport or 9 for specialist units)
- PCSO: Borough code and four digits, the first digit being a 7

Police Scotland:

- Sergeant and constable: Division letter and three or four digits
- Special constable: Division letter and four digits, the first digit being a 7

In the Metropolitan Police, the borough code is a two-letter code which follows the digits (but displayed above them on epaulettes). Before the reorganisation into boroughs, each division had a different code, with sergeants having two-digit numbers and constables having three-digit numbers.

== Rank insignia ==
Badges of rank are usually worn on the epaulettes. However, when in their formal uniform sergeants wear their rank insignia on their upper sleeves. When police tunics had closed collars (not open collars as worn with ties), constables and sergeants did not wear epaulettes but had their divisional call number on their collar (hence they are still often referred to as collar numbers). Sergeants wore their stripes on their upper sleeve. Inspectors and more senior ranks wore epaulettes at a much earlier stage, although they once wore their rank insignia on their collars. Most forces no longer use divisional call numbers, and retain only the collar number and rank insignia.

=== Great Britain ===
Senior officers usually wear distinguishing marks around the outer edge of the peaks of their caps (or under the capbadge for female officers, who do not wear peaked caps). Normally this is a raised black band for inspectors and chief inspectors, a silver (gold in the City of London Police) band for superintendents and chief superintendents, and a row of silver oak leaves for chief officers. Chief constables, the Commissioner of the City of London Police, and all commissioner ranks of the Metropolitan Police wear oak leaves on both the outer and inner edges of their peaks (or a double row beneath the capbadge for female officers). In Scotland, however, the mark is a silver band for inspectors and chief inspectors, a silver band and silver oak leaves on the outer and inner edges of the peak respectively for superintendents and chief superintendents, and silver oak leaves on the outer and inner edges of the peak for all chief officers.

Additionally, officers at or above the rank of commander or assistant chief constable wear gorget patches on the collars of their tunics. The gorget patches are patterned after those worn by general officers of the British Army and Royal Marines; the police versions, however, are of silver on black (gold on black in the City of London Police) rather than gold on red, in keeping with the police uniform colours.

The ranks below are used by all territorial forces in the United Kingdom, and the specialist national forces: the British Transport Police, Ministry of Defence Police, and Civil Nuclear Constabulary. Other specialist forces, and those outside of the United Kingdom (including British Overseas Territories such as Bermuda and Gibraltar, which are parts of the British sovereign territory in most of which internal competencies of governance are mostly delegated to local governments, and the Crown Dependencies of the Channel Islands and the Isle of Man, which are not parts of the British sovereign territory) use the same general system, but often have fewer senior ranks.

Chief constable is the title of the head of each United Kingdom territorial police force except the Metropolitan Police and City of London Police, which are headed by commissioners. Ranks above chief superintendent are usually non-operational management roles, and are often referred to as "chief officer" ranks, but the longer phrase "chief police officer" or similar in legislation is specifically a commissioner or chief constable, a "senior police officer" being their immediate deputy. The Commissioner of the Metropolitan Police is often considered to be the highest police rank within the United Kingdom, although in reality every chief constable and the two commissioners are supreme over their own forces and are not answerable to any other officer.

Epaulettes are normally black with white sewn on or silver metal insignia, although high-visibility uniforms are often yellow with black insignia.

==== Epaulette insignia ====
Great Britain police ranks and insignia
| Rank | Chief constable | Deputy chief constable | Assistant chief constable | Chief superintendent | Superintendent | Chief inspector | Inspector | Sergeant | Constable |
|---|---|---|---|---|---|---|---|---|---|
| Epaulette insignia | | | | | | | | | |

==== Uniform insignia ====
The rank of an officer can be found in varying details of the uniform such as headgear, sleeve patches and tunic collar details.
Insignia on hats and uniforms can vary between forces within the UK and the following tables below will not accurately represent all constabularies within the UK.

Great Britain police formal uniform
| Rank | Chief constable | | | Deputy chief constable | Assistant chief constable | Chief superintendent | Superintendent | Chief inspector | Inspector | Sergeant | Constable |
| Rank | Commissioner | Deputy commissioner | Assistant commissioner | Deputy assistant commissioner | Commander | Chief superintendent | Superintendent | Chief inspector | Inspector | Sergeant | Constable |
| Uniform insignia | | | | | | | | | | | |
| Note | The epaulettes will change between ranks with the same uniform design | | | | | | | | | | |

Great Britain police officer headwear
| Rank | Chief constable | | | | Deputy chief constable | Assistant chief constable | Chief superintendent | Superintendent | Chief inspector | Inspector | Sergeant | Constable | Police community support officer |
| Rank | Commissioner | Deputy commissioner | Assistant commissioner | Deputy assistant commissioner | Commander | | Chief superintendent | Superintendent | Chief inspector | Inspector | Sergeant | Constable | Police community support officer |
| Female patrol | | | | | | | | | | | | | |
| Female traffic officer | | | | | | | | | | | | | |
| Male foot patrol | | | | | | | | | | | | | |
| Male mobile patrol | | | | | | | | | | | | | |
| Male traffic officer | | | | | | | | | | | | | |
| Notes | Hats worn by inspectors and chief inspectors have raised black bands along the outer edge of the peaks for male officers or black arcs below the cap badges for female officers.; All English and Welsh forces retain the custodian helmet and other traditional headwear for ceremonial duties. | | | | | | | | | | | | |

==== British Transport Police ====
As a variation to the standard set, the deputy chief constable of the British Transport Police wears two rows of oak leaves on their hat.

=== Northern Ireland ===
The Police Service of Northern Ireland (PSNI) adopted the same rank system as elsewhere in the United Kingdom on 1 June 1970, but has a different version of the rank insignia, with the star from the PSNI badge replacing the crown. Unusually, the star is worn below the pip by chief superintendents and by the chief constable, who wears both symbols above his tipstaves. The PSNI has retained the RUC's distinctive inverted (point-up) sergeants' chevrons, worn on the lower sleeve in formal uniform. PSNI officers do not wear the custodian helmet and female officers wear a different hat from other forces.

The PSNI rank structure and epaulette insignia is the same as the territorial police in Great Britain, except that the crown is replaced with the design from the PSNI badge and sergeants' chevrons are point up. In addition, the epaulettes are green rather than black; this is to match their green uniforms.

Police Service of Northern Ireland ranks and insignia
| Rank | Chief constable | Deputy chief constable | Assistant chief constable | Chief superintendent | Superintendent | Chief inspector | Inspector | Sergeant | Constable |
|---|---|---|---|---|---|---|---|---|---|
| Epaulette insignia | | | | | | PSNI chief inspector | | | |

Headgear rank marking is the same as for England and Wales.

=== Scotland ===
Police Scotland headwear is slightly different for the following ranks:

- Inspectors and chief inspectors wear a hat with a silver band instead of a black one.
- Superintendents and chief superintendents wear a row of oak leaves within the silver band.
- Assistant chief constables and deputy chief constables wear two rows of oak leaves.

=== Territorial police forces variations ===
==== City of London Police ====
City of London Police ranks and insignia
| Rank | Commissioner | Deputy commissioner | Commander | Chief superintendent | Superintendent | Chief inspector | Inspector | Sergeant | Constable |
|---|---|---|---|---|---|---|---|---|---|
| Insignia | | | | | | | | | |
| Note | City of London Police insignia are worn on square patches on the upper arm of working dress or on the epaulettes in more formal dress. | | | | | | | | |

City of London Police insignia are gold where that of other forces is silver. For example, rank insignia and collar numbers on epaulettes are gold, as are the bands and oak leaves on the caps of senior officers, and officers of or above the rank of commander wear gold-on-black gorget patches on the collars of their tunics.

The City of London Police also previously had variations for some acting ranks such as sergeant and inspector: acting sergeants wore their chevrons above their divisional letters (or later "CP" for all officers, following the abolition of the force's divisions), whereas substantive sergeants wear them below their collar numbers. Acting inspectors were denoted by a crown in the place of their divisional letters, whilst keeping their collar number and chevrons.

The City of London Police use a different colour scheme for their police headwear. Instead of the black and white sillitoe tartan they use red and white. The assistant commissioner and commander wear a single row of oak leaves on their hats, and only the commissioner wears two rows.

==== Merseyside Police ====
Inspectors and chief inspectors in Merseyside Police wear silver instead of black lace on their hats, as did Liverpool City Police before them.

==== Metropolitan Police ====
Metropolitan Police Service ranks and insignia
| Rank | Commissioner | Deputy commissioner | Assistant commissioner | Deputy assistant commissioner | Commander | Chief superintendent | Superintendent | Chief inspector | Inspector | Sergeant | Constable |
| Epaulette insignia | | | | | | | | | | | |

The Metropolitan Police uses different ranks above chief superintendent. The fabric used in the crowns is blue, whereas other police forces use red. Although they rank as deputy chief constables, deputy assistant commissioners wear two rows of oak leaves on their hats.

=== Isle of Man Constabulary ===
==== Epaulette insignia ====
The Isle of Man police ranks follow the structure of other British police rank structures however it is notably missing the chief superintendent and assistant chief constable ranks within their own structure. The epaulettes for the constables and sergeants also have an addition of the Isle of Man Constabulary logo and motto above their collar numbers. Headgear rank marking is the same as for England and Wales.

Isle of Man Constabulary ranks and insignia
| Rank | Chief constable | Deputy chief constable | Superintendent | Chief inspector | Inspector | Sergeant | Constable |
|---|---|---|---|---|---|---|---|
| Epaulette insignia | Isle of Man Police Chief Constable Epaulette | Isle of Man Police Deputy Chief Constable Epaulette | Isle of Man Police Superintendant Epaulette | Isle of Man Police Chief Inspector Epaulette | Isle of Man Police Inspector Epaulette | Isle of Man Police Sergeant Epaulette | Isle of Man Police Constable Epaulette |

=== Special constabularies insignia ===
Special constabulary epaulettes frequently bear the letters SC (with or without a crown above) to differentiate them from regular officers. Within the City of London Special Constabulary is the Honourable Artillery Company Specials; members of this unit wear HAC on the shoulders in addition to other insignia. Senior special constables wear the same markings on their hats as equivalent regular ranks.

Special constabularies using the NPIA approved rank insignia
| Constabulary | Chief officer | Deputy chief officer | Special superintendent | Special chief inspector | Special inspector | Special sergeant | Special constable | Notes |
| Durham Special Constabulary | | | | | | | | The special superintendent is not currently in use. |
| Hampshire Special Constabulary | | | | | | | | Collar numbers begin with a 9 |
| Kent Special Constabulary | | | | | | | | The ranks of special constable and special sergeant feature the force emblems. |
| Merseyside Special Constabulary | | | | | NPIA Special inspector insignia | | | |
| Northamptonshire Special Constabulary | | | | | | | | |
| South Wales Special Constabulary | | | | | | | | South Wales Police issue special constabulary officers with the prefix of 7 for their collar numbers. |
| South Yorkshire Special Constabulary | | | | | | | | |
| Wiltshire Special Constabulary | | | | | | | | |
| Gloucestershire Special Constabulary | | | | | | | | Proposed new insignia in 2019 |
| City of London Special Constabulary | | | | | | | | The Honourable Artillery Company special constables wear the letters HAC in addition.; The deputy chief officer of the special constabulary rank is named "special chief superintendent".; The chief officer of the special constabulary is named "special commander". |
| Notes | Blank spaces in the table indicate that a rank is not used in a force's structure.; This table of constabularies is not complete. | | | | | | | |

There is a large variation in the design of epaulettes used across Great Britain for specials. This has been recognised at national level and as part of the Special Constabulary National Strategy 2018–2023 the structure and insignia is under review with the intention to standardise. Other special constabularies use combinations of bars, half bars, pips, crowns, laurel wreaths, collar numbers, force crests and the SC identity (with or without a crown) to distinguish ranks (and/or role).

Special constabularies using the alternative "bar style" rank insignia
| Constabulary | Chief officer | Deputy chief officer | Assistant chief officer | Special chief superintendent | Special superintendent | Special chief inspector | Special inspector | Special sergeant | Special constable | Notes |
| Avon and Somerset Special Constabulary | | | | | | | | | | |
| Bedfordshire Special Constabulary | | | | | | | | | | |
| British Transport Police | | | | | | | | | Special constable rank insignia | |
| Cambridgeshire Special Constabulary | | | | | | | | | | |
| Cheshire Special Constabulary | | | | | | | | | | |
| Cleveland Special Constabulary | | | | | | | | | | |
| Cumbria Special Constabulary | | | | | | | | | | All special constable collar numbers start with a 6 or a 7; The deputy chief officer rank is currently vacant; The chief officer rank is currently vacant |
| Derbyshire Special Constabulary | | | | | | | | | | |
| Devon and Cornwall Special Constabulary | | | | | | | | | | |
| Dorset Special Constabulary | | | | | | | | | | |
| Dyfed-Powys Special Constabulary | | | | | | | | | | |
| Essex Special Constabulary | | | | | | | | | | |
| Gloucestershire Special Constabulary | | | | | | | | | | |
| Greater Manchester Special Constabulary | | | | | | | | | | |
| Gwent Special Constabulary | | | | | | | | | | |
| Hertfordshire Special Constabulary | | | | | | | | | | |
| Lancashire Special Constabulary | | | | | | | | | | Regular police sergeant acts as a chief officer |
| Leicestershire Special Constabulary | | | | | | | | | | Special chief inspector acts as special constable lead |
| Lincolnshire Special Constabulary | | | | | | | | | | |
| Metropolitan Special Constabulary | | | | | | | | | | |
| Norfolk Special Constabulary | | | | | | | | | | |
| Northumbria; Special; Constabulary | | | | | | | | | | Northumbria Special Constabulary abolished its ranks in 2006. All officers hold the rank of special constable, although those who previously held a supervisory rank are entitled to continue wearing their rank insignia. |
| North Wales Special Constabulary | | | | | | | | | | |
| Nottinghamshire Special Constabulary | | | | | | | | | | |
| Police Scotland | | | | | | | | | Special constable rank insignia | Police Scotland do not currently have a rank structure for special constables. |
| Staffordshire Special Constabulary | | | | | | | | | | |
| Suffolk Special Constabulary | | | | | | | | | | |
| Surrey; Special; Constabulary | | | | | | | | | | |
| Thames Valley Special Constabulary | | | | | | | | | | Assistant chief officer is not currently in use |
| Warwickshire Special Constabulary | | | | | | Special Chief Inspector Rank Insignia | Special Inspector Rank Insignia | | | |
| West Mercia Special Constabulary | | | | | | | | | | West Mercia Police do not currently have a rank structure for special constables. |
| West Midlands Special Constabulary | | | | | | | | | | |
| West Yorkshire Special Constabulary | | | | | | | | | | The special sergeant is known as a section officer; The special inspector is known as a senior section officer; A regular chief inspector acts as a chief officer |
| Notes | Blank spaces in the table indicate that a rank is not used in a force's structure.; This table of constabularies is not complete. | | | | | | | | | |

=== Miscellaneous police forces ===
There are, in the United Kingdom, a number of miscellaneous constabularies. These are not operated, regulated or funded by the Home Office, although they are fully authorised (by Act of Parliament) establishments. In general, they provide the policing for ports, docks, tunnels, or other particular institutions. Although these forces tend to require high standards of training and accountability, which closely mirror those of the Home Office police forces, they are usually much smaller in terms of personnel, and therefore utilise fewer of the 'standard' ranks.

==== Public order roles and rank insignia ====
Officers taking part in public order and public safety (POPS) events and incidents wear colour-coded rank slides to denote command and support roles. Bronze commanders can be of varying ranks and not just chief inspectors as shown below. Tactical advisers can also be of differing ranks, but are most commonly constables or sergeants. It is a requirement under the College of Policing Public Order Manual that all officers, regardless of rank, display an identifying number on their epaulettes. Therefore, ranks such as inspector have collar/warrant numbers displayed on their public order colour-coded epaulettes that they might not have as part of their normal uniform.

UK police public order roles and insignia
| Role | Bronze commander | PSU commander | Serial sergeant | Evidence gathering team | Medic | Tactical advisor | Serial constable |
|---|---|---|---|---|---|---|---|
| Epaulette insignia | | | | | | | |
| Variants | | | | | | | |

==== Police community support officers (PCSO) ====
Police community support officers bear epaulettes with the words "Police community support officer" and their shoulder number, or, in the Metropolitan Police, a borough identification code and shoulder number. South Yorkshire Police PCSO supervisors wear a bar above the words "Police community support officer supervisor" and the shoulder number.

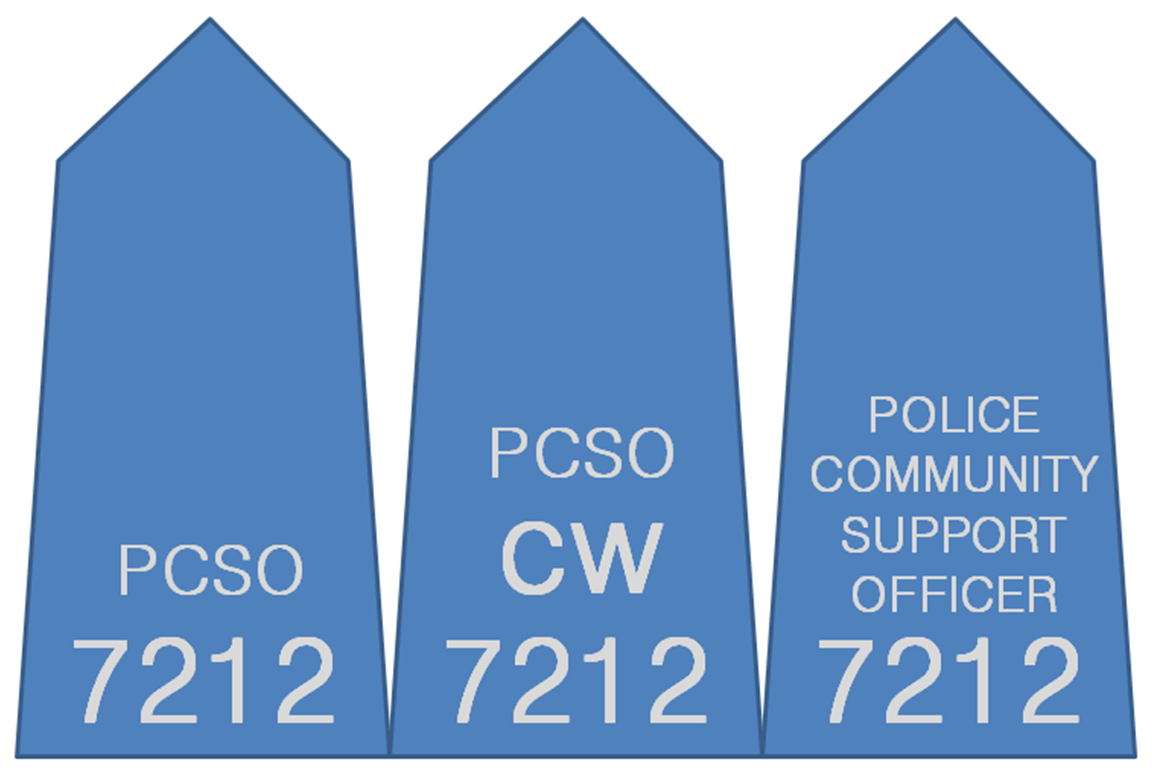
Variations of PCSO epaulettes varying between forces

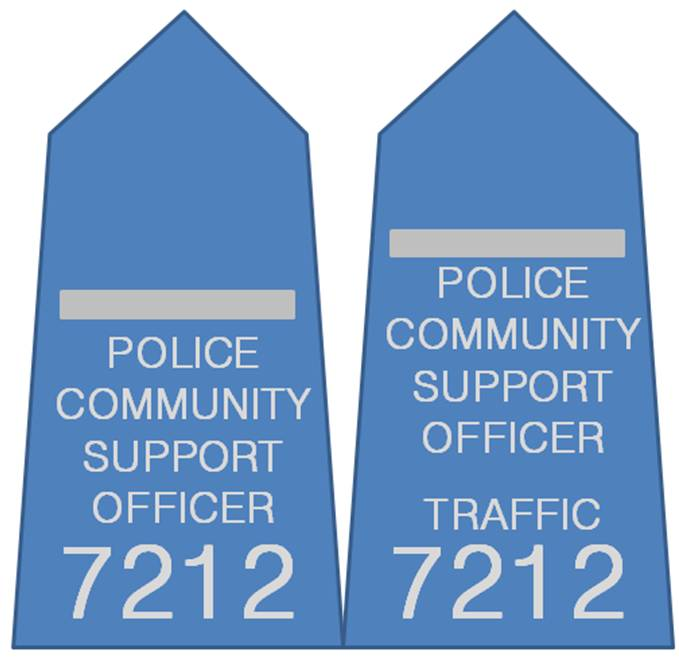
Examples of PCSO supervisor epaulettes

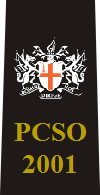
Examples of PCSO epaulettes in the City of London Police

==== Police cadets ====
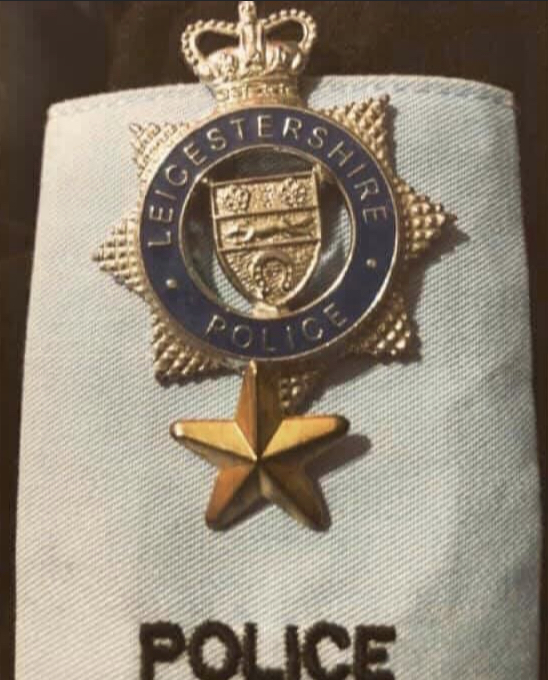
Leicestershire Police head police cadet epaulette

The following table serves as an example of ranks within volunteer police cadet schemes, which vary considerably. Cadets appointed "mayor's cadets" are given a special badge or epaulettes to wear.

Cadet ranks and insignia
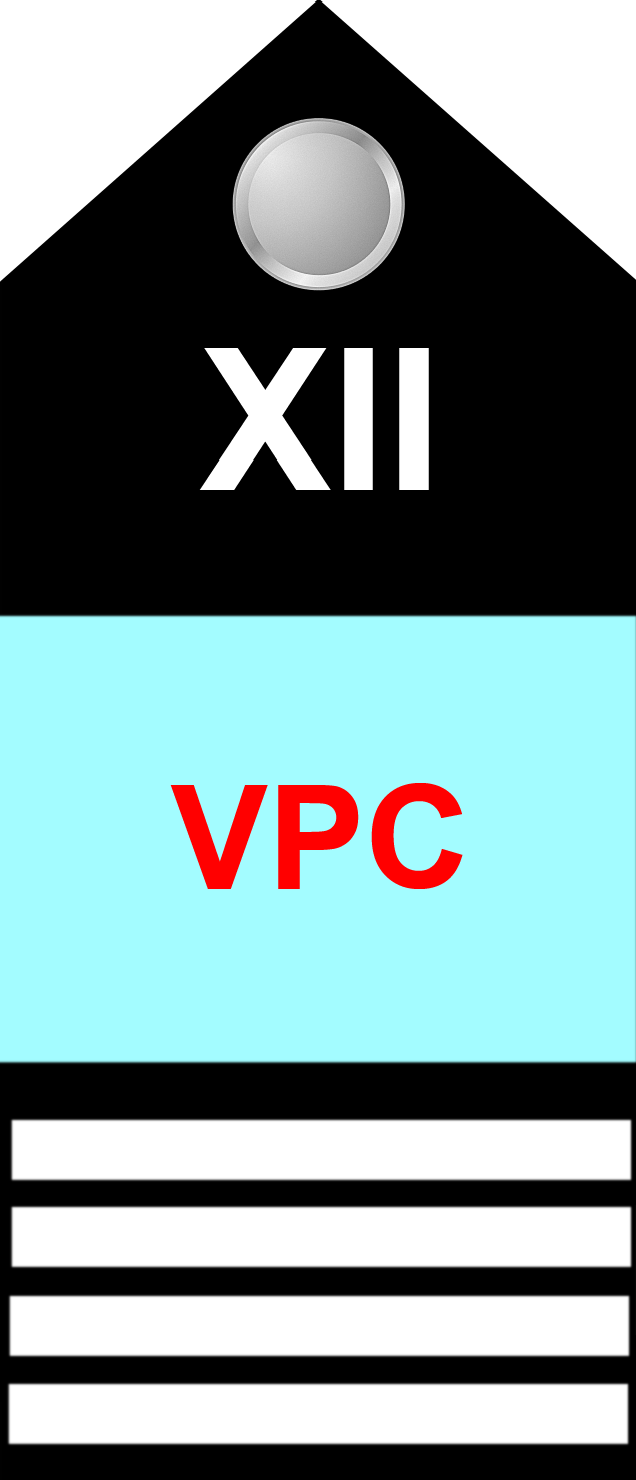
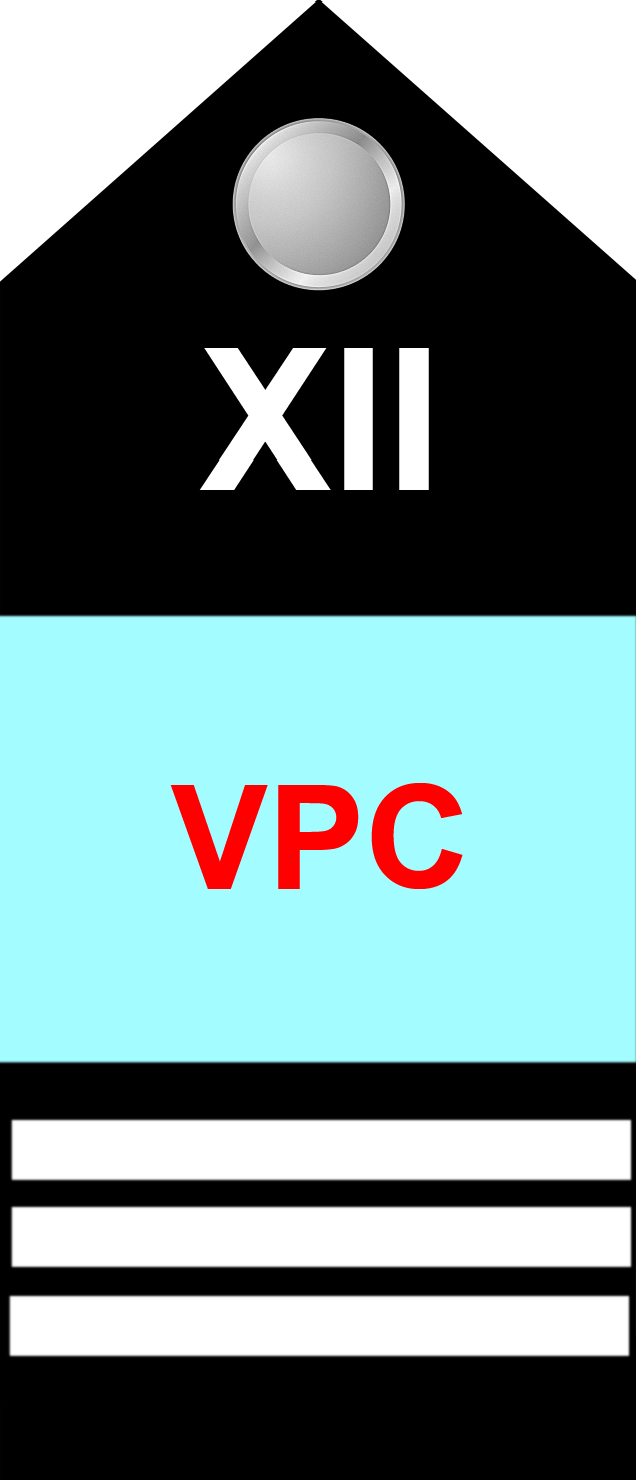
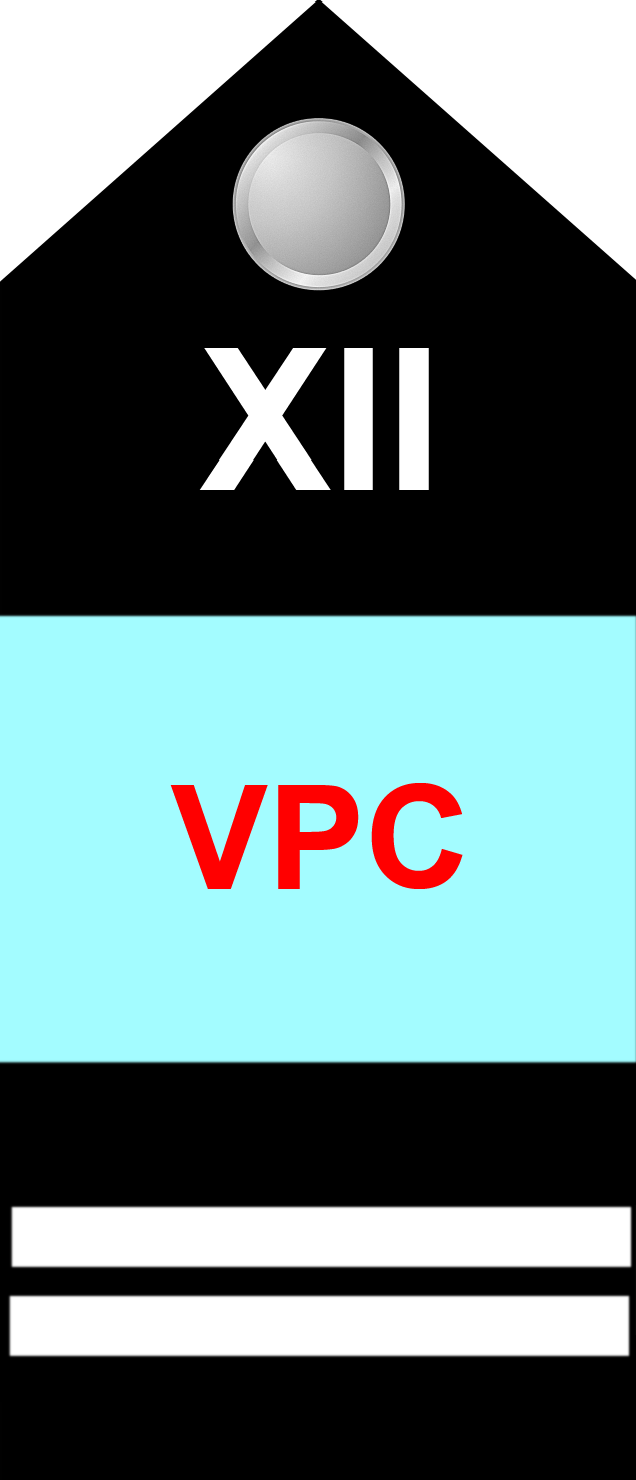
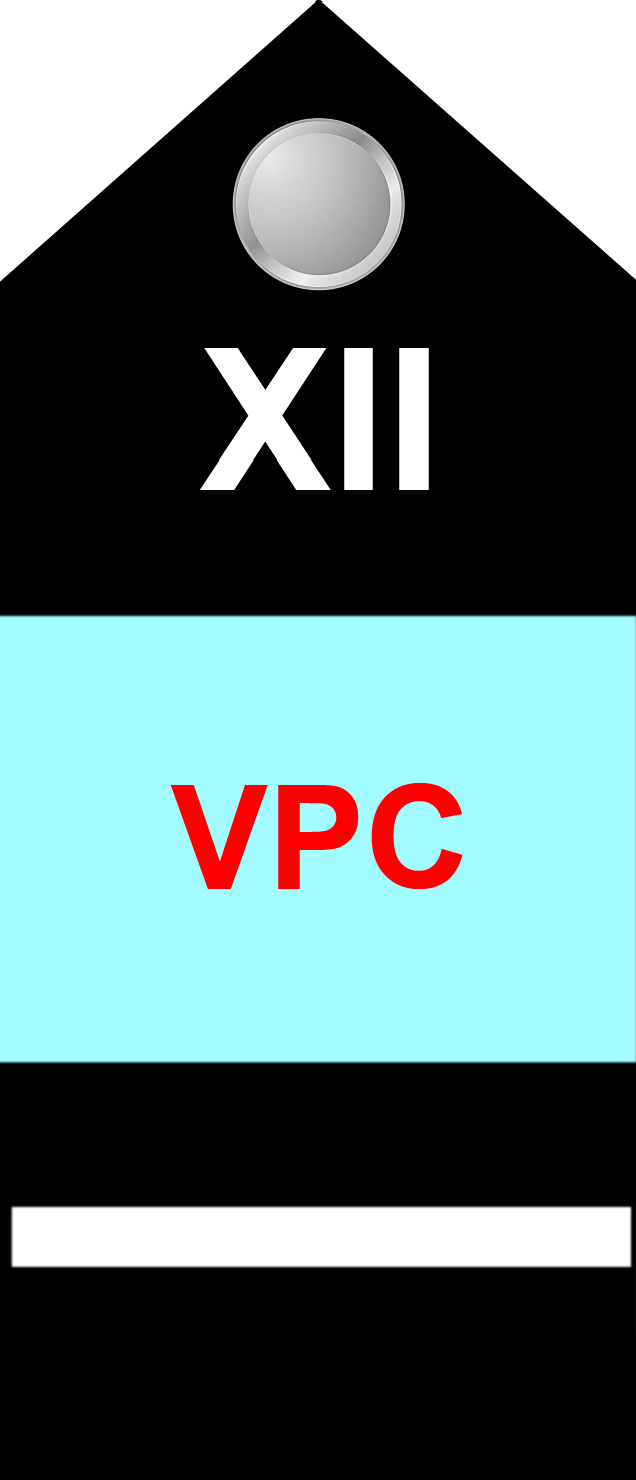
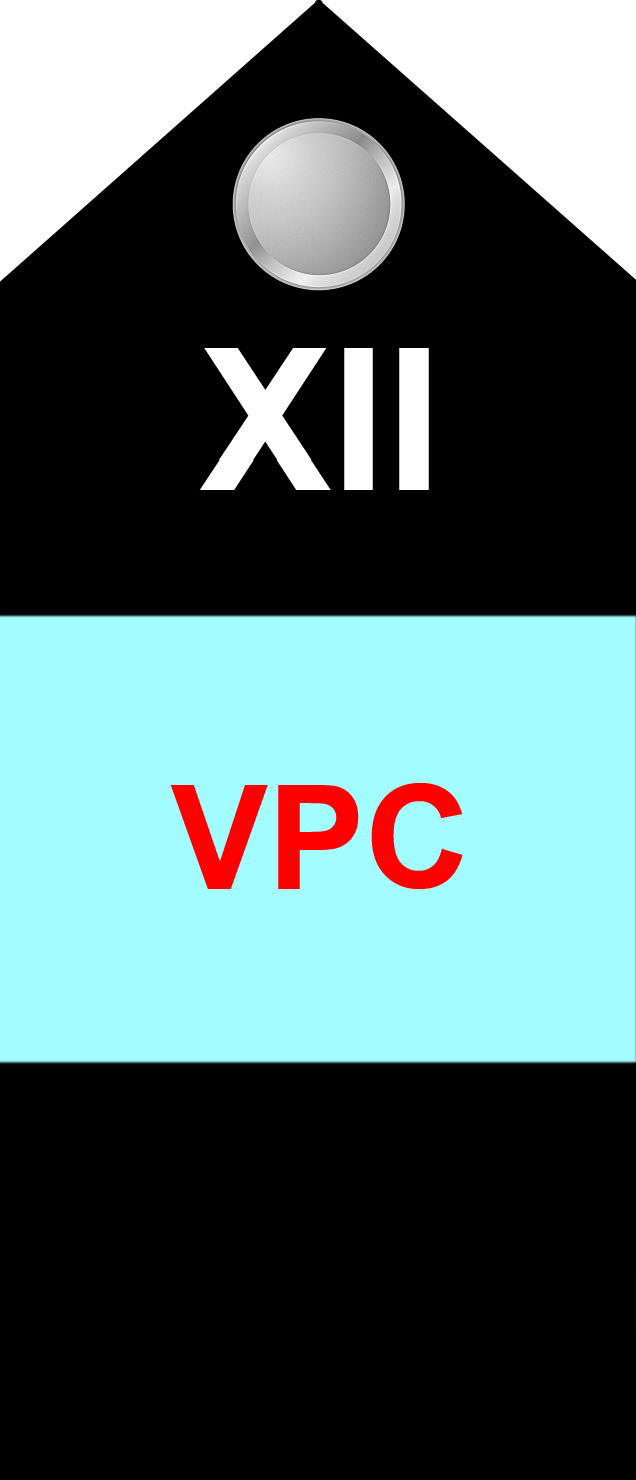
| Cadet service | Cadet under officers | Cadet senior NCOs | | | | Cadet junior NCOs | | Cadets | Recruits |
Metropolitan volunteer police cadets
| Metropolitan volunteer police cadets | | | | | | | | | No insignia |
| Metropolitan volunteer police cadets | No equivalent | Head cadet | No equivalent | Deputy head cadet | No equivalent | Team leader cadet | Deputy team leader cadet | Police cadet | Recruit |
| Metropolitan volunteer police cadets | No equivalent | HCdt | No equivalent | DHCdt | No equivalent | TLCdt | DTLCdt | Cdt | Rct |
Hampshire volunteer police cadets
| Hampshire volunteer police cadets | | | | | | | | | No insignia |
| Hampshire volunteer police cadets | No equivalent | Head cadet | No equivalent | Deputy head cadet | No equivalent | Team leader cadet | No equivalent | Police cadet | Recruit |
| Hampshire volunteer police cadets | No equivalent | HCdt | No equivalent | DHCdt | No equivalent | TLCdt | No equivalent | Cdt | Rct |

== Historical police ranks ==
=== Timeline of ranks ===
All police forces have used a wide variety of ranks to meet their organisational needs, especially the Metropolitan Police Service. Ranks have been created, abolished, amalgamated and sometimes revived during the history of British policing.

In the following table, "MET only" means those ranks are specific for the Metropolitan Police.

=== Defunct rank insignia ===
The following table presents defunct rank insignia of the Metropolitan Police.

Out of commission Metropolitan Police rank insignia
| Rank | Epaulette insignia | Year introduced | Year removed | Years active |
|---|---|---|---|---|
| War reserve constable | | 1939 | 1948 | 9 |
| Station sergeant | | 1890 | 1980 | 90 |
| Junior station inspector | | 1936 | 1949 | 13 |
| Station inspector | | 1880 | 1936 | 56 |
| Station inspector | | 1936 | 1949 | 13 |
| Sub-divisional inspector | | 1880 | 1922 | 42 |
| Sub-divisional inspector | | 1922 | 1941 | 19 |
| Sub-divisional inspector | | 1941 | 1949 | 8 |
| Chief inspector | | ? | 1953 | ? |
| Superintendent | | ? | 1953 | ? |
| Superintendent grade II | | 1953 | 1974 | 21 |
| Superintendent grade I | | 1953 | 1974 | 21 |
| Chief constable | | 1886 | 1946 | 60 |
| Deputy commander | | 1946 | 1968 | 22 |
| Commander | | 1946 | 1968 | 22 |
| Deputy commissioner | | 1922 | 2001 | 79 |

== See also ==
- Australian police ranks
- Law enforcement in the United Kingdom
- List of police forces of the United Kingdom
- List of police ranks
- Police ranks in Canada
- New Zealand Police ranks
- Police uniforms and equipment in the United Kingdom
