= Australian police ranks =

Hierarchy of Australian police organisations

Australian police ranks and rank insignia are loosely based on the ranks of the United Kingdom police forces and differ between state and territory forces. Ranks listed here descend in seniority from left to right.

== Current ranks ==
	Commissioner				Superintendent			Inspector		Sergeant					Constable						Student
New South Wales; Police Force																					
New South Wales; Police Force	Commissioner	Deputy commissioner	Senior assistant commissioner	Assistant commissioner		Chief superintendent	Superintendent	Chief inspector	Inspector		Senior sergeant	Incremental sergeant	Sergeant		Leading senior constable	Incremental senior constable	Senior constable	Constable		Probationary constable	Policing student
	Commissioner				Superintendent			Inspector		Sergeant					Constable						Student
Victoria Police; 2010–present																					
Victoria Police; 2010–present	Chief commissioner	Deputy commissioner		Assistant commissioner	Commander	Chief superintendent (Note: The ranks of Chief Inspector and Chief Superintendent are no longer used or promotable.)	Superintendent	Chief inspector (Note: The ranks of Chief Inspector and Chief Superintendent are no longer used or promotable.)	Inspector		Senior sergeant		Sergeant		Leading senior constable		Senior constable	First constable	Constable	Probationary constable	
	Commissioner				Superintendent			Inspector		Sergeant					Constable						Student
Queensland Police Service; 2019–present																					
Queensland Police Service; 2019–present	Commissioner	Deputy commissioner		Assistant commissioner		Chief superintendent	Superintendent	Chief inspector (title, not rank)	Inspector	Senior sergeant – with recognition of service (Note: The 'Recognition of service' tab for each rank is not a separate rank with the Queensland Police Service, rather simply a means of highlighting the wearer's experience at that level)	Senior; Sergeant	Sergeant – with recognition of service	Sergeant		Leading senior constable (title, not rank)	Senior constable – with recognition of service	Senior constable		Constable		
	Commissioner				Superintendent			Inspector		Sergeant					Constable						Student
South Australia Police																					
South Australia Police	Commissioner	Deputy commissioner		Assistant commissioner	Commander	Chief superintendent	Superintendent	Chief inspector	Inspector	Senior sergeant first class	Senior sergeant		Sergeant	Brevet sergeant		Senior constable first class	Senior constable	Constable first class	Constable	Probationary constable	
	Commissioner				Superintendent			Inspector		Sergeant					Constable						Student
Western Australia Police; 2009–present																					
Western Australia Police; 2009–present	Commissioner	Deputy commissioner		Assistant commissioner	Commander		Superintendent		Inspector			Senior sergeant	Sergeant				Senior constable	Constable first class	Constable		
	Commissioner				Superintendent			Inspector		Sergeant					Constable						Student
Tasmania Police																					
Tasmania Police	Commissioner	Deputy commissioner		Assistant commissioner	Commander				Inspector			Senior sergeant	Sergeant			Senior constable qualified	Senior constable	First class constable	Constable		
	Commissioner				Superintendent			Inspector		Sergeant					Constable						Student
Northern Territory Police; 2019–present																					
Northern Territory Police; 2019–present	Commissioner	Deputy commissioner		Assistant commissioner	Commander		Superintendent				Senior sergeant		Sergeant				Senior constable	Constable first class			
	Commissioner				Superintendent			Inspector		Sergeant					Constable						Recruit
Australian Federal Police (ACT Policing)																					
Australian Federal Police (ACT Policing)	Commissioner	Deputy commissioner (Note: Chief of ACT Policing)	Assistant commissioner		Commander		Superintendent		Inspector		Sergeant					Leading senior constable	Senior constable	Constable first class	Constable		Police recruit
	Commissioner				Superintendent			Inspector		Supervisor					Officer				Assistant officer		
Australian Border Force																					
Australian Border Force	Commissioner of the ABF	Deputy commissioner	Assistant commissioner		Commander	Border Force chief superintendent	Border Force superintendent		Border Force inspector				Border Force supervisor			Senior Border Force officer	Leading Border Force officer	Border Force officer	Assistant Border Force officer (level 2)	Assistant Border Force officer (level 1)	

== Former ranks ==
=== Federal ===
Name	Commissioner			Superintendent				Inspector			Sergeant			Constable				
Commonwealth Police; 1917–1979; COMPOL	No equivalent			No equivalent							No equivalent			No equivalent				
Commonwealth Police; 1917–1979; COMPOL	No equivalent		Assistant commissioner	No equivalent	Chief superintendent	Senior superintendent	Superintendent	Chief inspector	Senior inspector	Inspector	No equivalent	Senior sergeant	Sergeant	No equivalent	Senior constable	Constable first class	Constable	Police recruit
ACT Policing; 1917–1979; ACTPol	No equivalent			No equivalent										No equivalent				
ACT Policing; 1917–1979; ACTPol	No equivalent		Deputy commissioner	No equivalent	Superintendent		Senior inspector	Inspector first-class		Inspector second-class	Sergeant first-class	Sergeant second-class	Sergeant third-class	No equivalent	Senior constable	Constable first class	Constable	Police recruit
Federal Police (ACT Policing); 1979–1990 AFP (ACTPol)				No equivalent										No equivalent				
Federal Police (ACT Policing); 1979–1990 AFP (ACTPol)	Commissioner	Deputy commissioner	Assistant commissioner (Note: Chief of ACT Policing)	No equivalent	Chief superintendent		Superintendent	Chief inspector		Inspector	Station sergeant (Note: Sergeant in specific roles as determined by the Commissioner)	Senior sergeant	Sergeant	No equivalent		Constable first class	Constable	Police recruit
Federal Police (ACT Policing); 1990–2019; AFP (ACTPol)					No equivalent			No equivalent				No equivalent						
Federal Police (ACT Policing); 1990–2019; AFP (ACTPol)	Commissioner	Deputy commissioner	Assistant commissioner (Note: Chief of ACT Policing)	Commander	No equivalent		Superintendent	No equivalent			Station sergeant (Note: Sergeant in specific roles as determined by the Commissioner)	No equivalent	Sergeant	Leading senior constable	Senior constable	Constable first class	Constable	Police recruit

=== Victoria ===
Name	Commissioner			Commander	Superintendent		Inspector		Sergeant		Constable		
Victoria Police circa 1984													
Victoria Police circa 1984	Chief commissioner	Deputy commissioner	Assistant commissioner	Commander	Chief superintendent	Superintendent	Chief inspector	Inspector	Senior sergeant	Sergeant	Senior constable		Constable
Victoria Police; 2003–2010													
Victoria Police; 2003–2010	Chief commissioner	Deputy commissioner	Assistant commissioner	Commander	Chief superintendent	Superintendent	Chief inspector	Inspector	Senior sergeant	Sergeant	Senior constable	Reservist	Constable

=== Queensland ===
Name	Commissioner			Superintendent			Inspector			Sergeant				Constable		
Queensland Police Service; 1975–1978							No equivalent						No equivalent			
Queensland Police Service; 1975–1978	Commissioner	Deputy commissioner	Assistant commissioner	Chief superintendent	Superintendent		No equivalent	Inspector		Senior sergeant	Sergeant first class	Sergeant second class	No equivalent	Senior constable	Constable first class	Constable
Queensland Police Service; 1978–1991																
Queensland Police Service; 1978–1991	Commissioner	Deputy commissioner	Assistant commissioner	Superintendent first class	Superintendent second class	Superintendent third class	Inspector first class	Inspector second class	Inspector third class	Senior sergeant	Sergeant first class	Sergeant second class	Sergeant third class	Senior constable	Constable first class	Constable
Queensland Police Service; 1991–1997							No equivalent				No equivalent		No equivalent			
Queensland Police Service; 1991–1997	Commissioner	Deputy commissioner	Assistant commissioner	Chief superintendent	Superintendent		No equivalent	Inspector		Senior sergeant	No equivalent	Sergeant	No equivalent	Senior constable	Constable (18 months of service)	Constable
Queensland Police Service; 1997–2001							No equivalent						No equivalent			
Queensland Police Service; 1997–2001	Commissioner	Deputy commissioner	Assistant commissioner	Chief superintendent	Superintendent		No equivalent	Inspector		Senior sergeant	Sergeant first class	Sergeant second class	No equivalent	Senior constable		Constable
Queensland Police Service; 2002–2019							No equivalent				No equivalent		No equivalent			
Queensland Police Service; 2002–2019	Commissioner	Deputy commissioner	Assistant commissioner	Chief superintendent	Superintendent		No equivalent	Inspector		Senior sergeant	No equivalent	Sergeant	No equivalent	Senior constable	Constable (5 years)	Constable

=== Northern Territory ===
Name	Commissioner			Superintendent		Inspector		Sergeant			Constable			
Northern Territory Police; 1984				No equivalent										
Northern Territory Police; 1984	Commissioner	Deputy commissioner	Assistant commissioner	No equivalent	Superintendent	Chief inspector	Inspector	Sergeant first class	Sergeant second class	Sergeant third class	Senior constable	Constable first class	Constable	Recruit constable
Northern Territory Police; 1984–2012						No equivalent			No equivalent				No equivalent	
Northern Territory Police; 1984–2012	Commissioner	Deputy commissioner	Assistant commissioner	Commander	Superintendent	No equivalent		Senior sergeant	No equivalent	Sergeant	Senior constable	Constable first class	No equivalent	Recruit constable
Northern Territory Police; 2012–2019						No equivalent			No equivalent				No equivalent	
Northern Territory Police; 2012–2019	Commissioner	Deputy commissioner	Assistant commissioner	Commander	Superintendent	No equivalent		Senior sergeant	No equivalent	Sergeant	Senior constable	Constable first class	No equivalent	Recruit constable

=== Western Australia ===
1979–2006
Name	Officer Ranks								Non-Commissioned Officer Ranks			Other Ranks		
Western Australia Police Force	"crossed batons in a laurel wreath surmounted by a crown, silvered metal. Gorget made of offset silver bullion thread in an oak-leaf pattern with a silver bullion thread button on a royal blue velvet background"	"crossed batons in a laurel wreath surmounted by a star, silvered metal. Gorget is to be identical with the one worn by the Commissioner"	"crossed batons in a laurel wreath, silvered metal. Gorget is to be identical with the one worn by the Commissioner"	"3 small stars surmounted by a crown, silvered metal. Gorget is to be identical with the one worn by the Commissioner"	"2 stars surmounted by a crown, silvered metal. Gorget is to be identical with the one worn by the Commissioner"	"one star surmounted by a crown, silvered metal. Gorget made of silvered pressed metal in an oak-leaf pattern with a silvered metal button on a royal blue velvet background"	"one crown, silvered metal. Gorget made of chrome bar and button on a black velvet background"	"3 stars, silvered metal. Gorget is to be identical with the one worn by a Chief Inspector"	"3 broad chevrons with a crown"	"3 broad chevrons"	"2 broad chevrons separated by a narrow chevron"	"2 narrow chevrons"	"one narrow chevron"	no insignia
Western Australia Police Force	Commissioner	Deputy Commissioner	Assistant Commissioner	Commander	Chief Superintendent	Superintendent	Chief Inspector	Inspector	Senior Sergeant	Sergeant First Class	Sergeant	Senior Constable	Constable First Class	Constable

== See also ==
- Police rank
- Police ranks in Canada
- New Zealand Police ranks
- Police ranks of the United Kingdom
