= Chief constable =

Police officer rank in the United Kingdom

Chief constable is the rank used by the chief police officer of every territorial police force in the United Kingdom except for the City of London Police and the Metropolitan Police, as well as the chief officers of the three 'special' national police forces, the British Transport Police, Ministry of Defence Police, and Civil Nuclear Constabulary. The title is also held by the chief officers of the principal Crown Dependency police forces (the Isle of Man Constabulary, States of Guernsey Police Service, and States of Jersey Police) and the Sovereign Base Areas Police in Cyprus. The title was also held, ex officio, by the president of the Association of Chief Police Officers under the Police Reform Act 2002, until it was abolished in 2015. It was also the title of the chief officer of the Royal Parks Constabulary until this agency was disbanded in 2004.

Throughout the United Kingdom and Crown Dependencies there are currently fifty chief constables. These consist of the chief officers of 37 English territorial forces outside London, four Welsh territorial forces, the Police Service of Scotland, the Police Service of Northern Ireland, three special national forces and three Crown Dependency constabularies.

The chief officers of some police departments in Canada also hold the title of chief constable, for example the Surrey Police Service, the Vancouver Police Department or the New Westminster Police Department.

== History ==
The title is derived from the original local parish constables of the 18th century and earlier. Constable and constabulary were terms adopted in an attempt to provide a historical link with the older forces – the term is derived from the Latin comes stabuli (keeper of the stables) – and to emphasise local control. Much of the debate about policing in the early 19th century, when modern police forces were introduced in the United Kingdom, concerned fears that the new forces might become paramilitary agents of central government control. To this day other British police ranks, such as inspector and superintendent, are determinedly non-paramilitary – only police sergeants hold a quasi-military rank and even then the term sergeant had long existed as a non-military officer of subordinate rank.

The County Police Act 1839 gave the counties of England and Wales the opportunity to establish full-time police forces, headed by a chief constable who was appointed by the justices of the peace of the county. The first county to implement this was Wiltshire Constabulary, which appointed Captain Samuel Meredith RN its first chief constable on 28 November 1839. Other counties followed this pattern; for instance, Essex appointed its first chief constable on 11 February 1840.

Originally, most borough police forces were commanded by a head constable, although this rank was superseded by chief constable in most forces in the later 19th century and early 20th century and was almost completely abolished by the Police Act 1919. Liverpool City Police was the only large force to retain it until then.

The first woman to hold the rank of chief constable was Pauline Clare, appointed Chief Constable of the Lancashire Constabulary on 14 June 1995.

== Characteristics of office ==
Chief Constable

The population of areas for which chief constables are responsible varies from under a hundred thousand to two or three million, and it is commonplace for chief constables for larger force areas to be drawn from the chief constables of smaller forces. A chief constable has no senior officer. Prior to 2012, a chief constable was responsible to a police authority. In England and Wales, the chief constable is now appointed by and accountable to the Police and Crime Commissioner of their service, or to an elected mayor, who may also dismiss the chief constable.

The chief constable's badge of rank, worn on the epaulettes, consists of crossed tipstaffs in a laurel wreath, surmounted by a crown. This is similar to the insignia of a lieutenant-general in the British Army, and is also worn by an assistant commissioner in the Metropolitan Police.

The chief constable is assisted by a deputy chief constable (DCC) and one or more assistant chief constables (ACC). The chief constable, DCC and ACCs are collectively known as the "chief officers" of a force.

A chief constable is a corporation sole and acts as the legal entity for an entire police force. They are responsible for fulfilling all statutory and legal obligations of the office of chief constable and complying with any schemes of governance or consent that exist, which determine force governance arrangements.

== Salaries ==
The salaries of chief constables vary from force to force, primarily on the basis of the population of their force's territory, but the amounts are fixed centrally. As of 2022, the highest paid is the chief constable of the Police Service of Northern Ireland, on £230,000, in recognition of the unique security challenges and political sensitivity of that office. The Commissioner of the Metropolitan Police and their deputy are paid significantly more than any chief constable, partly because the Metropolitan Police has national anti-terrorism and security duties that overlap with other local forces, but also because the Metropolitan Police is by far the largest force in the country. As of 2011, the commissioner earns an annual salary of £260,088, whilst their deputy earns £214,722.

== Metropolitan Police and City of London Police ==
In London, the Metropolitan Police and the City of London Police are led by commissioners rather than chief constables. Chief constable was, however, a lower rank in the Metropolitan Police which existed between 1886 and 1946.

In 1869, the divisions of the Metropolitan Police were grouped into four districts, and four new officers called district superintendents were appointed to command them, ranking between the divisional superintendents and the two assistant commissioners. These officers were to be generally military officers, civil servants or lawyers who were directly appointed to the rank. This caused a certain amount of concern, since some saw it as the creation of an "officer class" for the police, which had always been resisted. Their rank badge consisted of crossed tipstaves in a wreath.

In 1886, the rank of district superintendent was renamed chief constable, as it was decided that it could be confused with the divisional superintendents. Unlike their superiors, chief constables were actually sworn into the office of constable, hence the name. A fifth chief constable was later created in the Criminal Investigation Department. In 1919 the rank became junior to the new rank of deputy assistant commissioners, who took over the districts in 1933, with the chief constables remaining as their deputies until the latter rank was finally renamed deputy commander in 1946.

== See also ==
- Police ranks of the United Kingdom
- Law enforcement in Canada
