= Cobourg Police Service =

Municipal police service in Ontario, Canada

Cobourg Police Service Service de police de Cobourg
- Motto: Lex Praesidium Libertatis (The Law of the Protection of Liberty)

Agency overview
- Formed: 1837
- Employees: 118 (41 police officers)
- Volunteers: 11 (2021)
- Annual budget: $6,473,290 (2021)

Jurisdictional structure
- Operations jurisdiction: Cobourg, Ontario, Canada
- Area: 22.41 sq km
- Population: 20 519
- Governing body: Cobourg Police Services Board
- Constituting instrument: Police Services Act (RSO 1990 c. P.15)
- General nature: Local civilian police

Operational structure
- Headquarters: 107 King Street West, Cobourg, Ontario 43.95906277747511°N 78.17011634622143°W
- Sworn members: 41
- Non-sworn members: 67
- Elected officer responsible: Michael Kerzner, Solicitor General of Ontario
- Agency executives: Paul VandeGraaf, chief of police; Jeffrey Haskins, deputy chief of police

Notables
- Programme: V13 Policetech Accelerator

Website
- www.cobourgpoliceservice.com

The Cobourg Police Service (CPS; French: Service de police de Cobourg) is a municipal police force in Cobourg, Ontario, Canada. As of 2021, the service employed 35 police officers, 28 special constables, and 11 auxiliary constables. The force is notable for its tiered police service delivery model, which it adopted in 2018, and the V13 Policetech Accelerator, which it operates alongside the Northumberland Community Futures Development Corporation. The Accelerator facilitates research and development partnerships between small or starting businesses and the CPS.

The service is the largest provider of third-party criminal records checks in Canada. Revenue generated from the checks funds the force's Corporate Services division, which performs the records checks; capital investments in the police service; and local social services.

== History ==
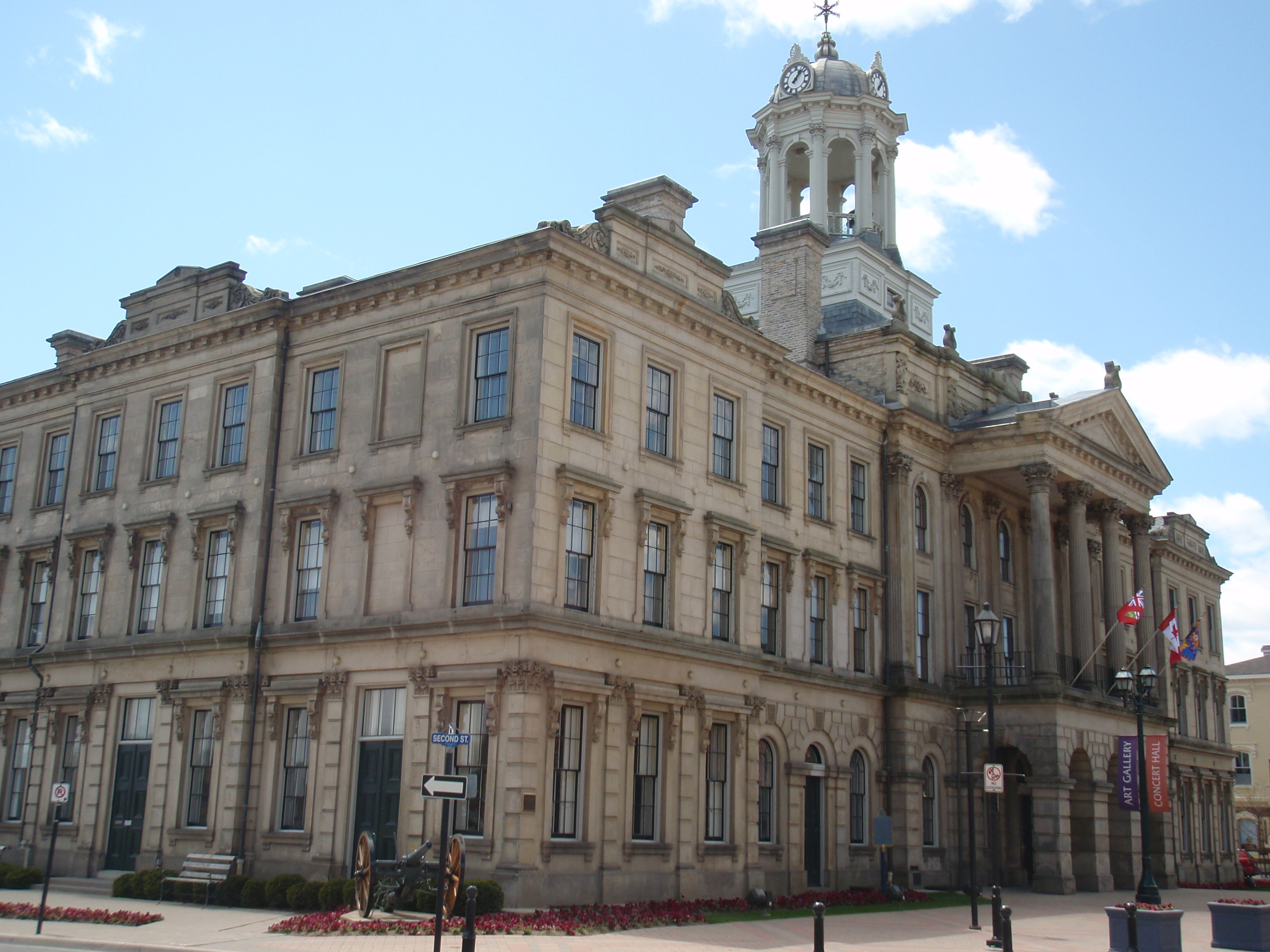
Victoria Hall in downtown Cobourg, out of which the Cobourg Police Service operated between 1898 and 1971. The Hall is also home to the Town of Cobourg, Northumberland County Art Gallery, and the Cobourg Concert Hall.

The Town of Cobourg was incorporated out of Hamilton Township in 1837, and a single-officer police force operating out of Victoria Hall had been established by 1898.

In 1915, Constable William Rourke suffered a fatal heart attack during a violent arrest. He had been employed by the force for 22 years.

In 1970, the Canadian Armed Forces determined that the Cobourg Armoury building — a two-storey brick structure that had been built in 1904 a few blocks west of Victoria Hall — was surplus, and turned the structure over to the Town of Cobourg. The building was subsequently turned over to the police force in 1971.

In the early 2000s, various politicians, the Cobourg and Port Hope Police Associations, and the Cobourg Police Services Board advocated for or endorsed studies of the amalgamation of the Cobourg Police Service and neighbouring Port Hope Police Service. In 2003, the Cobourg Police Services Board hired Garry Clement, a former RCMP officer, as the Cobourg Police Service's new chief of police, with a mandate to amalgamate the two police forces into one service covering all of West Northumberland, including the Town of Cobourg, Municipality of Port Hope, and Township of Hamilton. Port Hope ultimately elected to maintain its independent police service, and as of 2022, both municipalities continue to maintain individual police forces.

In 2004, 18-year old Troy Davey called Cobourg Police claiming to have been the victim of a robbery. While being interviewed by Constable Chris Garrett, Davey pulled out a knife and fatally wounded the lone officer, who managed to shoot Davey in the leg before collapsing. Davey was arrested at the Northumberland Hills Hospital shortly thereafter, where he had sought medical attention for his gunshot wound. It was later determined that Davey had made a hoax call with the intent of ambushing responding police officers with a knife and bomb, and he was found guilty of first-degree murder in 2007.

In 2018, the Service, Northumberland County OPP, and Northumberland Hills Hospital (NHH) established a shared mental health crisis response team which partnered specially-trained OPP and CPS officers with NHH nurses, operating 5 days a week.

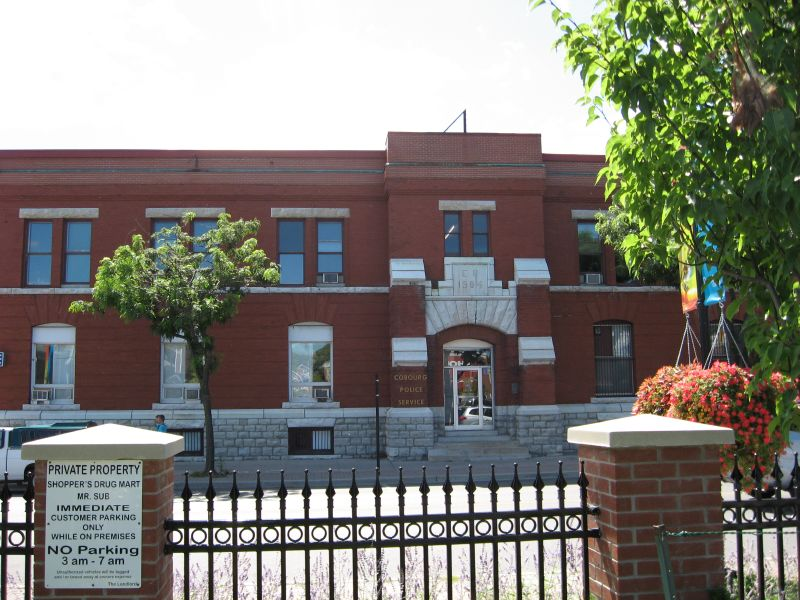
The current Cobourg Police Service headquarters.

During the summer of 2022, the Cobourg Police Service provided parking enforcement under contract to neighbouring Hamilton Township. The service was provided by the force's special constables, and was repeated over the summer of 2023.

=== Police chiefs ===
Chief	Tenure
Edwin Cooney	1860-1872
William Rankin	1872-1898
John C Ruse	1898-1936
William J Carey	1936-1950
Harold Pearce	1950-1970
Eugene Butler	1970-1982
Daniel K McDougal	1982-1996
John Kay	1996-2002
Kyle Foster (Acting)	2002-2003
Gerry W Clement	2003-2007
Paul Sweet	2007-2012
Kai Liu	2012-2019
Paul VandeGraff	2019–Present

== Organization ==
=== Police services board ===
Like all municipalities in Ontario, the Town of Cobourg maintains a police services board, responsible for overseeing the police service. The board approves the police budget, hires the chief and deputy chiefs of police directly, and is the legal employer of every Cobourg Police employee. Although the board sets overall service policy and direction, it has no operational control over the service or its officers, and day-to-day policing decisions are the exclusive jurisdiction of the police chief.

The board is composed of five members: the mayor (or their designate); one town councillor; one member of the public appointed by town council; and two members of the public appointed by the province. As of 2023, it consists of:

Name	Position	Appointed by
Ronald Kerr	Chair	Province
Dean Pepper	Vice-chair	Cobourg Town Council
Nicole Beatty	Deputy Mayor	ex officio
Sean Graham	Member	Province
Adam Bureau	Councillor	Cobourg Town Council

=== Ranks ===
==== Sworn officers ====
Rank	Commanding officers		Senior officers			Police officers
Rank	Chief of police	Deputy chief of police	Inspector	Staff sergeant	Sergeant	Constable
Insignia						
Insignia (shoulder board)				Shoulder boards are not used for these ranks.		
Uniform	Navy blue or white dress shirt, black tie, black trouser piping, a decorative chest badge, and a peaked cap.	Navy blue or white dress shirt, black tie, black trouser piping, a decorative chest badge, and a peaked cap.	Navy blue or white dress shirt, black tie, black trouser piping, and a peaked cap.	Navy blue or white dress shirt, black tie, black trouser piping, and a peaked cap.	Navy blue dress shirt, red trouser piping, and a peaked cap or ballcap.	Navy blue dress shirt, red trouser piping, and a peaked cap or ballcap.

==== Investigative staff ====
Investigative staff fall into two categories, sworn and non-sworn. Sworn investigators hold the ranks of Detective Constable or Detective Sergeant, ranks that are equivalent to Sergeant or Staff Sergeant, respectively. Non-sworn investigators are special constables employed for crime-scene processing and forensic identification services, and are referred to either as scene-of-crime officers (SOCO) or forensic identification specialists.

==== Special constables ====
Cobourg Police special constables are divided into two ranks, special constable and special constable supervisor, and wear baby blue dress shirts, navy blue trousers with no trouser piping, and peaked caps with red bands or ballcaps. Rank slides are identical to those of sworn constables, but are marked with "Special Constable" or "Special Constable Supervisor" lettering above the Canadian flag.

==== Auxiliary constables ====
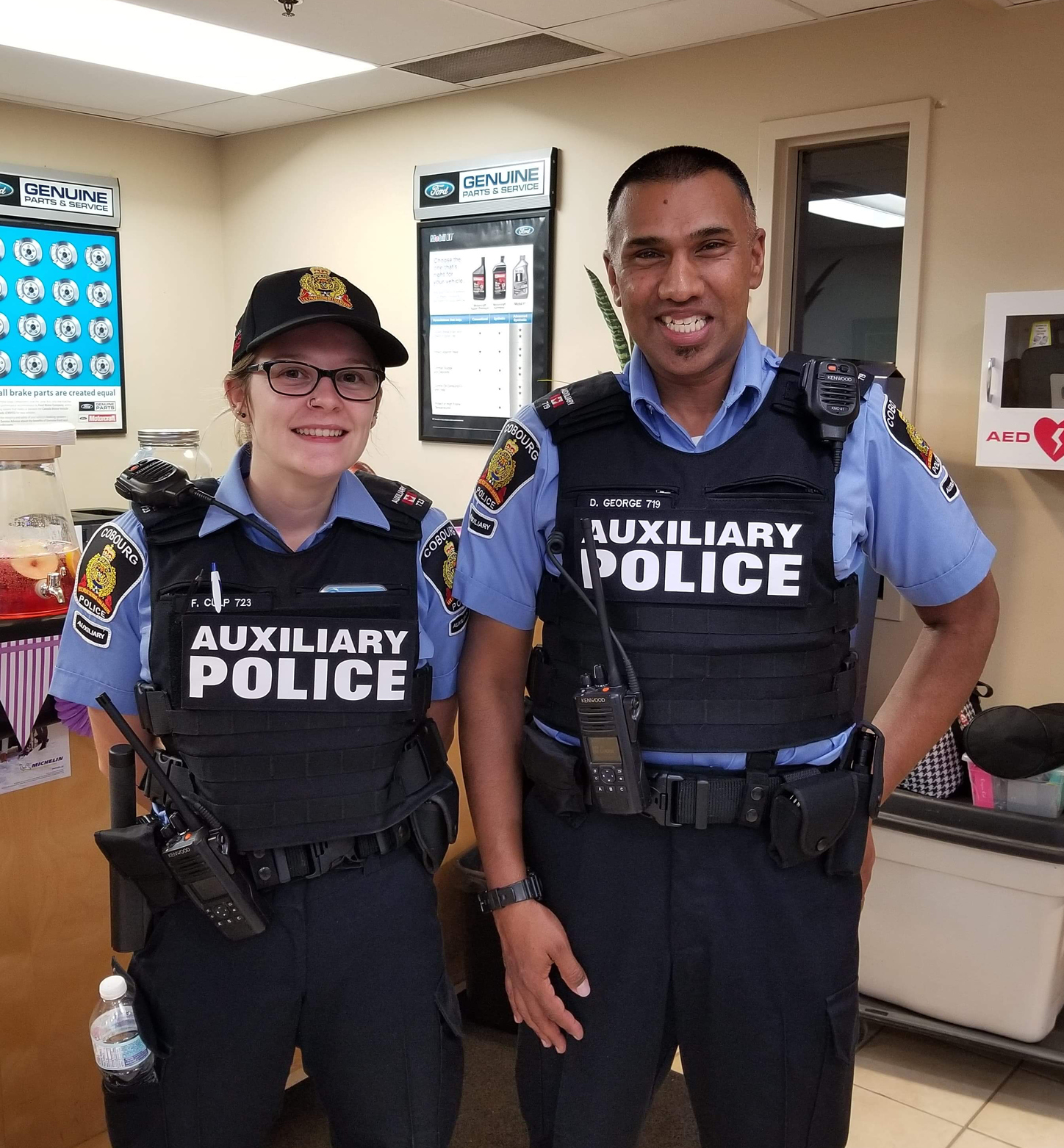
Two members of the Cobourg Police Auxiliary pose in the Armouries Building.

Auxiliary constables are supervised by sworn police managers, and do not have an internal rank structure. Auxiliary constables wear baby blue dress shirts, navy blue trousers with no trouser piping, and peaked caps with checkered red bands or ballcaps. Rank slides are identical to those of sworn constables, but are marked with "Auxiliary" lettering above the Canadian flag.

=== Specialized units ===
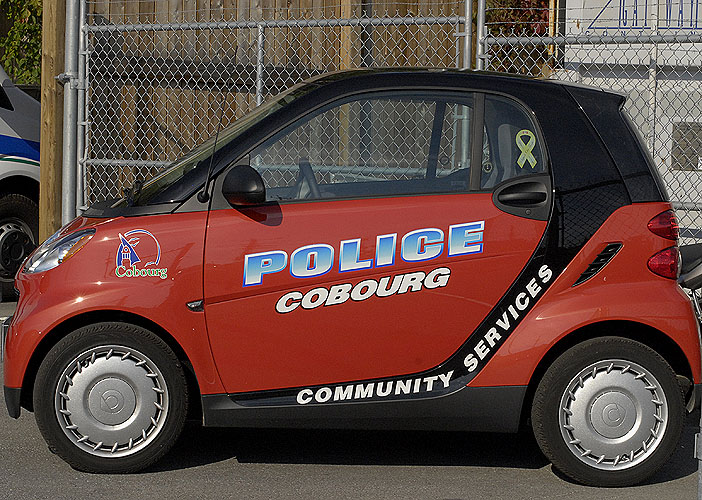
A Smart Car assigned to the Community Services unit.

Criminal Investigation Bureau (CIB)

Forensic Identification Services (FIS)

Human Trafficking Unit

Drugs and Intelligence

Major Cases

Bail/Court Compliance

Mental Health Response

Court Services

== Equipment ==
=== Weapons ===
- Glock 22: Large frame .40 S&W
- SIG Sauer P226
- Pepper spray (OC spray): Regular uniformed officers
- Diemaco C8 carbine
