= Station sergeant =

British and Commonwealth police rank

Station sergeant (also known as crown sergeant, senior sergeant or staff sergeant) is a police rank senior to sergeant and junior to inspector in some British and Commonwealth police forces. The rank insignia is usually a sergeant's three chevrons surmounted by a crown, or sometimes four chevrons. The Metropolitan Police (of London), which was the first force to introduce the rank, originally used four chevrons, but later changed to a crown over three chevrons, which was identical to the insignia worn by a staff sergeant in the British Army. A police officer holding the rank is usually the senior sergeant in a police station, or in some cases the commander of a smaller sub-divisional police establishment.

The rank is used in the Hong Kong Police Force (station sergeant), the Barbados Police Service (station sergeant), the Port of Felixstowe Police (station sergeant), the Royal Gibraltar Police (crown sergeant) and most Canadian police forces (staff sergeant). It was historically used in the London Metropolitan Police (station sergeant) and the Royal Parks Constabulary (crown sergeant). The rank is also used, though with a different operational role, in the Australian Federal Police.

== Australia ==
Although only used in special circumstances, the Australian Federal Police uniquely has separate ranks of both senior sergeant and staff sergeant. Whilst on deployment in peacekeeping operations with the International Deployment Group members of the AFP are appointed to the ranks of senior sergeant (three chevrons below a crown which is surrounded by a laurel leaf), station sergeant (a crown surrounded by a laurel leaf), superintendent (a pip and a crown), or commander (three pips and crown).

== Hong Kong ==
In the Hong Kong Police Force, the rank of station sergeant (SSGT) is senior to sergeant but junior to probationary inspector. A station sergeant is required to have served three years at the rank of sergeant and be recommended by a selection board before being promoted to the rank. Station sergeant is the highest non-commissioned rank in the Hong Kong Police Force. Because of this, station sergeants tend to be the most experienced NCO in a unit, serving as the commander or second-in-command of a unit and/or a station when necessary.

To progress to the rank of probationary inspector, a station sergeant must undergo the same application process as other junior officers. The rank badge of a station sergeant is the Hong Kong Police badge surrounded by a wreath worn in the centre of the shoulder strap. However, station sergeants go through a 13-week training process instead of the 36-week training that other officers do.

A distinctive feature of the uniform of a station sergeant is that they wear the white shirt typically worn by commissioned officers as opposed to the cornflower blue or dodger blue shirts worn by sergeants and all ranks below. However, acting station sergeants may wear the blue shirts with station sergeant insignia.

== Ireland ==
The Irish Garda Síochána used the rank until at least the 1960s.

== United Kingdom ==
=== Metropolitan Police ===
In the Metropolitan Police, the station sergeant, or station police sergeant (SPS), was the senior sergeant in a police station. Station sergeants either acted as a station inspector's deputy or commanded smaller police stations that had no inspectors. When introduced, the rank insignia consisted of four chevrons. From 1921, this arrangement was replaced by a crown over three chevrons - the same insignia as a staff sergeant in the British Army.

The rank of station sergeant was officially introduced to uniform grades in 1871. In 1890, a station sergeant's pay started at 45 shillings a week (a sergeant's maximum pay was 40 shillings a week), rising by an annual increment of 1 shilling a week to 48 shillings a week.

The Criminal Investigation Department equivalent was the first class detective sergeant, who was in charge of the allocation of cases to the detectives in each division.

Originally, station sergeant was a mandatory step between sergeant and inspector, but later it became common to miss out the rank entirely and it became more of a reward for long-serving sergeants who did not wish to be promoted to inspector. The rank was never available to women officers.

No further promotions to the ranks of station sergeant and first-class detective sergeant were made after 1973. The last officer to hold the rank was Station Sergeant William Palmer, who retired in 1980. The last officer to be promoted to the rank was Station Sergeant Kenneth Humm, who retired in 1983 following promotion to inspector in 1980. However, the term continued to be used to denote the longest-serving sergeant in a station, although it was no longer a separate rank with its own insignia.

Possibly the most famous fictional station sergeant was George Dixon in the long-running television series Dixon of Dock Green.

An equivalent rank was clerk sergeant, or clerk police sergeant (CPS), held by the officer responsible for all administration in a division. Clerk sergeants were regraded as inspectors in January 1954.

=== City of London Police ===
The insignia commonly associated with the rank of station sergeant is still used within the City of London Police for those officers in an acting inspector role.

=== Port of Felixstowe Police ===
The Port of Felixstowe Police, a small British specialised police force responsible for policing the Port of Felixstowe, had one officer of the rank of station sergeant until 2015, and held the distinction of being the final British police force to employ this historic rank. In 2015, on the retirement of Inspector M. Hayward, the last station sergeant, Station Sergeant A. Miaoulis, was promoted to inspector, and the rank of station sergeant was abolished.

=== Royal Gibraltar Police ===
The Royal Gibraltar Police, the principal law enforcement agency in the overseas territory of Gibraltar has the concept of crown sergeants in their force. However, unlike other police forces with similar concepts, crown sergeant in the Royal Gibraltar Police is an appointment (role) not a rank. It is an appointment given to the response team leaders of the operational division to symbolise their seniority. The appointment was initially introduced in 2018 with the name of senior sergeant, which was later at some point changed to the present name of crown sergeant. Crown sergeants wear the insignia of a sergeant with a crown on the chevrons' top, the same insignia station sergeants and crown sergeants wear in other police forces.

=== Royal Parks Constabulary ===
The Royal Parks Constabulary used the station sergeant rank (known as crown sergeant) until 1989, when the last incumbent, Sergeant Robert Parker was appointed to the rank. The Constabulary was disbanded in May 2006 with its functions transferred to the Royal Parks Operational Command Unit in the Metropolitan Police.
