= Parks Regulation Act 1872 =

Act of the Parliament of the United Kingdom

Parks Regulation Act 1872 (Note: Section 1.)
- Act of Parliament
- Parliament of the United Kingdom
- Long title: An Act for the Regulation of the Royal Parks and Gardens.
- Citation: 35 & 36 Vict. c. 15
- Territorial extent: United Kingdom

Dates
- Royal assent: 27 June 1872
- Commencement: 27 June 1872 (Note: The Acts of Parliament (Commencement) Act 1793.)
Other legislation
Amended by	Parks Regulation (Amendment) Act 1926; Minister of Works Act 1942; Criminal Justice Act 1948; Parks Regulation (Amendment) Act 1974; Criminal Procedure (Scotland) Act 1975; Criminal Law Act 1977; Criminal Justice Act 1982; Police and Criminal Evidence Act 1984; Statute Law (Repeals) Act 1993; Police Act 1996
Relates to	Serious Organised Crime and Police Act 2005

Status: Amended

Text of statute as originally enacted

Revised text of statute as amended

Text of the Parks Regulation Act 1872 as in force today (including any amendments) within the United Kingdom, from legislation.gov.uk.

Parks Regulation (Amendment) Act 1974 (Note: Section 1(1).)
- Act of Parliament
- Parliament of the United Kingdom
- Long title: An Act to amend further the Parks Regulation Act 1872.
- Citation: 1974 c. 29
- Territorial extent: United Kingdom

Dates
- Royal assent: 17 July 1974
- Commencement: 17 July 1974
Other legislation
Amends	Parks Regulation Act 1872

Status: Current legislation

Text of statute as originally enacted

Revised text of statute as amended

Text of the Parks Regulation (Amendment) Act 1974 as in force today (including any amendments) within the United Kingdom, from legislation.gov.uk.

The Parks Regulation Act 1872 (35 & 36 Vict. c. 15) is an act of the Parliament of the United Kingdom, covering policing and regulation of seventeen royal parks, consisting of fifteen in London and two in Scotland. It now has no outstanding effects.

Section 2, 4 and 9 of, and schedule 1 to, the act were repealed by the Parks Regulation (Amendment) Act 1926 (16 & 17 Geo. 5. c. 36). It was modified by the Parks Regulation (Amendment) Act 1974 (c. 29), requiring park keepers to be attested before acting as constables and renaming most of them collectively as the Royal Parks Constabulary, though the Kew Constabulary remained independent. Sections 161-162 of the Serious Organised Crime and Police Act 2005 abolished the Royal Parks Constabulary, placed the London parks under section 2 of the 1926 act and effectively removed any powers the Kew Constabulary had in other Royal Parks.

== Schedules and sections ==
Its "First Schedule" listed offences within the Royal Parks for which people could be arrested by the park keepers and fined a maximum of £5 (section 4), with the offence of giving a false address to the keeper set at the same rate by section 5 and that of assaulting a park keeper at £20 or a maximum of six (England) or three (Scotland) months' imprisonment with or without hard labour by sections 6 and 15. Any new rule under that schedule had to be placed before both Houses of Parliament and removed if they disapproved it within a month (section 9). Regulations "to be observed in pursuance of this Act" were to be publicly displayed in the parks (section 10). The Act was not to affect, prejudice or derogate rights of way (Section 11), any previous acts (section 12), any Crown rights (Section 13) or the Metropolitan Streets Act 1867 (Section 14).

Drawing on the common law concept of the hue and cry, section 5 granted a park keeper and "any persons whom he may call to his assistance" the right to arrest people for the offences in schedule 1 and sections 5, 6 and 15. Section 7 gave park keepers all the "powers, privileges, ... immunities... duties and responsibilities" as police constables in the district in which their Park fell (mostly the Metropolitan Police District), and section 8 granted all the same "powers, privileges, and immunities" to police constables of the relevant district within the bounds of the Parks.

== Parks listed in "Second Schedule" ==
=== London ===
- Hyde Park
- St James's Park
- Green Park
- Kensington Gardens
- Parliament Square Gardens
- Regent's Park
- Kennington Park
- Primrose Hill
- Victoria Park
- Battersea Park
- Greenwich Park
- Kew Gardens, Pleasure Grounds and Green
- Hampton Court Park, Hampton Court Gardens and Green
- Richmond Park and Green
- Bushy Park

=== Scotland ===
- Holyrood Park
- Linlithgow Peel and Park
