= Royal Parks Half Marathon =

Half-marathon in London, England

Coordinates: 51°30′9.3″N 0°9′57.12″W

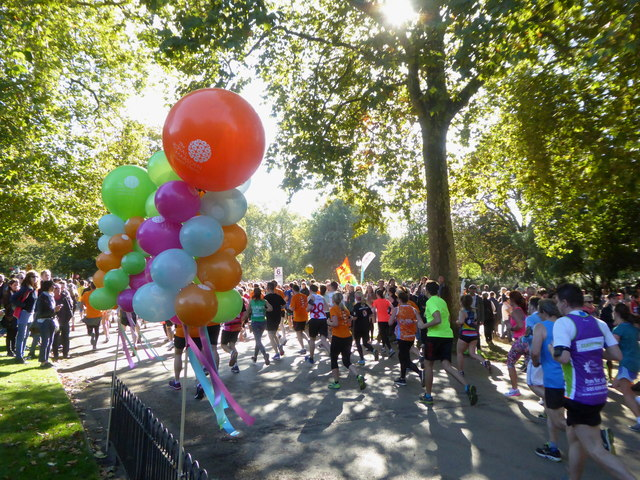
- The 2016 half marathon
- Date: 2008 - present
- Location: London, United Kingdom
- Event type: Road
- Distance: Half Marathon
- Established: 2008
- Website: royalparkshalf.com

The Royal Parks Half Marathon, first held in 2008, takes place each October, starting and finishing in Hyde Park. It is the only half marathon that travels through central London and four of the Royal Parks and is one of London's largest half marathons, with over 16,000 participants.

The 2025 Royal Parks Half Marathon is scheduled to take place on Sunday 12 October 2025.

== History ==
The Royal Parks Half Marathon was established in 2008 by the Royal Parks Foundation as an annual fundraising initiative to both raise funds to support the Foundations work in maintaining London's eight Royal Parks and enabling charities to be involved as well. Since its inception, the event has raised over £70 million for more than 1,200 UK charities.

During the event on 10 October 2021, participant Marcus Fisher, a Landscape Architect, aged 30, died during the race. Mr Fisher was fundraising for Prostate Cancer UK and collapsed in the final leg. The cause of his death remains unknown to the public. Fundraising continued in his honour and has reached £13,000 as of May 2022.

The winner of the 2021 event, Oscar Bell, won with it being only the first half marathon of his career. An experienced runner from Ware, Hertfordshire, Bell surprised fellow runners and audiences with his almost three-minute lead over second place at the finish line.

== Route ==
The 13.1 mile route starts and finishes in Hyde Park, travelling through and past many of central London's famous landmarks on closed roads. These landmarks include Trafalgar Square, the London Eye, Canada House, and Buckingham Palace. The route also passes through four of the eight Royal Parks in London, namely Hyde Park, The Green Park, St. James's Park and Kensington Gardens.

== Entry and fundraising ==
Entry to the race is secured via a two-draw ballot, which is free to enter via the official race website. The ballot generally opens for entries at the end of January, with the draw taking place at the start of February, and the race always taking place in October.

The race entry fee, as of May 2022, is £59 with an administrative charge of £3.95.

To enter the race, each participant must run on behalf of a charity, either of their choice, or the default option of the Royal Parks Foundation. Each charity has their own accepted minimum fundraising amount, which entrants must raise in order to secure an entry. Entrants must be 17 years old or older to enter.

Since the first race in 2008, the Royal Parks Half Marathon has raised over £55 million, supporting over 1,000 UK charities, including GOSH and Mind.

== COVID-19 postponement ==
The 2020 Royal Parks Half Marathon was scheduled to take place on Sunday 11 October 2020, however, due to the COVID-19 pandemic and UK lockdown restrictions, the event was rescheduled by the organisers to take place on Sunday 11 April 2021.

The rescheduled 2020 event, due to further COVID-19 restrictions, was entirely changed to a digital-only running event by organisers. The digital race was completed whilst using a custom-built mobile application, specifically for registered runners of the event. The app allowed for a digital leaderboard, an integrated race day atmosphere using audio cues and augmented reality, as well as the ability to submit completed times.

On race day, the app gave an online warm-up and the digital race began at 9am on 11 April 2021, with runners completing the distance in their local areas, thus adhering to COVID-19 restrictions. Once runners had completed their race, they uploaded their completion time via the app.

The organisers confirmed that the event would return to in-person running with the 2021 event taking place on Sunday 10 October 2021. The route for the 2021 event was changed for the first time since 2015, with the Hyde Park starting point being replaced by the east end of The Mall. Organisers confirmed that the race would return to the original route from 2022 onwards.

== Winners ==
=== Men ===
- 2008 John Muriithi - 1:10:19
- 2009 Paolo Sandali - 1:09:31
- 2010 Edwin Kipkorir - 1:05:40
- 2011 Abdul Farah - 1:08:39
- 2012 Martyn Bean - 1:12:32
- 2013 Ryan Mckinley - 1:09:07
- 2014 Carlos Fernando García Mañas - 1:12:05
- 2015 Russ Best - 1:09:37
- 2016 Russ Best - 1:09:37
- 2017 James Hoad - 1:08:51
- 2018 Samatar Farah - 1:10:52
- 2019 James Hoad - 1:06:48
- 2020 Neil Mcclements - 1:13:12
- 2021 Oscar Bell - 1:09:14
- 2022 Oscar Bell - 1:07:14
- 2023 Gokce Altintig 1:06:21
- 2024 Oscar Bell - 1:05:12

=== Women ===
- 2008 Natalie Gray - 1:24:19
- 2009 Natalie Gray - 1:17:39
- 2010 Miriam Makewa - 1:14:01
- 2011 Tish Jones - 1:22:09
- 2012 Carey Lynn - 1:25:09
- 2013 Jessica Henderson - 1:22:27
- 2014 Amy Clements - 1:17:02
- 2015 Gaby Van Clarke - 1:21:53
- 2016 Rose Harvey - 1:21:20
- 2017 Stephanie Davis - 1:17:25
- 2018 Katie Murray - 1:23:18
- 2019 Georgie Fenn - 1:22:09
- 2020 Sarah King - 1:13:57
- 2021 Rachel Morison - 1:32:08
- 2022 Lauren Church - 1:19:52
- 2023 Libby Gandhi 1:18:14
- 2024 Nicola Jackson - 1:18:15

=== Non-Binary ===
- 2024 Gokce Altintig 1:21:00

Results taken from Royal Parks Half Marathon website. and sporthive.com

== Awards ==
- 2019 - The Running Award - Bronze for Best Half Marathon over 5,000 Participants
- 2018 - UK Sponsorship Awards - Most Effective Use Of Mass Participation Sponsorship
- 2017 - Runner's World Personal Best Awards - Best New Race of the Decade
- 2016 – BT Sport Industry Awards and Running Awards - Shortlisted
- 2013 – Third Sector Excellence Awards – Best Fundraising Event
- 2011 – Event Awards – Best Outdoor Event
- 2009 – Hollis Sponsorship Awards – Sponsorship Award (Charity & Community)
- 2008 – Runner’s World Awards – Best New Event
