= Constable =

Person holding a particular office

A constable is a person holding a particular office, most commonly in law enforcement. The office of constable can vary significantly in different jurisdictions. Constable is commonly the rank of an officer within a police service. Other people may be granted powers of a constable without holding this title.

== Etymology ==
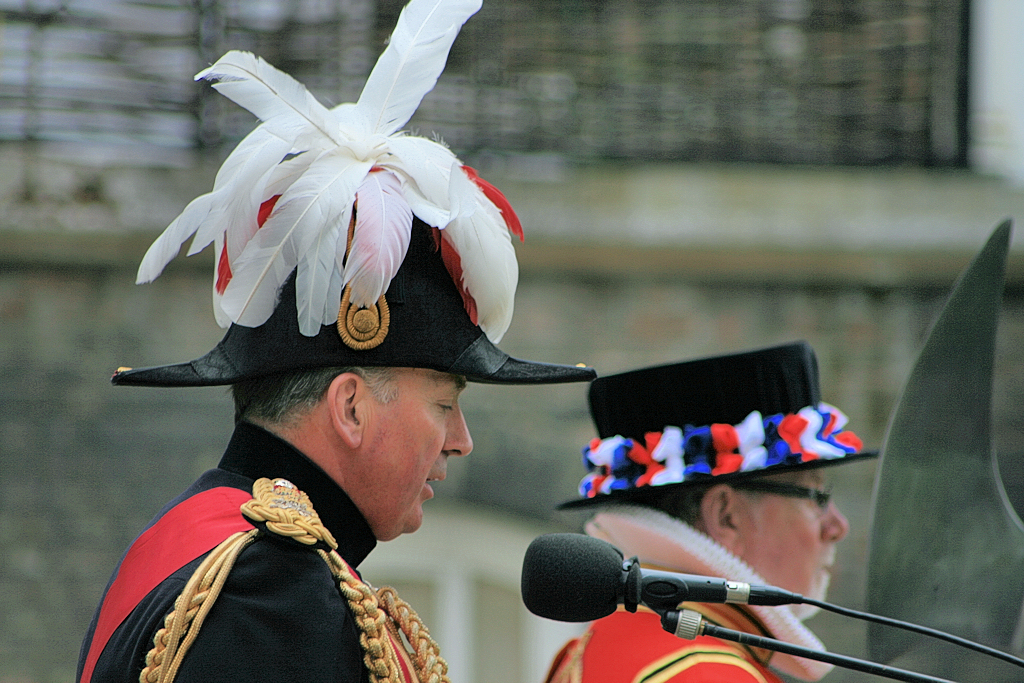
General Sir Richard Dannatt, dressed in the formal attire of the Constable of the Tower, speaking at the Ceremony of the Constable's Dues, June 2010

Etymologically, the word constable is a loan from Old French conestable (Modern French connétable), itself from Late Latin comes stabuli (attendant to the stables, literally 'count of the stable'), and originated from the Roman Empire; originally, the constable was the officer responsible for keeping the horses of a lord or monarch.

The title was imported to the monarchies of medieval Europe, and in many countries developed into a high military rank and great officer of state (e.g. the Constable of France, in French Connétable de France, who was the commander-in-chief of all royal armed forces (second to the king) until Prime Minister Cardinal Richelieu abolished the charge in 1627).

Most constables in modern jurisdictions are law enforcement officers. In the United Kingdom, the Commonwealth of Nations and some Continental European countries, a constable is the lowest rank of police officer (it is also, when preceded by the term sworn, used to describe any police officer with arrest and other powers), while in the United States a constable is generally an elected peace officer with lesser jurisdiction than a sheriff; however, in the Channel Islands a constable is an elected office-holder at the parish level.

Historically, a constable could also refer to a castellan, the officer charged with the defence of a castle. Even today, there is a Constable of the Tower of London.

An equivalent position is that of marshal, which is from Old French mareschal (Modern French maréchal), itself from Old Frankish *marskalk, attested by Medieval Latin mariscalcus from a Proto-Germanic *maraχskalkaz (cf. Old High German marahschalh), a compound of *maraz "horse" (cf. English mare) and *skalkaz "servant" (cf. Old English sċealc "servant, retainer, member of a crew") and originally meant "stable keeper, horse tender, groom".

== Usage by country and region ==
=== Australia ===
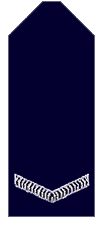
Rank epaulette of a constable of the New South Wales Police Force

In Australia, as in the United Kingdom, constable is the lowest rank in most police services. It is often categorised into the following (from lowest to highest): probationary constable; constable; constable first class; senior constable; leading senior constable. These variations depend on the individual state or territory police force in question.

Senior constable generally refers to a police officer of the rank above constable, and is denoted by way of two chevrons or stripes.

The New South Wales Police Force has three grades of senior constable, namely senior constable (two chevrons), incremental senior constable (two chevrons and a horizontal bar), and leading senior constable (two chevrons and two horizontal bars). A senior constable is senior to a constable but junior to an incremental senior constable. Promotion to senior constable can occur after a minimum of five years' service (one year as a probationary constable in addition to four years as constable) and then upon passing probity checks and an exam. Incremental senior constable is attained after ten years of service automatically. One is appointed to the rank of leading senior constable on a qualification basis, but must have a minimum of seven years' service amongst other criteria in order to be eligible. Leading senior constable is a specialist position of which there are limited allocated numbers within any section/unit or local area command. If an officer is transferred to another duty type or station, the officer is then relieved of the position of leading senior constable: it is primarily a position for field training officers who oversee the training and development of inexperienced probationary constables or constables.

Within the Victoria Police, senior constable is the rank above constable, while above senior constable is leading senior constable. When first introduced into the Victoria Police, leading senior constable was a classification not a rank, somewhat like "detective"; leading senior constables were appointed specifically to assist in the training and mentoring of more junior members. The last round of wage negotiations, however, saw leading senior constable become a rank in its own right, one that a lot of members pass through on their way from constable to sergeant, though this is not strictly necessary and it is permissible to be promoted to sergeant direct from senior constable. The general form of address for both senior constable and leading senior constable is "senior", and this is acceptable even in courts.

The Queensland Police Service employs a similar rank structure. Recently graduated recruits from the QPS police academy are deemed First Year Constables, a rank they will hold for the duration of their probationary period within the service. Following their year of probation, they are promoted to the rank of constable, followed by another two grades, including the rank of senior constable (two chevrons) and leading senior constable (LSC, two chevrons and a bar). If the officer proves successful in an application for a detective position, they are to be known as a 'detective' constable. The proceeding ranks follow suit, including detective senior constable, detective LSC, detective sergeant, and so on.

=== Canada ===
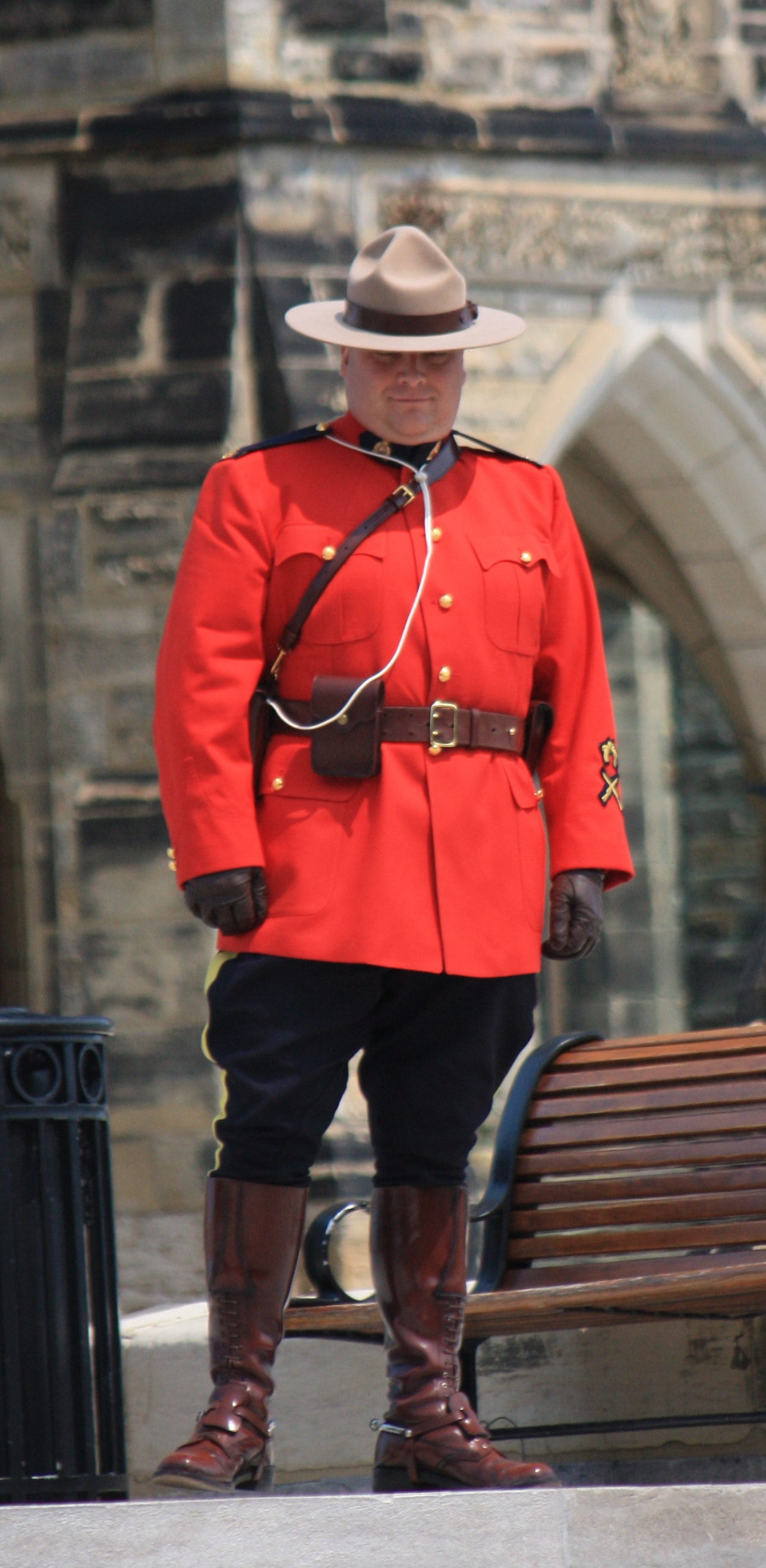
A constable of the Royal Canadian Mounted Police in full dress. Constables are typically the lowest rank in Canadian police services.

In Canada, as in the United Kingdom, constable is the lowest rank in most law enforcement services, including the Royal Canadian Mounted Police. In Newfoundland the provincial police are the Royal Newfoundland Constabulary, whereby all officers are addressed by the term "constable".

In addition, the chief officers of some municipal police services in Canada, notably Vancouver Police Department, carry the title of chief constable.

In Canadian French, constable is translated to agent, except in the Royal Canadian Mounted Police where it is translated as gendarme.

Appointments can further be separated into:

- Special constables
  - RCMP special constables are appointed for specific skills, for example aboriginal language skills. They are peace officers under the Royal Canadian Mounted Police Act.
  - Outside of the RCMP, special constables are not police officers but are appointed to serve certain law enforcement functions, for example SPCA agents or court/jail officers.
- Auxiliary constables, or reserve constables, are volunteers with a policing agency. They generally have peace officer status only when engaged in specific authorized tasks.
- Provincial civil constables (in Nova Scotia) deal with matters of a civil nature.

=== Denmark ===
Within the Danish Defence, constables are the lowest rank group. The ranks of Konstabel, Overkonstabel and Overkonstabel af 1. grad are used for professional enlisted soldiers, sailors and airmen. However, Overkonstabel af 1. grad is only used within the army, as both the navy and air force use a specialist rank instead.

NATO Code	OR-3	OR-2	OR-1
Royal Danish Army
Danish	Overkonstabel af 1. grad	Overkonstabel	Konstabel	Konstabelelev
Literal translation	Senior constable first class	Senior constable	Constable	Constable trainee
Official translation	Lance corporal	Private first class	Private	Recruit
Royal Danish Navy
Danish		Marineoverkonstabel	Marinekonstabel
Literal translation		Senior naval constable	Naval constable
Official translation		Able rating	Junior rating
Royal Danish Air Force
Danish		Flyveroverkonstabel	Flyverkonstabel	Flyverkonstabelelev
Literal translation		Senior air constable	Air constable	Air constable trainee
Official translation		Junior technician	Aircraftman	Recruit

=== Finland ===
In the Finnish Police, the lowest rank of police officer is called nuorempi konstaapeli, translated into English as (junior) constable.

The next rank is vanhempi konstaapeli or senior constable.

The next highest rank (equivalent to a police sergeant in the English-speaking world) is ylikonstaapeli (yli- "leading"), literally "over-constable".

=== Hong Kong ===
The Hong Kong Police Force have two ranks for constables:

- Senior constable—lead officer in a beat patrol; SPCs wear a single chevron on their shoulder above their unique identification (UI) number.
- Constable—officer in a beat patrol; PCs wear no insignia other than the unique identification (UI) number. PC is the lowest rank in the force. Trainees will need to undergo 27 weeks of foundation training and pass the Final Examination to be promoted to constable.

Senior constable is not a rank: it is merely a designation for officers who have served for 18 years.

=== India ===
Police constable (abbreviated PC) is the lowest police rank in India, below head constable. General law and order being a state subject in India, each state government recruits police constables. A police constable has no shoulder insignia, while a head constable has one or more stripes or chevrons, depending on the state. Since each state has its own police force, the uniforms and insignia of the police vary, though the rank structure is the same.

In the Kerala State Police, the designation used for personnel holding the rank of constable varies by branch. Constables serving in the Armed Police retain the designation Constable, while those serving in the Civil Police—also known as the Local Police or District Police—are designated as Civil Police Officer (CPO). Similarly, personnel of the rank of head constable in the Civil Police are designated as Senior Civil Police Officer (SCPO).

The Central Armed Police Forces (CAPF), under the Ministry of Home Affairs of the Government of India, also maintain the same ranks as state police even though their jurisdiction varies considerably, with the constables recruited to the CAPF having to do duty all over India. They perform duties such as maintaining internal security, border guarding, and counter-insurgency operations and riot control. Similarly, the Railway Protection Force (RPF) maintains the ranks of Constable and Head Constable. However, their duties and jurisdiction are specifically focused on the Indian railway network. RPF personnel are responsible for protecting railway property, preventing accidents, and ensuring passenger safety. Nearly all the police constables wear khaki-coloured uniforms, which indicate that they are police personnel.

Generally there are three types of constables in India, depending upon the unit, wing, branch or section they are attached to. Civil police constables are attached to a police station, traffic police constables control road traffic, telecommunication constables manage communications, whereas armed police constables are attached to armed police units. The types of constables are based on nature of their duties. The Indian police constables do a wide range of duties like patrol, beat system, crime detection, escorting of prisoners and VIPs, guarding vital offices and installations, vehicle traffic control on roads, riot control, assisting civil administration during disasters, epidemics and elections. Generally a police constable does his duty in his jurisdiction area, but can be assigned anywhere by his superiors depending on the situation or need. The duty hours of Indian police constables are erratic, many times without weekly time off or leave.

Police recruitment is based on a written test, plus physical and medical tests. After appointment all police constables have to undergo compulsory training; the duration of training may vary from nine months to one year depending on state. The training and duty of police is physically and mentally strenuous in India.

=== Jersey ===
In Jersey, the Connétables (English: Constables) are the civic heads of the island's 12 parishes. They sit in the States Assembly, Jersey's national parliament.

=== New Zealand ===
Rank epaulette insignia of a constable New Zealand Police

The New Zealand Police rank structure is heavily influenced by the Metropolitan Police rank structure and as such constable is the lowest sworn rank in the police service. There are three constable grades within the New Zealand Police, being probationary constable, constable and senior constable. The New Zealand Police does not have a chief constable instead having a commissioner which combines the role of chief executive and chief constable. The rank epaulette insignia of a probationary constable and constable is a lack of any insignia on the rank slide. The rank epaulette insignia of a senior constable is a single chevrons on the rank slide.

Constables in New Zealand have powers under the Policing Act 2008, a police employee receives these powers and becomes a constable by swearing the oath under section 22 of the Policing Act 2008. After becoming a sworn officer a police employee will leave the Royal New Zealand Police College and be promoted from recruit to probational constable. A probationary constable will be promoted to constable once they obtaining permanent appointment which is 10 workplace assessment standards which usually takes around two years. All police officers in the New Zealand Police are referred to in legislation as constables even if they are a sergeant or above and do not hold the rank of constable. For example the charge for assaulting a police officer is assaulting a constable even if the police officer assaulted was a sergeant or above and does not hold the rank title of constable.

Unlike many police services in the New Zealand Police, detectives are constables and do not outrank their frontline counterparts.

=== Norway ===
In the Norwegian Police Service the rank politikonstabel was until 2003 the lowest rank in the police, the next ranks being "politioverkonstabel", "politibetjent", "politiførstebetjent", "politioverbetjent" and "politistasjonssjef", "lensmann" or "sysselmannsoverbetjent" (all officially translated as chief superintendent). In 2003, the ranks "politikonstabel", "politioverkonstabel" and "politibetjent" were renamed "politibetjent 1", "politibetjent 2" and "politibetjent 3", where "politibetjent 1" is the entry-level rank for a policeman and most junior rank of the police service. All ranks higher than chief superintendent are commissioned ranks, known simply as "higher ranks", and traditionally required a law degree.

The Norwegian Police Service has an integrated prosecution service in which the police lawyers, who all hold higher ranks, require the law degree "candidatus/candidata juris" or "Master of Laws" (master i rettsvitenskap), awarded after five or six years of law studies. Following reforms of the police, a law degree is no longer required by law for all higher ranks, although only lawyers can act as prosecutors and supervise criminal investigations, for which reason it is still common for those holding higher ranks to be lawyers. The entry-level rank for a lawyer, junior police prosecutor, outranks the most senior rank for a policeman, chief superintendent, as the former is the most junior of the "higher ranks" whereas the latter is the most senior of the "lower ranks".

The fire brigades (all municipal) still use "konstabel" as in "brannkonstabel" (fire-constable).

In 2016 the Royal Norwegian Navy started using "konstabel" to describe the enlisted ranks in the navy. Other ranks (OR) 2 to 4+ all use the term "konstabel":

- OR 2 Visekonstabel
- OR 3 Ledende Visekonstabel
- OR 4 Konstabel
- OR 4+ Ledende Konstabel

=== Pakistan ===
In Pakistan, constable and head constable are, respectively, the lowest and second-lowest ranks in the police force. The police constables in Pakistan do a wide range of duties like patrol, crime detection, escort of prisoners and VIPs, vehicle traffic control on roads, riot control, assisting civil administration during disasters, epidemic, elections and other tasks.

=== Poland ===
In Poland, the constable (Polish: posterunkowy) is the lowest rank in the Police. The next rank in hierarchy is the senior constable (Polish: starszy posterunkowy), and then, the sergeant. To be promoted, the police officer has to serve as a constable for a year, and again for a year as a senior constable.

=== Singapore ===
In Singapore, a police constable (abbreviated to PC) is the lowest rank in the Singapore Police Force.

The rank of special constable exists, but is centralised under the Volunteer Special Constabulary in Singapore.

=== South Africa ===
Constable rank of the SAPS

In South Africa, this rank is the lowest in the South African Police Service.

=== Sri Lanka ===
In Sri Lanka, the Sri Lanka Police have the rank of "police constable", with four classes.

=== United Kingdom ===
An epaulette showing an officer's divisional code (DF) and individual number.

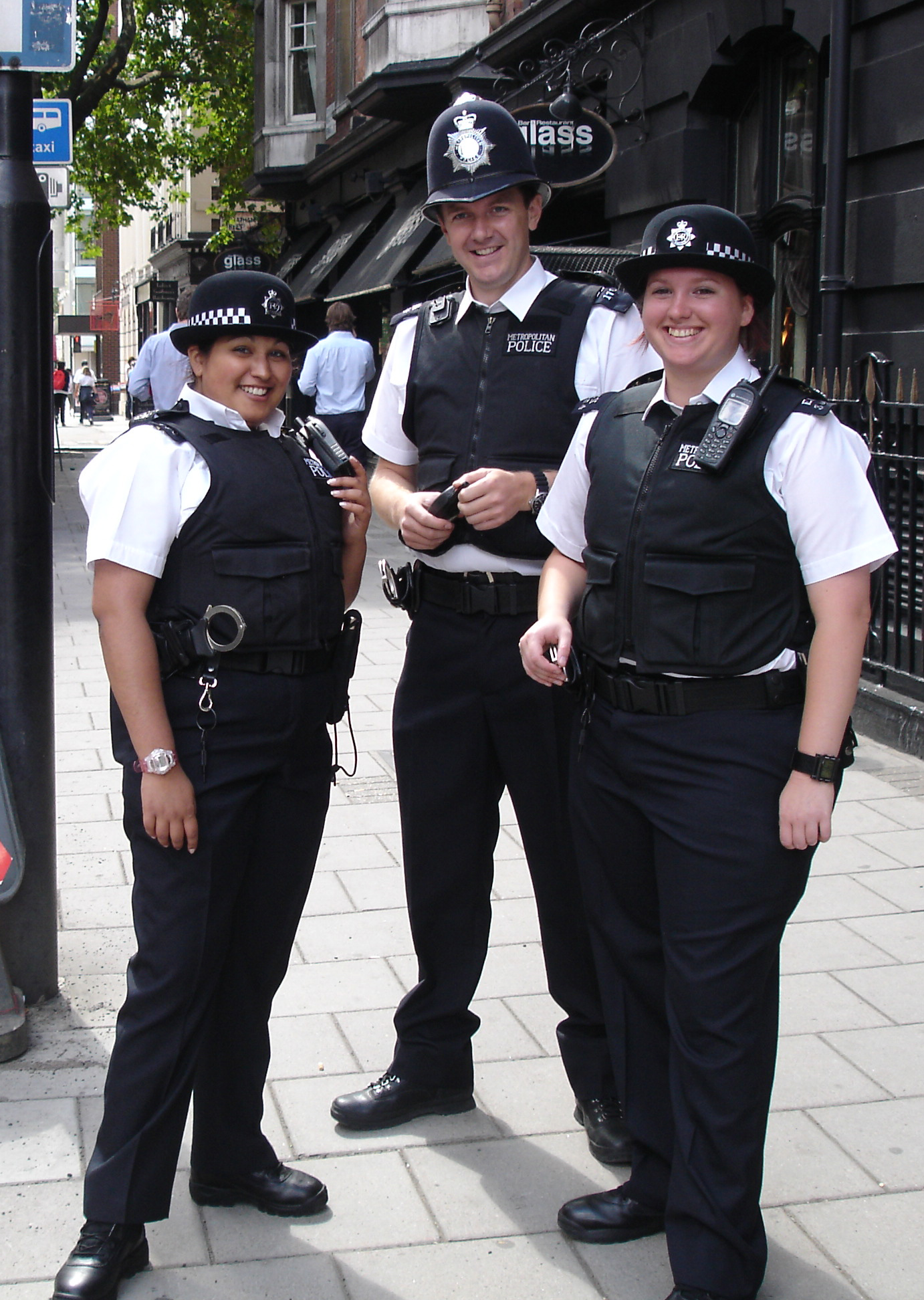
Police officers in the United Kingdom are holders of the office of constable.

There are two main definitions of a constable in the United Kingdom:

- The lowest rank of a police force.
- A legal term for an officer with the powers of a police officer.

The latter usage is mainly in formal contexts, including legislation such as the Police and Criminal Evidence Act 1984. By this definition all police officers are constables, even those that do not hold the actual rank of constable. The head of most police forces is a chief constable, volunteer officers of any rank are known as special constables, and some police forces have the word "Constabulary" in their name.

Detective constables (DC): In the United Kingdom, detective ranks are not superior to those of uniformed officers and a detective has the same powers and authority as a uniformed officer of the same rank. The "detective" prefix designates that the officer has received suitable training and passed related examinations to conduct serious or complex criminal investigations.

=== United States ===
In the United States, use of the term constable is varied, and use may differ within a state. A constable may be an official responsible for service of process, such as summonses and subpoenas for people to appear in court in criminal and/or civil matters; on the other hand, they can be fully empowered law enforcement officers. Constables may also have additional specialized duties unique to the office. In some states, a constable may be appointed by the governor or a judge or magistrate of the court which he or she serves; in others the constable is an elected or appointed position at the state or local level of local government. Their jurisdiction can vary from statewide to county/parish and local township boundaries based on the state's laws.

The office developed from its British counterpart during the colonial period. Prior to the modernization of law enforcement which took place in the mid-19th century, local law enforcement was performed by constables and watchmen. Constables were appointed or elected at the local level for specific terms and, like their UK counterparts the parish constable, were not paid and did not wear a uniform. However, they were often paid a fee by the courts for each writ served and warrant executed. Following the example of the British Metropolitan Police established in 1829, the states gradually enacted laws to permit municipalities to establish police departments. This differed from the UK in that the old system was not uniformly abolished in every state. Often the enacting legislation of the state conferred a police officer with the powers of a constable, the most important of these powers being the common law power of arrest. Police and constables exist concurrently in many jurisdictions. Perhaps because of this, the title "constable" is not used for police of any rank. The lowest rank in a police organization would be officer, deputy, patrolman, trooper and, historically, private, depending on the particular organization.

In many states, constables do not conduct patrols or preventive policing activities. In such states the office is relatively obscure to its citizens.

A constable may be assisted by deputy constables as sworn officers or constable's officers as civil staff, usually as process servers. In some states, villages or towns, an office with similar duties is marshal.

== Historical usage ==
=== Medieval Armenia and Georgia ===
The titles of sparapet and spaspet, derived from the ancient Iranian spahbod, were used to designate the supreme commander of the armed forces in the medieval kingdoms of Armenia and Georgia, respectively.

=== Byzantine Empire ===
The position of constable originated from the Roman Empire; by the 5th century AD the Count of the Stable (Latin: comes stabuli) was responsible for the keeping of horses at the imperial court. The West European term "constable" itself was adopted, via the Normans, as konostaulos in the Komnenian and Palaiologan periods, when it became a high military office of dignity.

Late Roman administrative titles were used by Charlemagne in developing his empire; the position of Constable, along with the similar office of Marshal, spread throughout the emerging states of Western Europe during this period. In most medieval nations, the constable was the highest-ranking officer of the army, and was responsible for the overseeing of martial law.

=== China ===
Village-level Chinese officials – known as tingzhang (Note: Chinese: t 亭長, s 亭长, p tíngzhǎng.) during the Qin and Han dynasties; lizheng (Note: Chinese: 里正, p lǐzhèng.) during the Sui and Tang; baozheng (Note: Chinese: 保正, p bǎozhèng.) during the Song; and dibao and shoubao during the Qing – are sometimes translated constable for their functions of reporting crimes and administering local justice, although they also served as tax agents and notaries.

=== France ===
The Constable of France (Connétable de France), under the French monarchy, was the First Officer of the Crown of France and was originally responsible for commanding the army. His symbol of office was a longsword held by a hand issuing out of a cloud, a reference to the constable's duty of carrying the king's sword during a coronation ceremony. Some constables were prominent military commanders in the medieval period, such as Bertrand du Guesclin who served from 1370 to 1380.

=== United Kingdom ===
The office of the constable was introduced in England following the Norman Conquest of 1066, and was responsible for the keeping and maintenance of the king's armaments and those of the villages as a measure of protecting individual settlements throughout the country. Some authorities place the origins of constables in England earlier, attributing the creation of the office to during the reign of King Alfred (871 A.D.).

The office of Lord High Constable, one of the Great Officers of State, was established in the kingdoms of England and Scotland during the reigns of King Stephen (1135–1154) and King David (1124–1154) respectively, and was responsible for the command of the army. However, the term was also used at the local level within the feudal system, describing an officer appointed to keep order. One of the first descriptions of one of the legal duties of a constable, that of the collation of evidence, comes from Bracton, a jurist writing between 1220 and 1250:

In whatever way they come and on whatever day, it is the duty of the constable to enroll everything in order, for he has record as to the things he sees; but he cannot judge, because there is no judgment at the Tower, since there the third element of a judicial proceeding is lacking, namely a judge and jurisdiction. He has record as to matters of fact, not matters of judgment and law.

In Bracton's time, anyone seeing a "misdeed" was empowered to make an arrest. The role of the constable in Bracton's description was as the "eyes and ears" of the court, finding evidence and recording facts on which judges could make a ruling. By extension, the constable was also the "strong arm" of the court (i.e., of the common law), marking the basic role of the constable that continues into the present day.

==== High constables ====
In 1285, King Edward I of England passed the Statute of Winchester, with provisions which "constituted two constables in every hundred to prevent defaults in towns and [on] highways". These were known as high constables, or hundred constables.

High constables were abolished by the High Constables Act 1869 (32 & 33 Vict. c. 47).

==== Parish constables ====
Petty constables or parish constables were elected at the court leet by the parishioners, but from 1622 onwards justices of the peace (magistrates) in each county became able to swear them in, in the absence of an appointment by the court leet.

The system of policing by unpaid parish constables continued in England until the 19th century; in the London metropolitan area it started to be ended with the creation of the Metropolitan Police by the Metropolitan Police Act 1829, and was completely ended by the Metropolitan Police Act 1839. Outside London, the mandatory introduction of county police forces by the County and Borough Police Act 1856, after nearly 20 years of the permissive County Police Act 1839, finally ended parish constables. After 1856, all areas of England and Wales were covered by a police force. The lowest rank of the police forces and constabularies is "constable", and most outside London are headed by a chief constable.

The appointment of parish constables was no longer mandated following the Parish Constables Act 1872 (35 & 36 Vict. c. 92). The last parish constables were appointed before the First World War, when the position fell into disuse.

==== Parks constable ====
The office of parks constable was first created when section 221 of the Liverpool Corporation Act 1921 (11 & 12 Geo. 5. c. lxxiv) allowed for their appointment; prior to that a body of constables, whom were attested as special constables, had policed the parks. Specific legislation for the Royal Parks of London, the Parks Regulation Act 1872, continued the unique office of 'Parks Constable'. However, the Royal Parks Constabulary was disbanded in 2001. The Kew Constabulary are sworn in under the same legislation and remain as the holders of the office of Parks Constable. Whilst some local authorities have parks constabularies, their officers are attested as constables, not parks constables.

=== Other European nations ===
The position of hereditary constable persists in some current or former monarchies of Europe. The position of Lord High Constable of Scotland is hereditary in the family of the Earl of Erroll. There is also a hereditary constable of Navarre in Spain; this position is currently held by the Duke of Alba.

Historically, many other hereditary constables existed as officers of state in former monarchies. Examples are the Constable of Castile (Condestable de Castilla) and the Constable of Portugal (Condestável do Reino).

== See also ==
- Marshal
- Policing in the United Kingdom
- Policing in the United States
- Sheriff
- Individuals with powers of arrest
- Police
- Chief of police
- Highway patrol
- Constable of Chester
