= Police oath =

Official promise by law enforcement officer to lawfully fulfill their duties

It is usual for police officers take an oath to uphold the law. The following is a selection from different countries.

== Hong Kong ==
English version according to Chapter 232, schedule 1, Laws of Hong Kong

I, .. <Officer's Name> .. (swear by Almighty God/ do solemnly and sincerely declare) that I will well and faithfully serve the Government of Hong Kong Special Administrative Region according to law as a police officer, that I will obey uphold and maintain the laws of the Hong Kong Special Administrative Region that I will execute the powers and duties of my office honestly, faithfully and diligently without fear of or favour to any person and with malice or ill-will toward none, and that I will obey without question all lawful orders of those set in authority over me.

Prior to the handover of Hong Kong in 1997, the oath for the Royal Hong Kong Police Force was the same except "the Government of the Hong Kong Special Administrative Region" was replaced by "Her Majesty and Her heirs and successors". It was announced that serving officers would not have to take the oath again following the handover.

== Ireland ==
English form

Section 16(1) of the Garda Síochána Act 2005 requires each member of the Garda Síochána to make the following solemn declaration when they are appointed:

I hereby solemnly and sincerely declare before God that I will faithfully discharge the duties of a member of the Garda Síochána with fairness, integrity, regard for human rights, diligence and impartiality, upholding the Constitution and the laws and according equal respect to all people, while I continue to be a member, I will to the best of my skill and knowledge discharge all my duties according to law, and I do not belong to, and will not while I remain a member form, belong to or subscribe to, any political party or secret society whatsoever.

Section 16(2) allows the words "before God" to be omitted from the declaration at the request of the declarant.

Irish form

Provision to make the above declaration in Irish is not made within the above Act. As of 3 July 2008 the translated version is not yet available on the Irish Statute Book website.

== New Zealand ==
Section 22 of the Policing Act 2008 prescribes an oath in the following form:-

English form

I, [name], swear that I will faithfully and diligently serve His Majesty The King, Charles III of New Zealand, his heirs and successors, without favour or affection, malice or ill-will. While a constable I will, to the best of my power, keep the peace and prevent offences against the peace, and will, to the best of my skill and knowledge, perform all the duties of the office of constable according to law. So help me God.

Māori form

Tēnei au, a [ingoa], e kī taurangi nei, ka rato pirihonga, urupū hoki ahau i Te Arikinui, a [tohua te ingoa o te Arikinui kei runga i te torona], Kuini (Kīngi rānei) o Niu Tīreni, me ōna uri whakaheke, i roto i te kore tautoko, kore aroha rānei, kore mahi kino, kore whakaaro kino rānei. I ahau e pirihimana ana ka pōkaikaha ahau ki te hohou i te rongo me te kaupare atu i ngā mahi kotikoti i te rongo, ā, i roto i ōku tino pūkenga me ōku mōhio, ka whakatutuki i ngā mahi kua whakaritea hei mahi mā te pirihimana e ai ki te ture. Nō reira, āwhina mai i ahau e te Atua.

== United Kingdom ==
In British legislation, an oath taken by a constable in England and Wales or in Northern Ireland is described as an "attestation" and annotated as such in a relevant Act. In Scotland a constable is required to make a "declaration".

=== England and Wales ===
==== Territorial police constables ====
The 43 territorial police forces in England and Wales are responsible for general policing. Members of these police forces are attested under section 29 of the Police Act 1996. The prescribed form of words is that given by schedule 4 to the Act (inserted by section 83 of the Police Reform Act 2002), as follows:

English

I (name) ...of (address)... do solemnly and sincerely declare and affirm that I will well and truly serve The King in the office of constable, with fairness, integrity, diligence and impartiality, upholding fundamental human rights and according equal respect to all people; and that I will, to the best of my power, cause the peace to be kept and preserved and prevent all offences against people and property; and that while I continue to hold the said office I will to the best of my skill and knowledge discharge all the duties thereof faithfully according to law.

Welsh

Rwyf i ...o ...yn datgan ac yn cadarnhau yn ddifrifol ac yn ddiffuant y byddaf yn gwasanaethu'r Brebin yn dda ac yn gywir yn fy swydd o heddwas (heddferch), yn deg, yn onest, yn ddiwyd ac yn ddiduedd, gan gynnal hawliau dynol sylfaenol a chan roddi'r un parch i bob person; ac y byddaf i, hyd eithaf fy ngallu, yn achosi i'r heddwch gael ei gadw a'i ddiogelu ac yn atal pob trosedd yn erbyn pobl ac eiddo; a thra byddaf yn parhau i ddal y swydd ddywededig y byddaf i, hyd eithaf fy sgil a'm gwybodaeth, yn cyflawni'r holl ddyletswyddau sy'n gysylltiedig â hi yn ffyddlon yn unol â'r gyfraith.

==== Park constables ====
Constables obtaining their powers from the Parks Regulation Act 1872 are required to be "attested as a constable by making a declaration before a justice of the peace that he will duly execute the office of constable" with no specific words prescribed in the Act. The only constables still attested under this Act are those of Kew Constabulary. The Royal Parks Constabulary, whose officers were formerly attested under this Act, was disbanded in 2003.

Constables obtaining their powers from the Ministry of Housing and Local Government Provisional Order Confirmation (Greater London Parks and Open Spaces) Act 1967 are required to be attested in accordance with that Act. These include staff employed to protect parks in individual boroughs in Greater London. Examples include the Wandsworth Parks Police and the Hampstead Heath Constabulary.

=== Scotland ===
Constables in Scotland are required to make the declaration given in s.10 of the Police and Fire Reform (Scotland) Act 2012 on appointment. The declaration must be made before a sheriff or justice of the peace.

I, do solemnly, sincerely and truly declare and affirm that I will faithfully discharge the duties of the office of constable with fairness, integrity, diligence and impartiality, and that I will uphold fundamental human rights and accord equal respect to all people, according to law.

Prior to 1 April 2013 constables in Scotland were required to make a declaration on appointment by s.16 of the Police (Scotland) Act 1967 "in such terms as may be prescribed". The words prescribed by the Police (Scotland) Regulations 2004 were as follows:

I hereby do solemnly and sincerely declare and affirm that I will faithfully discharge the duties of the office of constable.

The wording was first given statutory effect under the Police (Scotland) Act 1857 and remained largely similar to that form until replaced by the declaration required by the Police and Fire Reform (Scotland) Act 2012.

=== Northern Ireland ===
Police officers of the Police Service of Northern Ireland are attested under section 38 of the Police (Northern Ireland) Act 2000. The terms are prescribed by that section, and are as follows:

I hereby do solemnly and sincerely and truly declare and affirm that I will faithfully discharge the duties of the office of constable, with fairness, integrity, diligence and impartiality, upholding fundamental human rights and according equal respect to all individuals and their traditions and beliefs; and that while I continue to hold the said office I will to the best of my skill and knowledge discharge all the duties thereof according to law.

=== Other constables ===
Constables and special constables of the British Transport Police are required by sections 24 and 25 of the Railways and Transport Safety Act 2003 to make different attestations/declarations depending on where they are appointed. In England and Wales, BTP constables take the same oath as prescribed by the Police Act 1996 for a territorial police constable, and in Scotland make the same declaration that as prescribed under the Police (Scotland) Regulations 2004 for a territorial police constable. The location of the declaration/attestation, and the words used, make no difference to the extent of the constable's jurisdiction.

Members of the Ministry of Defence Police are required—as with BTP constables—to take the oath that a territorial police constable would in the country in which they are attested. The same applies to members of the Civil Nuclear Constabulary, though in Scotland they are required to only make a "declaration faithfully to execute the duties of the office of a member of the Civil Nuclear Constabulary".

Civilian security officers belonging to the Northern Ireland Security Guard Service are attested by a resident magistrate as a special constable whilst on duty within Ministry of Defence property.
