= Royal Constabulary =

Royal Constabulary may refer to:

- Royal Irish Constabulary
- Royal Newfoundland Constabulary
- Royal Papua New Guinea Constabulary
- Royal Parks Constabulary
- Royal Ulster Constabulary
