= Port of Felixstowe Police =

Specialised container port police in Suffolk, England

Agency overview
- Formed: 1975
- Employees: 30 police 64 security guards

Jurisdictional structure
- Operations jurisdiction: UK
- Legal jurisdiction: Port of Felixstowe and up to 1-mile (1.6 km) from boundary.
- Constituting instrument: Harbours, Docks and Piers Clauses Act 1847
- General nature: Civilian police

Operational structure
- Headquarters: Police Dept, Port of Felixstowe, The Dock, IP11 3SY
- Constables: 24
- Security guards: 64
- Agency executive: J Whitby, Chief Police Officer

Facilities
- Stations: 1

Website
- www.portoffelixstowe.co.uk/port/health-and-safety

The Port of Felixstowe Police is a non-Home Office ports police force established in 1975, responsible for policing the Port of Felixstowe in Felixstowe, Suffolk, United Kingdom.

== Jurisdiction ==
Officers of this force are sworn in as special constables under section 79 of the Harbours, Docks, and Piers Clauses Act 1847, as incorporated by section 3(1)(e) of the Felixstowe Dock and Railway Act 1956. As a result, officers have the full powers of a constable on any land owned by the Port of Felixstowe and at any place within one mile of any owned land. The Port Police operate their own small fleet of liveried police cars and vans. Additional security is provided by MITIE.

== Establishment ==
The force is commanded by the Chief Police Officer (currently J I Whitby), and is additionally made up of one inspector, four sergeants and 18 constables. Two controllers and one secretary support the force.

Constables work in one of four watches, designated 'A Watch', 'B Watch', 'C Watch', and 'D Watch', each supervised by a sergeant. For operational reasons, each watch requires a deputy supervisor, for which purpose four constables (one per watch) are afforded the rank of acting sergeant. As this is not a substantive rank, they are referenced as constables in policing statistics. The four watches report to the inspector, who as operations officer also supervises the control room and its two controllers.

The 24 sworn police officers are assisted by three administrative staff and 64 contract security guards, who carry out routine gate control and search duties.

=== Station sergeant ===
The rank of station sergeant was once common in British police forces, but was phased out of most forces between 1973 and 1989. After 1989 the Port of Felixstowe Police held the distinction of being the only British police force to retain this historic rank. A single station sergeant functioned as a deputy to the inspector. In 2015, on the retirement of Inspector M Hayward, the last station sergeant (Station Sergeant A Miaoulis) was promoted to inspector, and the rank of station sergeant was abolished.

=== Rank table ===
The following table illustrates the ranks used in the force.

Port of Felixstowe Police ranks
Rank	Chief officer (Chief inspector)	Inspector	Station sergeant (Until 2015)	Sergeant	Police constable
Insignia					

Notes:
Exact formats vary between uniform types.
The illustrations are generic and illustrative.
The collar numbers are typical of this police force.

== Operations ==
The Port of Felixstowe Police has self-defined its operational responsibilities under eight headings:

- Security at the port
- Police protection to persons and property (including cargo)
- Facilitating lawful free movement
- Enforcing ISPS security code
- Police assistance at incidents, accidents, and emergencies
- Traffic management for the port complex (and outside the port, in conjunction with Suffolk Constabulary)
- Escorting abnormal or specialist loads
- Crime prevention, and crime reduction advice

The local Home Office police force, Suffolk Constabulary, are responsible for dealing with serious crime incidents within the port.

== See also ==
- Law enforcement in the United Kingdom
- List of law enforcement agencies in the United Kingdom
