= Kew Constabulary =

Special police force in the UK

Coordinates: 51°28.5′N 0°17.5′W

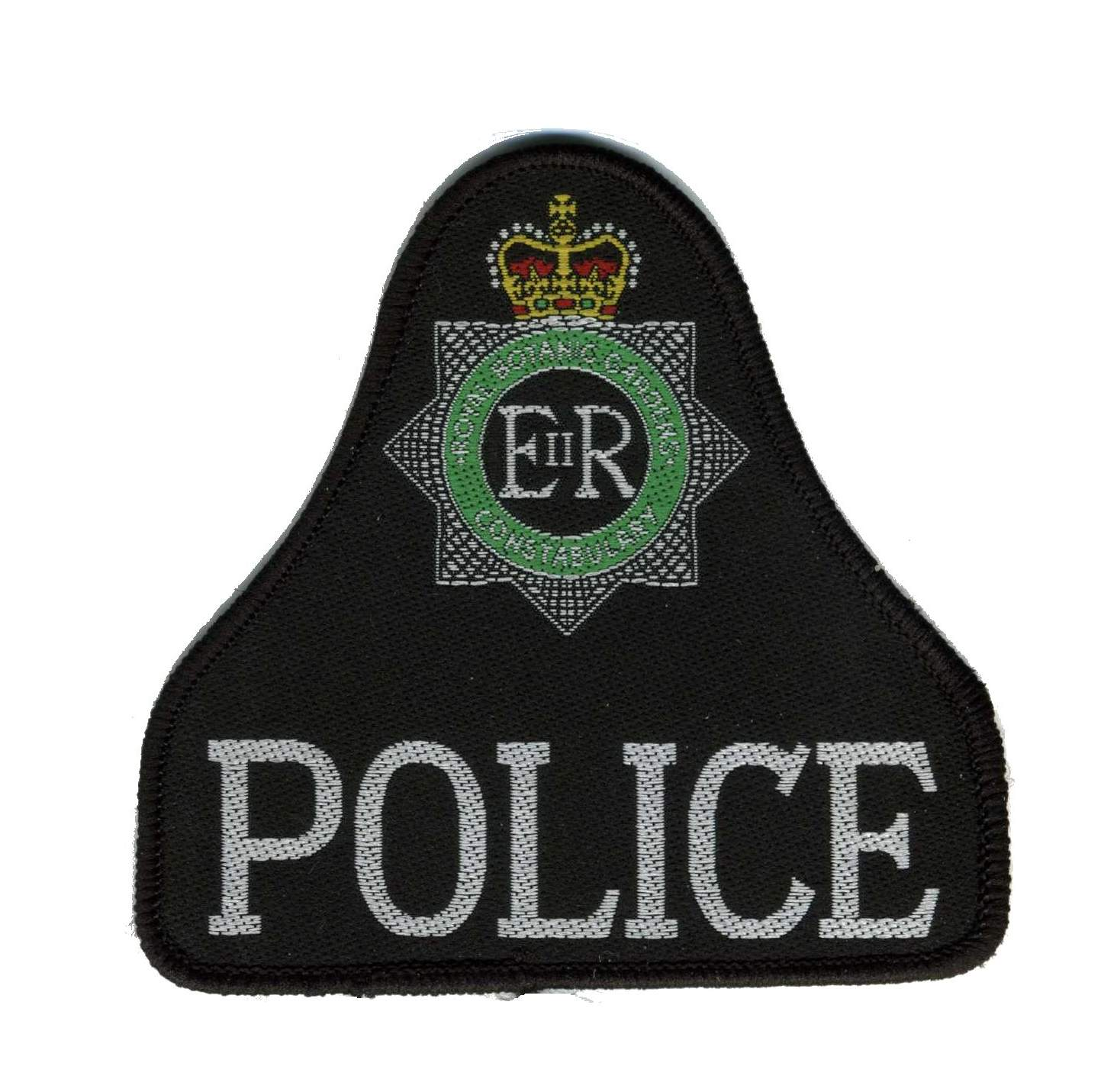
Patch bearing the emblem of the Royal Botanic Gardens Constabulary, which continues to be used by the Kew Constabulary

The Kew Constabulary (formerly the Royal Botanic Gardens Constabulary) is a small, specialised constabulary responsible for policing the Royal Botanic Gardens at Kew in Richmond-upon-Thames, England.

The constabulary consists of a sworn security manager/chief officer, two section leaders/sergeants, eight constables and four non-sworn operations team members (responsible for CCTV / the Control Room / the Pass Office). As of 2017, the force had 20 members of staff.

== History ==
The Kew Constables are attested under section 3 of the Parks Regulation Act 1872. Such constables have "in addition to any powers and immunities specially conferred on him by this Act, shall, within the limits of the park of which he is park constable, have all such powers, privileges, and immunities, and be liable to all such duties and responsibilities, as any police constable has within the police area in which such park is situated". As a result, constables of this very small constabulary have the powers of constables of the Metropolitan Police within the land belonging to the Royal Botanic Gardens in addition to those powers possessed as a Kew Constable but without being sworn as constables under the legislation applicable to the Metropolitan Police. These constables rarely use their police powers and generally perform a patrol and ranger service.

Kew Gardens is situated within the Metropolitan Police District, and as such, the Metropolitan Police Service is the police force with statutory responsibility for providing policing services to Kew Gardens with any substantial, serious or major policing incidents always being referred to the MPS. The Kew Constabulary have no power to instigate proceedings for an offence committed within their jurisdiction via the Prosecution of Offences Act 1985. Kew Constabulary do however provide an enhanced policing patrol presence within the parks which the MPS would be unable to provide due to other wider commitments and a good working relationship is maintained between the MPS and the Kew constables.

The Kew Constabulary are attested under the Parks Regulation Act 1872, which was amended by the Parks Regulation (Amendment) Act 1974. This amendment included the provision to allow for the appointment of Parks Constables for the parks included within the original legislation.

The Parks Regulation Act 1872 included the provision for appointing park keepers, who had the full powers of a police constable of the local police force within the relevant park. However, the park keepers were faced with increased hostility and it was felt necessary to give them the full status of a constable, even though they would not have any increased powers. A working party was formed by the Department of Environment and they visited the Liverpool Parks Police in 1872 to examine their model of policing parks.

The amended Parks Regulation Act 1872 gives Kew Constabulary police powers within all the parks to which the legislation applies. Whilst there is nothing to suggest that Kew Constabulary Police Officers would ever find themselves exercising their police powers in another park, this legislative quirk remains nonetheless.

Many parks listed within the legislation have been transferred from the control of the Crown and government departments to local authorities, whereby the legislation is believed to no longer apply. This includes, for example, Battersea Park and Victoria Park.

Nonetheless, during more recent years the Kew Constabulary have theoretically possessed police powers in Parliament Square until it was transferred to the control of the Greater London Authority by the Greater London Authority Act 1999.

Although the Kew Constabulary was a separate organisation from the Royal Parks Constabulary, it had police powers in the Royal Parks until the original Parks Regulation Act 1872 was amended by section 162 of the Serious Organised Crime and Police Act 2005.

== See also ==
- Law enforcement in the United Kingdom
- List of law enforcement agencies in the United Kingdom
