= Simon Gudgeon =

British sculptor

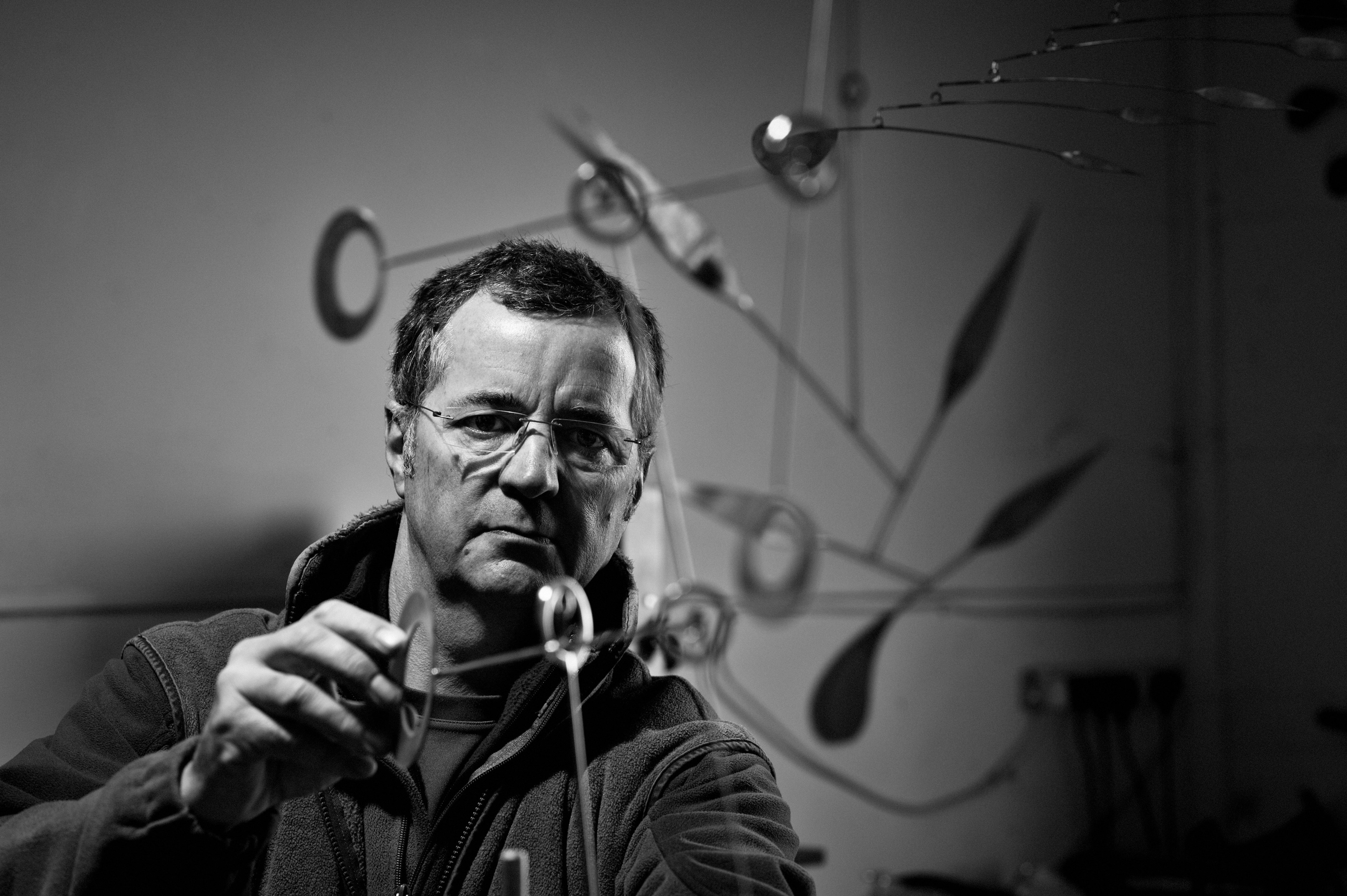
- Born: 1958 (age 67–68)
- Notable work: Isis; Deckchairs
- Gudgeon's voice recorded August 2015
- Website: www.simongudgeon.com

Simon Gudgeon (born 1958) is a British sculptor specialising in large pieces for public display, usually in bronze, but also sometimes glass or stainless steel. He operates his own sculpture park.

== Early life ==
Gudgeon qualified in law and only took up sculpture at the age of 40.

== Sculpture park ==
He operates his own 26 acres (11 ha) sculpture park near Tincleton, Dorchester, England.

== Isis ==
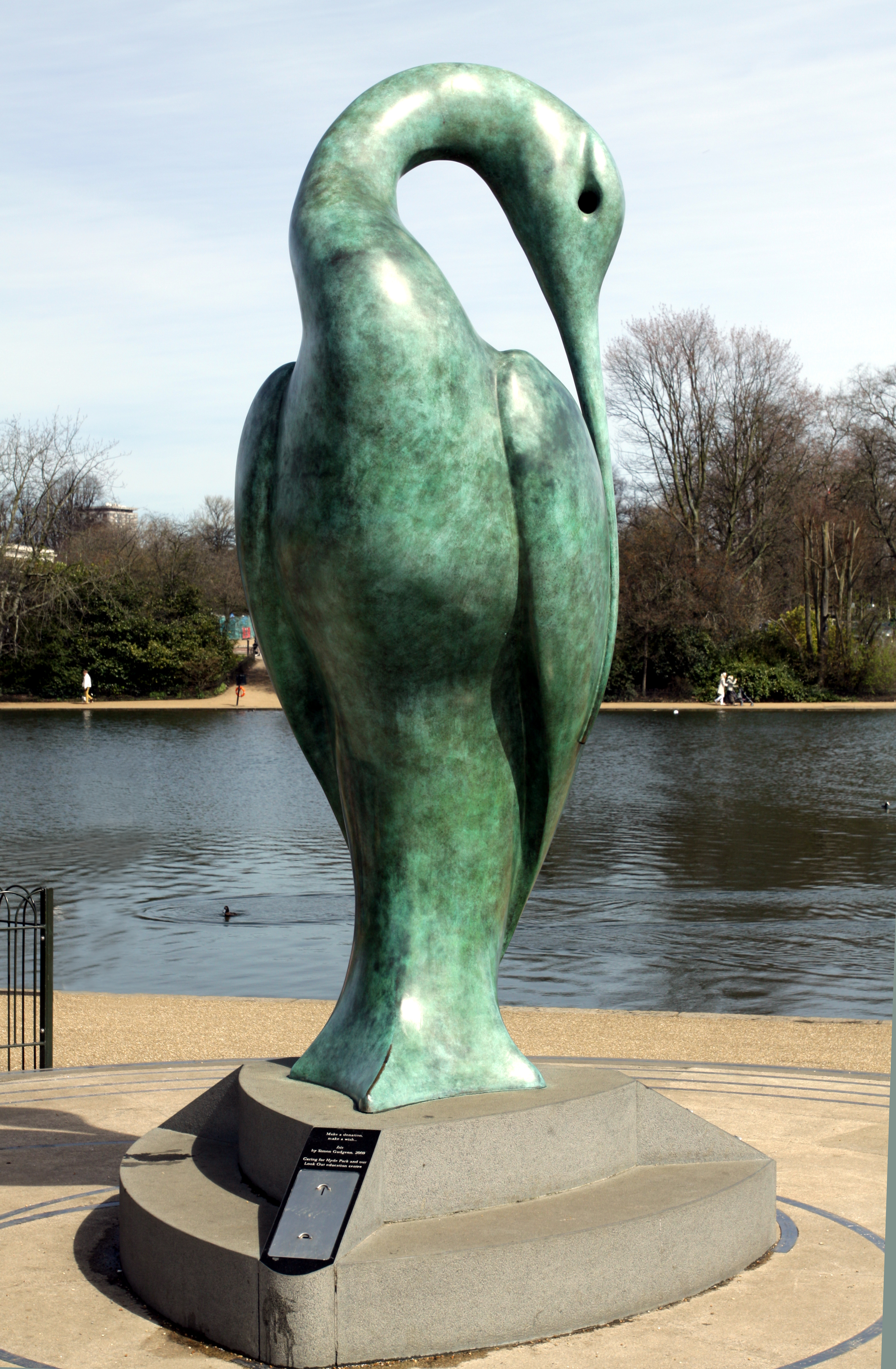
Isis

A number of his works are in public collections, including Isis, displayed in Hyde Park, London, unveiled 7 September 2009. 1,000 plaques around the base were sold to donors for personalised inscriptions at £1,000 each, as a way of funding the park's Isis Education Centre for introducing young people to the study of nature. The work was donated to the park by the Halcyon Gallery.

Other casts of Isis are at Prince Charles' Highgrove House in Gloucestershire and at the United States' National Museum of Wildlife Art.

== Works ==
- 2009: Isis, Hyde Park, London
- 2010: Deckchair, for Deckchair Dreams
- 2011: Search for Enlightenment, One Hyde Park, London
