= Tony Speed =

British police officer

Tony Speed CBE QPM DL

Assistant Commissioner Area No. 1 (Central Area), Metropolitan Police
- In office 1994–1999

Personal details
- Born: Anthony James Speed

Anthony James Speed CBE QPM DL is a British retired police officer with the London Metropolitan Police. He specialised in public order policing and headed the policing of many demonstrations and other public order events during his career.

As a sergeant, Speed served as protection officer to Charles, Prince of Wales, during his term at the University College of Wales, Aberystwyth, in 1969. In 1983, as a chief superintendent, he was put in command of Brixton, a post he still held in 1985. A year later he was a commander in charge of specialist training. By 1991, he had been promoted to deputy assistant commissioner and was in charge of policing central London.

On 19 August 1994, he was promoted to assistant commissioner and put in command of Area No. 1 (Central Area) following the Metropolitan Police reorganisation which saw expansion from four to six assistant commissioners, all but one placed in charge of one of the five operational areas. He held this post until he retired in 1999, following which the force reverted to having four assistant commissioners each in charge of a portfolio instead of an operational area. During this time he chaired the Association of Chief Police Officers sub-committee on public order.

Following his retirement, Speed was asked to head an investigation into the Carnival Against Capital riots in the City of London on 18 June 1999 and the response of the City of London Police. His report a month later was highly critical of the force. In 2000, he conducted a review of the Royal Parks Constabulary which led to a number of charges being implemented and its eventual merger with the Metropolitan Police in 2004.

Speed was awarded the Queen's Police Medal (QPM) in the 1991 Birthday Honours and appointed Commander of the Order of the British Empire (CBE) in the 1999 New Year Honours. He was appointed a deputy lieutenant for Greater London in July 1999.

Speed was a freemason for twenty years from the age of 21, but resigned after public opinion began to turn against police officers being members.

== Footnotes ==
Police appointments
Preceded by First incumbent	Assistant Commissioner Area No. 1 (Central Area), Metropolitan Police; 1994–1999	Succeeded by Last incumbent
