= Parks Regulation (Amendment) Act 1926 =

Act of the Parliament of the United Kingdom

Parks Regulation (Amendment) Act 1926 (Note: Section 4.)
- Act of Parliament
- Parliament of the United Kingdom
- Long title: An Act to amend the Parks Regulation Act, 1872.
- Citation: 16 & 17 Geo. 5. c. 36
- Territorial extent: England and Wales; Scotland; (Note: Section 4(3).)

Dates
- Royal assent: 15 December 1926
- Commencement: 15 December 1926 (Note: The Acts of Parliament (Commencement) Act 1793.)
Other legislation
| Amends | Parks Regulation Act 1872] |
| Amended by | Statute Law Revision Act 1950; Transfer of Functions (Ministry of Food) Order 1955; Criminal Procedure (Scotland) Act 1975; Criminal Justice Act 1982; Statute Law (Repeals) Act 1989; Police Reform and Social Responsibility Act 2011 |

Status: Amended

History of passage through Parliament

Text of statute as originally enacted

Text of the Parks Regulation (Amendment) Act 1926 as in force today (including any amendments) within the United Kingdom, from legislation.gov.uk.

The Parks Regulation (Amendment) Act 1926 (16 & 17 Geo. 5. c. 36) is an act of the Parliament of the United Kingdom that amended the Parks Regulation Act 1872 (35 & 36 Vict. c. 15). It altered the earlier act's remit from "all parks, gardens, recreation grounds, open spaces and other land" managed or controlled by the "Commissioners of Her Majesty's Works and Public Buildings" to those managed or controlled by the "Commissioners of Works" (or in the case of Kew Gardens the Minister of Agriculture and Fisheries), though the provisions of the 1872 act's first schedule were only to apply to parks where they had already been in effect immediately before the 1926 act came into effect (Section 1). It also transferred the regulation-making powers of the 1872 acts to the Commissioners of Works and the Minister of Agriculture and Fisheries (Section 2).
