= Royal Parks Foundation =

English charity

The Royal Parks Foundation was a registered charity established in 2003 (registered charity number 1097545). It helped support London's eight Royal Parks. The charity's patron was the Prince of Wales.

The Royal Parks Foundation supported The Royal Parks Agency - a former agency of the Department for Digital, Culture, Media and Sport (DCMS) in caring for the eight Royal Parks.

The Royal Parks Foundation is no longer active and its website no longer exists. The parks are now managed by The Royal Parks, an organisation founded in 2017.

== Deckchair Dreams ==
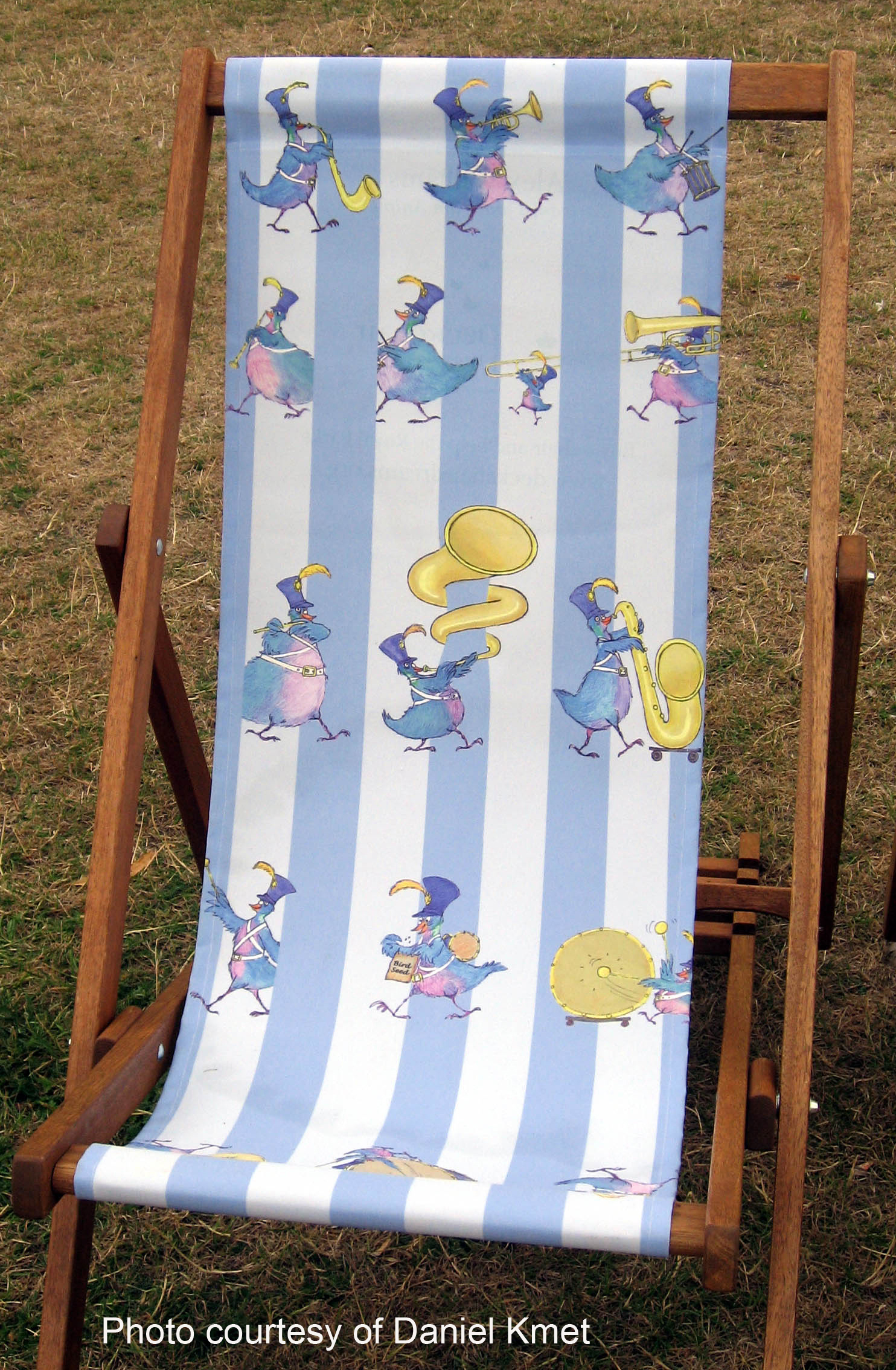
2010 Deckchair by Alexander Williams.

As part of its annual fund-raising efforts, the Foundation promoted Deckchair Dreams, through which artists donated individual works of art for the canvases of deck chairs which were reproduced and distributed through the Parks.

Among the artists and celebrities who contributed to the scheme are Damien Hirst, Will Young, Antony Worrall Thompson, Tracey Emin, Alexander McQueen, and Raymond Briggs.

Deckchairs from the 2008 collection were recycled into sling bags, made by designer Bill Amberg.

=== 2010 ===
The 2010 collection of deckchairs drew on themes of nuts, fruits and seeds in the parks, and represented a partnership with the Shanghai Botanical Gardens, including designs by British and Chinese artists.

British designers included the milliner Philip Treacy, Rob Kesseler, cartoonists Ronald Searle and Alexander Williams, and the wildlife sculptor Simon Gudgeon. Treacy's design featured an illustration of model Linda Evangelista wearing one of his hats.

Around 700 chairs were made available across Kensington Gardens, Hyde Park, Green Park, St. James's Park and Regent's Park. Sara Lom of the Royal Parks Foundation said it had been "wonderful to partner with Shanghai" on the project.
