= Royal Parks Operational Command Unit =

English police unit in London

The Royal Parks Operational Command Unit, also known as the Royal Parks Police, is a unit of the Metropolitan Police which has responsibility for policing the Royal Parks found in central London. Core police teams patrol the 17 royal parks, gardens and other open spaces within the Metropolitan Police District – an area in excess of 6,000 acres (24 km^{2}).

Spread across the five boroughs in which the various Parks are located, the pan-London service given by the Royal Parks Operational Command Unit is in addition to that provided by local borough police. The unit is currently commanded by a Superintendent. While the focus of the unit across most of London is policing crime and disorder, certain parks such as Richmond Park emphasise 'environmental policing' for breaches of park regulations.

The OCU began to take over policing responsibility for the parks in April 2004 during a period of transfer of functions from the Royal Parks Constabulary (RPC). The RPC was finally abolished as a constabulary in 2006. Between 2004 and 2015, the number of police in the unit was reduced from 160 to 105 officers.

Between 2004 and 2011, the number of crimes recorded in all Royal Parks rose from 916 to 2,373. According to the Metropolitan Police, this was due to more 'proactive policing' for drug offences; the majority of arrests were for cannabis possession.

The OCU is responsible for policing Abingdon Street Garden; the Barge Walk Hampton Court; Brompton Cemetery; Bushy Park; the Longford River, and those parts of its banks which are for the time being under the control of the Department for Digital, Culture, Media and Sport; Greenwich Park; Grosvenor Square Gardens; Hyde Park; Kensington Gardens; Primrose Hill; Regent's Park; Richmond Park; St. James's Park; Green Park; Victoria Tower Gardens.

In April 2025, the Metropolitan Police announced plans to disband the Royal Parks Police by 1 November 2025 due to its portion of the police's national £260 million funding gap.
