= The Royal Parks =

Collection of parks originally owned by the royal family

- Type: Charity
- Location: Hyde Park, London, England
- Region served: United Kingdom
- Chief Executive: Andrew Scattergood
- Staff: 244 (2023)
- Website: www.royalparks.org.uk

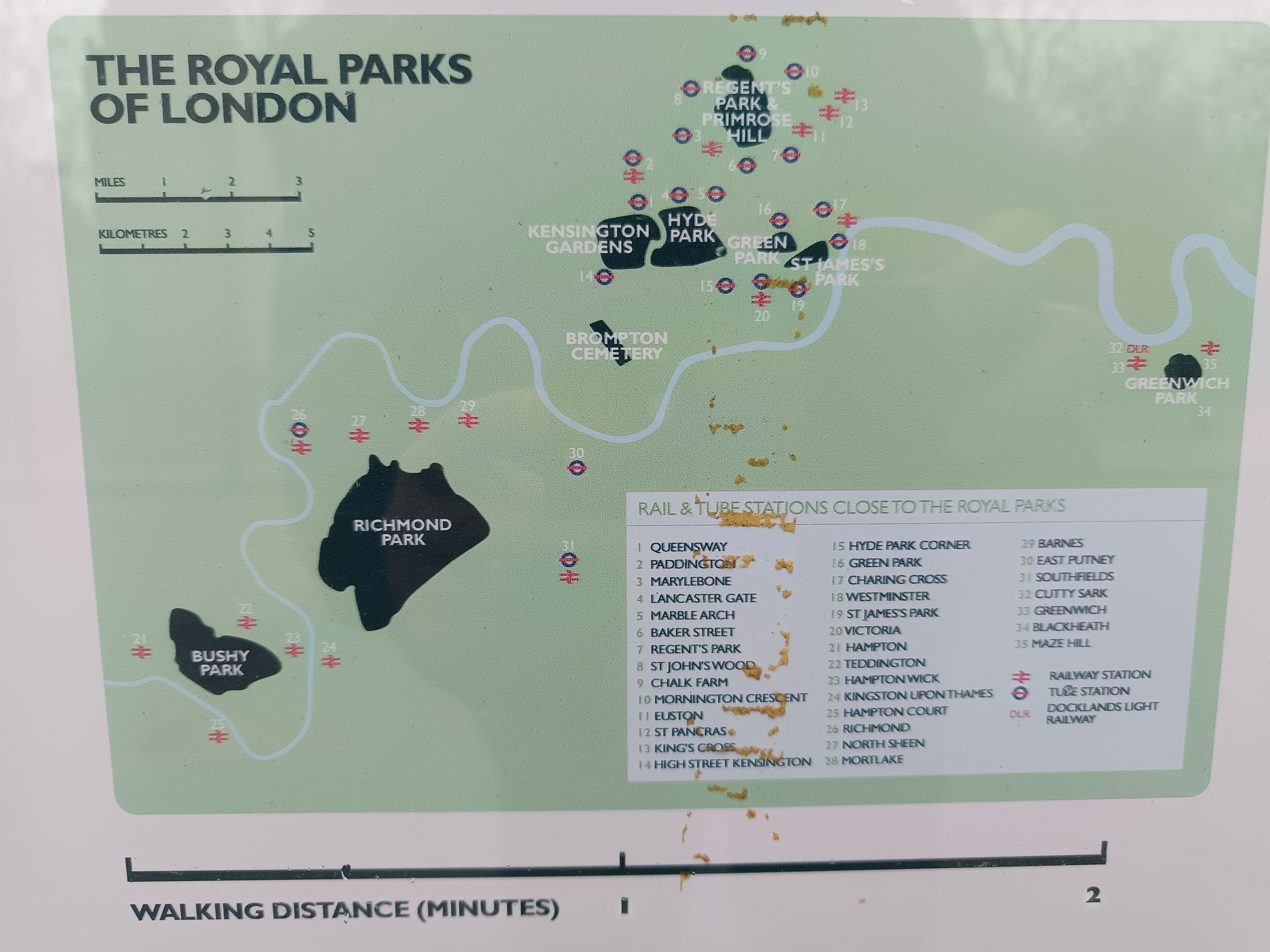
Map of the Royal Parks of London

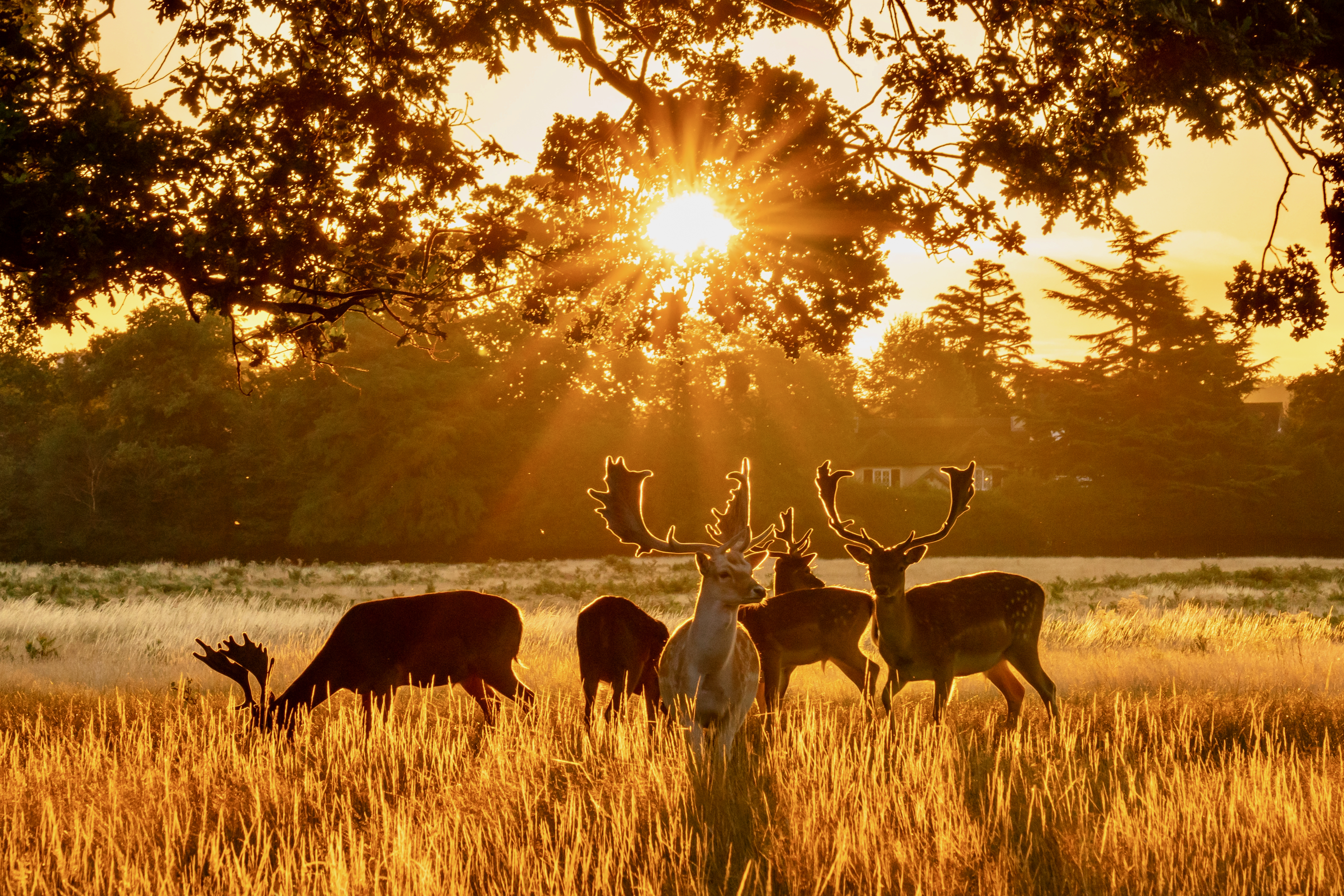
Herd of fallow deer in Bushy Park

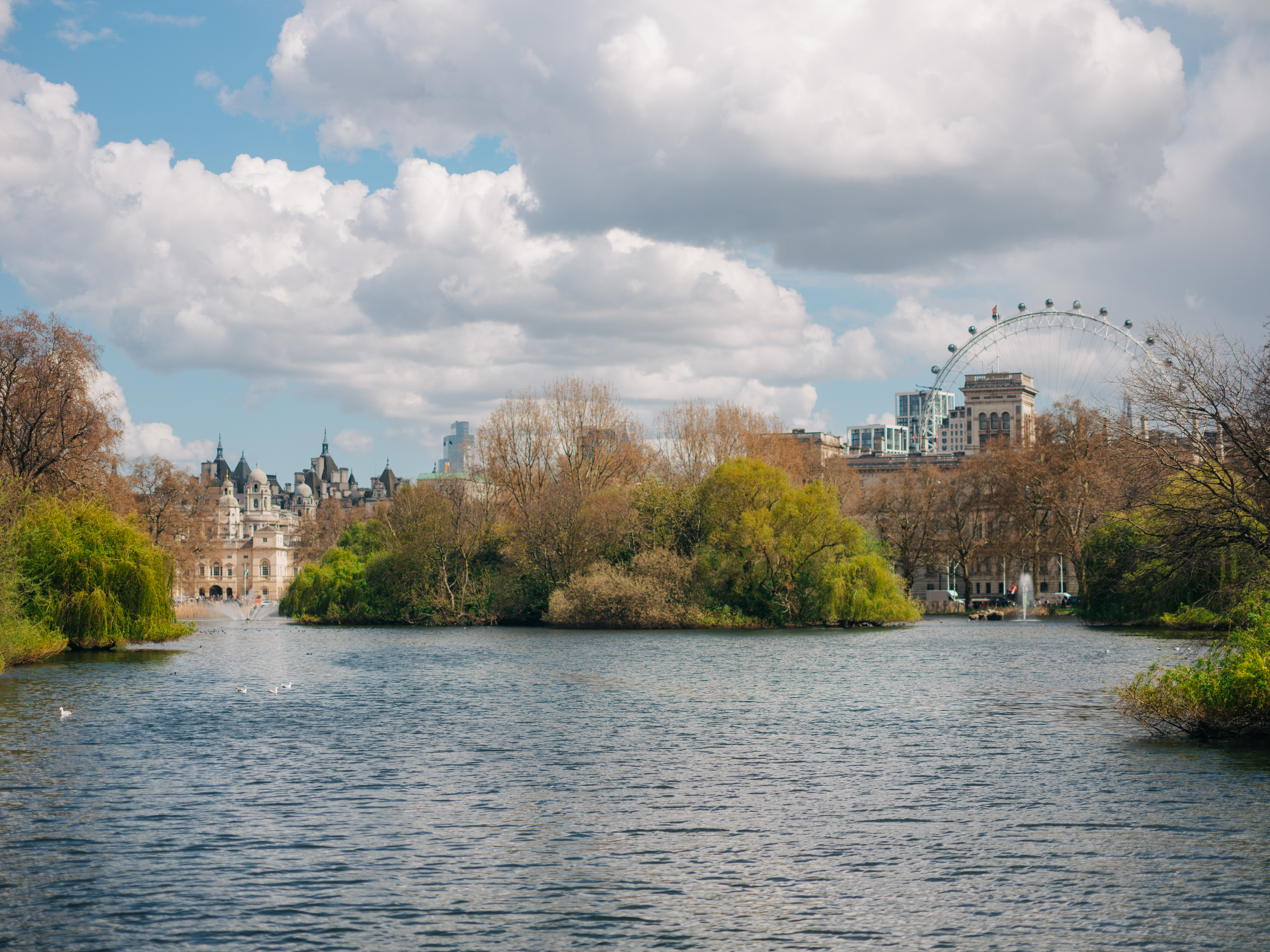
View towards Horse Guards Parade in St. James's Park

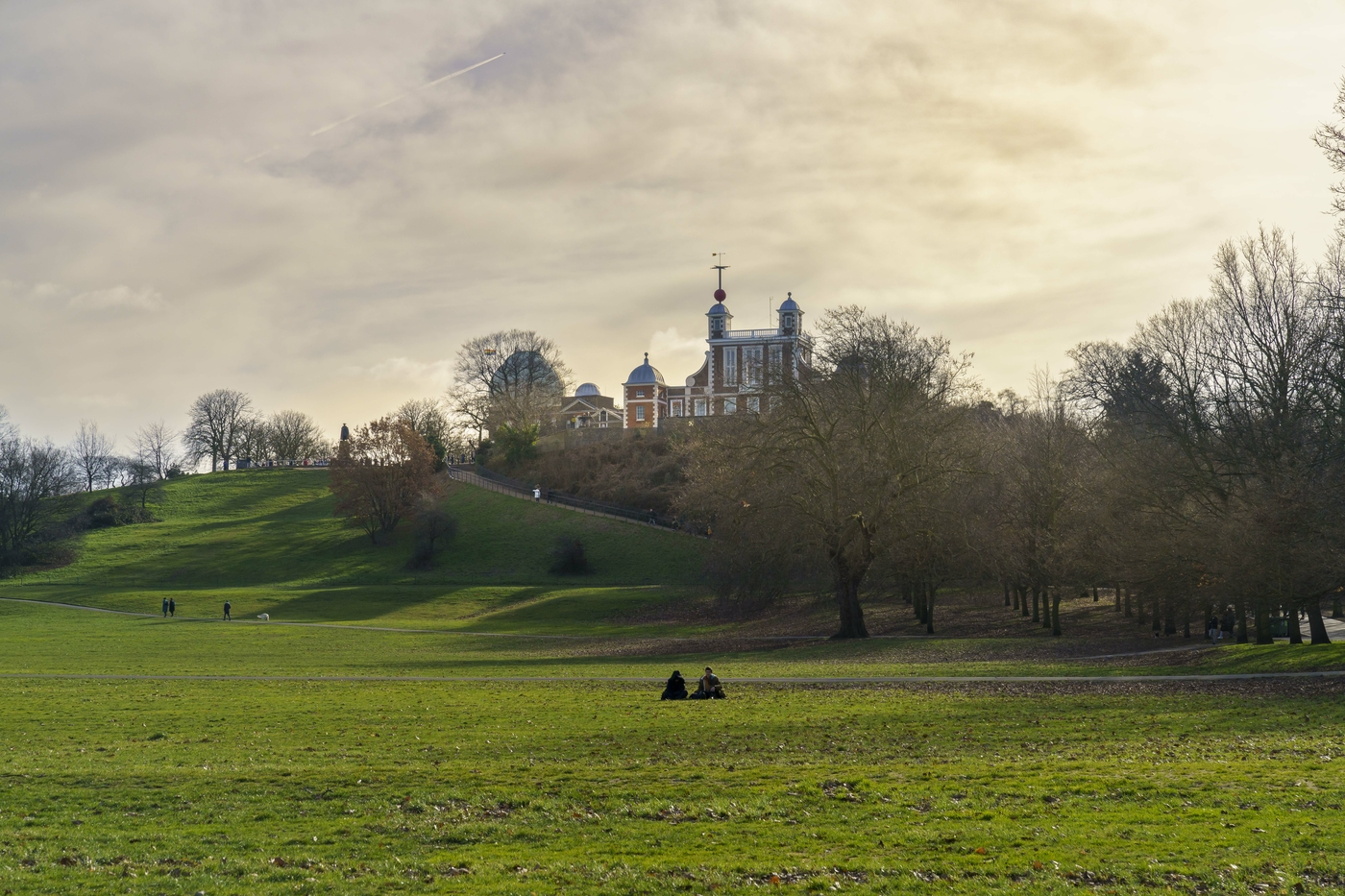
The Royal Observatory in Greenwich Park

The Royal Parks were originally used for recreation, mostly hunting, by the royal family of England. They are part of the hereditary possessions of The Crown, now managed by The Royal Parks, a charity which manages eight royal parks and certain other areas of parkland in London. The Royal Parks charity was created as a company limited by guarantee in March 2017, and officially launched in July 2017. Its chief executive is Andrew Scattergood.

The charity took over the main responsibilities of management from the Royal Parks Agency – a former executive agency of the Department for Culture, Media and Sport – and from the Royal Parks Foundation, which was a separate charity.

== Parks ==
With increasing urbanisation of London, some royal hunting or tenant lands were preserved as freely accessible open space and became public parks with the introduction of the Crown Lands Act 1851. There are today eight parks formally described by this name and they cover almost 2,000 hectares (4,900 acres) of land in Greater London.

The parks were used as hunting grounds for the royal family, often associated with royal residences or land formerly belonging to monasteries. In the 1500s, Henry VIII enclosed lands to the north of the Palace of Whitehall for what is now St James's Park and The Green Park. He also took the land that became Hyde Park and Kensington Gardens from Westminster Abbey. Over the years, there has been a gradual transition towards public accessibility for these areas. Hyde Park was opened to the public in 1673 by King Charles II.

The present parks are:

- Richmond Park 955 hectares (2,360 acres)
- Bushy Park 445 hectares (1,100 acres)
- The Regent's Park & Primrose Hill 166 hectares (410 acres)
- Hyde Park 140 hectares (350 acres)
- Kensington Gardens 107 hectares (260 acres)
- Greenwich Park 74 hectares (180 acres)
- St James's Park 23 hectares (57 acres)
- The Green Park 16 hectares (40 acres)

Five of these parks – the Regent's Park, Hyde Park, Kensington Gardens, the Green Park, and St James's Park – are situated in central London.

The parks are owned by the Crown, with responsibility for them resting with the Secretary of State for the Department for Culture, Media and Sport. The Royal Parks charity manages the parks on behalf of the government.

== Role ==
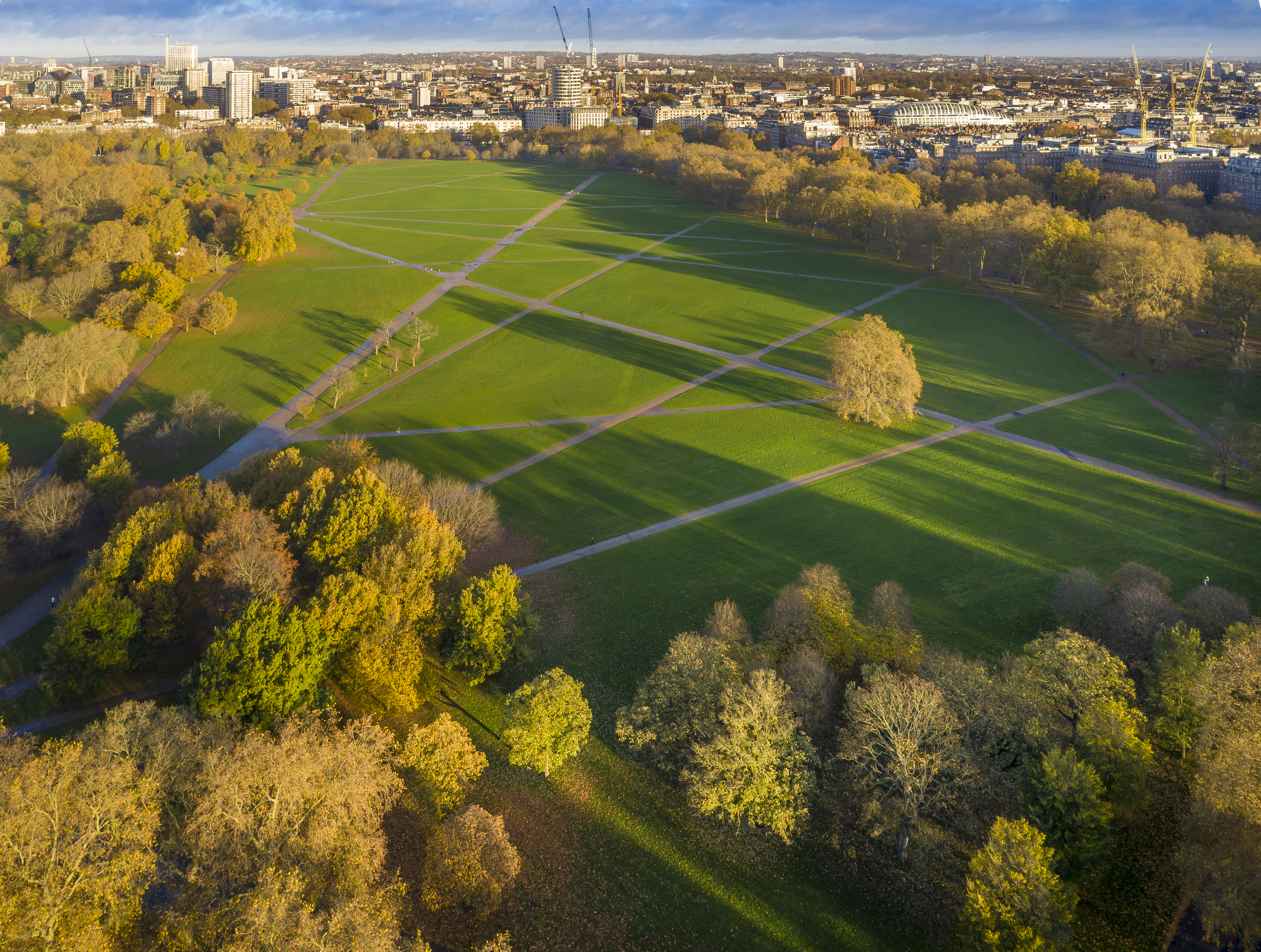
Aerial view of Hyde Park

The charity runs programmes of activities and events to encourage outdoor recreation and public access to these areas. It also allows third parties to run such activities within the grounds to further these objectives, but commercial activity is tightly controlled.

The Royal Parks charity regulates non-personal filming, audio recording, and photography through licences. It issues news permits for media coverage of breaking news in the parks, with holders required to comply with specific legislation:

- The Royal Parks and Other Open Spaces Regulations 1997
- Royal Parks and Other Open Spaces (Amendment) Regulations 2004

As well as the eight royal parks in its care, the charity also manages Brompton Cemetery and Victoria Tower Gardens. It manages 5,000 acres of historic parkland in London, and its responsibilities include the preservation of 170,000 trees, 21 lakes and ponds, 15 miles of riverbed, and a population of over 1,000 wild deer.

== Management ==
=== Policing ===
In relation to the Royal Parks in London, the Royal Parks Constabulary were replaced by the Royal Parks Operational Command Unit within the Metropolitan Police by the Serious Organised Crime and Police Act 2005.

In 2025, the Metropolitan Police announced that the Royal Parks police unit will be disbanded and the officers redistributed to neighbourhood policing teams.

=== General governance ===
In 2010, the then Mayor of London, Boris Johnson, proposed the devolution of control over the Royal Parks to the Greater London Authority. The government put forward proposals for this transfer later in the same year. While The Royal Parks expressed support for the plan, it was not ultimately implemented.

The parks were managed by the Royal Parks Agency (an executive agency of the Department for Culture, Media and Sport) until the agency joined with charity the Royal Parks Foundation to form a new charity – The Royal Parks – launched in July 2017.

Some funding for The Royal Parks comes from a central government grant (15%) and its own charitable fundraising (85%). The Royal Parks charity generates the majority of its income from commercial activities such as catering and staging public events, as well as through grants and individual donations.

The day-to-day management of each park and area is managed by a Park Manager, who receives support from a team of staff and contractors. Their responsibilities include overseeing the preservation of natural landscapes and maintaining heritage sites, roads, and other structures within and around the parks.

== Conservation ==
The Royal Parks charity declared a climate emergency in 2020. Its parks are carefully managed to protect wildlife and allow the natural environment to flourish. The charity describes them as “a huge resource of natural capital that we must conserve and enhance”. Often referred to as the “lungs of London”, the parks play an important role in the city's natural environment.

The charity launched the Help Nature Thrive programme in 2022 with the aim of enhancing sustainability and biodiversity within the capital. All parks adhere to a sustainable management plan, implementing various initiatives to safeguard the survival of natural habitats.

The Royal Parks charity is committed to maintaining the gardens in order to preserve the natural habitats for local wildlife. More recent plans have included a £5 million grant to transform Greenwich Park and a transformation of a former private plant nursery into a public memorial garden in The Regent’s Park.

In previous years, the charity has supported restoration projects for both Bushy Park and Richmond Park, addressing long-term concerns to protect the natural habitats in the face of climate change.

== Governance ==
The Royal Parks charity is led by a board of trustees, which decides how the charity is run, how it spends its money and ensures what it does is for the benefit of the parks and their visitors. The trustees are led by a chairman and are appointed for their skills and experience. Alongside some ex-officio roles, others are appointed by the Secretary of State for the Department for Culture, Media and Sport (DCMS) and the Greater London Authority (GLA). They are non-executive and unpaid.

The board is chaired by Linda Yueh.

The executive management team is responsible for the daily operations of The Royal Parks charity, and under the leadership of the chief executive, Andrew Scattergood, they propose the organisation's policies and strategies to the board of trustees. Additionally, the team manages a workforce of staff and volunteers.

== Legal position ==
The Royal Parks are owned by the Monarch in right of the Crown; however, under the Crown Lands Act 1851, statutory responsibility for the management and upkeep rests with the government. From 1993 until 2017, The Royal Parks Agency managed the parks on behalf of the Secretary of State.

In 2017, The Royal Parks Charity was created to manage the parks under a contract with the government. Appointments to the charity’s Board are made by the Secretary of State for Culture, Media and Sport, as well as the Mayor of London.

The parks are open to everyone, but those using the parks are expected to adhere to regulations issued under the Parks Regulations Acts 1872 – 1926. These regulations are deemed necessary for the proper management, maintenance, and protection of the estate. The Royal Parks and Other Open Spaces Regulations 1997 (as subsequently amended) remain extant.

== Discrimination/pay dispute over outsourced park attendants ==
Since 2014, Vinci Facilities has been contracted to maintain the Royal Parks, employing as cleaners/attendants mainly African migrants. Vinci had originally tendered separate bids cost for minimum wage staff and Living Wage staff – and its minimum wage bid was accepted, meaning that the approximately 50 cleaners/attendants were earning £8.21 an hour by 2019. Then, with several joining United Voices of the World union in pursuit of the London Living wage (£10.75) and going on strike in October 2019 with further strikes planned, the Royal Parks board agreed to fulfill their wage demands in December 2019, backdated to 1 November.

However, during the tendering process, Vinci and Royal Parks had also determined purely statutory entitlements in respect of overtime, on-call allowance, sick pay, annual leave, pensions, redundancy pay and maternity pay – and these inequalities with Royal Parks employees persisted. The two employers had allegedly repeatedly reviewed the general terms of Vinci's staff between 2014 and 2019, and Royal Parks had never opted to improve any part of their contracts.

It was announced in April 2020 that 15 claimants would bring a racial discrimination "landmark test case" against the Royal Parks charity. Barrister Changez Khan claimed that "the difference in pay until December last year and ongoing difference in other conditions have a 'disparate impact' on black and ethnic minority workers, as they are more likely to be outsourced agency workers".

On appeal, The Royal Parks was found not guilty.

== See also ==
- Parks and open spaces in London
- Walking in London
