= Royal Parks Constabulary =

UK police force

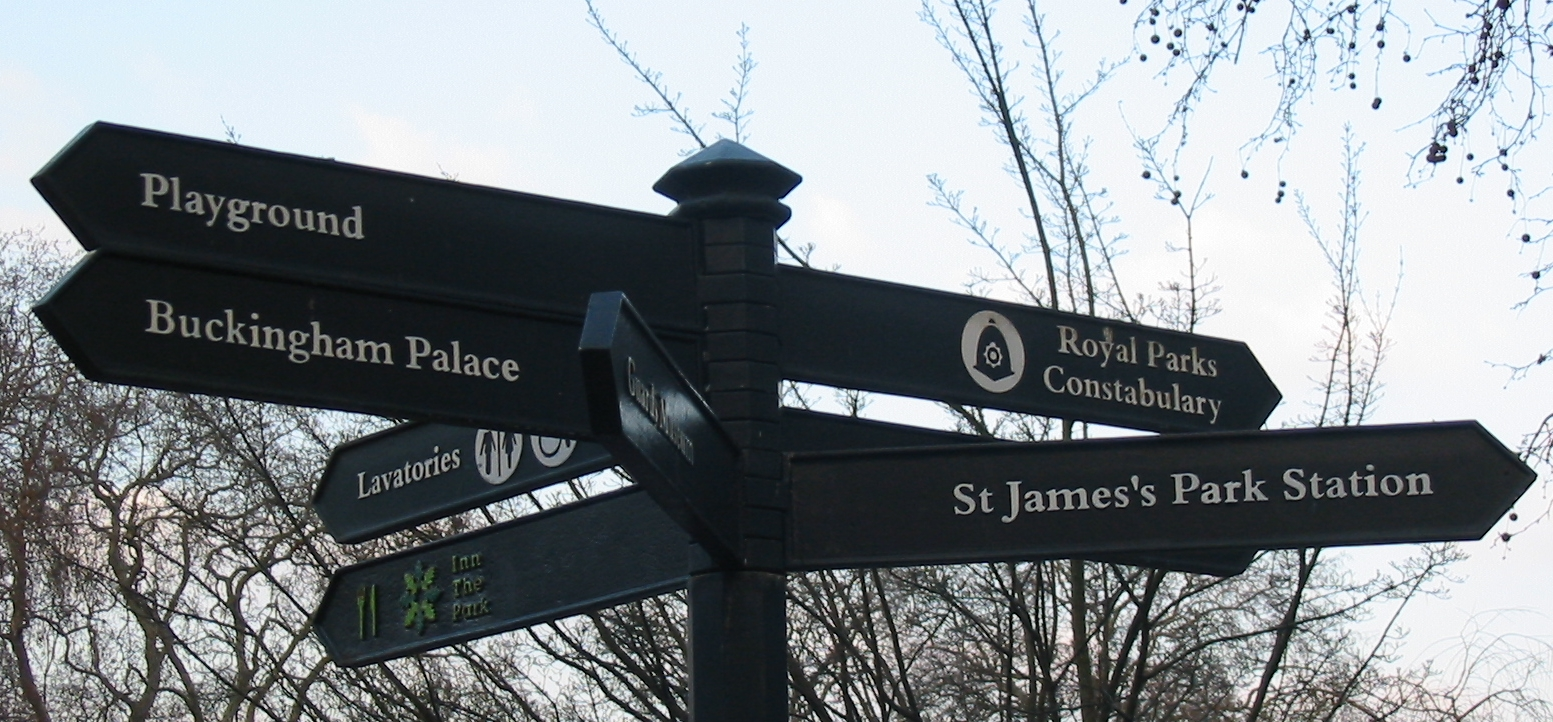
The Royal Parks Constabulary signposted in St. James's Park, London

The Royal Parks Constabulary (RPC) was the police force formerly responsible for the Royal Parks in London and a number of other locations in Greater London, England and Edinburgh, Scotland. Unlike most other police forces operating in England and Wales, the Royal Parks Constabulary did not report to the Home Office, but instead to the Department for Culture, Media and Sport, who provided funding for it through the Royal Parks Agency.

The force was created in 1872 as the Royal Parks Keepers; keepers were given full police powers within the parks. They were renamed the Royal Parks Constabulary in 1974. Before 1872, Hyde Park had its own constables who lived in some of the entrance lodges and worked out of the rooms inside Marble Arch. One of the last Inspectors of those constables was Samuel Parkes, who won the Victoria Cross in the Charge of the Light Brigade in 1854.

The constabulary worked towards maintaining the standards of Home Office police forces and all constables were trained at regional training centres, alongside their Home Office colleagues. Unlike council-run parks constabularies, constables of the RPC enjoyed full police powers in the parks under their control and had the power to instigate criminal proceedings for offences committed in the Royal Parks.

The force did not originally police Hyde Park. Instead, because of the potential for trouble at Speaker's Corner, Hyde Park was policed by the Metropolitan Police from 1867 until 1993. At the beginning of 1993 the policing of Hyde Park was handed over to the Royal Parks Constabulary.

On 1 April 2004, following a review of the Royal Parks Constabulary by Anthony Speed, the Royal Parks Operational Command Unit of the Metropolitan Police took on the responsibility of policing the Royal Parks in Greater London. The Serious Organised Crime and Police Act 2005 formally abolished the Royal Parks Constabulary in England. In Scotland, the powers were transferred to Historic Scotland (with security in Holyrood Park being provided by Historic Scotland's own Ranger Service and aided by Lothian and Borders Police).

Many of the London-based officers from the Royal Parks Constabulary transferred into the new Metropolitan Police Royal Parks Operational Command Unit (OCU) — the new OCU is funded in the same way, through the Royal Parks Agency, with its funding "ring-fenced" to prevent it being diverted to other Metropolitan Police areas and many others transferred into British Transport Police, as within London, Royal Parks Constabulary paid to share a control room (and subsequent radio channels), crime recording systems and human resources functions with BTP. However, it was announced in April 2025 that the Metropolitan Police planned to disband the OCU by 1 November 2025 due to a large funding gap.

The Royal Parks Constabulary's white vehicles originally had orange decals; these were later replaced with yellow decals.
