= List of United Kingdom uniformed services =

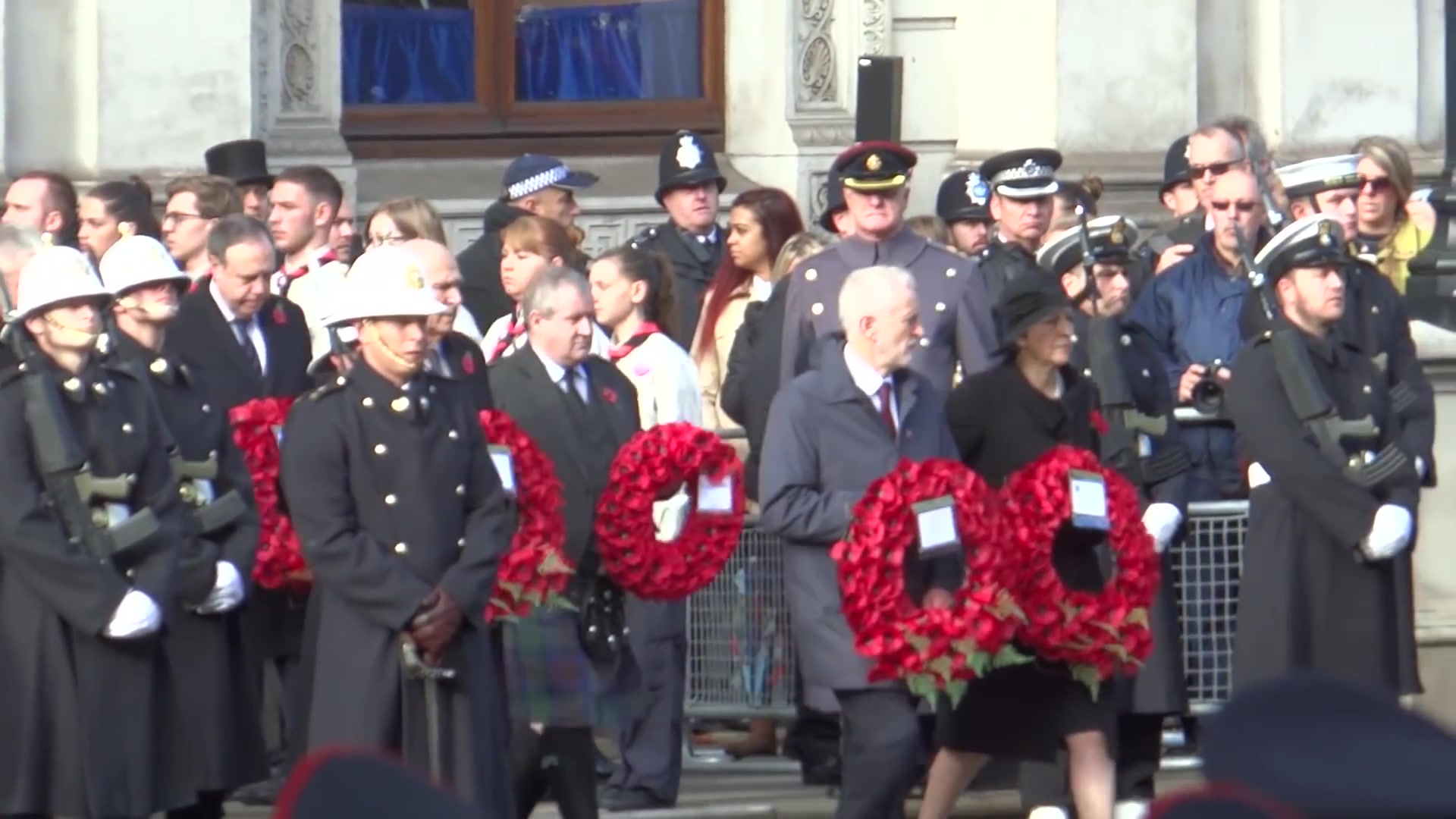
Members of multiple uniformed services attending the 2018 National Service of Remembrance, including the Royal Marines (wearing white pith helmets on the left), the British Army (wearing the grey trenchcoat and peaked cap with gold accents), the Royal Navy (on the right) and the Metropolitan Police (in the background, seen wearing various headwear).

This is a List of United Kingdom uniformed services which includes all uniformed public, emergency, armed and charity services in the United Kingdom and overseas territories.

The services listed here are national, regional, local, recognised, emergency, public-serving, military and educational and support services.

Members generally wear uniform, with distinct insignia so they can be identified in their distinct role. Rank structures are similar and similarities can be found between services. Some services may overlap and some may carry out similar duties.

== Nation-wide uniformed services ==
=== Armed forces ===
- His Majesty's Naval Service
  - Royal Navy
    - Royal Naval Reserve
  - Royal Marines
    - Royal Marines Reserve
  - Royal Fleet Auxiliary
  - Naval Careers Service
- British Army
- Royal Air Force
  - Royal Auxiliary Air Force

=== Civil uniformed services ===
- Merchant Navy (United Kingdom)
- Maritime Volunteer Service

=== Law enforcement ===
- Ministry of Defence Police
- Civil Nuclear Constabulary
- Border Force
- Immigration Enforcement
- HM Revenue and Customs
- National Crime Agency (with limited powers in Northern Ireland)
- Royal Military Police (part of the British Army)
- Royal Air Force Police (part of the Royal Air Force)
- Royal Navy Police (part of the Naval Service)
  - Royal Marines Police Troop
- Military Provost Staff (part of the British Army)
- Ministry of Defence Guard Service

=== Fire and rescue services ===
- Defence Fire and Rescue Service
- Various airport rescue and firefighting services

=== Healthcare and medical services ===
- British Red Cross
- First Aid Nursing Yeomanry

=== Rescue and support services ===
- British Red Cross
- His Majesty's Coastguard
- National Coastwatch Institution
- Royal National Lifeboat Institution
- Royal Voluntary Service
- Royal Air Force Mountain Rescue Service (part of the Royal Air Force)
- The Salvation Army
- British Cave Rescue Council

=== Uniformed youth organisations ===
- Community Cadet Forces
  - Army Cadet Force
  - Sea Cadet Corps
    - Royal Marines Cadets
  - Volunteer Cadet Corps
    - Royal Marines Volunteer Cadet Corps
  - Air Training Corps
- Combined Cadet Force
- The Scout Association
- The Baden-Powell Scouts' Association
- Girlguiding
- Boys' Brigade

== Uniformed services of England ==
=== Police and law enforcement ===
==== Territorial police forces ====
- Metropolitan Police Service
- City of London Police
- Avon and Somerset Police
- Bedfordshire Police
- Cambridgeshire Constabulary
- Cheshire Constabulary
- Cleveland Police
- Cumbria Constabulary
- Derbyshire Constabulary
- Devon and Cornwall Police
- Dorset Police
- Durham Constabulary
- Essex Police
- Gloucestershire Constabulary
- Hampshire and Isle of Wight Constabulary
- Hertfordshire Constabulary
- Humberside Police
- Kent Police
- Lancashire Constabulary
- Leicestershire Police
- Lincolnshire Police
- Greater Manchester Police
- West Mercia Police
- Merseyside Police
- West Midlands Police
- Norfolk Constabulary
- Northamptonshire Police
- Northumbria Police
- Nottinghamshire Police
- Staffordshire Police
- Suffolk Constabulary
- Surrey Police
- Sussex Police
- Thames Valley Police
- Warwickshire Police
- Wiltshire Police
- North Yorkshire Police
- South Yorkshire Police
- West Yorkshire Police

==== Parks police ====
- Epping Forest Keepers
- Hampstead Heath Constabulary
- Kew Constabulary
- Wandsworth Parks and Events Police
- Havering Parks Constabulary
- Royal Borough of Kensington and Chelsea Parks Police

==== Cathedral constables ====
- Canterbury Cathedral Close Constables
- Liverpool Cathedral Constables
- York Minster Police

==== Ports police ====
- Port of Bristol Police
- Port of Dover Police
- Falmouth Docks Police
- Port of Felixstowe Police
- Port of Portland Police
- Port of Liverpool Police
- Tees and Hartlepool Port Authority Harbour Police
- Port of Tilbury Police

==== Other police forces ====
- Border Force
- British Transport Police
- Cambridge University Constabulary
- Mersey Tunnels Police

==== Other enforcement agencies ====
- Military Provost Guard Service (part of the British Army)
- Driver and Vehicle Standards Agency
- Environment Agency fisheries enforcement officers
- Forestry Commission
- National Highways traffic officers
- Her Majesty's Prison Service
- Natural England wildlife inspectors
- Animal and Plant Health Agency wildlife inspectors

=== Fire and rescue services ===
- London Fire Brigade
- Avon Fire and Rescue Service
- Bedfordshire Fire and Rescue Service
- Royal Berkshire Fire and Rescue Service
- Buckinghamshire Fire and Rescue Service
- Cambridgeshire Fire and Rescue Service
- Cheshire Fire and Rescue Service
- Cleveland Fire Brigade
- Cornwall Fire and Rescue Service
- Cumbria Fire and Rescue Service
- Derbyshire Fire and Rescue Service
- Devon and Somerset Fire and Rescue Service
- Dorset and Wiltshire Fire and Rescue Service
- County Durham and Darlington Fire and Rescue Service
- Essex County Fire and Rescue Service
- Gloucestershire Fire and Rescue Service
- Hampshire & Isle of Wight Fire and Rescue Service
- Hereford and Worcester Fire and Rescue Service
- Hertfordshire Fire and Rescue Service
- Humberside Fire and Rescue Service
- Kent Fire and Rescue Service
- Lancashire Fire and Rescue Service
- Leicestershire Fire and Rescue Service
- Lincolnshire Fire and Rescue Service
- Greater Manchester Fire and Rescue Service
- Merseyside Fire and Rescue Service
- West Midlands Fire Service
- Norfolk Fire and Rescue Service
- Northamptonshire Fire and Rescue Service
- Northumberland Fire and Rescue Service
- Nottinghamshire Fire and Rescue Service
- Oxfordshire Fire and Rescue Service
- Isles of Scilly Fire and Rescue Service
- Shropshire Fire and Rescue Service
- Staffordshire Fire and Rescue Service
- Suffolk Fire and Rescue Service
- Surrey Fire and Rescue Service
- East Sussex Fire and Rescue Service
- West Sussex Fire and Rescue Service
- Tyne and Wear Fire and Rescue Service
- Warwickshire Fire and Rescue Service
- North Yorkshire Fire and Rescue Service
- South Yorkshire Fire and Rescue Service
- West Yorkshire Fire and Rescue Service

=== Healthcare and medical services ===
==== National Health Service ====
- London Ambulance Service NHS Trust
- East of England Ambulance Service NHS Trust
- East Midlands Ambulance Service NHS Trust
- West Midlands Ambulance Service University NHS Foundation Trust
- North East Ambulance Service NHS Foundation Trust
- North West Ambulance Service NHS Trust
- Isle of Wight Ambulance Service NHS Trust
- South Central Ambulance Service NHS Foundation Trust
- South East Coast Ambulance Service NHS Foundation Trust
- South Western Ambulance Service NHS Foundation Trust
- Yorkshire Ambulance Service NHS Trust
- NHS Blood and Transplant Blood Donation

==== Charity and voluntary aid services ====
- St John Ambulance England
- British Association for Immediate Care
- Hatzalah (London, Gateshead, and Manchester)

===== Air ambulances =====
- The Air Ambulance Service
- Magpas Air Ambulance
- London's Air Ambulance Charity
- Cornwall Air Ambulance Trust
- Devon Air Ambulance Trust
- Dorset and Somerset Air Ambulance
- East Anglian Air Ambulance
- Essex & Herts Air Ambulance Trust
- Great North Air Ambulance Service
- Hampshire & Isle of Wight Air Ambulance
- Air Ambulance Kent Surrey Sussex
- Lincolnshire & Nottinghamshire Air Ambulance
- Midlands Air Ambulance Charity
- North West Air Ambulance
- Thames Valley Air Ambulance
- Wiltshire Air Ambulance
- Yorkshire Air Ambulance

=== Rescue and support services ===
- Mountain Rescue England and Wales
- 4x4 Response
- Sky Watch Civil Air Patrol
- Severn Area Rescue Association
- Ryde Inshore Rescue Service
- Solent Rescue
- Southport Offshore Rescue Trust

==== Lifeboats ====
- Burnham Area Rescue Boat
- Caister Volunteer Lifeboat Service
- Freshwater Independent Lifeboat
- Gosport and Fareham Inshore Rescue
- Hope Cove Life Boat
- Mundesley Volunteer Inshore Lifeboat
- Runswick Bay Rescue Boat
- Sandown and Shanklin Independent Lifeboat Service
- Sea Palling Independent Lifeboat

=== Uniformed youth organisations ===
- Volunteer Police Cadets
- St John Ambulance England Cadets
- European Scout Federation

== Uniformed services of Wales ==
=== Law enforcement ===
- Dyfed-Powys Police (Heddlu Dyfed Powys)
- Gwent Police (Heddlu Gwent)
- North Wales Police (Heddlu Gogledd Cymru)
- South Wales Police (Heddlu De Cymru)
- British Transport Police (Heddlu Trafnidiaeth Prydeinig)
- Ministry of Defence Guard Service
- Driver and Vehicle Standards Agency (Asiantaeth Safonau Gyrru a Cherbydau)
- Welsh Government Traffic Officers (Swyddogion Traffig Llywodraeth Cymru)
- Military Provost Guard Service (part of the British Army)

=== Fire and rescue services ===
- Mid and West Wales Fire and Rescue Service (Gwasanaeth Tân ac Achub Canolbarth a Gorllewin Cymru)
- North Wales Fire and Rescue Service (Gwasanaeth Tân ac Achub Gogledd Cymru)
- South Wales Fire and Rescue Service (Gwasanaeth Tân ac Achub De Cymru)

=== Healthcare and medical services ===
==== National Health Service ====
- Welsh Ambulance Services University NHS Trust (Ymddiriedolaeth Brifysgol GIG Gwasanaethau Ambiwlans Cymru)
- Welsh Blood Service (Gwasanaeth Gwaed Cymru) (a division of Velindre University NHS Trust)
- Emergency Medical Retrieval and Transfer Service Cymru (Gwasanaeth Adalw a Throsglwyddo Meddygol Brys Cymru) (funded by the Welsh Government in cooperation with the Wales Air Ambulance Charitable Trust)

==== Charity and voluntary aid services ====
- St John Ambulance Cymru
- British Association for Immediate Care
- Blood Bikes Wales (Beiciau Gwaed Cymru)
- Wales Air Ambulance Charitable Trust (Ymddiriedolaeth Elusennol Ambiwlans Awyr Cymru)

=== Rescue and support services ===
- Mountain Rescue England and Wales
- 4x4 Response
- Severn Area Rescue Association

=== Uniformed youth organisations ===
- Volunteer Police Cadets (Cadetiaid Heddlu)
- St John Ambulance Cymru Cadets

== Uniformed services of Scotland ==
=== Law enforcement ===
- Police Scotland
- Scottish Prison Service
- British Transport Police
- Ministry of Defence Guard Service
- Scottish Environment Protection Agency
- Driver and Vehicle Standards Agency
- Animal and Plant Health Agency wildlife inspectors
- Scottish Government water baillifs
- Military Provost Guard Service (part of the British Army)

=== Fire and rescue services ===
- Scottish Fire and Rescue Service

=== Healthcare and medical services ===
==== National Health Service ====
- Scottish Ambulance Service (including the Scottish Air Ambulance)
- Scottish National Blood Transfusion Service

==== Charity and voluntary aid services ====
- St Andrew's First Aid
- British Association for Immediate Care Scotland
- Scotland's Charity Air Ambulance
- Highland PICT Team

=== Rescue and support services ===
- Mountain Rescue Committee of Scotland
- Glasgow Humane Society Lifeboat
- St Abbs Lifeboat

== Uniformed services of Northern Ireland ==
=== Law enforcement ===
- Police Service of Northern Ireland
- Belfast Harbour Police
- Belfast International Airport Constabulary
- Northern Ireland Prison Service
- Northern Ireland Security Guard Service
- Northern Ireland Environment Agency
- Forest Service Northern Ireland
- Driver and Vehicle Agency

=== Fire and rescue services ===
- Northern Ireland Fire and Rescue Service

=== Healthcare and medical services ===
==== National Health Service ====
- Northern Ireland Ambulance Service HSC Trust
- Northern Ireland Blood Transfusion Service

==== Charity and voluntary aid services ====
- St John Ambulance Northern Ireland
- British Association for Immediate Care Northern Ireland
- Air Ambulance Northern Ireland

=== Rescue and support services ===
- Irish Cave Rescue Organisation (shared with the Republic of Ireland)
- Community Rescue Service

== Defunct ==
Throughout history, many uniformed services have been formed, disbanded, and merged; below is a sample of some of the more notable or national defunct uniformed services.

=== Armed forces ===
- English Militia (1660–1707, became the British Militia)
- British Militia (1707–c.1820s)
- British Volunteer Corps (1794–1813)
- Militia (1852–1908, became the Special Reserve, 1921–1953)
- Volunteer Force (1859–1908, became the Territorial Force)
- Special Reserve (1908–1921)
- Territorial Force (1908–1921, became the Territorial Army)
- Women's Royal Naval Service (1917–1919, 1939–1993)
- Queen Mary's Army Auxiliary Corps (1917–1921)
- Women's Royal Air Force (1918–1920)
- Women's Auxiliary Air Force (1939–1949)
- Home Guard (1940–1944)
  - Auxiliary Units
- Auxiliary Territorial Service (1938–1949)
- Home Service Force (1982–1993)

=== Civil uniformed services ===
- Women's Land Army (1917–1919, 1939–1950)
- Mechanised Transport Corps (1939–1946)
- Air Transport Auxiliary (1940–1945)
- Civil Defence Service (1935–1945)
- Civil Defence Corps (1949–1968)
- Admiralty Yard Craft Service (Unknown–1976, merged into the Royal Maritime Auxiliary Service)
- Royal Maritime Auxiliary Service (1976–2008, privatised as Serco Marine Services)
- Admiralty Ferry Crew Service (1942–1963, merged into the Royal Naval Auxiliary Service)
- Royal Naval Minewatching Service (1952–1963, merged into the Royal Naval Auxiliary Service)
- Royal Naval Auxiliary Service (1963–1994)
- Women's Royal Voluntary Service (1938–Present, but ceased to be a Uniformed Service in 1998)

=== Law enforcement ===
- Air Force Department Constabulary (c.1920s–1971, merged into the Ministry of Defence Police)
- Army Department Constabulary (as above)
- Admiralty Constabulary (as above)
- Ministry of Civil Aviation Constabulary (1948–1966, became the BAA Constabulary)
- British Airports Authority Constabulary (1966–1974)
- Royal Parks Constabulary (1872–2004)
- HM Customs and Excise (1909–2005, merged into HM Revenue and Customs)
- UK Border Agency (2008–2013, became Border Force, UK Visas and Immigration, and Immigration Enforcement)
- Serious Organised Crime Agency (2006–2013, became the National Crime Agency)

=== Fire and rescue services ===
- Army Fire Service (1940–1990, merged into the Defence Fire Service)
- Ministry of Civil Aviation Aerodrome Fire Service (1946–1965, became the BAA Fire Service)
- National Fire Service (1941–1948)
- Auxiliary Fire Service (1938–1941, 1948–1968, associated with the Civil Defence Service and Corps)

=== Uniformed youth organisations ===
- Welbeck Defence Sixth Form College (1953–2021)
- Air Defence Cadet Corps (1938–1941, became the Air Training Corps)
- National Association of Training Corps for Girls
  - Girls Training Corps (1941–1964, merged into the Girls Venture Corps)
  - Girls Nautical Training Corps (1942–1980, merged into the Sea Cadet Corps)
  - Women's Junior Air Corps (1939–1964, merged into the Girls Venture Corps)
- Girls Venture Corps Air Cadets (1964–2023, some individual units continue as separate charities)

== See also ==
- British Armed Forces
- Law enforcement in the United Kingdom
