= Royal Naval Auxiliary Service =

Civilian volunteer service associated with the British Royal Navy

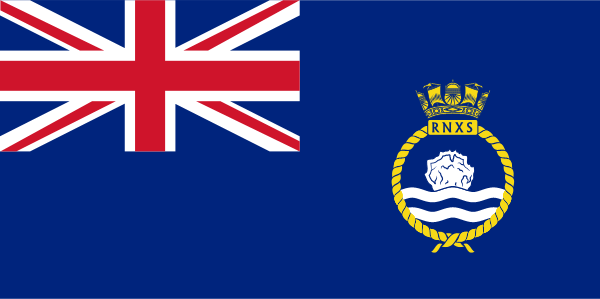
Ensign of the Royal Naval Auxiliary Service.

The Royal Naval Auxiliary Service (RNXS) was a uniformed, unarmed, civilian volunteer service, administered and trained by the Royal Navy to operate in the ports and anchorages of the United Kingdom in an emergency. It maintained training units, and vessels at most major ports in the UK. and was formed in 1963 from the amalgamation of the Royal Naval Mine-watching Service (RNMWS) and Admiralty Ferry Crew Association in response to the perceived nuclear threat to British ports. The service was disbanded on 31 March 1994 due to Ministry of Defence (MOD) cuts. Most vessels from its fleet were transferred to the Royal Navy or sold, with the exception of XSV Loyal Volunteer, which was struck by a ro-ro ferry while berthed in Ipswich Harbour and was later scrapped.

The abbreviated title of RNXS was used, as RNAS was already in use by Royal Naval Air Stations.

== Role ==
The service was divided into 'Afloat' and 'Ashore' sections, The 'Afloat' personnel manned the service's dedicated ships and the 'Ashore' personnel manned the Port Headquarters (PHQ) which were positioned around the United Kingdom. The 'Afloat' section contained engineers, seamen and communications personnel, while the 'Ashore' section consisted of communications and plotting staff, later amalgamated into an 'Operations' section. There was an element of "cross-fertilization" whereby some people of the 'Afloat' section worked in PHQs as communicators, drivers and security staff and some of the 'Ashore' section worked afloat as engineers, seamen, communicators and cooks.

RNXS personnel, known as auxiliarymen regardless of gender, were to be readily available to assist in the tasks of evacuating major ports and dispatching larger and faster merchant vessels overseas in case of an attack on the UK. Any remaining ships were to be dispersed to safe anchorages along the coasts or at nearby islands. Formation, planning and sailing of convoys were tasks undertaken in the PHQs by RNXS staff working within overall dedicated RNR control during exercises. The communications personnel operated the Communications Centre connected via teleprinter and, latterly computer, to all UK MOD Communications Nodes and, unassisted, performed these tasks solely within the RNXS structure on behalf of the overall PHQ Command and Naval Officer In Command (NOIC).

For some of these purposes, the RNXS operated a small fleet of inshore vessels. Initially, the vessels were 45-foot (14 m) and 61.5-foot (18.7 m) Motor Fishing Vessels. These smaller boats were soon replaced by ten inshore minesweepers (Ham class). RNXS vessel names were prefixed 'XSV' for Auxiliary Service Vessel. The minesweepers were de-armed and converted to enable larger training crews to be embarked. The 20 mm Oerlikon cannon or 40 mm Bofors guns were removed but the mounts were kept. Over time, the minesweepers were replaced by fleet tenders, the Loyal class. Most of this class of ships' names were prefixed 'Loyal' apart from XSV Supporter, whose home port was Belfast, and, given Irish political tensions at the time, the prefix "Loyal" was dropped. The RNXS operated eleven purpose-built fleet tenders and various other small craft. In 1990, a specific threat of port attack by subversive and/or Special Forces was identified and to help to counter this threat, the RNXS received four of P2000 fast patrol craft from the fourteen built for the Royal Navy These P2000s are still in service, as commissioned warships at University Royal Naval Units.

The sailing of merchantmen both overseas and coastal sailings involved setting up assembly anchorages where ships might be formed into convoys, a naval escort or surveillance for information on routing, intelligence, and communications. Auxiliarymen were required at assembly anchorage control to assist in these tasks.

Originally, the Royal Naval Mine-watching Service (RNMWS) had two main tasks in war.

First, to observe, plot and report the fall of mines laid by enemy aircraft in port approaches and main waterways. Second, to provide the basic local organisation for naval officers in charge at strategic ports around the UK in war.

These tasks were not new, indeed they had been performed by naval and merchant naval personnel throughout the past centuries. The nuclear threat, however, had cut the time available to the Royal Navy, and the Merchant Navy had to be developed or adapted to cope. Therefore, the RNXS was formed.

In 1963 the Royal Mine-watching Service assumed a new role and name with responsibilities to provide staff to support the Navy in the various port headquarters around the UK that would be set up in a national emergency or war.

== Royal warrant ==
A royal warrant was granted changing its name from the "Royal Naval Mine-watching Service" to the "Royal Naval Auxiliary Service" in 1962, to reflect these new functions.

One of the Royal Navy's major tasks is the protection of shipping, and the RNXS played a non-combatant, but important, role in support of its parent Navy by manning port headquarters in major ports and anchorages around the UK. they were to be available to assist in the tasks of evacuating major ports, and dispatching larger and faster merchant vessels overseas in case of an attack on the UK. Any remaining ships were to be dispatched to safe anchorages along the coasts or at nearby islands.

Because merchant vessels would be travelling overseas in time of war, further tasks involved the setting up assembly anchorages, where ships could be formed into convoys ready for a naval escort. RNXS personnel were required at these assembly anchorages to assist in routing of vessels, intelligence, and communications both ashore and afloat. The service also provided craft and crews to support the Navy in these ports and anchorages. These craft ranged from ex inshore minesweepers, fleet tenders (Loyal class) to fast patrol boats (P2000 or the shortened P20), permanently on loan to the service. The craft were normally based in Naval Dockyards for the necessary maintenance and technical support from the Royal Maritime Auxiliary service but they were manned entirely by the RNXS crew.

These craft were at sea most weekends for practical training, and also took part in national and NATO military exercises, as well as local and out-of-area training cruises. The craft took part in fleet reviews; and have been used in the clearance of oil pollution; search and rescue and many other tasks.

== The Ensign of Royal Naval Auxiliary Service ==
The Ensign was originally created in 1954 for the Royal Naval Mine-watching Service, but when the service was amalgamated with the Admiralty Ferry Crews Association, to become the Royal Naval Auxiliary Service (RNXS) in 1963, the flag inscription was altered to reflect the name change.

== Command structure ==
The RNXS command structure was divided in to geographical areas within the UK

- Scotland, Northern Ireland & N.E England Training Units

Grimsby, Thorne, Hull, Stockton & Tees-port, Hartlepool, Sunderland, Newcastle, Blyth, Leith, Rosyth, Dundee, Aberdeen, Elgin, Inverness, Invergordon, Thurso, Kirkwall, Greenock & Clyde port, Ayr, Bangor, Belfast.

RAF Pitreavie Castle near Dunfermline, Fife, was the Headquarters of the Scotland, Northern Ireland & N.E England, RNXS Group, consisting of both permanent and volunteer staff

- Portsmouth Training Units *

Bexhill, Chatham, Chelmsford, Dover, Felixstowe. Gravesend, Greenwich, Harwich, Isle of Wight, Ipswich, London, Margate, Poole, Portland, Portsmouth, Sheerness, Shoreham Southampton, Southend, Great Yarmouth, Littlehampton.

- Plymouth Training Units *

Exeter, Guernsey, Jersey, Torbay (based in Brixham), Plymouth, Fowley, Falmouth, Penzance, Barnstaple, Bristol, Gloucester, Sully, Swansea, Pembroke Dock, Holyhead, Menai Bridge, Conwy, Liverpool, Inskip.

== RNXS crew ==
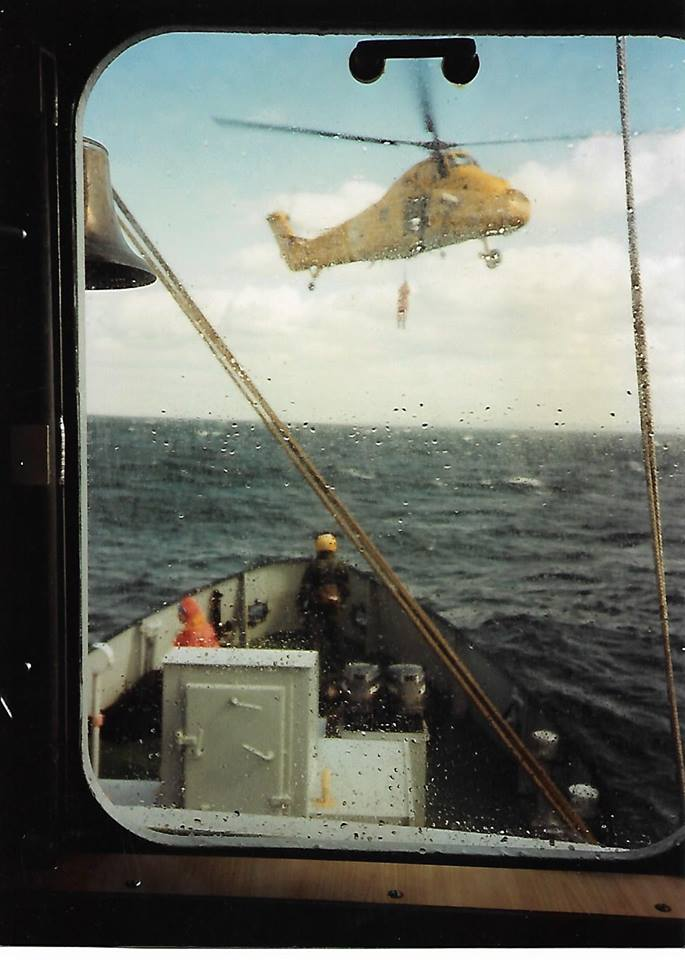
RNXS crew training with Air Sea Rescue Forth area

The RNXS accepted women among its crews before the Royal Navy did. The first female skipper was Denise St Aubyn Hubbard in 1978.

The men and women of the RNXS, or auxiliary-men as they were known, were between the ages of 21 and 60 and came from various backgrounds as civilians or prior service personnel.

Members undertook weekly classroom training, in their chosen departments, Engineering, Seamanship, Communications, and Operations. ashore and afloat, and worked towards qualifications, members also took part in extended formal training with the Navy

The RNXS had a pleasant family flavour and in many units were husbands and wives, sons and daughters training together for the job best suited to former experience and physical abilities.

Captains of the RNXS to 1987
Service dates	Officer
November 1963–December 1966	J.A. Murray
December 1966–January 1970	D.R. Johnston
January 1970–February 1973	D.J. Farquharson
February 1973–March 1976	P.S. Hicks-Beach
March 1976–August 1979	G.J.M. Andrewes
August 1979–November 1982	P.R.D. Kimm
November 1982–November 1984	M.R.Hare
November 1984–1987	J.R. Griffiths

James Erskine, Earl of Mar and Kellie was a member of the RNXS in the 1980s

Those who served in the RNXS were volunteer reservists and are therefore veterans of HM Armed Forces and are eligible to receive a HM Armed Forces Veteran card and a Veterans Badge from the UK Ministry of Defence, upon application.

In 1990 the RNXS had a personnel of 3,200.

The day after the Royal Naval Auxiliary Service was disbanded on 31 March 1994, its members formed the Maritime Volunteer Service (MVS)

== Vessels ==
=== Ham-class inshore minesweepers ===
Of the 93 Ham-class minesweepers built in the 1950s for the RN, and commissioned in 1956 (none of which saw active service) ten were later allocated in 1964 to the newly formed RNXS:

Name	Call sign	Pennant No	Completed	Builders	Joined RNXS	Disposal
Birdham		M.2785	5 March 1957	J.Taylor	1964	May 1980 - Arrived Great Wakering, Essex for Breaking
Odiham		M.2783	27 July 1956	Vospers	1964	1978 - on disposal list. May 1980 sold to Sutton & Smith, Great Wakering, Essex
Pagham		M.2716	22 March 1956	Jones, Buckie	1964	to 1982, RNR Tender
Portisham	GTDG	M.2781	26 March 1956	Dorset Yacht	1964	to 1983 at HMS Vernon, Portsmouth
Puttenham		M.2784	9 May 1958	Thorneycroft	1964	to 1978 at Plymouth
Saxlingham		M.2727	29 January 1957	Berthon Boat	1964	to 1965. Approved to scrap 1966. 2 May 1968 sold to Ross & Cromarty CC for Lewis Sea School
Shipham	MTMW	M.2726	3 February 1956	Brooke Marine	1964	to 11 March 1985 returned to Portsmouth with stern damage due to being swept onto a low lying LASH Lighter.
Shrivenham		M.2728	11 August 1956	Bolson	1964	to 1965. For disposal in 1966. Sold to Port of London Authority on 21 February 1969.
Thakeham	GTJC	M.2733	15 November 1957	Fairlee Yacht	1964	to 1978. 1979 for disposal
Tongham		M.2735	18 June 1957	J.Miller	1964	to 1978, also PAS. 1979 for disposal

=== Loyal-class fleet tenders ===
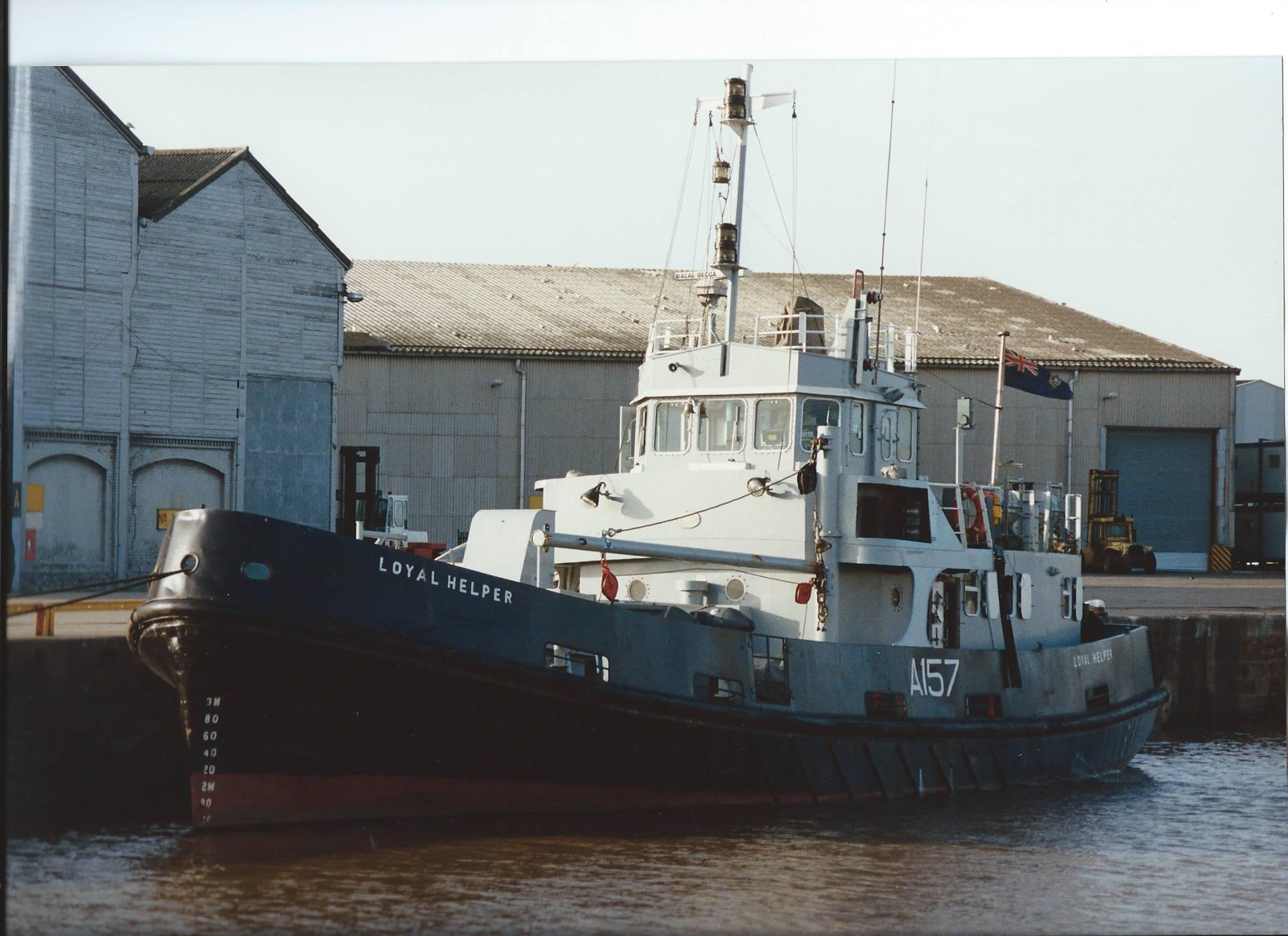
Loyal Helper

The Loyal-class fleet tenders were purpose built in the late seventies by Richard Dunston of Thorn, South Yorkshire, as training vessels for the RNXS, they were based on a proven MOD/RMAS design for supply tenders. In the RNXS version the hold was converted at the build stage for extra accommodation for RNXS crew. They had interior hatches down into the converted holds, now fitted with bunks and living quarters. Externally, they are very similar to the Clovelly-class supply fleet tenders.

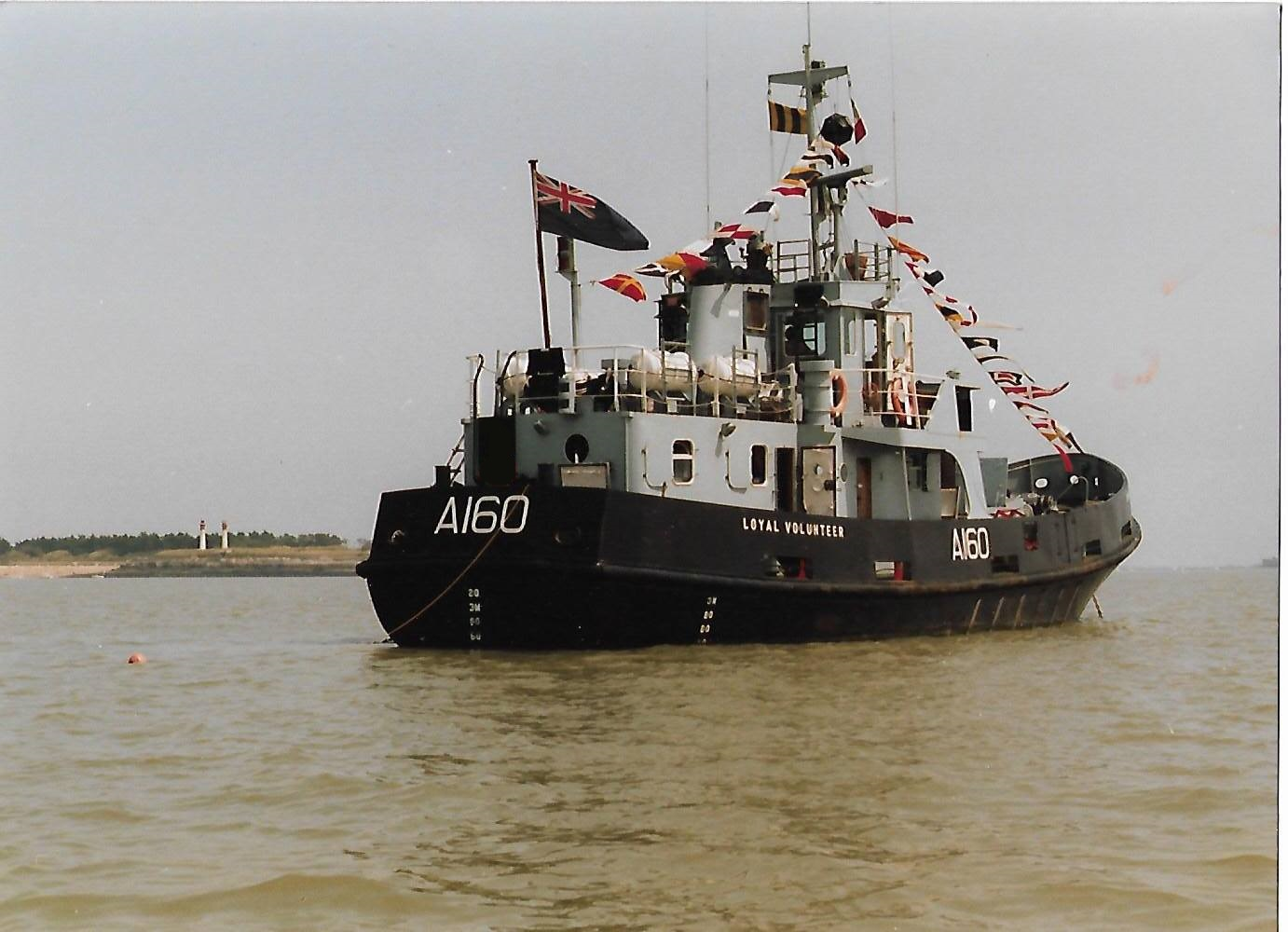
Loyal Volunteer dressed for visit to Rochfort, Brittany.

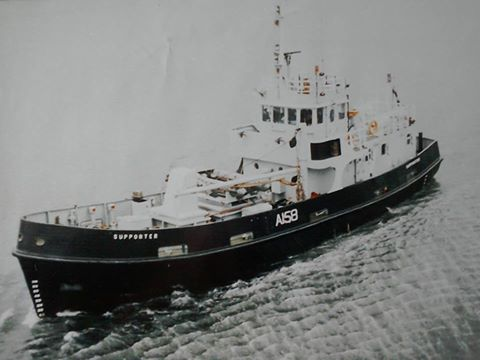
XSV Supporter

Name	Pennant number	Notes
Loyal Helper	A157	Transferred to RMAS
Supporter	A158	Disposition unknown
Loyal Watcher	A159	Transferred to the Royal Navy and commissioned as HMS Loyal Watcher, allocated to Cambridge URNU. Decommissioned 1998.
Loyal Volunteer (Note: Because of its name Loyal Volunteer was generally considered the flagship of the RNXS)	A160	Sold and renamed PENELOPE III
Loyal Mediator	A161	Diving support vessel
Loyal Moderator	A220	Disposition unknown
Loyal Factor	A382	Transferred to HMS Vigilant
Loyal Governor	A510	Transferred to RMAS as RMAS Alert
Loyal Chancellor	A1770	Transferred to the Royal Navy and commissioned as HMS Loyal Chancellor, allocated to Oxford URNU. Decommissioned 1998 and sold. Current name is MV Headcorn and is owned by North West Marine.
Loyal Proctor	A1771	Disposition unknown

=== Archer class (P2000 or "P20") ===
Royal Navy
Name	Pennant number	Builder	Commissioned	Attached to	Status
Example (ex-XSV Example)	P165 (ex-A153)	Watercraft Marine	1985	Northumbrian URNU	In active service
Explorer (ex-XSV Explorer)	P164(ex-A154)	Watercraft Marine	1986	Yorkshire URNU	In active service
Express (ex-XSV Express)	P163 (ex-A163)	Vosper Thornycroft	1988	Wales URNU	In active service
Exploit (ex-XSV Exploit)	P167 (ex-A167)	Vosper Thornycroft	1988	Birmingham URNU	In active service

Following the disbandment of the RNXS, the Loyal-class fleet tenders and the P2000 were sold or reassigned within the Royal Navy.

== Disbandment ==
On 18 October 1993 Malcolm Rifkind (Secretary of State For Defence 1992–1995) announced in the House of Commons that proposals set out in June regarding the future of the Royal Naval Auxiliary Service and Royal Auxiliary Air Force had been confirmed, and as no role could be found for the RNXS, they would be disbanded the following year.

On 18 February 1994 it was confirmed in the House of Commons as part of that same review that there was no continuing defence role for the Royal Naval Auxiliary Service, and after a properly managed rundown the RNXS would disband from 31 March 1994.

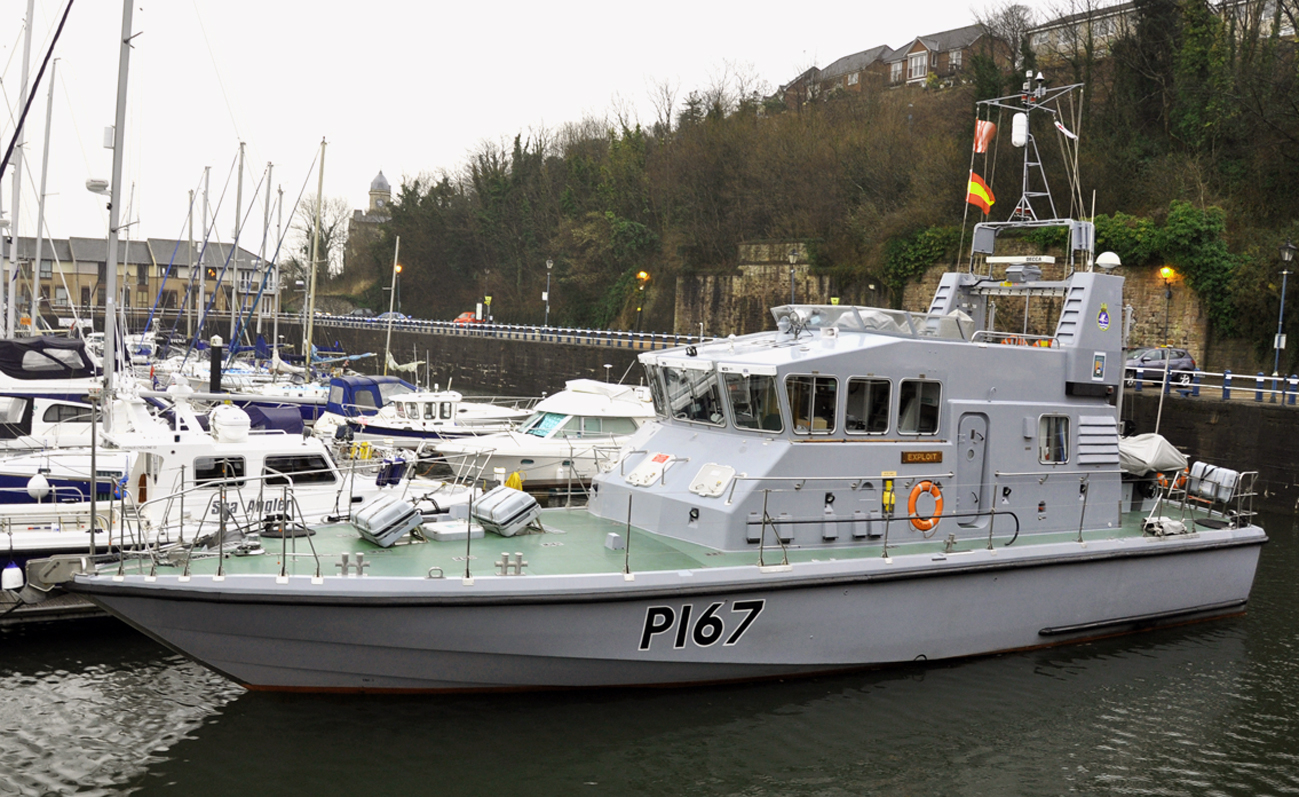
HMS Exploit originally XSV Exploit attached to the RNXS

A serious machinery space fire occurred on XSV Exploit approximately 30 miles of Lundy island, at 0645 19 March 1994, as she was being transferred to RN Portsmouth from Greenock as part of the managed run down of the service by RNXS crew. The Padstow lifeboat and the RAF SAR helicopter from Chivenor, were scrambled, and a tanker en route to Milford Haven was diverted to help, but they were not needed. If not for the coolness, professionalism, and bravery of the RNXS skipper Area Officer K Warner (Thorne unit), Charge Engineer Area Officer G Swan (Hartlepool unit), and Mate, J Smith (Rosyth unit), who entered the compartment three times in breathing masks when the Halon drenching system failed, to fight the fire with fire extinguishers, the ship would have been lost. The fire was later attributed to a major mechanical failure of the starboard main engine, resulting in a large hole in the sump casing. The fire spread quickly to the air ducts, igniting various rubber coolant pipes causing thick acrid, toxic smoke.

The mood in the service was further compounded with the loss of Loyal Volunteer, in Ipswich harbour later that year, and was seen as a sad end to a faithful vessel, and Aux Lt Cdr R.A Hare noted, "That this should be the fate of Loyal Volunteer, was not without its significance".

Not all of the members of the RNXS were lost for good when the RNXS disbanded. Some 2,000 former members of the RNR and RNXS formed the Maritime Volunteer Service, a civilian but uniformed organisation, as a national maritime training organisation, with charitable status. Designed to perpetuate maritime skills, in order to continue and develop those skills it has taken over and expanded many RNXS roles. Four years after its formation in 1994, the Maritime Volunteer Service was officially recognised by the Royal Navy. The decision was announced by Dr John Reid, the Armed Forces Minister in 1998. Prince Michael of Kent is the organisation's Royal Patron.

== See also ==
- Royal Naval Reserve (RNR)
- Maritime Volunteer Service (MVS)
