= Admiralty Ferry Crew Association =

Civilian Organisation

The Admiralty Ferry Crew Service was a civilian organisation formed during World War Two as part of the auxiliary forces of the British Naval Service.

The Admiralty requisitioned large numbers of small craft of different types to assist the naval war effort including trawlers, launches, fleet tenders and motor fishing vessels. Other craft were built to order. In 1942 Lt/Comdr. C.D. Barber, under the direction of Admiral Sir Lionel Preston, K.C.B, Director of the Small Vessels Pool, began enlisting experienced sailors, engineers and others who could not otherwise be accepted for war service, including some volunteers over 70. These men formed crews of six or eight, collected craft from shipyards and delivered them to naval bases around the United Kingdom. Direct voyages further afield were also undertaken, including to Iceland, the Faroes and Malta, while vessels destined for the Far East were delivered to ports such as Glasgow or Liverpool for onward transport. The Service numbered roughly 1,600 personnel and moved approximately 1,020 vessels.

At the end of the war, members formed the Admiralty Ferry Crew Association, to hold reunion dinners. The Association was encouraged by the Admiralty to maintain a list of experienced sailors, engineers and other crew who could be of use in an emergency. In 1963 the Association was amalgamated with the Royal Naval Minewatching Service to form the Royal Naval Auxiliary Service. The Association membership was reclassified as List III of the new service, though this separate element was disbanded in 1971. The RNXS was itself disbanded in 1994. The Maritime Volunteer Service, a maritime skills and training charity, was formed in the same year by former members of the RNXS and others.
