= SS Zealandic =

At least two ships have been named SS Zealandic:

- SS Zealandic (1911) was an ocean liner launched for the White Star Line in 1911, renamed Mamillius after 1926, Mamari III in 1936 and wrecked and sunk in 1941.
- SS Zealandic (1928) was a merchant ship launched in 1928 for Shaw, Savill and Albion Line and sunk by a German submarine in 1941.

== See also ==
- MV Zealandic, a passenger-cargo ship launched in 1964 for Shaw, Savill and Albion Line, renamed Port Launay in 1980, Khalij Crystal in 1981, and scrapped in 1984.
- SS Zeeland
