= Clovelly-class fleet tender =

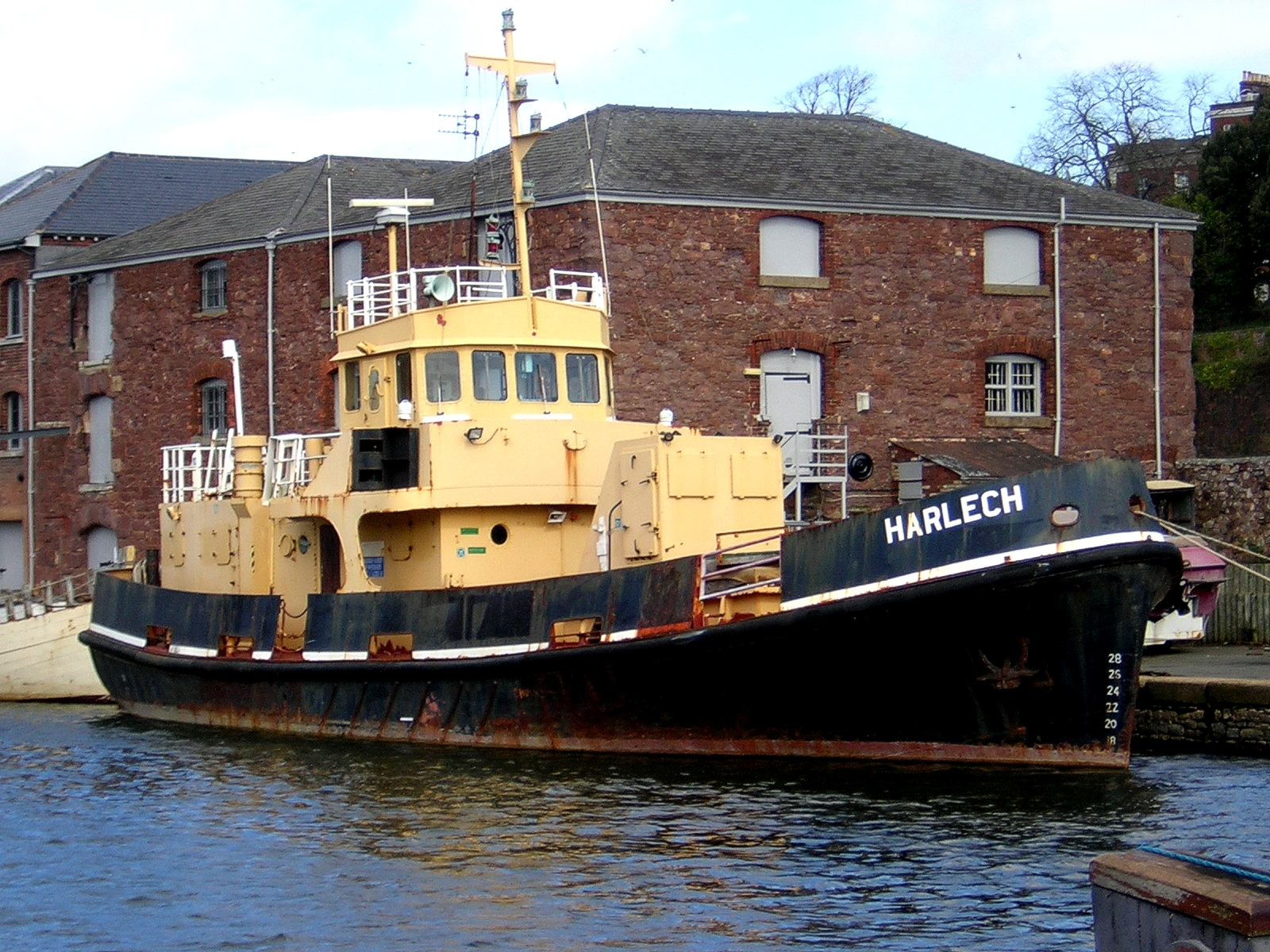
- RMAS Harlech

Class overview
- Builders: James W. Cook & Company, Ltd., Wivenhoe; J.S. Doig Ltd., Grimsby; Richard Dunston (Hessle) Ltd., Hessle, East Yorkshire; Gregson Ltd., Blyth; C.D. Holmes & Co., Beverley, East Yorkshire; John Lewis & Sons, Ltd., Aberdeen; Issac Plimbott & Sons, Northwich
- Operators: Royal Maritime Auxiliary Service; Royal Navy
- Built: 1967–1982
- In commission: 1972–2008
- Completed: 32

General characteristics
- Type: Fleet tender
- Displacement: 126 long tons (128 t)
- Length: 79 ft (24 m)
- Beam: 21 ft (6.4 m)
- Height: Mast up 36 ft (11 m); Mast down 22 ft (6.7 m)
- Draught: Normal trim 7.5 ft (2.3 m)
- Depth: 10 ft (3.0 m)
- Installed power: Single Lister Blackstone 4 cylinder diesel 320 hp (240 kW)
- Speed: 10.5 knots (19.4 km/h; 12.1 mph)
- Crew: 7

The Clovelly-class fleet tenders, also known as the Cartmel class, are a class of Royal Maritime Auxiliary Service boats built between 1967 and 1982. The class was named after villages and small towns in Great Britain. Six of the class, Clovelly, Ilchester, Instow, Invergordon, Ironbridge and Ixworth were equipped to act as diving tenders. Lydford was originally commissioned as A510 Loyal Governor, then renamed P252 Alert for service in Ulster until 1986.

== Ships in class ==
Name	Pennant number	In commission	Builder
Cartmel	A350	1967–1993	Plimbott
Cawsand	A351	1968–1984	Plimbott
Clovelly	A389	1970-1994	Plimbott
Criccieth	A391	1970–1992	Plimbott
Cricklade	A381	1970–1996	Holmes
Cromarty	A488	1970–1994	Lewis
Denmead	A363	1969–1996	Holmes
Dornoch	A490	1970–1997	Lewis
Dunster	A393	1969–2000	Dunston
Elkstone	A353	1970–1999	Cook
Elsing	A277	1970–1995	Cook
Epworth	A355	1969–1999	Cook
Ettrick	A274	1970–1995	Cook
Felsted	A348	1970–1997	Dunston
Fintry	A394	1970–1997	Lewis
Fotherby	A341	1969–1993	Dunston
Froxfield	A354	1970–1994	Dunston
Fulbeck	A365	1972–	Holmes
Glencoe	A392	1970–1992	Plimbott
Grasmere	A402	1970—	Lewis
Hambledon	A1769	1972–2001	Dunston
Harlech	A1768	1972–2001	Dunston
Headcorn	A1766	1971–2001	Dunston
Hever	A1767	1971–2002	Dunston
Holmwood	A1772	1972–1999	Dunston
Horning	A1773	1972–2001	Dunston
Ilchester	A308	1974–2003	Gregson
Instow	A309	1974–2003	Gregson
Invergordon	A311	1974–1978	Gregson
Ironbridge	A311	1978–	Gregson
Ixworth	A318	1974—2004	Gregson
Lamlash	A208	1973—2001	Dunston
Lechlade	A211	1972–2001	Dunston
Llandovery	A207	1973–1996	Dunston
Lydford	A251	1975–1996	Plimbott
Meon	A87	1981–2008	Dunston
Melton	A83	1981–2008	Dunston
Menai	A84	1981–2008	Dunston
Milford	A91	1982–2001	Dunston
