= Defence Fire and Rescue Service =

Fire and rescue service protecting British Armed Forces

Defence and Fire Rescue Service
- DFR / DFRS

Operational area
- Country: United Kingdom
- Address: Andover, Hampshire

Agency overview
- Established: 1991
- Motto: Preventing, Protecting, Responding

Website
- government page on DFR

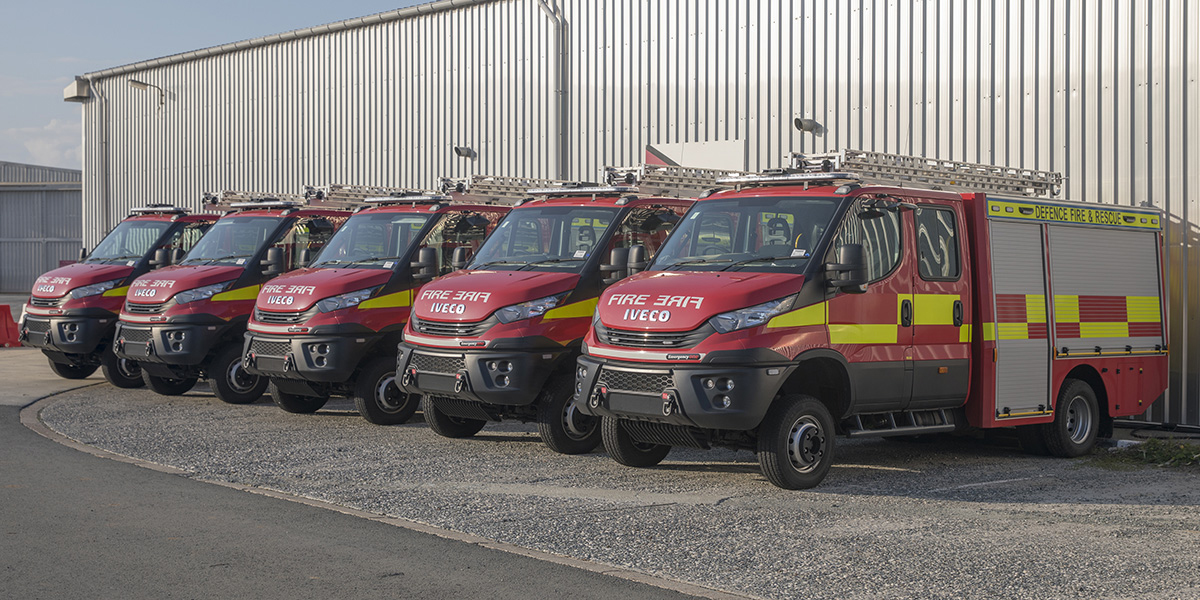
Brand new Iveco fire trucks, delivered to RAF Akrotiri in 2019

The Defence Fire and Rescue Service (DFRS) is the primary firefighting and rescue service protecting British defence estates and property. Along with the Royal Air Force Rescue and Firefighting Service, it forms the Ministry of Defence Fire Services. As of February 2021, the takeover of DFRS by private contractor Capita continues.

== History ==
The Ministry of Defence Fire Service was formed on 1 April 1991 by the amalgamation of the Navy Department Fire Prevention Service, Army Department Fire Service, Air Force Department Fire Service and Procurement Executive Fire Service. It later became part of a similarly named umbrella body, the Ministry of Defence Fire Services, which also included the RAF Firefighting and Rescue Service, a military organisation which protected mainly RAF airfields and runways.

== Privatisation ==
In July 2019, it was announced by the Ministry of Defence that Capita had won an outsourcing contract to manage the operations at 53 sites across the UK, Cyprus and the Falkland Islands. Part of the 12-year £525 million contract included the construction and management of an improved training facility for Defence firefighters at the Fire Service College in Gloucestershire, which has been owned by Capita since 2013.

As of February 2021, around 600 DFRS personnel have transferred into Capita Fire and Rescue, and improvements at the Fire Service College have been completed. In addition, 50 new vehicles including Oshkosh High Reach Extendable Turret (HRET) Strikers and Angloco Multi-Purpose Response Vehicles (MPRVs) have been delivered to 11 sites.

== Organisation ==
The Defence Fire and Rescue Service is a civilian organisation, however the term 'Defence Fire' may be used colloquially to include military and civilian firefighting activities. According to the gov.uk website, the DFR staff include:

Military

- Royal Air Force Trade Group 8 firefighter
- Royal Navy aircraft handler

Civilian

- Defence Fire and Rescue Service
- locally employed civilian and contractor staff.

As DFR is a mixture of people, recruitment and conditions differ, but for civilians wishing to join, they would become civil servants and would need to apply via the Civil Service website.
