= SS Zealandic (1911) =

British ocean liner

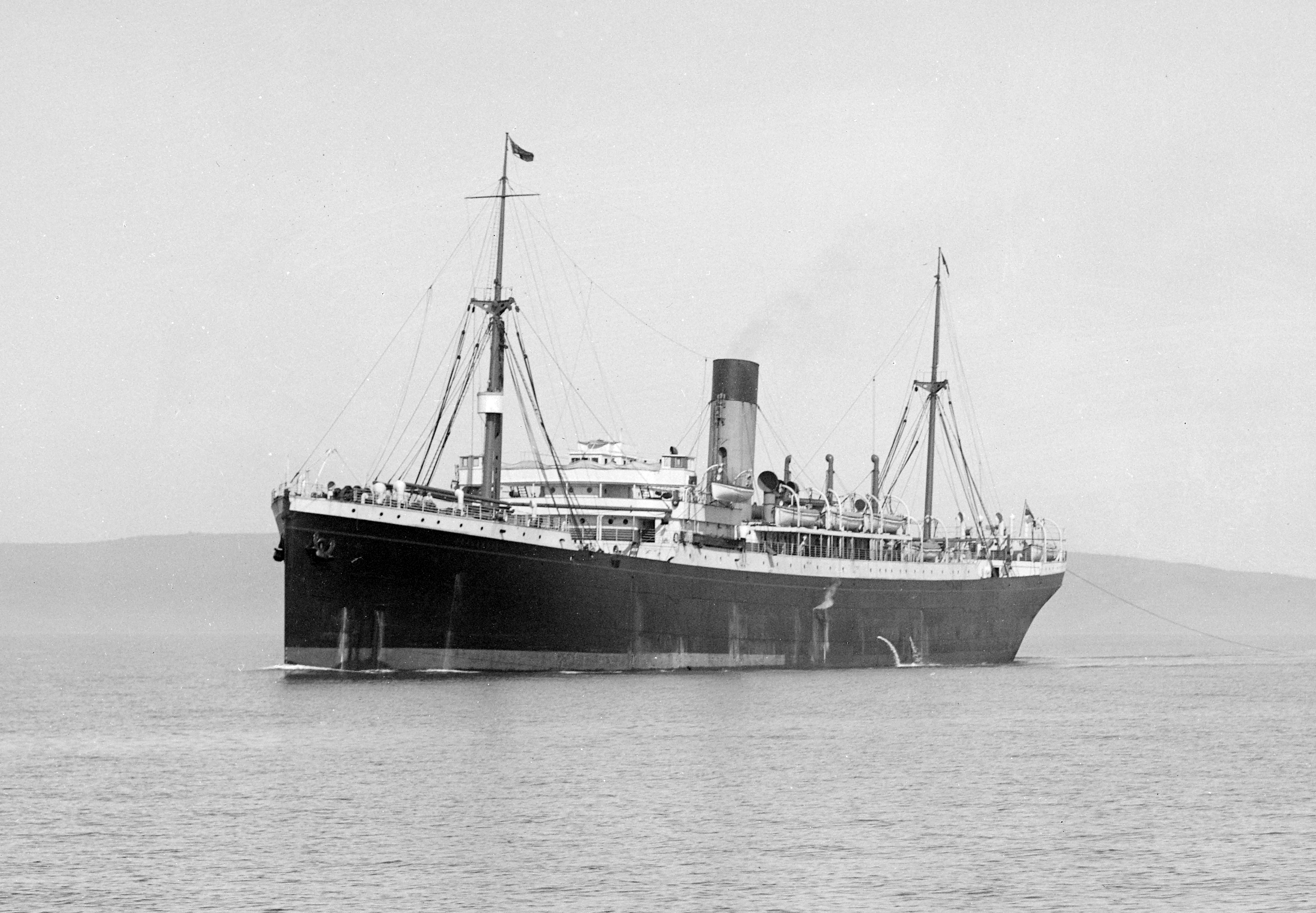
- SS Zealandic in 1923

History

United Kingdom
- Name: Zealandic; Mamillius (1926–1932); Mamari (1932–1934); Mamari III (1934–1939); Fleet Tender C (1939–1941)
- Owner: White Star Line (1911-1934); Cunard-White Star Line (1934-1939); Admiralty (1939–41)
- Operator: White Star Line (1911-1926); Aberdeen Line (1926-1932); Shaw, Savill & Albion Line (1932-1939); Admiralty (1939–1941)
- Port of registry: Liverpool, United Kingdom
- Route: Liverpool to Wellington
- Builder: Harland and Wolff, Belfast
- Yard number: 421
- Launched: 29 June 1911
- Christened: 29 June 1911
- Completed: 12 October 1911
- Maiden voyage: 30 October 1911
- Fate: Struck a sunken wreck off Cromer on 3 June 1941, then torpedoed by E-boat.

General characteristics
- Class & type: Twin-screw ocean liner
- Tonnage: 8,090 gross register tons (GRT)
- Length: 477.5 ft (145.5 m)
- Beam: 63.1 ft (19.2 m)
- Height: 31 ft (9.4 m)
- Decks: 4
- Installed power: 995 n.h.p.
- Propulsion: 2 x four cylinder quadruple expansion
- Speed: 13 knots (24 km/h)
- Notes: Carrying capacity: 100 First Class, 800 Steerage Class and 45 Second Class

SS Zealandic was a British ocean liner initially operated by White Star Line. She was used both as a passenger liner and a cargo ship as well as serving during both world wars.

As "Fleet tender C" she was used as a decoy for the British aircraft carrier HMS Hermes. She was sunk en route to the dock where she was to be converted back to cargo use.

== History ==
Zealandic was constructed by Harland and Wolff in Belfast, launched on 29 June 1911, and made her maiden voyage on 30 October 1911, from Liverpool to Wellington, New Zealand. She was used in joint service with the Shaw Savill and Albion Line for the Liverpool to Wellington route. During one such voyage on 22 January 1913, Zealandic departed Wellington with a then record cargo of exported wool, while also being chartered as an immigrant carrier by the Australian government.

=== First World War ===
On 2 July 1915 she had a close encounter with German submarine U-39 which pursued her; the ship's speed enabled her to escape. She remained in White Star Line service on the route until 1917 when, due to the First World War, she was commandeered by the Royal Navy for the transportation of troops. On 15 June 1919, she was released from military service and returned to the White Star Line.

=== Between the wars ===
The ship was awarded £6,350 following the successful rescue of the disabled sailing vessel Garthsnaid in 1923. Zealandic towed Garthsnaid to safety between Cape Howe and Melbourne.

The Aberdeen Line purchased Zealandic in 1926 and subsequently renamed her Mamilius. The ship was later transferred back to Shaw Savill and Albion in 1932, and renamed Mamari. When White Star line merged with Cunard in 1934 she served on Shaw, Savill & Albion's Australian route, bearing the name Mamari III.

=== Second World War ===
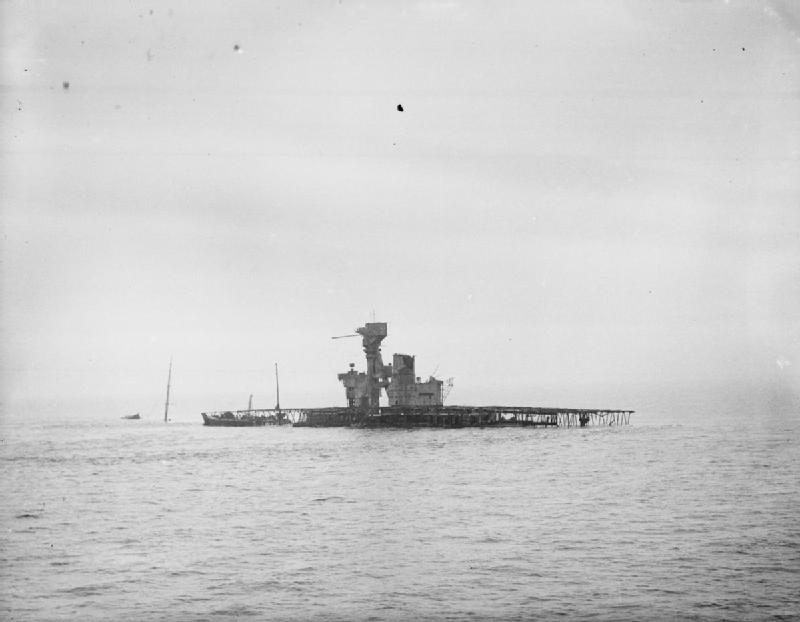
Wreck of Mamari III.

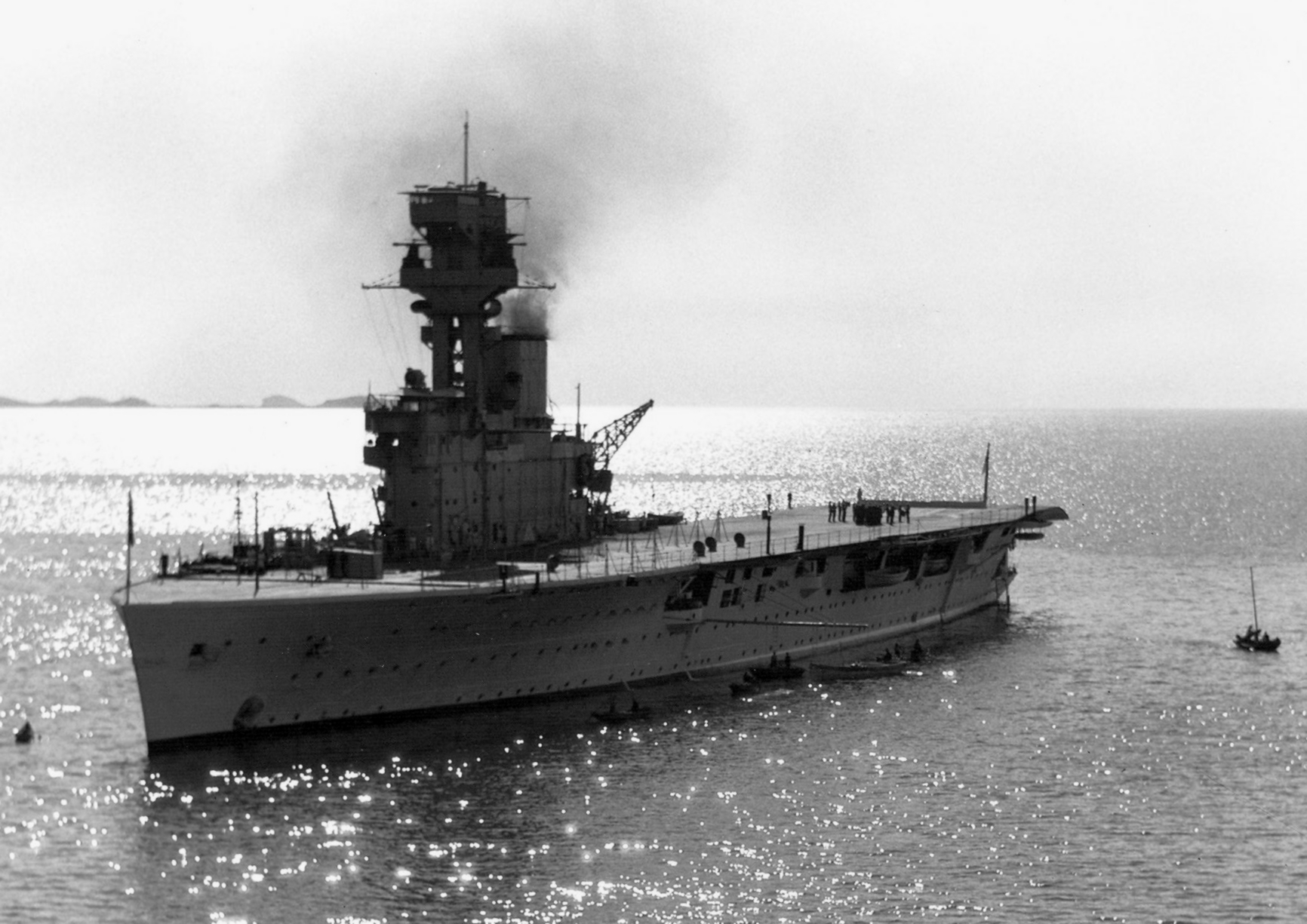
HMS Hermes, which SS Mamari III was converted to resemble as a decoy ship.

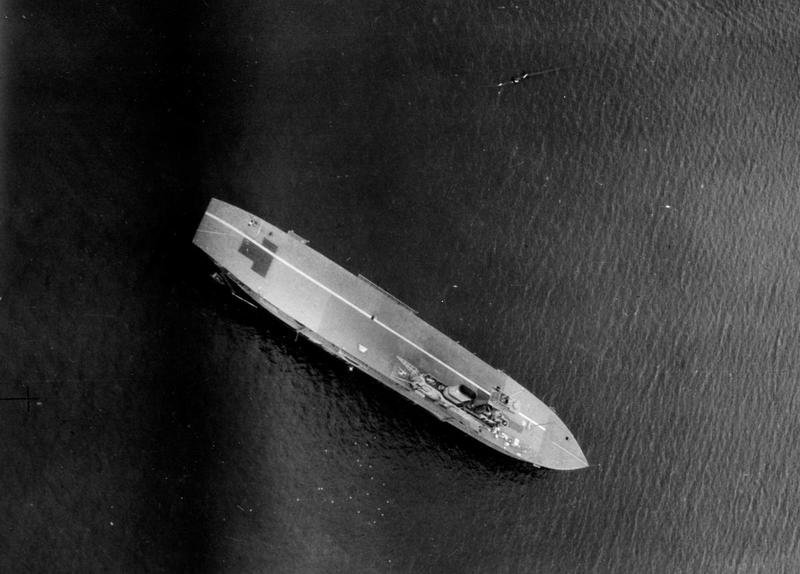
Aerial view of SS Mamari III disguised as Hermes with a false flight deck and island.

The ship was sold in September 1939 to the Admiralty for military service during the Second World War, and was refitted to be disguised as the British carrier HMS Hermes. In this form she carried the name "Fleet Tender C". On 4 June 1941, while on course for Chatham Docks in Kent to be converted back to a cargo vessel, she was attacked by German aircraft off the English coast near Cromer, Norfolk. While trying to evade the attack she struck a submerged wreck (the Ahamo at 53-22N, 0-59E which had struck a mine on 8 April that year) and ran aground. She was intended to be salvaged and refloated; however, before this was possible the beached ship was torpedoed by German E-boats. The crew were taken off by the rescue tug Sabine and landed at Grimsby.
