= Army Fire Service =

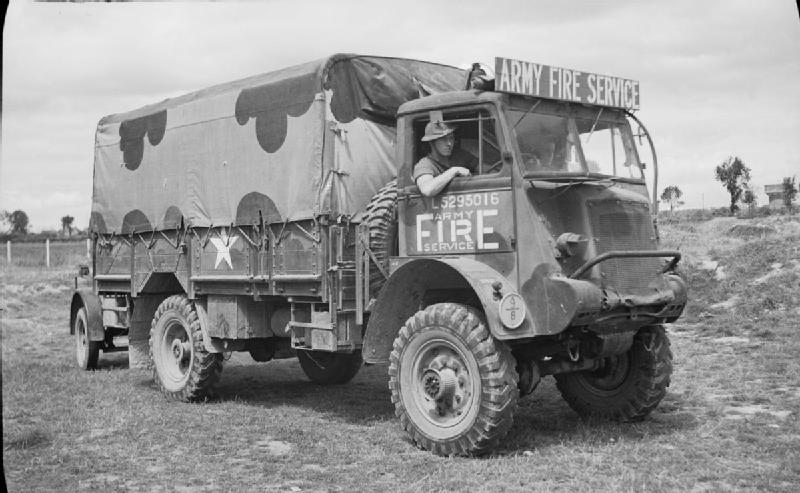
- An Army Fire Service truck in Normandy during 1944
- Active: 1941 - 1990
- Country: United Kingdom
- Branch: British Army
- Type: Firefighting
- Part of: Pioneer Corps (1941-1946); Royal Army Service Corps (1946-1961); Royal Army Ordnance Corps (1961-1990)

The Army Fire Service (AFS), later called the Army Department Fire Service, was the fire service which performed firefighting duties on British Army camps.

== History ==
Following the outbreak of the Second World War, fire brigades were established at several major British Army bases. In July 1941 a Fire Fighting Wing was established as part of the Pioneer Corps. This became known as the Army Fire Service, which remained part of the Pioneer Corps for the remainder of the war. Army Fire Service units served in many theatres of the war.

The Fire Fighting Wing was disbanded on 1 July 1946 and the Army Fire Service became part of the Royal Army Service Corps. The force transferred to the Royal Army Ordnance Corps in 1961; at this time it was also civilianised.

The Army Fire Service was absorbed into the Defence Fire Service in 1990.
