= Wildlife inspector =

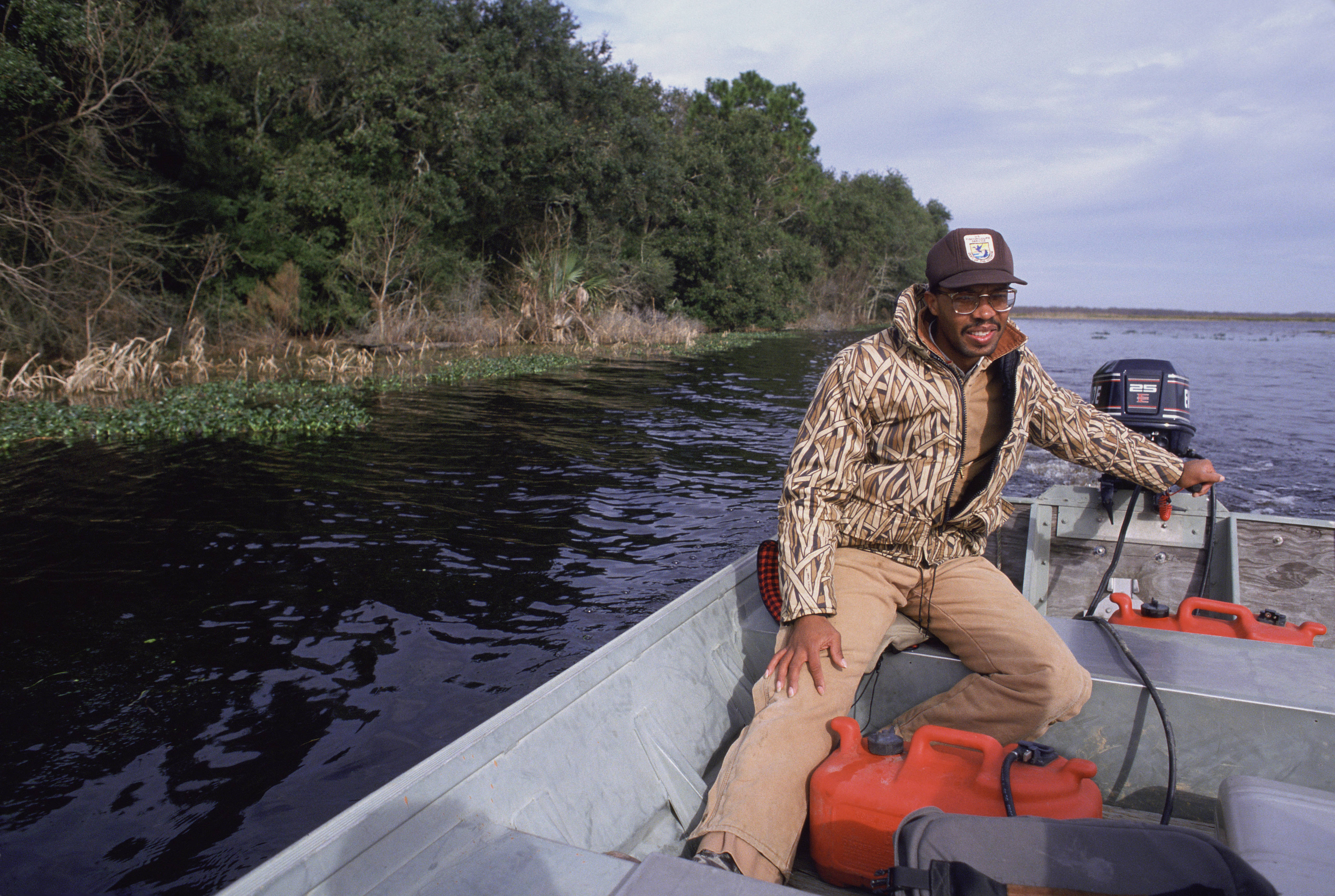
Inspector drives a motor boat in Louisiana.

A wildlife inspector is a person empowered by law to protect wildlife.

== United Kingdom ==
In the United Kingdom, wildlife inspectors are Natural England and Animal and Plant Health Agency officers authorised to investigate wildlife crime and related offences by the Secretary of State for Environment, Food and Rural Affairs under S19ZA of the Wildlife and Countryside Act 1981. An authorisation can be subject to any conditions or limitations specified in it.

=== Powers of entry ===
A wildlife inspector may, at any reasonable time and (if required to do so) upon producing evidence that he is authorised:

- enter^{†} and inspect any premises for the purpose of ascertaining whether an offence under section 6, section 9(5) or section 13(2) is being, or has been, committed on those premises,
- enter^{†} and inspect any premises where he has reasonable cause to believe that any birds included in Schedule 4 are kept, for the purpose of ascertaining whether an offence under section 7 is being, or has been, committed on those premises,
- enter any premises (except a dwelling) for the purpose of ascertaining whether an offence under section 14 is being, or has been, committed on those premises,
- enter and inspect any premises for the purpose of verifying any statement or representation which has been made by an occupier, or any document or information which has been furnished by him, and which he made or furnished
  - for the purposes of obtaining (whether for himself or another) a registration under section 7 or a licence under section 16, or
  - in connection with a registration or license held by him.

But in the case of the sections marked ^{†}, an inspector cannot enter a dwelling except for purposes connected with:

- a registration or held by an occupier of the dwelling, or
- an application by an occupier of the dwelling for a registration or license.

=== Other powers ===
A wildlife inspector may, for the purpose of ascertaining whether an offense under section 6, 7, section 14 section 9(5)], 13(2) or is being, or has been, committed in respect of any specimen, require any person who has the specimen in his possession or control to make it available for examination by the inspector.

Any person who has in his possession or control any live bird or other animal shall give any wildlife inspector acting in the exercise of powers conferred by this section such assistance as the inspector may reasonably require for the purpose of examining the bird or other animal. It is an offence to fail without reasonable excuse to give any assistance reasonably required.

Any person who intentionally obstructs a wildlife inspector acting in the exercise of powers of entry examination shall be guilty of an offence. Any person who, with intent to deceive, falsely pretends to be a wildlife inspector shall be guilty of an offence.

== United States ==
In the United States, a wildlife inspector is a person employed by the United States Fish and Wildlife Service Office of Law Enforcement in the defense against the illegal wildlife trade by ensuring that wildlife shipments comply with American and international wildlife protection laws.

Stationed at major international airports, ocean ports, and border crossings, wildlife inspectors monitor an annual trade worth more than $2.8 billion. They stop illegal shipments, intercept smuggled wildlife and wildlife products, and help the United States fulfill its commitment to global wildlife conservation.

=== Laws enforced ===
- 16 USC 668 - Bald & Golden Eagle Protection Act
- 16 USC 703 - Migratory Bird Treaty Act
- 16 USC 1361 - Marine Mammal Protection Act
- 16 USC 1531 - Endangered Species Act (includes the Convention on the International Trade in Endangered Species - CITES)
- 16 USC 2401 - Antarctic Conservation Act
- 16 USC 4201 - African Elephant Conservation Act
- 16 USC 4901 - Wild Bird Conservation Act
- 16 USC 5306 - Rhino Tiger Conservation Act
- 18 USC 42 and 16 USC. 3371 - Lacey Act Amendments

=== Locations ===
By law, most commercial wildlife shipments come through 17 'designated ports' - Anchorage, Alaska; Atlanta, Georgia; Baltimore, Maryland; Boston, Massachusetts; Chicago, Illinois; Dallas, Texas; Honolulu, Hawaii; Houston, Texas; Los Angeles, California; Louisville, Kentucky; Memphis, Tennessee; Miami, Florida; New Orleans, Louisiana; New York, New York/Newark, New Jersey; Portland, Oregon; San Francisco, California; and Seattle, Washington. The Service operates wildlife inspection offices in these cities. Wildlife inspectors also staff 14 locations along the Mexican and Canadian borders and five additional ports that handle specific types of wildlife traffic.

A Senior Wildlife Inspector is stationed at the Federal Law Enforcement Training Center (FLETC) in Glynco, GA and coordinates training for Service Wildlife Inspector and Special Agents, Customs officers and other International, Federal, State and Local law enforcement agencies that deal with the import/export of wildlife.

=== The job ===
The United States is one of the world's largest markets for wildlife and wildlife products. High-volume 'live' traffic includes exotic reptiles, tropical fish, and primates. Manufactured products (such as boots, shoes, purses, jewelry, caviar, and meats) and less 'processed' wildlife items (such as hunting trophies, feathers, furs, skins, raw coral, and shells) are also common. Wildlife inspectors enforce a range of US and international laws, regulations, and treaties that protect wildlife and limit commercial traffic in endangered animals and plants.

Wildlife inspectors clear legal imports and exports and seize shipments that violate the law. They make sure that wildlife imports and exports are accompanied by the required permits and licenses, and verify that the contents of shipments match the items listed on declaration forms. They pay special attention to live wildlife, checking to see that animals in transit are treated humanely.

Although wildlife inspectors spend most of their time processing commercial cargo shipments, they also keep tabs on international passenger traffic. Unwary travelers all too often return from abroad with illegal wildlife souvenirs. Many smuggling rings use human couriers; inspectors find protected animals hidden in clothing and stuffed in suitcases and handbags.

Wildlife inspectors work closely with Service Special Agents and counterparts from Customs and Border Protection and other Federal agencies that police international trade. They staff special enforcement task forces that conduct inspection blitzes at international mail processing facilities, or target specific enforcement problems, such as the import and sale of medicinal products made from endangered species.

Outreach is also an important part of the job. Wildlife inspectors meet with customs brokers, trade associations, international travelers, and hunters going abroad to explain wildlife import/export rules and regulations. They are popular guest speakers at schools, nature centers, community conservation programs, and environmental fairs.

Inspectors provided international training to their Canadian and Mexican counterparts, and have traveled internationally to countries such as Nepal, China, Italy, Mongolian and Botswana to provide training to other wildlife law enforcement agencies in those countries.
