= Richard Dunston =

English shipbuilder

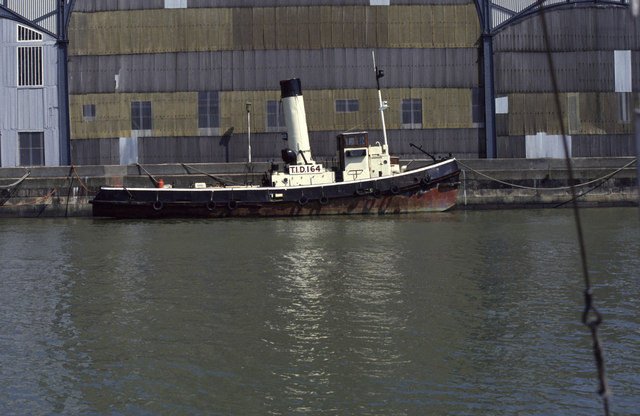
- TID164, one of a class of wartime tugs designed and built by Dunston's
- Company type: Private company
- Industry: Shipbuilding
- Founded: 1858
- Fate: Closed
- Headquarters: Hessle, East Riding of Yorkshire, England

Richard Dunston was a British shipbuilding company based on the River Humber in England. Founded in 1858, the firm evolved from building wooden inland barges far from the coast to becoming a pioneer of fully welded steel ship construction. Over more than a century of operation, it produced thousands of vessels for commercial and military use before closing in the 1990s.

The company is best known for its role during the Second World War, when it developed and mass-produced the prefabricated TID class of all-welded steel harbour tugs for the British Admiralty. This industrial approach, using standardized designs and sectional construction, allowed rapid production at an unprecedented scale and influenced later shipbuilding methods. At its peak, Richard Dunston operated yards at Thorne and Hessle and built more than 4,700 vessels, including tugs, coasters, tankers, and naval auxiliaries.

== History ==
Before 1858, Richard Dunston owned a boatyard at Torksey on the Foss Dyke, but in that year he sold the yard, and established a new one at Thorne, on the north bank of the Stainforth and Keadby Canal. It was 12 miles (19 km) from the River Trent, and some 45 miles (72 km) from the sea. He built wooden barges, using locally-grown, hand-sawn timber. In common with many boatyards at the time, Dunston's was self-contained, with facilities for making sails, ropes and running gear. This developed into a profitable sideline, supplying ropes to many local industries, and other items to chandlers based at Hull and Grimsby. While repairs to existing hulls were a major part of the output of the yard, vessels capable of carrying up to 80 tons were built, for use on the Humber and its connecting navigations. The hulls were initially clinker built, using overlapping joints between the timbers, but later carvel construction was used, where the timbers butted up against each other to produce a much smoother hull. By the end of the nineteenth century, boat sizes had standardised somewhat, with most craft being either Sheffield-sized keels with square rigging, or larger Humber sloops. Sheffield-sized boats were 61.5 by 15.5 feet (18.7 by 4.7 m). Output was fairly low, with an average of one and a half vessels per year between 1858 and 1914, although a celebration was held when the third vessel in one year was launched.

In 1902, control of the yard passed to Thomas Dunston following the death of his father, and in 1910 to the 20-year-old grandson of the founder. He set about modernising the business to enable the construction of iron and steel ships, the first of which was completed in 1917. The company built three wooden drifters for the Admiralty in 1918. Subsequently, new buildings were erected, and new plant was installed to cope with the construction of steel ships, after which only one further wooden vessel was built. It was supplied to a carrier based at Owston Ferry, was named Constance, and was completed in 1925. The size of vessels that could be built at the Thorne site was limited by the size of Keadby lock, which was 79.5 by 21.5 feet (24.2 by 6.6 m). Because it connected to the tidal River Trent, ships which were longer than this could pass through when the river was level with the canal, and both sets of gates could be opened, but the width was restricted to about 21 feet (6.4 m). Output during the 1920s and 1930s was somewhat reduced, but was bolstered by further orders from the Admiralty.

Dunstons bought the Henry Scarr shipbuilding yard at Hessle in 1932, which allowed ships to be launched directly into the Humber, although the Henry Scarr name was retained until 1961, when the yard became known as Richard Dunston (Hessle) Ltd. Dunston's pioneered construction of all-welded ships in the UK, finding that they could mass-produce a single design more efficiently than traditional riveting. During the Second World War they designed the all-welded steel TID class tug, and built 159 of them, 152 at Thorne and seven at Hessle, with one completed ship leaving the shipyard at six-day intervals. Sections were fabricated elsewhere by companies with spare welding capacity, and were brought to the yard by lorry. Eight sections were needed to make a complete tug, and many of the shipyard welders were women.

Between 1941 and 1945 the two yards built around 200 other vessels for the Admiralty, including barges, launches, lighters, coasters, target vessels, and steam and diesel powered puffers, known as VIC lighters. In late 1945 they build 18 tugs for use on the Irrawaddy river, while in 1946 they built waterboats for Burma, and lighters and barges for use on the RIver Thames.

In 1974 the Dunston family sold both yards to the Ingram Corporation of America. By 1985, much of the demand for small steel ships had ceased, and the Thorne yard was closed. Soon afterwards, Ingram's decided to sell the Hessle yard, and in 1986 it was taken over by a management buyout. The Dutch shipbuilders Damen Shipyards Group injected new capital, and soon became the sole owners. Following this, the yard built a variety of vessels, including four Clyde car ferries, a low air draft dry cargo ship, gas tankers and naval tugs.

In December 1994, the company went into liquidation and the Hessle yard closed. It was used as a recycling yard for several years following its closure, but most of the site has now been rebuilt with offices and car showrooms. Richard Dunston ship repairs still exists further east along the Humber Estuary. During the life of the company, they had constructed over 4,700 vessels, which included 470 built for the navy or military, amounting to around 20 per cent of their total output. In 2024 Richard Dunston Ltd was restored by the Dunston family and now develops property in South West London

=== The TID project ===
In 1942, the Admiralty realised that a large batch of tugs would be needed, to avoid the need to requisition similar vessels from existing users. They also wanted to keep the slipways at yards which were better suited to building larger ships clear of small-scale projects. The brief that they issued was "to design, organise and start work immediately, towards achieving, in the shortest possible time, delivery of one tug per week using within the process, little or no shipyard labour." Dunston's were awarded the initial contract, because they had pioneered the use of electric arc welding of hulls, a process which was much quicker and less labour-intensive than using rivetting. The ships would be constructed from pre-fabricated sections, a method used in the United States for the production of Liberty ships.

The design was for a ship 65 feet (20 m) long by 17 feet (5.2 m) wide, which was split vertically into eight sections, with unit No.1 at the stern proceeding forwards to unit No.8 at the bow. Each section would be a maximum of 10 feet (3.0 m) long and 13 feet (4.0 m) deep with a maximum weight of six tons, allowing them to be transported to the shipyard by road from the locations at which they were built. None of the frames were bent, and where the hull plates needed to be curved, the curve was in one dimension only. The joints between plates on any one unit were left unwelded for 10 inches (25 cm) at the outer edges, so that if any deviation from the designed profile occurred, the plates could be sprung together, but because each section was made using jigs, alignment issues did not occur.

Despite the angular design of the flat plates, trials using models in a test tank at Teddington showed that the resistance of the TID design was less than that of a conventionally profiled tug of a similar size up to 7.5 knots, but that at higher speeds, the conventional model was more efficient. As the design speed was 8.5 knots, this was not thought to be a serious consideration. Because the sections were to be produced by engineering companies with no knowledge of shipbuilding, Dunston's produced over 1,400 drawings covering every detail, much of which was normally omitted from conventional shipyard drawings. The frames for the vessels were placed at 21-inch (53 cm) centres, and the drawings included full dimensions at every frame. All joints between adjacent sections were made halfway between two frames, and again, detailed dimensions of the outer edges were provided.

Initially, Dunston's used four fabricators to manufacture the sections, but this was soon increased to 13, and to minimise the effects of disruption on the supply of sections, each section was made by two fabricators. The fabricators involved were Robert Jenkins and Co Ltd of Rotherham (S1); Foster, Yates and Thom Ltd of Blackburn (S1 and S2); A J Riley and Son Ltd of Manchester (S2); Nortons (Tividale) Ltd of Tipton (S3); Robert Dempster and Sons Ltd of Elland (S3 and S4); Wrights Forge and Engineering Co Ltd of Dudley (S4); John Booth and Sons (Bolton) Ltd of Bolton (S5); Newton Chambers and Co Ltd of Thorncliffe, Sheffield (S5); Head, Wrightson and Co Ltd of Stockton on Tees (S6); Charles Roberts and Co Ltd of Wakefield (S6); C and W Walker Ltd of Donnington, Wellington (S7); William Neill and Sons Ltd of St Helens (S7 and S8); and Orthostyle Ltd of Ashby, Scunthorpe (S8). The sections were too large to be transported to Thorne by rail, and were therefore moved by road, despite the width exceeding the maximum permissible width of 7.5 feet (2.3 m) for road vehicles at the time.

At the Thorne yard, the sections were unloaded using a hand-operated gantry. When a complete set us sections was available, they were moved to the construction area, and placed on carefully placed keel blocks, which remained in position for the duration of the project. It proved easy to produce a hull in seven days, and Dunston's created a second construction berth, allowing two ships per week to be launched. As experience was gained, a hull could be produced in five days, and some were completed in only four days. The ships were fitted with a two-cylinder steam engine powered by a vertical boiler and developing 220 hp (160 kW). These were supplied by eleven different manufacturers, and were fitted at Dunston's Hessle yard. The first hull to be launched was towed from Thorne to Hessle, where the engine and boiler were fitted. In order to test its operation, a voyage back to Thorne was made, from where it towed the next hull to Hessle before final delivery. This process was then repeated for each subsequent vessel. The initial order was for twelve tugs, but as the concept proved successful, this was increased to 25, then 50 and then 100. All were ordered as coal burners, although ten of them were changed to use oil, for possible use in the Mediterranean and the Far East. A further batch of 50 oil burners were ordered, and finally a batch of 32 oil burners which were adapted for tropical service. Of this last batch, two were built at Thorne, seven at Hessle, and 23 were built by Wm Pickersgill and Sons Ltd at their Sunderland yard.

=== Other prefabricated designs ===
Following the success of building prefabricated TID tugs, a similar approach was used to construct a number of small coastal tankers. These were built in anticipation of the D–day invasion of France. The design process involved selecting a prototype ship, 148 by 27 feet (45.1 by 8.2 m), and using it to create a straight-line design for a type of ship known as a Channel Tanker, which became known as a CHANT. After testing of a model in a tank, minor changes to the shape of the bow were made, and an aerofoil-shaped fin was added to the stern, similar to that used on the tugs. Apart from the fin, all of the plates used in the construction were flat or only rolled in a single direction, and none of the frames were bent. Individual sections were either 10 feet (3.0 m) or 20 feet (6.1 m) long, and no section exceeded 13 tons in weight. The sections were delivered to the shipyards by road, where they were welded together. To aid alignment, the seams were not welded for the final 10 inches (25 cm) where they would butt onto an adjacent section.

The design included a double-skinned hull, to reduce the risk of leakage of petroleum spirit, as they were intended to land on flat beaches. Dunston's yard at Hessle was one of five which manufactured a total of 43 CHANT tankers between February and July 1944. They completed 12, and although their original order was for 24, the success of the D–day operation and the laying of pipelines to carry fuel from England to France, known as PLUTO, resulted in there being less need for tankers. Consequently the final 12 were redesigned to become dry cargo carriers, known as the 'Empire F' class,

A total of 25 prefabricated 'Empire F' class coasters were built instead of CHANT tankers, 12 at Dunston's yard at Hessle and 13 by Goole Shipbuilding and Engineering. They were made from 28 prefabricated sections, and the ship that was originally to have been CHANT 14 was to become 'Fabric 14', but by the time of launch was known as Empire Fabric. All of the ships used the 'Empire' prefix, and a name beginning with 'F'. The CHANT and Empire F ships were built on slipways, where cranes were available, and so assembling the sections was more straightforward than for the tugs. The tankers were fitted with 220/270 hp oil engines, enabling them to travel at 7.5 knots, which was considered adequate for short journeys across the English Channel to French beaches. Slightly larger 300 hp engines were fitted in the dry cargo coasters, giving them a cruising speed of 8 knots.

During 1945, Dunston's built eleven prefabricated 'Shelt' class coasters, which were similar to the 'Empire F' class, but had shelter decks, as they were intended for use in the Far East. Another eleven 'Shelt' coasters were constructed by Goole Shipbuilding and Repairing. Many were operated by the Straits Steamship Company of Singapore, on behalf of the Ministry of War Transport. In 1946 they bought 16 of the vessels which they had been operating, and subsequently obtained two more.

== Ships built ==
Records of the ships built before the 1930s are not comprehensive, but after 1932, Dunston's built 1358 vessels at the Thorne yard and 636 at Hessle.

=== Hessle ===
| Yard No | Name | Type | Launch | Notes |
|---|---|---|---|---|
| S416 – S417 | Empire Isle; Empire Bank | Empire Isle class coaster | 1941 | |
| S418 – S424 | Empire Birch; Empire Linden; Empire Teak; Empire Race; Empire Sprite; Empire Titan; Empire Oberon | Near Warrior class tug | 1941/42 | For Ministry of War Transport |
| S430 – S433 | Empire Mascot; Empire Maisie; Empire Charles; Empire Walter | Near Warrior class tug | 1943/44 | For Ministry of War Transport |
| S434 | Mallard | Empire-F dry cargo coaster | 1944 | For General Steam Navigation Co, London |
| S435 – S446 | CHANT 1 – CHANT 12 | Chant-class coastal tanker | 1944 | For Ministry of War Transport |
| S447 – S458 | Empire Fabric; Empire Fabian; Empire Fable; Empire Farringdon; Empire Fanfare; Empire Faversham; Empire Facility; Empire Faraway; Empire Fanal; Empire Fastness; Empire Farrier; Empire Fathom | Empire F dry cargo coaster | 1944/45 | For Ministry of War Transport |
| S461 | Empire Elinor | Near Warrior class tug | 1944 | For Ministry of War Transport |
| S462 | Mavis | Empire-F dry cargo coaster | 1945 | For General Steam Navigation Co, London |
| S463 | Empire Becky | Near Warrior class tug | 1944 | For Ministry of War Transport |
| S464 – S475 | Empire Seasheltie; Empire Seabeach; Empire Seahawk; Empire Seafront; Empire Seaboy; Empire Seabreeze; Empire Seacoast; Empire Seagull; Empire Seabird; Empire Sealion; Empire Seaview; Empire Seaport | Shelt-type prefabricated coaster | 1945 | |
| S476 – S477 | Empire Maymead; Empire Maytown | C-class coaster | 1945 | |
| S478 | TID 170 | TID tug | 1945 | For Ministry of War Transport |
| S479 – S484 | TID 171 – TID 176 | TID tugs (6) | 1946 | For Ministry of War Transport |
| | Seaspring | | 1957 | |
| S802 | Sir Winston Churchill | Topsail 3-masted schooner | 1966 | For Sail Training Association |
| | Dunster | RMAS Clovelly Class Fleet Tender | 1972 | (year of commissioning) |
| | Felsted | RMAS Clovelly Class Fleet Tender | 1972 | (year of commissioning) |
| | Fotherby | RMAS Clovelly Class Fleet Tender | 1972 | (year of commissioning) |
| | Froxfield | RMAS Clovelly Class Fleet Tender | 1972 | (year of commissioning) |
| | Hambledon | RMAS Clovelly Class Fleet Tender | 1973 | (year of commissioning) |
| | Harlech | RMAS Clovelly Class Fleet Tender | 1973 | (year of commissioning) |
| | Headcorn | RMAS Clovelly Class Fleet Tender | 1973 | (year of commissioning) |
| | Hever | RMAS Clovelly Class Fleet Tender | 1973 | (year of commissioning) |
| | Holmwood | RMAS Clovelly Class Fleet Tender | 1973 | (year of commissioning) |
| | Horning | RMAS Clovelly Class Fleet Tender | 1973 | (year of commissioning) |
| | Lamlash | RMAS Clovelly Class Fleet Tender | 1974 | (year of commissioning) |
| | Lechlade | RMAS Clovelly Class Fleet Tender | 1974 | (year of commissioning) |
| | Llandovery | RMAS Clovelly Class Fleet Tender | 1974 | (year of commissioning) |
| | Loyal Supporter | RMAS Loyal Class Fleet Tender | 1978 | (year of commissioning) |
| | Loyal Watcher | RMAS Loyal Class Fleet Tender | 1978 | (year of commissioning) |
| | Melton | RMAS Clovelly Class Fleet Tender | 1981 | (year of commissioning) |
| | Menai | RMAS Clovelly Class Fleet Tender | 1981 | (year of commissioning) |
| | Meon | RMAS Clovelly Class Fleet Tender | 1982 | (year of commissioning) |
| | Milford | RMAS Clovelly Class Fleet Tender | 1982 | (year of commissioning) |
| H915 | Oxcar | Tug | 1978 | For Forth Ports Authority Flying Spindrift |
| H952 | MV Loch Striven | Ro-Ro Ferry | 1986 | For Caledonian MacBrayne |
| H953 | MV Loch Linnhe | Ro-Ro Ferry | 1986 | For Caledonian MacBrayne |
| H954 | MV Loch Riddon | Ro-Ro Ferry | 1986 | For Caledonian MacBrayne |
| H955 | MV Loch Ranza | Ro-Ro Ferry | 1987 | For Caledonian MacBrayne |
| H961 | Dunker | Tug | 1988 | For Helsingsborgs Bogser |
| H968 | Geira | Ferry | 1988 | For Shetland Islands Council |
| H973 | Roseberry Cross | Tug | 1989 | For Cory Towage |
| H974 | Cleveland Cross | Tug | 1989 | For Cory Towage |
| H1004 | Fiery Cross | Tug | 1993 | For Cory Towage |
| H1005 | Phoenix Cross | Tug | 1993 | For Cory Towage |
| H1006 | Bramble Bush Bay | Chain Ferry | 1994 | For Swanage Motor Road & Ferry Company |

Sources: Ships Photos and Historic Ships Register

=== Thorne ===
| Yard No | Name | Type | Launch | Notes |
|---|---|---|---|---|
| | Annie Maud | Carvel-built keel | 1898 | For Robinson Bros, millers, Rotherham. 1 of 4 |
| | Mayday | Carvel-built keel | 1900 | For Thos Hanley & Sons, millers, Doncaster |
| | Furley's Else | Carvel-built keel | 1914 | For Furley & Co |
| | Enterprise | | 1921 | For South Yorkshire Navigation Co |
| T98 | Selby Argo | 220-ton steel lighter | 1921 | For Selby Oil Mills. 1 of 5 |
| T106 | Wharncliffe | Sheffield-sized | 1923 | For Bleasdales. Motorised 1953 |
| T107 | Dovecliffe | | 1923 | For Bleasdales. Motorised in 1945 |
| T114 | Shirecliffe | Sheffield-sized | 1923 | For Bleasdales. Motorised 1945 |
| T116 | Gar | Sheffield-sized steel keel | 1924 | For Furley & Co |
| T118 | Highcliffe | Sheffield-sized | 1924 | For Bleasdales. Motorised 1943 |
| T122 | Lightcliffe | | 1924 | For Bleasdales. Motorised 1937 |
| T128 | Beecliffe | Sheffield-sized | 1924 | For S&SYN, mortgaged to Bleasdales. Motorised in 1937 |
| T131 | Annie H | Humber sloop | 1925 | For J W Handson |
| T132 | Whitliffe | Sheffield-sized | 1925 | For S&SYN, mortgaged to Bleasdales |
| T133 | Ferncliffe | Sheffield-sized keel | 1925 | For S&SYN, mortgaged to Bleasdales. Motorised 1937 |
| T136 | Michael | 80-ton motor tank barge | 1925 | For Harkers |
| T142 | Salvager A | Sloop | 1926 | For A Leggott, Owston Ferry. Motorised 1933 |
| T153 | Rosa A | 110-ton dumb tank barge | 1928 | For Harkers |
| T164 | A.Victory | motor barge | 1929 | For James Barraclough |
| T170 | Drake | dump tank barge | 1930 | For James W Cook |
| T171 | Dauntless | motor tank barge | 1930 | For James W Cook |
| T178 | Danum | Sheffield lighter | 1932 | For Hanleys, Doncaster. Motorised 1944 |
| | John Adams | Battleship tender | 1934 | For British Admiralty |
| T179 | Daybreak | Humber Keel | 1936 | For Hanley's, flour millers of Doncaster |
| T186 | Gainsborough Trader | motor barge | 1931 | For Furley & Co |
| T187 | Trent | Steamer | 1931 | For Grimsby Packet Co |
| | Southcliffe | Humber Keel | 1940 | For W Bleasdale & Co |
| T349 | Vista | Tug | 1940 | For Vokins & Co |
| T352 | Meads | Tug | 1940 | For River Lighterage Co Ltd |
| T358 – T361 | Empire Maple; Empire Willow; Empire Cedar; Empire Plane | 'Maple' type tug | 1941 | For Ministry of War Transport |
| T364 – T365 | Empire Spruce; Empire Folk | 'Maple' type tug | 1942 | For Ministry of War Transport |
| T369 – T372 | VIC 1 – VIC 4 | Victualling Inshore Craft | 1941/42 | For British Admiralty |
| T373 – T376 | Empire Ariel; Empire Seraph; Empire Imp; Empire Toby | 'Maple' type tug | 1942 | For Ministry of War Transport |
| T377 | Pinklake | Tug | 1943 | For River Lighterage Co Ltd |
| T378 – T381 | VIC 7 – VIC 10 | Victualling Inshore Craft | 1942 | For British Admiralty |
| T383 – T386 | Empire Lewis; Empire Percy; Empire Lilliput; Empire Andrew | 'Maple' type tug | 1943/44 | For Ministry of War Transport |
| T387 – T392 | VIC 21 – VIC 26 | Victualling Inshore Craft | 1942/43 | For British Admiralty |
| T390 | Advance (VIC 24) | Clyde puffer | 1942 | For Ministry of War Transport |
| T393 – T396 | Empire Laird; Empire Townsman; Empire Skipper; Empire Runner | Severn collier | 1943 | For Ministry of War Transport |
| T399 – T410 | TID 1 – TID 12 | TID Tugs (12) | 1943 | For Ministry of War Transport |
| T411 – T413 | VIC 32/36/37 | Victualling Inshore Craft | 1943/44 | For British Admiralty |
| T414 – T450 | TID 14 – TID 50 | TID tugs (37) | 1943 | For Ministry of War Transport |
| T443 | TID 43 | TID Tug | 1943 | For Ministry of War Transport. Now Seaport Alpha |
| T451 | TID 51 | TID tug | 1944 | For Ministry of War Transport |
| T452 – T460 | VIC 40 – VIC 48 | Diesel Victualling Inshore Craft | 1944/45 | For British Admiralty |
| T461 – T510 | TID 52 – TID 101 | TID tug (50) | 1944 | For Ministry of War Transport |
| T511 – T520 | VIC 83 – VIC 92 | Victualling Inshore Craft | 1944/45 | For British Admiralty |
| T523 – T529 | TID 102 – TID 108 | TID tugs (7) | 1944 | For Ministry of War Transport |
| T530 | TID 109 | TID tug | 1945 | For Ministry of War Transport |
| T531 – T534 | TID 110 – TID 113 | TID tugs (4) | 1944 | For Ministry of War Transport |
| T535 | TID 114 | TID tug | 1945 | For Ministry of War Transport |
| T536 – T539 | TID 115 – TID 118 | TID tugs (4) | 1944 | For Ministry of War Transport |
| T540 – T572 | TID 119 – TID 151 | TID tugs (33) | 1945 | For Ministry of War Transport |
| T575 – T578 | VIC 93 – VIC 96 | Victualling Inshore Craft | 1945 | For British Admiralty |
| T580 – T597 | | shallow-draught tugs | 1946 | For Irrawaddy River |
| T629 – T630 | TID 168 – TID 169 | TID tugs (2) | 1946 | For Ministry of War Transport |
| | Leicester Trader | Trent dumb boat | 1953 | |
| T897 | Cormooring | Salvage Vessel | 1955 | now Medway Rhino |

Sources: Historic Ships Register and Taylor 2009.

== Bibliography ==
- Harvey, W. J. (2019). The TID Tugs of World War Two. World Ship Society. ISBN 978-0-9560769-9-1.
- Mitchell, W. H.; Sawyer, L. A. (1990). The Empire Ships. London, New York, Hamburg, Hong Kong: Lloyd's of London Press. pp. 222–225. ISBN 978-1-85044-275-2.
- Taylor, Mike (2009). Richard Dunston Limited of Thorne & Hessle. Barnsley: Pen and Sword Books. ISBN 978-1-84563-094-2.
