= Maritime Volunteer Service =

UK charitable organization

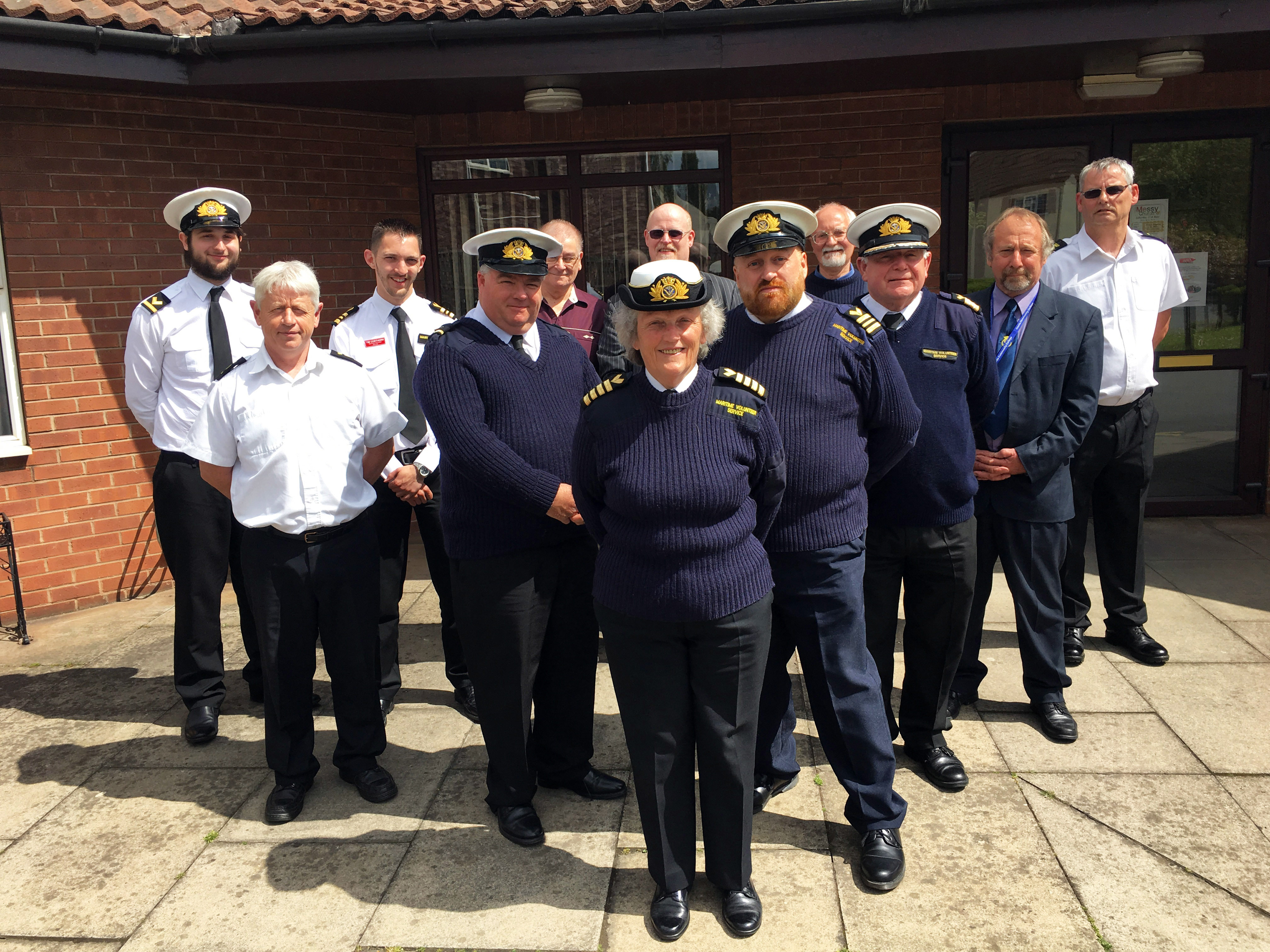
- The MVS management team with local Yorkshire volunteers in May 2016.
- Abbreviation: MVS
- Formation: April 1994
- Type: Charity
- Legal status: Registered charity
- Purpose: Training in Maritime Skills
- Headquarters: Warrington, United Kingdom
- Region served: United Kingdom
- Official language: English
- Volunteers: 400
- Website: www.mvs.org.uk

The Maritime Volunteer Service (MVS) is a United Kingdom wide charity.

Prince Michael of Kent is the charity's royal patron and honorary commodore.

== Operations ==
The Maritime Volunteer Service has around 400 members in 27 units around the United Kingdom. The MVS maintains strong links with local authorities, harbour boards, and other maritime organisations.

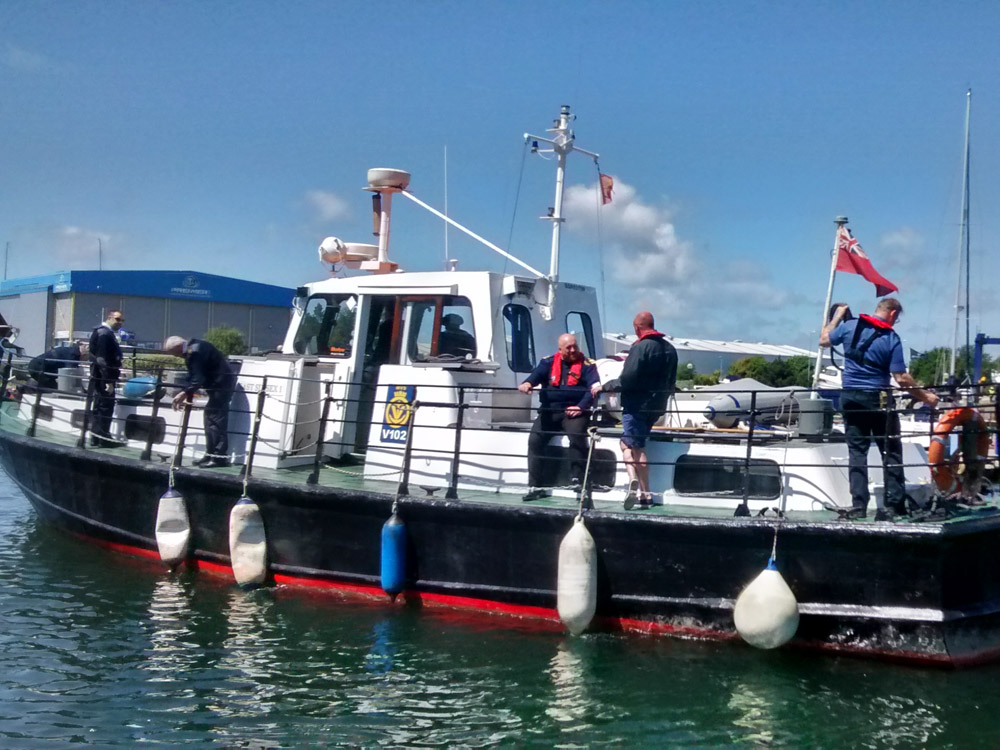
The MVS National Training Vessel East Sussex 1 at Sovereign Harbour in Eastbourne.

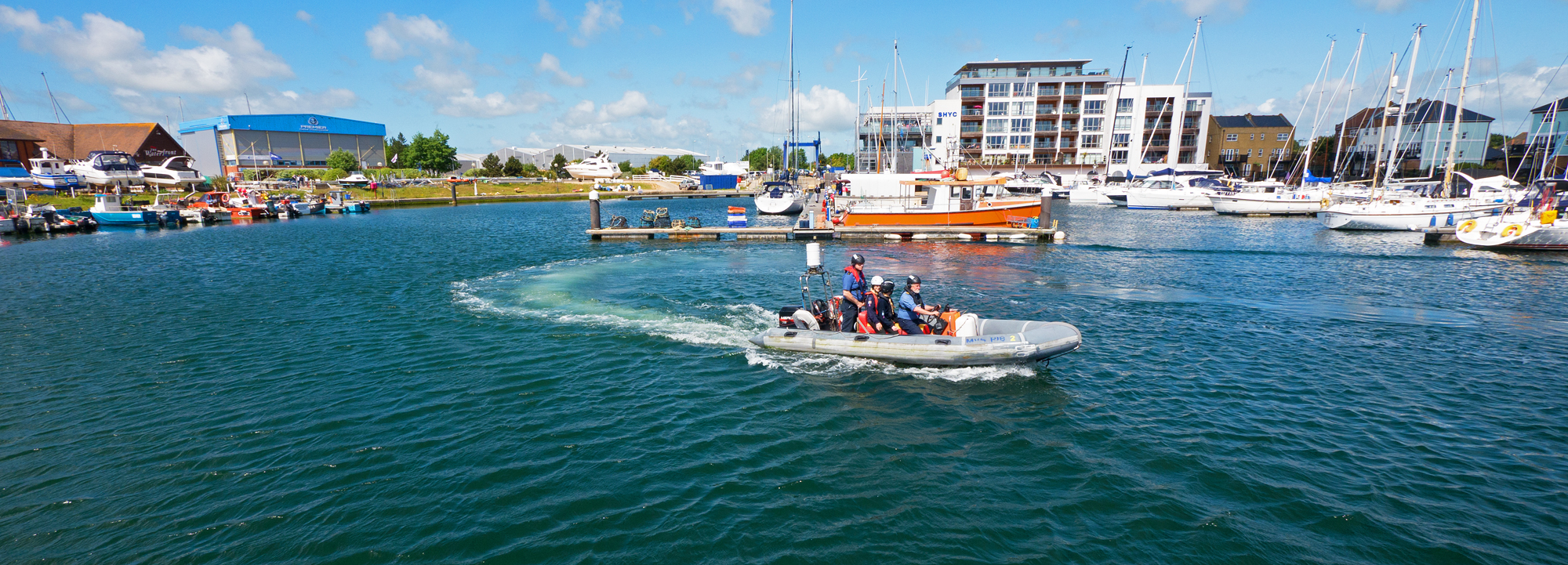
The MVS on the water at Sovereign Harbour in Eastbourne.

== History ==
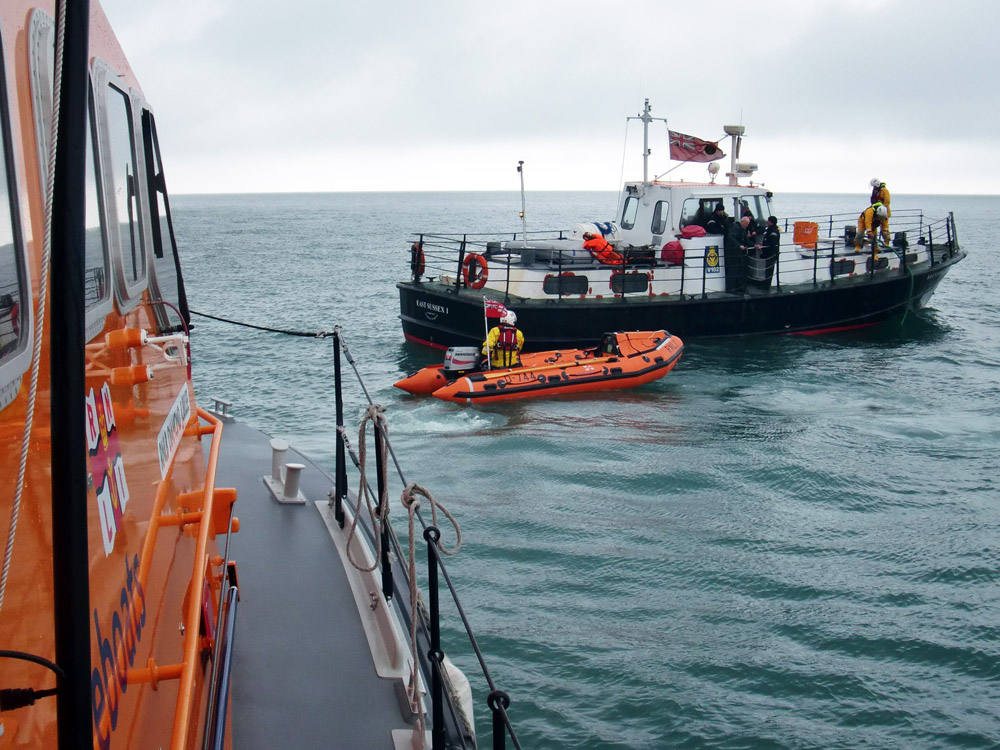
The MVS and RNLI on a joint exercise in Sussex.

The MVS was formed on 1 April 1994, a day after the Royal Naval Auxiliary Service (RNXS) was disbanded. The RNXS had operated small ships such as fleet tenders and inshore minesweepers, and ran Naval Control of Shipping centres ashore, but was disbanded following the end of the Cold War. While many of the best aspects of RNXS operating procedures and traditions survive in the MVS, it is a uniformed civilian charity whose vessels fly a defaced Red Ensign. On 7 May 1997, the then Armed Forces Minister, Dr John Reid, announced during a visit to the Britannia Royal Naval College, Dartmouth that the Royal Navy would give formal recognition to the Maritime Volunteer Service. In his remarks, he said that the Royal Navy's recognition is a tribute to the important role that the MVS play in the education and training of young people in nautical skills.

On 2 September 1998, a Warrant was issued giving permission for the MVS to wear a Red Ensign bearing the Service's "V" and "Anchor" logo and naval crown. The logo was designed by Commander Bruce Nicholls OBE RN, and this is only the thirty-fifth designed Red Ensign approved for use worldwide. Of that total six are flown by UK public institutions such as Trinity House, the RNLI and the Scout Association, six by dependent territories and five by Commonwealth countries and provinces. The remainder have been granted to privileged yacht clubs around the world. The MVS Ensign accurately reflects the Service's aims in promoting maritime skills amongst local communities in ports and harbours around Britain's coast.

MVS had a supporting role during the 2012 Summer Olympics, when its London Units were involved in an extended deployment as part of the Environment Agency's security operation for the Olympic Rowing and Kayak Sprint events held at Eton Dorney Lake. The City of London Unit's Nelson 45 launch, Londinium 1, and three RIBs were based at Boveney Lock on the non-tidal Thames for two weeks.

The MVS also assisted Weymouth Harbour Authority during the Olympics. Poole Unit's ex-Customs launch, Avocet, and RIBs from Portsmouth, Christchurch, Bournemouth, Weymouth, and Portland Units worked to the Weymouth Harbour Master's instructions, patrolling the port's busy anchorages and approaches. The MVS's national training vessel East Sussex 1 sailed to Weymouth to act as a floating hotel and control centre for the crews of the other craft. The MVS's work supporting the Olympics was one of the major factors that led to it receiving the Queen's Diamond Jubilee Volunteering Award 2012.

In 2014 the MVS marked its 20th anniversary at an official dinner in Portsmouth, where the guest of honour was Vice-Admiral Sir Alan Massey KCB, CBE, Chief Executive of the Maritime and Coastguard Agency.

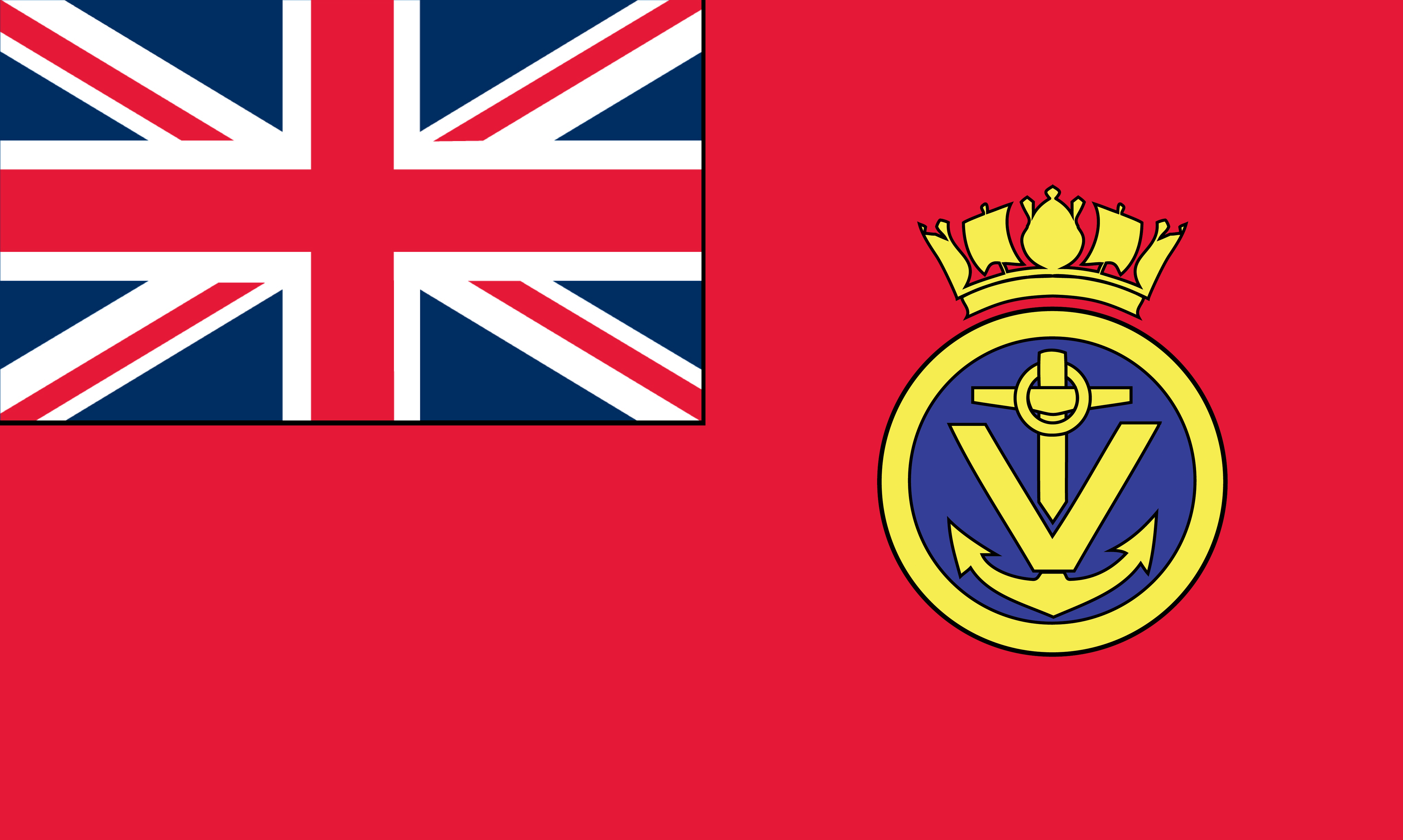
The MVS Defaced Ensign
