= Royal Naval Minewatching Service =

Civilian organization part of auxiliary forces of the British Naval Service

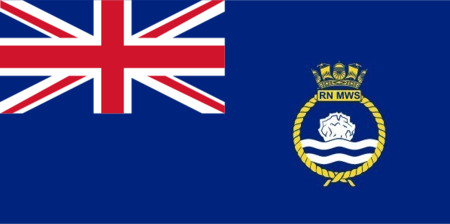
Ensign of Royal Naval Mine Watching Service, 1954–1962

The Royal Naval Mine Watching Service was a civilian organisation formed in 1952 as part of the auxiliary forces of the British Naval Service.

Its intended wartime role was to man observation points overlooking ports and strategic waterways, in order to report mines dropped by aircraft.

The service came into existence early in 1952 when nearly 3,000 men and women enrolled for duty in an emergency.

In 1962 the service was amalgamated with the Admiralty Ferry Crews Association, to become the Royal Naval Auxiliary Service (R.N.X.S). The flag inscription was altered from "RN MWS" to "RNXS" to reflect that name change.

== Mine Watchers – The Navy's Home Guard ==
Mine watching was described as a task of vital national importance; in a debate on defence in the House of Commons in March 1952, Winston Churchill pointed out that the Royal Navy had three main threats to meet in the event of war: the mine, the U-boat, and the threat from the air.

Churchill also emphasised the threat of the aerially laid mine in coastal waters and much thought was being devoted to the problem in high places. "It is therefore fitting that we should Salute the Mine watching Service as Her Majesty the Queen recently did by approving a uniform to be worn by members of the Service. This uniform, comprising a beret with specially designed badge, a greatcoat with shoulder flash bearing the initials "R.N.M.W.S." and battledress (with either skirt or trousers for women watchers) should do much to improve the standing of the Service and extend recruitment".

He welcomed the R.N.M.W.S. composed of men and women in civilian life and said it "might well be as valuable to the Royal Navy and to the life of the Island as our sailors afloat."

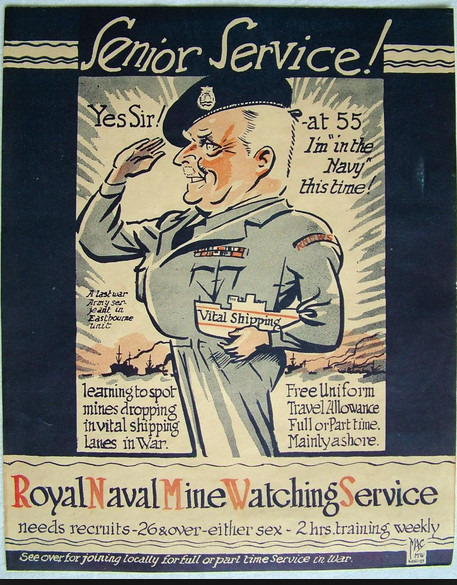
RNMWS Recruiting poster 1 circa 1953

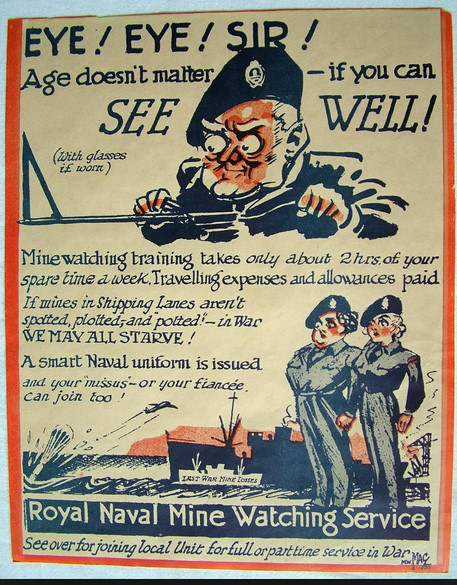
RNMWS Recruiting poster 2 circa 1953

The Royal Naval Mine watching Service, was designed as an integral part of British mine countermeasures.

The service was a civilian one, operated and administered by the Royal Navy under the overall direction of the Admiralty. Its members were volunteers of either sex of the age of 26 or more, normally British subjects, who are trained at centres near their homes and were willing to serve on a full-time or part-time basis in the event of emergency. They must live near the coast or the principal rivers or waterways.

They were provided with a free uniform, besides being repaid their fares to their training centres and an allowance for each exercise or instructional period. In the Port of London alone there are six such training centres, and for administrative purposes the United Kingdom is divided up into four main areas under the Naval Commanders-in-Chief at Portsmouth, Plymouth and the Nore, and the Flag Officer Scotland, each of whom has a Command Mine watching Service Officer. There are Port M.W.S.O.s in the various ports or areas with Section Officers, Chief Mine watchers, Leading Mine watchers and Mine watchers working under them.

The R.N.M.W.S. was responsible for manning posts, provided with equipment, all round the coasts of the United Kingdom and along every navigable river and waterway, to spot the mines as they drop, to record and report their positions, so that the traffic lanes may be kept open for the safe passage of the shipping upon which our very existence depends.

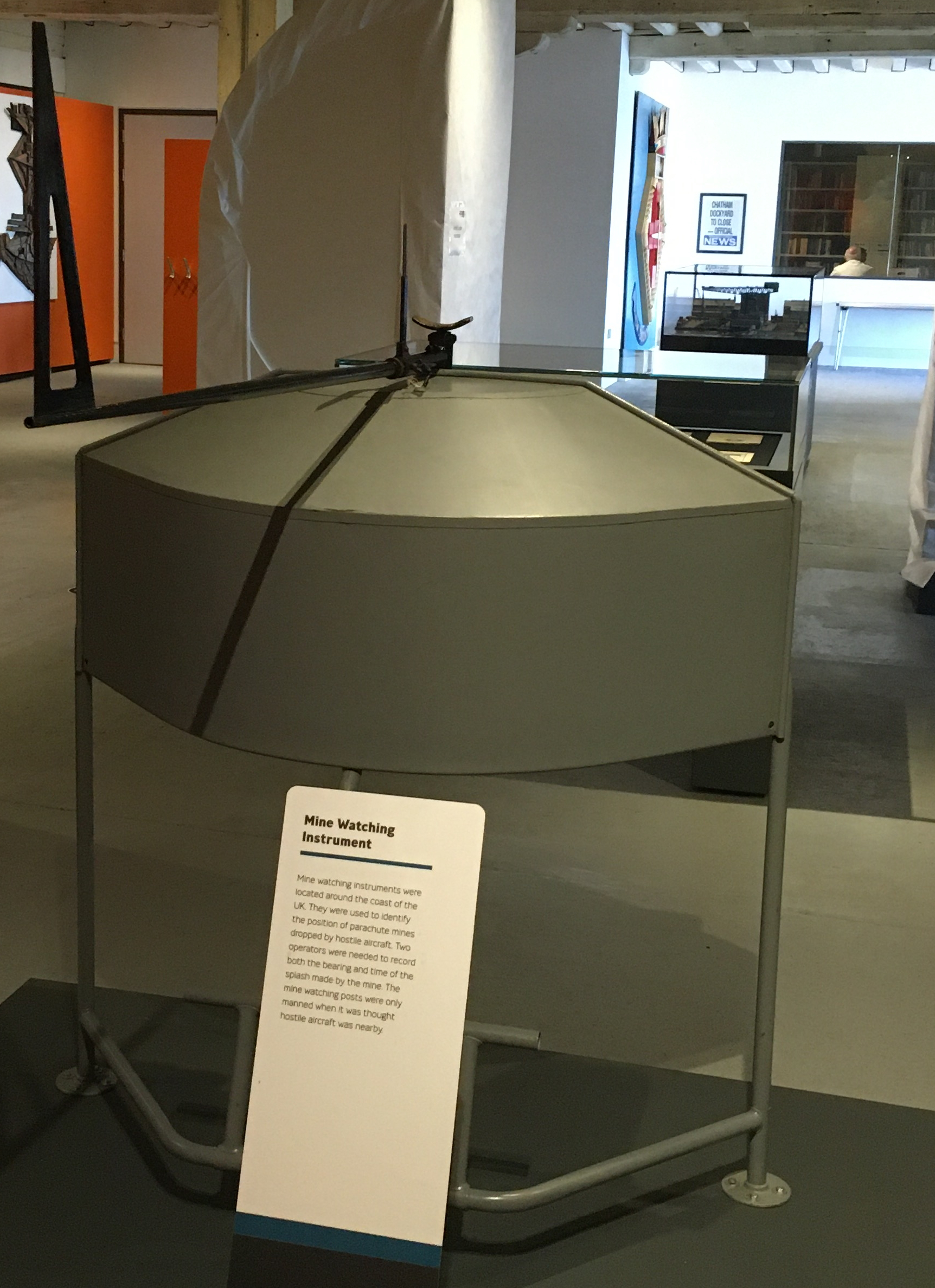
A RNMWS minewatching sight at Chatham Historic Dockyard.

In 1962, it was transformed into the Royal Naval Auxiliary Service, intended as a short-notice response force to help disperse shipping in British ports in case of a nuclear strike.

== Ensign ==
The ensign of the Royal Naval Mine Watching Service was granted in 1953 by royal warrant. Designs were submitted as watercolours and those which were approved were passed to the College of Arms for a ’Sealed Pattern’ to be made for the Admiralty. A circular yellow cable surmounted by Naval Crown and panel inscribed RNMWS enclosing mine exploding in Heraldic Sea against a blue background, was selected.

== Sources ==
- Whitaker's Almanack: for the year 1958, p. 470. J. Whitaker & Sons, London, 1957
