= Fleet tender =

Fleet tenders were British merchant ships fitted with a wooden superstructure to resemble battleships or aircraft carriers during the Second World War. They were built to fool German reconnaissance planes, and known as fleet tenders to conceal their purpose.

Three ships were converted in 1939 and another, HMS Centurion, in 1941. The three converted in 1939 were 7,900-tons merchant ships:

- SS Pakeha, fleet tender A, as battleship HMS Revenge
- SS Waimana, fleet tender B, as battleship HMS Resolution
- SS Mamari, fleet tender C, as carrier HMS Hermes

They had been the oldest ships in service with the Shaw, Savill & Albion Line. After conversion, they were initially anchored at Scapa Flow. Major warships had been kept away from the anchorage following the loss of HMS Royal Oak in October 1939 when German submarine U-47 penetrated the harbour defences. After the fleet tenders were improved, they were used as decoys before the first capital ships returned in March 1940. In August 1940, the Commander-in-Chief Home Fleet, Admiral Charles Forbes, ordered them relocated to Rosyth where they were maintained on a "care and maintenance" basis. The three ships never left the home waters of the United Kingdom, and became obsolete in 1941. SS Mamari was wrecked off The Wash and then attacked by German torpedo boats. SS Pakeha and SS Waimana were converted back to merchants and returned to cargo use, but renamed the Empire Pakeha and Empire Waimana under the Ministry of War Transport.

HMS Centurion was a First World War-era battleship, disarmed under the Washington Naval Treaty. In September 1940, when acting as a repair ship at Devonport Naval Base, she was fitted with wooden turrets and guns following a report on the planned Operation Sealion by the German Naval Group West that two British battleships were close to the invasion routes, when in fact there was only one. In May 1941 she was given a more detailed conversion and fitted with a dummy after-funnel, mainmast and main armament to resemble the modern HMS Anson. She left home waters to sail around the Cape of Good Hope to Bombay, and in June 1942 acted as a decoy in a convoy to Malta (Operation Vigorous). She was finally expended in June 1944 as a blockship off the Normandy coast as part of the Gooseberry shelter for Omaha Beach.

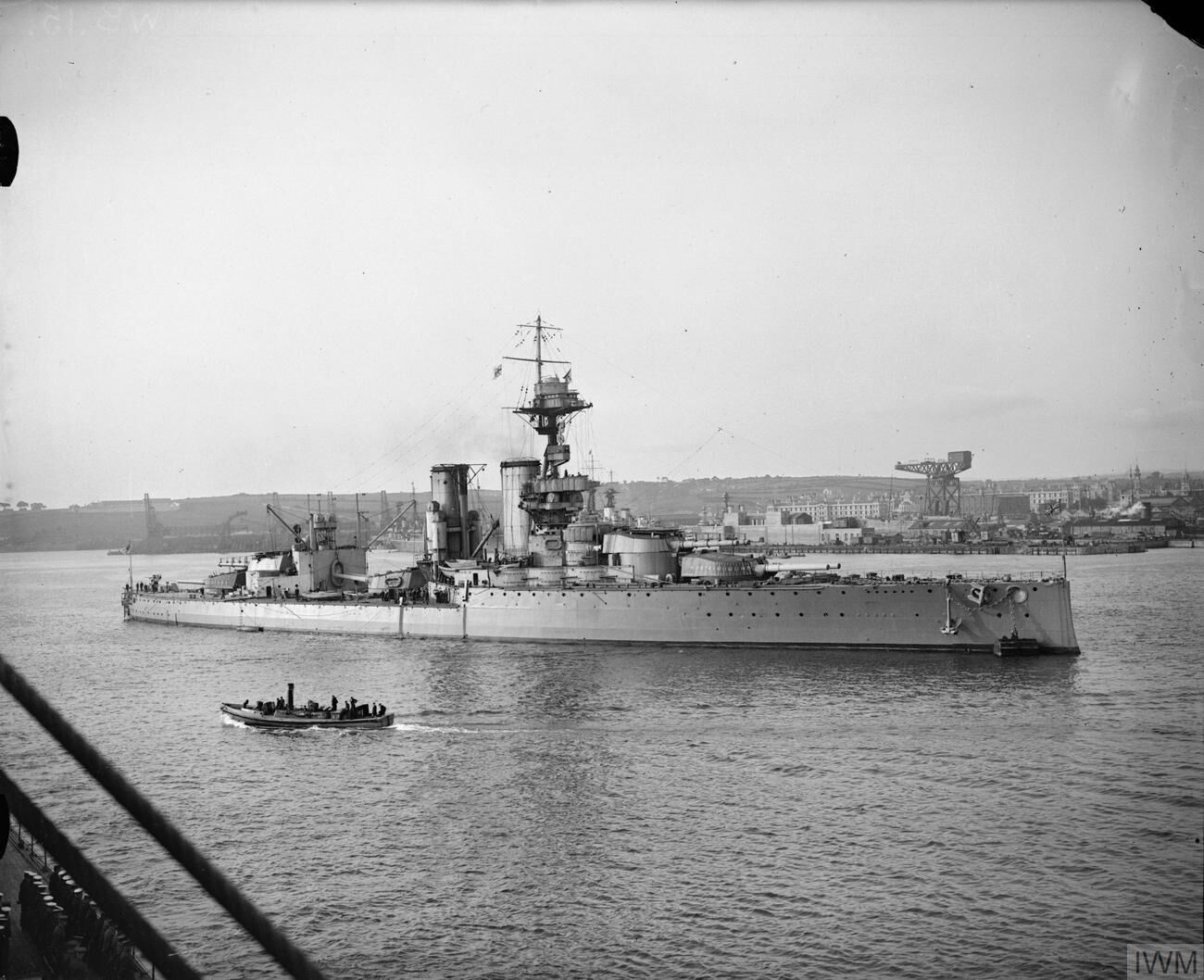
HMS Centurion in 1918

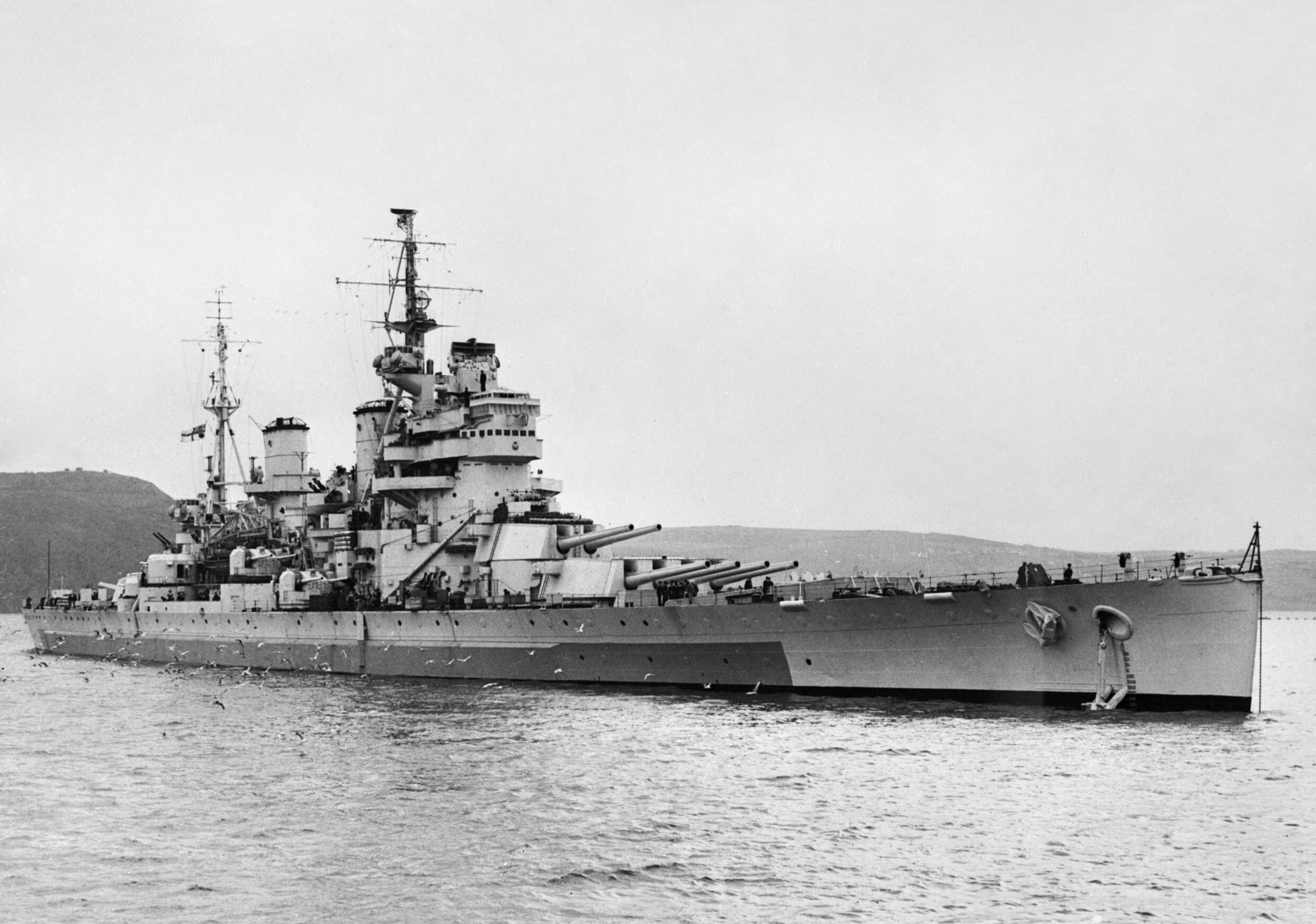
HMS Anson in 1945

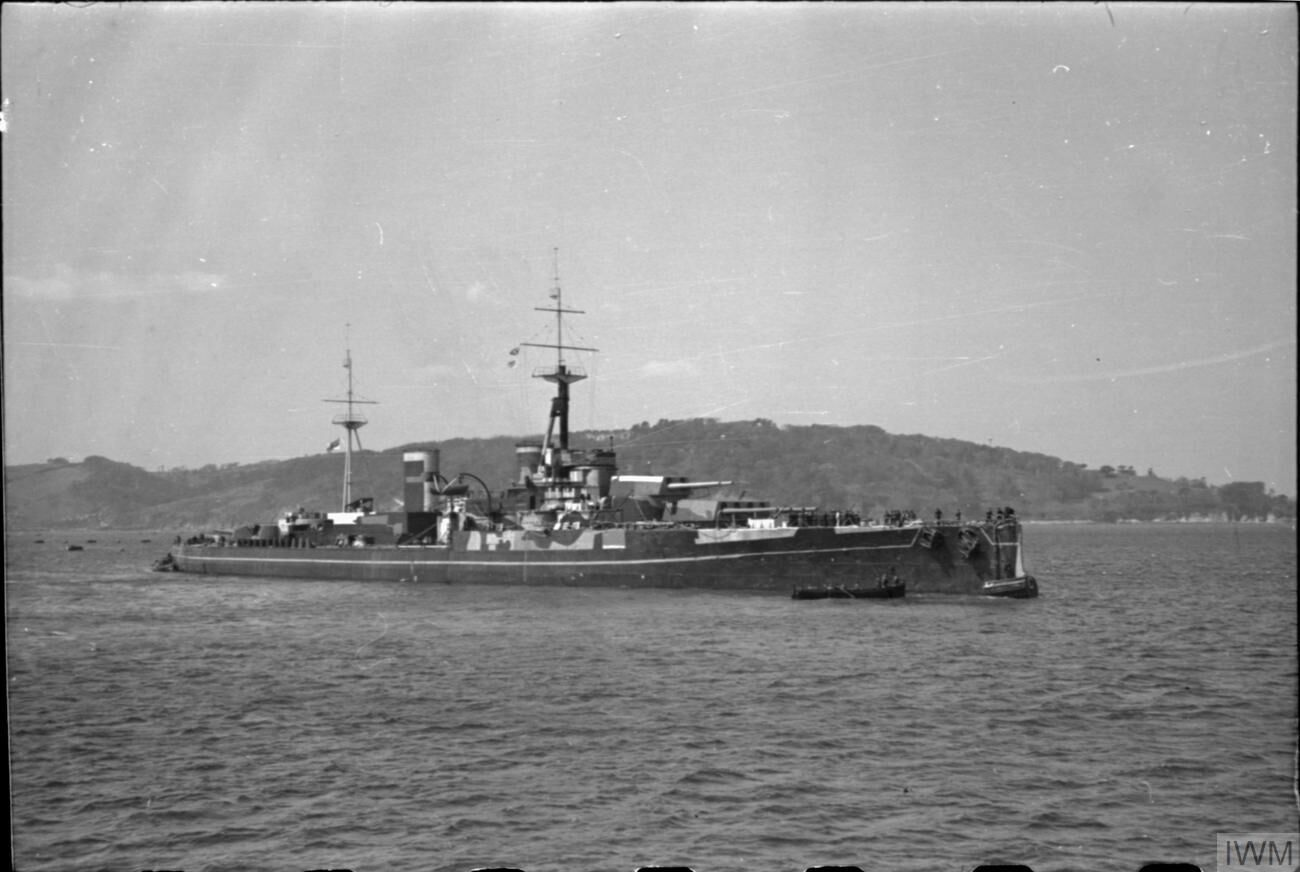
HMS Centurion masquerading as HMS Anson
