= Derrynane RNLI Lifeboat Station =

Former RNLI lifeboat station in County Kerry, Ireland

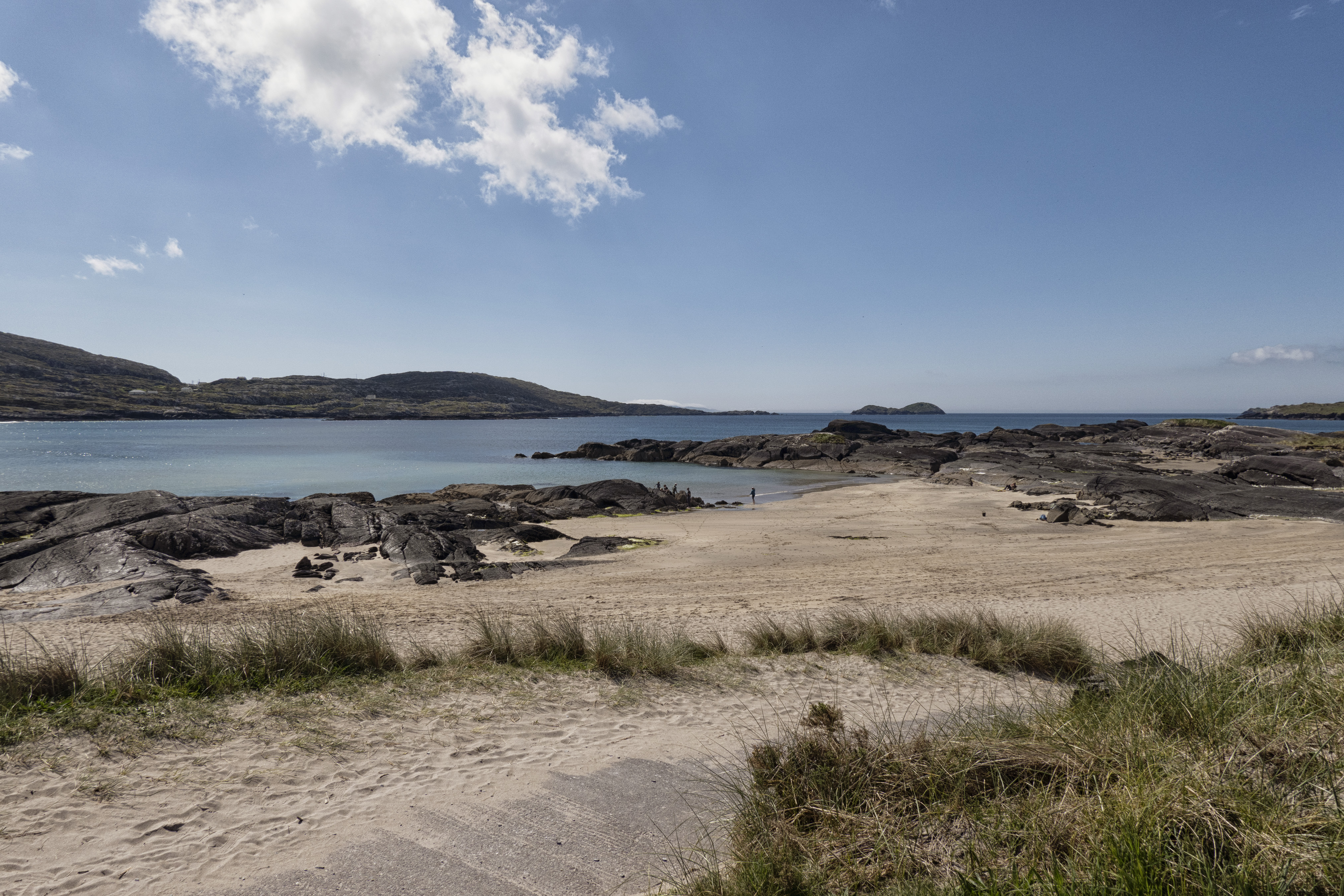
- Derrynane Beach

- Derrynane, County Kerry

General information
- Status: Closed
- Type: RNLI Lifeboat Station
- Location: Derrynane Beach, Derrynane, County Kerry, Ireland
- Coordinates: 51°45′38.2″N 10°08′34.9″W
- Opened: 1844 – 1855

Derrynane RNLI Lifeboat Station was located at Derrynane Beach, on the Iveragh peninsula, approximately 70 km (43 mi) south-west of Killarney in County Kerry, on the south-west coast of Ireland.

A lifeboat station was first established at Derrynane in 1844 by the Royal National Institute for the Preservation of Life from Shipwreck (RNIPLS).

The RNIPLS became the Royal National Lifeboat Institution (RNLI) in 1854, but after just 11 years in operation, Derrynane Lifeboat Station closed the following year in 1855.

An independent lifeboat station, Derrynane Inshore Rescue was established at Derrynane in the 1990s.

== History ==
The establishment of the original lifeboat station at Derrynane was perhaps more political, than for any other reasons.

Mr George Palmer, (1772–1853) was the son of East India merchant William Palmer, and spent his early years working through the ranks on his father's ships. In 1788, Palmer spent three days clinging to an upturned ship's boat, after it capsized. He would later study how to make such a boat unsinkable. In 1826, he joined the recently formed RNIPLS, and would be instrumental in designing the Palmer-class lifeboat.

Palmer became the MP for South Essex in 1836, where he campaigned for the restriction on Timber trading ships carrying cargo above deck, resulting in the "Timber Ships, British North America Act 1840", the "Timber Ships, America Act 1842", and finally the "Timber Ships Act 1845".

One of Palmer's main adversaries in parliament was Daniel O'Connell MP, who despite agreeing with him this time on the subject of timber ships, joked that he had done very well from the many wrecks of timber vessels on the coast of his land in County Kerry.

It was announced that a lifeboat station was to be established on that same coast, at Derrynane. A fine boathouse had been constructed at Derrynane Beach, and an unnamed 26-foot 5-oared Palmer-class lifeboat was dispatched to the station, arriving in 1844.

No records have been found of any further activity, service or rescue at the station. Other than detail from RNLI records giving the dates of operation, via the Lifeboat Enthusiasts Society handbook, there are also no details available about the closure, or the reasons. After just 11 years, Derrynane closed in 1855, just one year after the RNIPLS became the RNLI.

The lifeboat was withdrawn from service and broken up. The lifeboat house still stands, and is now a private residence.

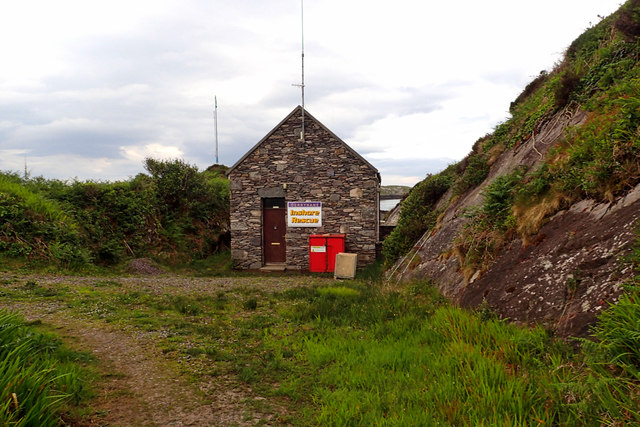
Derrynane Inshore Rescue

In 1990, the loss of a father and son in a boating accident sparked the demand for a local lifeboat. Derrynane Inshore Rescue was established. The rescue service currently operates a 7 m (23 ft) Rigid inflatable boat (RIB), Aghamore II, with twin 115-hp Yamaha engines, delivering a speed of 42 knots. The boat is a declared asset with the Irish Coast Guard. The lifeboat operates from a boathouse just along the coast from the old 1844 boathouse.

For further information on the new service, please see:–

- Derrynane Inshore Rescue

== Derrynane RNLI lifeboat ==
ON (Note: ON is the RNLI's Official Number of the boat.)	Name	Built	On station	Class	Comments
Pre-197	Unnamed	1840	1844–1855	26-foot Palmer	(Note: 26-foot x 6-foot 9in (5-oared) lifeboat, built by Taylor of Blackwall, London, costing £77.)

Station Closed, 1862

Pre ON numbers are unofficial numbers used by the Lifeboat Enthusiast Society to reference early lifeboats not included on the official RNLI list.

== See also ==
- Independent lifeboats in Britain and Ireland
- List of RNLI stations
- List of former RNLI stations
- Royal National Lifeboat Institution lifeboats
