= Shropshire Fire and Rescue Service =

Statutory fire and rescue service

Operational area
- Country: England
- County: Shropshire

Agency overview
- Established: 1948
- Employees: 645
- Chief Fire Officer: Simon Hardiman
- Motto: Putting Shropshire's Safety First

Website
- www.shropshirefire.gov.uk

The Shropshire Fire and Rescue Service is the statutory fire and rescue service covering Shropshire, including Telford and Wrekin, in the West Midlands region of England.

Shropshire's Fire and Rescue Service is provided by 512 full-time and retained firefighters based at 23 fire stations around the county.

== Organisation and management ==
=== Fire Authority ===
Shropshire Fire and Rescue Service is governed by elected Council representatives from Shropshire's two unitary councils, Shropshire Council and Telford and Wrekin Council. Together these representatives make up the Shropshire and Wrekin Fire Authority, chaired by an elected councillor.

Day-to-day operational control of the service is vested in a chief fire officer, Rod Hammerton.

=== Executive control ===
Within the organisation the chief fire officer has full responsibility for the service and also manages finance and resources.

The remainder of executive duties fall to the senior management team, consisting of and assistant chief fire officer with responsibility for service delivery and an assistant chief fire officer with responsibility for corporate services.

== Performance ==
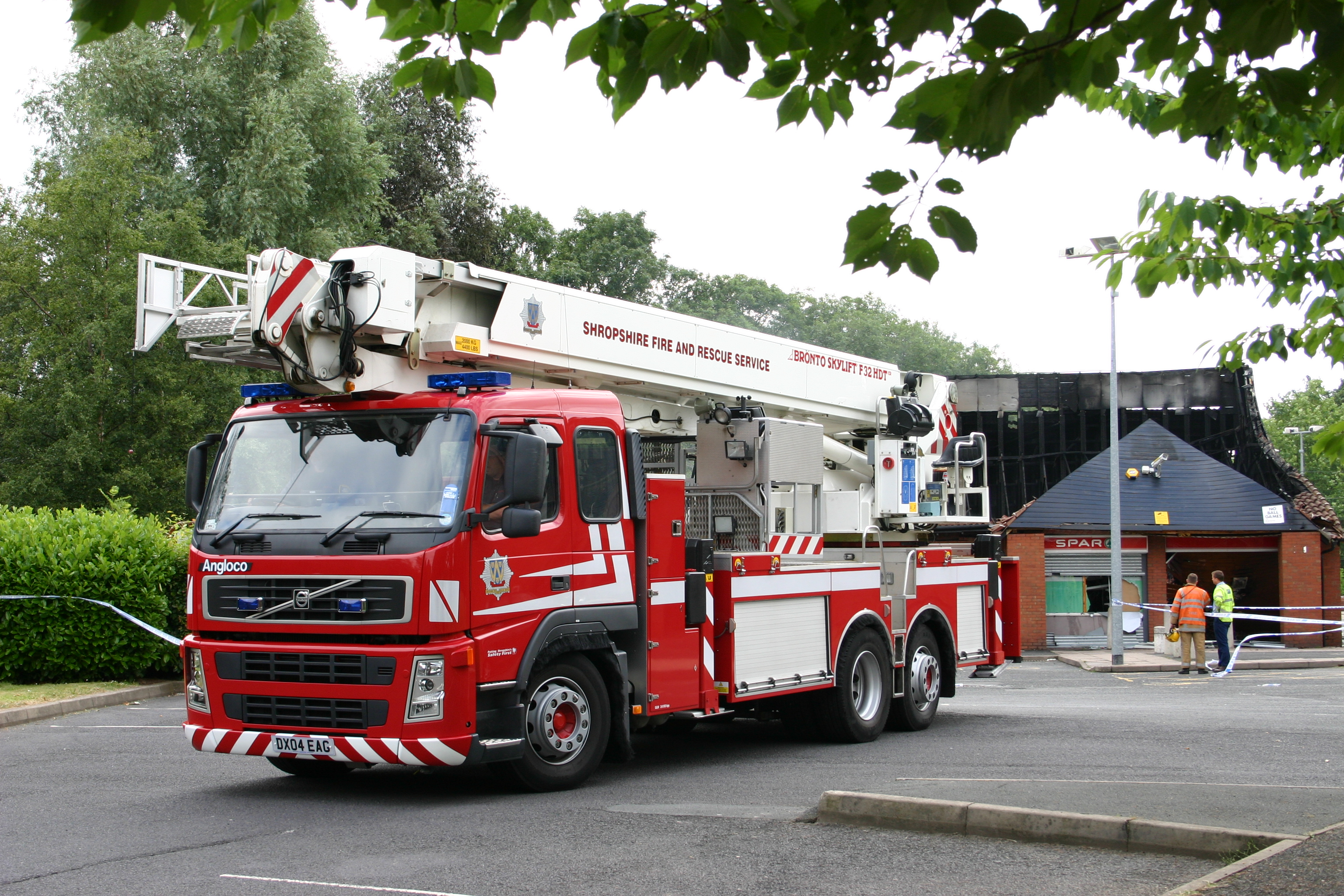
An aerial appliance of the Shropshire Fire & Rescue Service

Shropshire Fire and Rescue Service has achieved consistently high marks in external audits carried out by the Audit Commission.

Every fire and rescue service in England and Wales is periodically subjected to a statutory inspection by His Majesty's Inspectorate of Constabulary and Fire & Rescue Services (HMICFRS). The inspections investigate how well the service performs in each of three areas. On a scale of outstanding, good, requires improvement and inadequate, Shropshire Fire and Rescue Service was rated as follows:

HMICFRS Inspection Shropshire
Area	Rating 2018/19	Rating 2021/22	Description
Effectiveness	Good	Good	How effective is the fire and rescue service at keeping people safe and secure from fire and other risks?
Efficiency	Good	Good	How efficient is the fire and rescue service at keeping people safe and secure from fire and other risks?
People	Good	Good	How well does the fire and rescue service look after its people?

== Notable incidents ==
- 24 June 1983 – a fire at the MOD Donnington army ordnance depot in Telford took 140 firefighters to bring under control.
- 26 April 2021 - 24 May 2021 - a fire at Greenway Polymers that took 70 firefighters to bring under control at its height and wasn’t fully extinguished for 28 days, requiring a rotation of nearly a thousand firefighters across the course of a month.

== See also ==
- Hereford and Worcester Fire and Rescue Service
- West Mercia Police
- West Mercia Search and Rescue
- West Midlands Ambulance Service
- List of British firefighters killed in the line of duty
