= Ryde Lifeboat Station =

Former RNLI lifeboat station on the Isle of Wight, UK

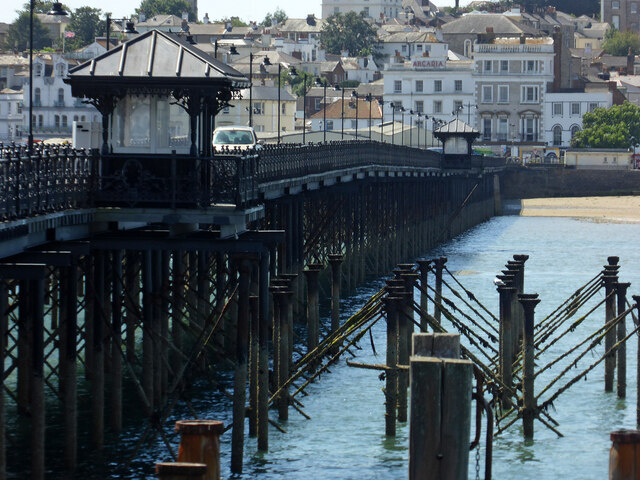
- Location of former Lifeboat House, Ryde Pier

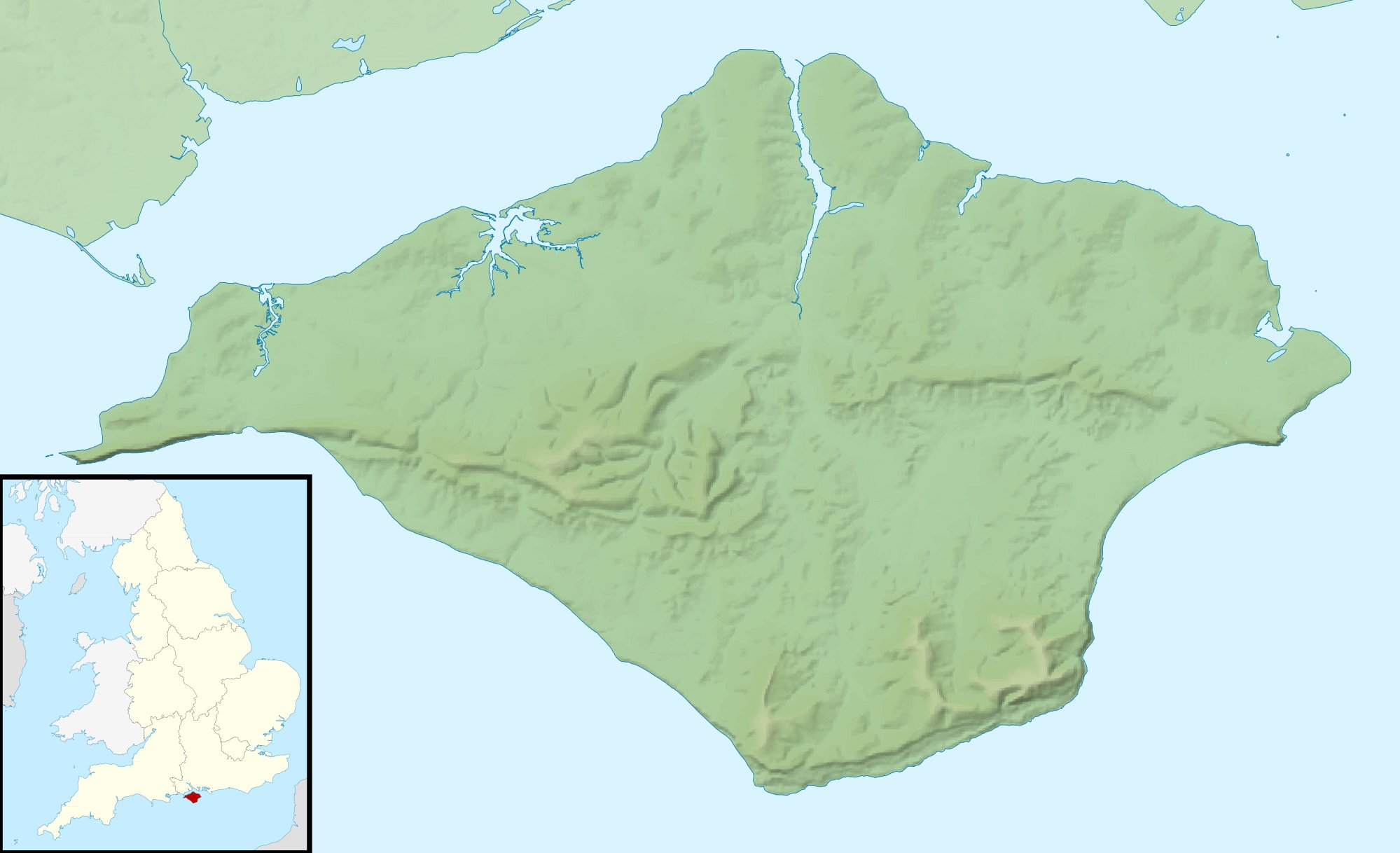
- Location within Isle of Wight

General information
- Status: Closed
- Type: RNLI Lifeboat Station
- Location: The Pier, Ryde, Isle of Wight, England
- Coordinates: 50°44′15.8″N 1°09′40.3″W
- Opened: 1858
- Closed: 1923

Ryde Lifeboat Station, was located at Ryde Pier, in the town of Ryde, on the Isle of Wight, England.

A lifeboat was first placed at Ryde in 1869. Management of the station was transferred to the Royal National Lifeboat Institution (RNLI) in 1894.

Ryde Lifeboat Station was closed in 1923, following the placement of a motor-lifeboat at Bembridge in 1922.

A new Independent Rescue service, Ryde Inshore Rescue Service, was established after a double drowning incident in 1956.

== History ==
The first rescue service in the town started in 1858 and was run on a voluntary basis.

On 8 May 1869, the town's rescue volunteers service were supplied with a new lifeboat. The lifeboat was built by J. Samuel White at Cowes on the Isle of Wight. She was 28 ft 8 in (8.74 m) in length, 6 ft 3 in (1.91 m) across the beam and had a depth of 2 ft 4 in (0.71 m). The lifeboat had 8 oars and she was fitted with two sailing masts. She was steered with a galvanised iron tiller. The lifeboat had its own carriage for launching, or for transportation to alternate locations if the situation required. The lifeboat was the gift of Hans Busk DL, one of the originators of the Volunteer Force, and was named Captain Hans Busk (ON 376).

A boathouse was constructed on the west side of Ryde pier in 1870, from where the lifeboat could be launched down a slipway.

In 1894, at the invitation of the Ryde lifeboat committee, management of the station was transferred to the RNLI. The lifeboat on station, Captain Hans Busk (ON 376) was given a complete overhaul.

The November 1905 edition of the RNLI journal 'The Lifeboat' reported the replacement of the Ryde lifeboat, with a similar 'Whale-boat' design lifeboat, slightly longer than the earlier boat, at 30 ft (9.1 m) in length, built by Thames Ironworks of Blackwall, London, and costing £605. The boat was provided from legacy of Mrs Selina Edwards of Cannock, Staffordshire, and was duly named Selina (ON 551).

=== Tragedy ===
Early on the afternoon of Tuesday, 1 January 1907, Augustus Jarrett, master of the 56-ton barge Jane, reported that their small boat had been stolen. This boat was later seen drifting out to sea with a single occupant. The water was rough and the weather was squally.

Around 17:30 that evening, the Ryde lifeboat Selina was launched to assist, with nine crew, including coxswain William John Bartlett at the helm. By this time it had become dark. Selina was a 30 ft (9 m) wooden whaleboat design non-self-righting lifeboat. The lifeboat searched the area but was unable to locate the small boat.

Weather conditions deteriorated, and around 19:45, a sudden heavy squall capsized the Selina, throwing the crew into cold water, without any way of signalling for help. The lifeboat drifted across the Solent to Southsea on the south coast of the English mainland. Two of the nine crew, Frank Haynes and Henry Heward, died from exposure.

Meanwhile, the small boat belonging to the Jane had managed to row across the Solent, landing opposite Eastney Barracks at Southsea at around 7:00 PM, prior to the capsizing of the Selina. Its occupant turned out to be Augustus Jarrett. Jarrett maintained that the small boat had been stolen and he had later recovered it at the Dover Street Slipway, although later inquiry suggested it may simply have floated away after being poorly secured. An inquest into the accident was held on 4 January 1907. The jury's verdict was that the deaths had been accidental and not the result of negligence.

=== Closure ===
Ryde Lifeboat Station was closed in 1923, following the placement of a motor-lifeboat at Bembridge the previous year. Little evidence of the boathouse remains, just a few iron pilings standing next to the Pier. The lifeboat Selina (ON 551) was sold in 1923, but still survives, and in 2024 was being stored on the Isle of Wight awaiting restoration.

=== Ryde Inshore Rescue Service ===
A double drowning incident at the end of Ryde Pier in 1956, prompted the reformation of a rescue organisation to serve the town, and the creation of Ryde Inshore Rescue Service.

For further information, please see:–

- Ryde Inshore Rescue Service

== Roll of honour ==
In memory of those lost whilst serving Ryde lifeboat.

- Lifeboat Selina (ON 551) capsized, after being launched to the aid of the boat of the barge Jane, 1 January 1907

Frank Haynes (38)
Henry Heward (51)

== Ryde lifeboats ==
ON (Note: ON is the RNLI's Official Number of the boat.)	Name	Built	On station	Class	Comments
376	Captain Hans Busk	1869	1869−1905	28-foot 8in Whaleboat	(Note: 28 ft 8 in (8.74 m) x 6 ft 3 in (1.91 m) (8-oared) non-self-righting 'Whale-boat', gift of the Capt. Hans Busk LB fund, built by J. Samuel White of Cowes.)
551	Selina	1905	1905−1923	30-foot Whaleboat	(Note: 30 ft (9.1 m) x 7 ft 3 in (2.21 m) (8-oared) non-self-righting 'Whale-boat', legacy of Mrs S. Edwards of Cannock, built by Thames Ironworks of Blackwall, London, costing £605.); Capsized 1 January 1907. Sold 1923, now stored on the Isle of Wight pending restoration (December 2024).

== See also ==
- List of RNLI stations
- List of former RNLI stations
- Independent lifeboats in Britain and Ireland
