= Bay Search and Rescue =

Search and rescue service in Cumbria, England

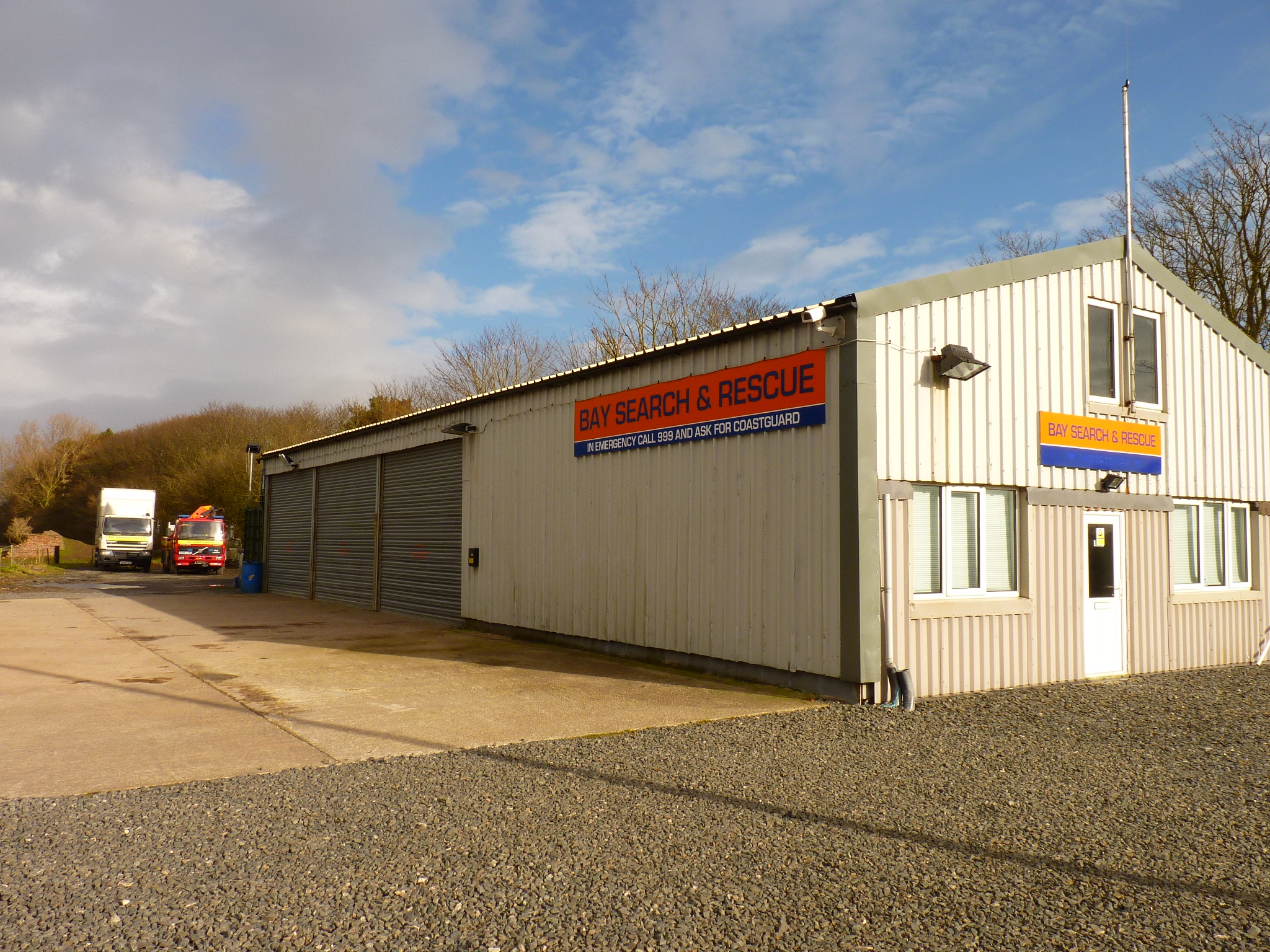
- Bay Search and Rescue

- Flookburgh, Cumbria
- Former names: Bay Hovercraft Rescue

General information
- Type: Marine Rescue Center
- Location: Moor Lane,, Flookburgh, Cumbria, LA11 7LT, United Kingdom
- Coordinates: 54°09′35.8″N 2°58′03.8″W
- Opened: 1999

Website
- Bay Search and Rescue

Bay Search and Rescue (BSAR) , formerly 'Bay Hovercraft Rescue' (BHR), is located at an operational base on Moor Lane in Flookburgh, a village on the Cartmel Peninsula, overlooking Morecambe Bay, on the south coast of Cumbria. The service has an administrative base at Milnthorpe.

This voluntary independent search and rescue (SAR) service was established in 1999, and was set up to rescue people in difficulty, in the large expanse of unpredictable mud flats and quicksand of Morecambe Bay.

Bay Search and Rescue primarily operates three Hägglund BV206 All-terrain vehicles, originally designed for use in the Arctic by the Swedish Army, manufactured by Hägglunds Vehicle AB, two Arancia A380 inflatable rescue boats, and a custom designed SAR Airboat.

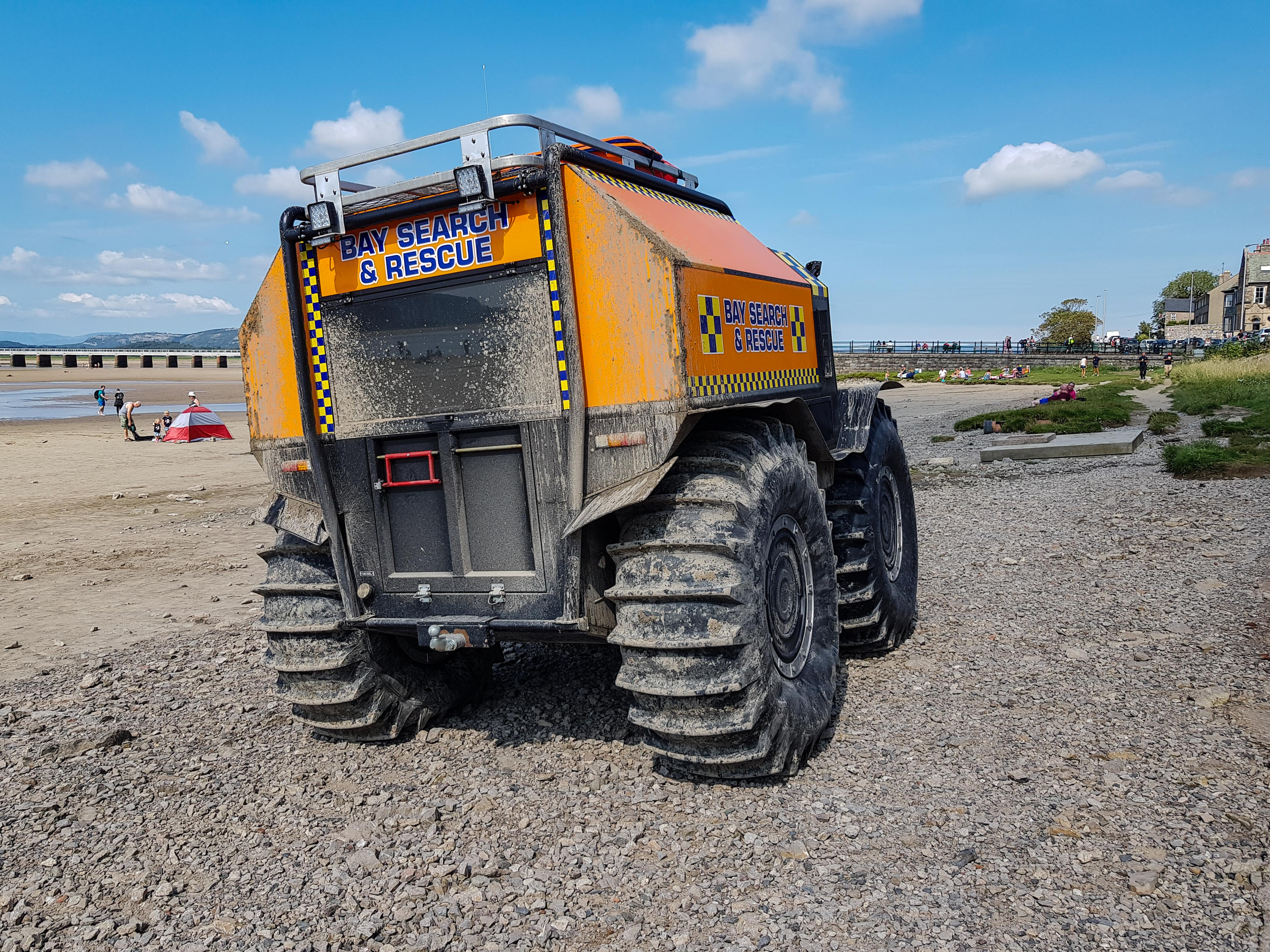
Sherp All-terrain vehicle

BSAR became a registered charity in 2001 (No. 1090880), and is a member of the National Independent Lifeboats Association (NILA).

== History ==
Morecambe Bay is an estuary in north-west England, sitting just to the south of the Lake District National Park. The mud flats, the largest in the United Kingdom, cover an area of approximately 120 sq mi (310 km^{2}), and are the remains of sandur resulting from the last Ice age.

For many centuries, with the tide recessing 9 miles (14 km) at low tide, the main route into the southern Lake District was across the sand. However, with extremely fast incoming tides, and the presence of quicksand, great care must be taken when making a crossing. An official guide holds the post of King's Guide to the Sands.

Bay Hovercraft Rescue was established after two coastguards, Gary Parsons and Adrian Swenson, were involved in a particularly difficult rescue. A man, trapped in the mud for over 10 hours overnight, only narrowly avoided drowning, following the combined efforts of 32 rescue personnel. In time-critical circumstances, the rescue was hindered as all equipment needed to be carried to the casualty by hand.

Following a visit to a hovercraft race, Parsons acquired an old race hovercraft, which was ideal for travelling over sand at speed. A journey over the sand which previously took 3 hours on foot, was now achieved in 12 minutes. The hovercraft was named Ada Hillard, after a local major benefactor, and a base was found at an old wartime fire station at Abbot Hall Hotel, Kents Bank.

The dangers of the area were clearly demonstrated on the 5 February 2004 with the Morecambe Bay cockling disaster. At least 21 illegal immigrants from China were drowned by an incoming tide, after being cut off while harvesting cockles. Reports vary, but a further 10–15 people survived the incident. Using the hovercraft, the BHR team spent 8-10 hours searching for survivors. The pilot and co-pilot became hypothermic despite wearing clothing appropriate for the conditions. The event would result in the criminal prosecution of the gangmaster and his associates.

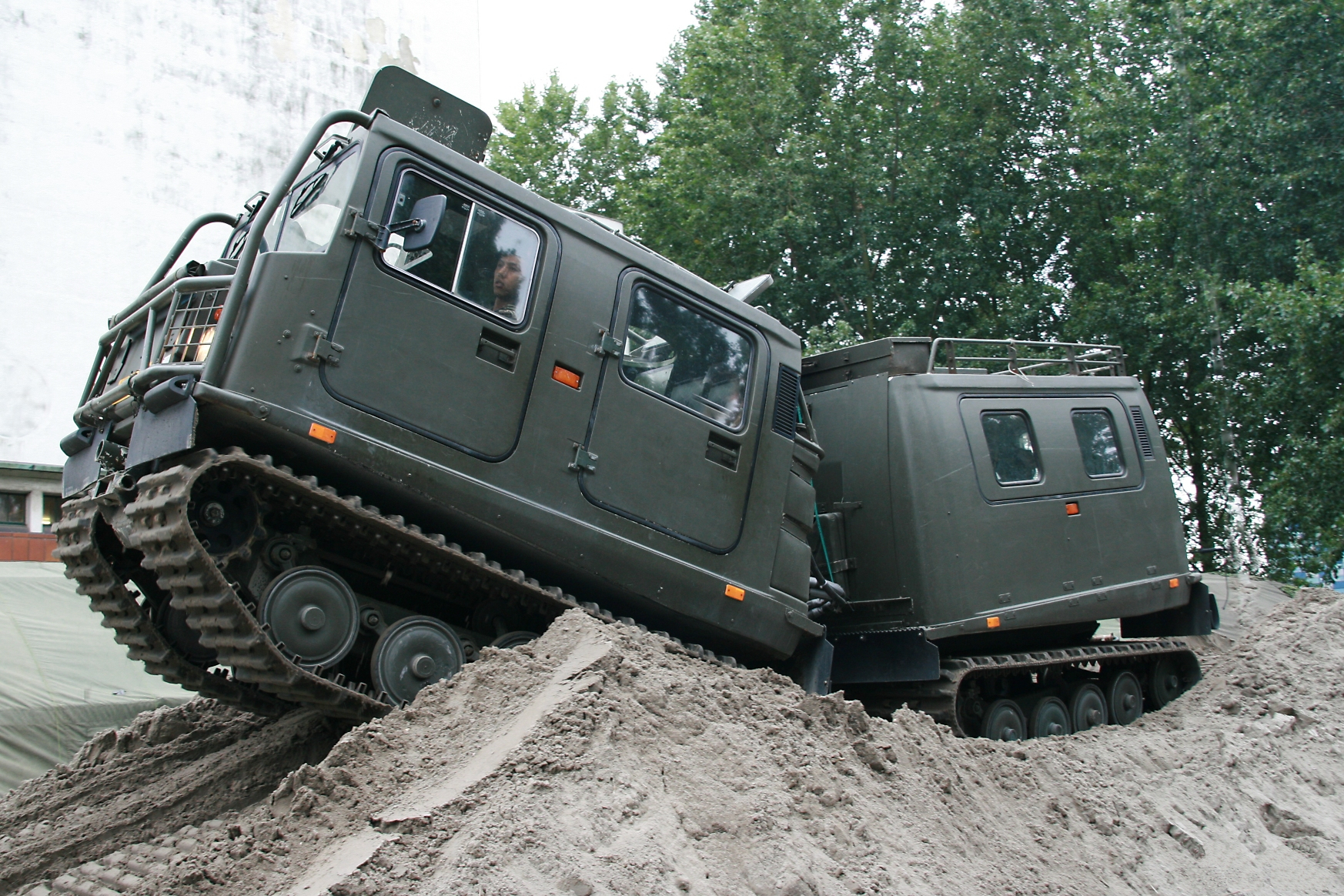
Hagglund BV-206

As the service developed, a hovercraft wasn't entirely ideal, as it couldn't transport sufficient equipment, and had limited capacity for casualties. BSAR now operates three variations of the Hägglund BV 206 All-terrain vehicle, along with various support and logistics vehicles. Additional equipment includes two Arancia A380 inflatable rescue boats. The service was renamed "Bay Search and Rescue".

In order to provide faster response times, at times, the Hägglund BV206 vehicles have been placed at various locations around Cumbria. In 2012, one was placed at Bolton-le-Sands Fire Station, moving to Arnside in 2015. Another unit was stationed near Penrith in 2013.

In 2014, BSAR introduced their custom designed SAR Airboat, similar to those used by US Coastguard, which can operate in less than 1 in (25 mm) of water.

New shore facilities were constructed on Moor Lane in Flookburgh, on a site granted by Lord Cavendish of Holker Hall.

In 2024, BSAR had 20 operational volunteers, and up to 60 in total. With this team of highly trained volunteers, BSAR is able to offer additional rescue services both on the coast and inland, and works closely with both Cumbria and Lancashire Fire and Rescue Service. BSAR were involved in the Cockermouth flooding event of 2009, and helping with moorland fires on Saddleworth Moor in 2018.

== See also ==
- Independent lifeboats in Britain and Ireland
