= Independent lifeboats in Britain and Ireland =

List of lifeboat services in Britain and Ireland

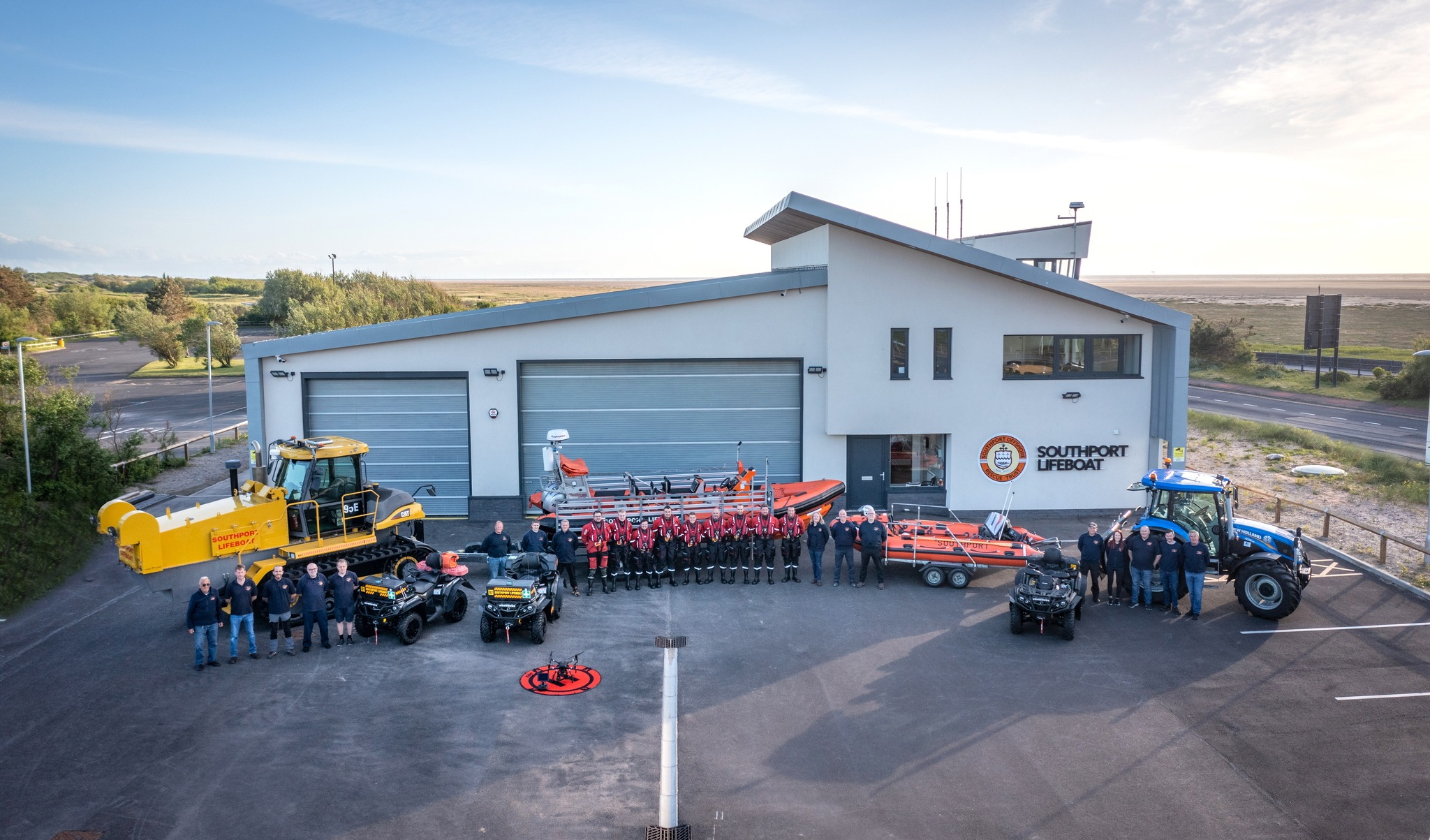
Southport Lifeboat Station

Independent lifeboats in Britain and Ireland is a list of lifeboat services which are not part of the Royal National Lifeboat Institution (RNLI) (established 1854), or its predecessor, the Royal National Institution for the Preservation of Life from Shipwreck (RNIPLS) (established 1824), even though the RNLI is itself independent.

There are about 80 independent lifeboat services operating throughout the United Kingdom, Ireland and the Channel Islands, on coasts and inland waterways, comprising around a quarter of the lifeboat services in the UK and Ireland.

Because the RNLI owns and operates the majority of lifeboat stations, 238 as of 2025,) smaller independent services can be overshadowed when it comes to publicity and fundraising.

Independent services are usually funded privately and most are registered charities; they are supported by amateur radio; most operate 24 hours a day, every day of the year. Some of the independent stations have achieved 'Declared Facility' (DF) status from HM Coastguard, or 'Declared Resource' from Irish Coast Guard, just as they would call on the RNLI.

== History ==
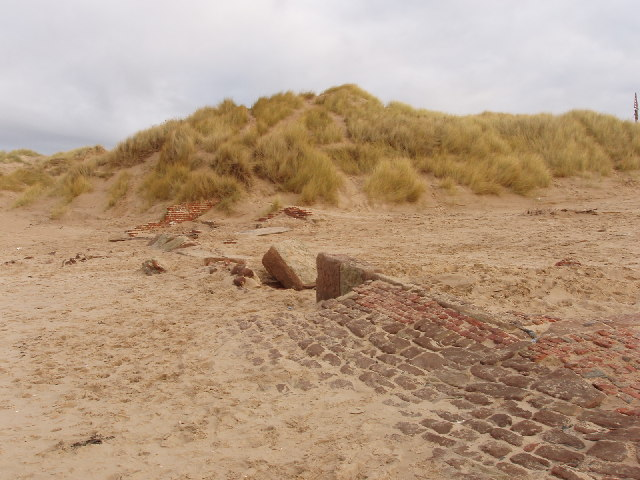
The remains of Formby lifeboat station

The first recorded independent lifeboat service was established in 1776 at Formby, Merseyside, where it could cover the entrance to Liverpool Docks, one of the busiest ports in the world at that time.

More lifeboat stations began to be established around the coast of the British Isles towards the end of the 18th century, in response to the considerable loss of life at sea. Many seaside towns and villages commissioned their own lifeboat, or were part of a larger group, such as the Norfolk Shipwreck Association, or the Essex Lifeboat Association.

In addition, under the Harbours, Docks and Piers Clauses Act 1847, companies operating dock facilities were required by act of parliament to provide a lifeboat.

Inevitably, managing the operations and costs of a lifeboat was not an easy task, nor the first priority of the various Harbour and Dock Companies, and the management of the majority of these lifeboat stations was ultimately transferred to the RNLI.

However, in the early 1900s, a rise in the number of powered vessels, including lifeboats, and a decline in the number of merchant sailing vessels at the mercy of the weather, resulted in a dramatic reduction in the number of wrecks, and the need for lifeboats. Many RNLI stations were closed.

St Abbs Lifeboat Station

In the 1960s, a gradual increasing popularity of coastal and river sport and leisure activities, has led to the reopening of some lifeboat stations, and the establishment of many new ones, both with the RNLI, and independent organisations.

In 1962, the number of rescues or attempted rescues by All-weather RNLI lifeboats in the summer months was 98, with the number of lives rescued being 133. In 1963, in response to an increasing amount of water-based leisure activity, the RNLI began trials of small fast Inshore lifeboats, placed at various locations around the country. These were easily launched with just a few people, ideal to respond quickly to local emergencies. This quickly proved to be very successful. In 1963, there were 226 rescues or attempted rescues in the summer months, as a result of which 225 lives were saved.

Along with new RNLI stations, the number of independent lifeboat stations have increased once again, with many operating in areas not traditionally covered by the RNLI, such as river estuaries and inland waterways, or established where a local need has been lacking cover.

In July 2020, the National Independent Lifeboat Association (NILA) was formed and established as a charity, to give independent lifeboats operators in the UK and Jersey a single voice in national conversations while remaining independent. Not all independent lifeboats are members of NILA. NILA has a seat on the UKSAR Operators group and the National Water Safety Forum. In October 2020, the UK Parliament debated lifeboat coverage in depth, principally in respect of COVID-19, but generally to consider the future of lifeboat coverage around the UK, and to raise awareness of independent services and the funding difficulties they faced. A number of individual lifeboat stations (independent and RNLI) were highlighted.

== List of independent lifeboat services ==
Independent lifeboat services are spread across England, Wales, Scotland, Jersey, Northern Ireland, and the Republic of Ireland. Some are primarily inland rescue services.

=== United Kingdom ===
==== England ====
| Name (Note: (DF) 'Declared Facility' with HM Coastguard) (Note: (NILA) is a member of National Independent Lifeboat Association) (Note: (SLSGB) Affiliated to Surf Life Saving GB as a Flood Rescue Team) | Location | Est. | Reg. Charity | Notes | Image |
|---|---|---|---|---|---|
| Bay Search and Rescue; (DF) (NILA) | Flookburgh, Cumbria | 1999 | 1090880 | | |
| Boulmer Volunteer Rescue Service | Boulmer, Northumberland | 1967 | 258409 | | |
| BARB Search and Rescue | Burnham-on-Sea, Somerset | 1992 | 1031263 | | |
| Caister Volunteer Lifeboat Service; (DF) (NILA) | Caister-on-Sea, Norfolk | 1969 | 262126 | | |
| Duddon Inshore Rescue | Askam-in-Furness, Cumbria | 1969 | 500045 | | |
| Felixstowe Lifeboat; (DF) (NILA) | Trimley St Mary, Suffolk | 1997 | 1082443 | | |
| Folkestone Rescue; (NILA) | Folkestone, Kent | 2014 | 1212133 | Inshore lifeboat, operates April to September, weekend daytime. | |
| Freshwater Bay Independent Lifeboat Station; (DF) | Freshwater, Isle of Wight | 1972 | 293657 | | |
| Gosport and Fareham Inshore Rescue Service (GAFIRS); (DF) (NILA) | Gosport, Hampshire | 1969 | 1159681 | | |
| Hamble Lifeboat; (DF) (NILA) | Hamble, Hampshire | 1968 | 265661 | | |
| Haverigg Inshore Rescue Team; (DF) (NILA) | Haverigg, Cumbria | 1973 | 504409 | | |
| Hayling Island Rescue | Hayling Island, Hampshire | 1984 | – | | |
| Hemsby Lifeboat; (DF) (NILA) | Hemsby, Norfolk | 1976 | 274451 | | |
| Hope Cove Life Boat; (DF) (NILA) | Hope Cove, Devon | 1960 (MCA); 2010 (Ind.) | 1140126 | | |
| Hornsea Inshore Rescue; (DF) | Hornsea, East Riding of Yorkshire | 1994 | 1154954 | | |
| Humber Rescue; (DF) (NILA) | Hessle, East Riding of Yorkshire | 1989 | 702278 | | |
| Lancaster Area Search and Rescue; (SLSGB) | Lancaster, Lancashire | 2018 | 1177231 | Established after devastating local flooding. | |
| Maryport Rescue; (DF) (NILA) | Maryport, Cumbria | 1978 | 1113807 | | |
| Mundesley Volunteer Inshore Lifeboat; (DF) (NILA) | Mundesley, Norfolk | 1972 | 266406 | | |
| North Cumbria Search and Rescue; (NILA) | Carlisle, Cumbria | 2018 | 1182703 | | |
| Pett Level Independent Rescue Boat (PLIRB); (DF) (NILA) | Pett Level, East Sussex | 1970 | 286891 | Covers Hastings to Camber | |
| Portsmouth & Southsea Voluntary Lifeguards; (NILA) | Southsea, Hampshire | 1933 | 265431 | | |
| Runswick Bay Rescue Boat; (DF) (NILA) | Runswick Bay, North Yorkshire | 1982 | 1014544 | | |
| Ryde Inshore Rescue Service; (DF) (NILA) | Ryde, Isle of Wight | 1956 | 278166 | | |
| Sandown and Shanklin Independent Lifeboat | Sandown, Isle of Wight | 1884–1916; 1988 | 299584 | | |
| Sea Palling Volunteer Rescue Service; (DF) (NILA) | Sea Palling, Norfolk | 1974 | 267211 | | |
| Severn Area Rescue Association (SARA); (DF) (NILA) | Beachley, Gloucestershire | 1973 | 1193634 | | |
| Severn Area Rescue Association (SARA); (DF) (NILA) | Sharpness, Gloucestershire | 1986 | 1193634 | | |
| Severn Area Rescue Association (SARA); (NILA) | Wyre Forest E/S Hub; Kidderminster, Worcestershire | 2005 | 1193634 | | |
| Severn Area Rescue Association (SARA); (NILA) | Tewkesbury Fire Station; Tewkesbury, Gloucestershire | 2007 | 1193634 | | |
| Severn Area Rescue Association (SARA); (NILA) | Upton Marina; Upton-upon-Severn, Gloucestershire | 2019 | 1193634 | | |
| Sidmouth Lifeboat; (DF) (NILA) | Sidmouth, Devon | 1968 | 1105914 | | |
| Solent Rescue; (DF) | Lepe, Hampshire | 1971 | 267039 | | |
| Southport Offshore Rescue Trust; (DF) | Southport, Merseyside | 1988 | 1146805 | | |
| Tees River Rescue; (NILA) | Stockton on Tees, Cleveland | 2018 | 1187247 | | |
| Ulverston Inshore Rescue; (DF) (NILA) | Ulverston, Cumbria | 2002 | 1101567 | | |
| West Cumbria Search & Rescue; (NILA) | St Bees, Cumbria | 2023 | 1204142 | | |
| West Mercia Search and Rescue; (NILA) | Bridgnorth, Shropshire | 2007 | 1122651 | | |
| West Mercia Search and Rescue; (NILA) | Telford, Shropshire | 2007 | 1122651 | | |
| York Rescue Boat (SLSGB) | York, North Yorkshire | 2014 | 1155849 | | |

==== Wales ====
| Name (Note: (DF) used to signify 'Declared Facility' with HM Coastguard) (Note: (NILA) is a member of National Independent Lifeboat Association) | Location | Est. | Reg. Charity | Notes | Image |
|---|---|---|---|---|---|
| Ferryside Lifeboat; (DF) (NILA) | Ferryside; Carmarthenshire | 1966 | 1212126 | | |
| Loughor Inshore Rescue; (DF) (NILA) | Loughor; Swansea | 1969 | 1024113 | | |
| Severn Area Rescue Association (SARA); (NILA) | Malpas Fire Station; Newport; Gwent | 2016 | 1193634 | | |

==== Scotland ====
| Name (Note: (DF) used to signify 'Declared Facility' with HM Coastguard) (Note: (NILA) is a member of National Independent Lifeboat Association) | Location | Est. | NILA | Reg. Charity | Notes | Image |
|---|---|---|---|---|---|---|
| East Sutherland Rescue Association (ESRA); (DF) (NILA) | Dornoch, Highland | 1982 | Yes | SC052080 | | |
| Glasgow Humane Society | Glasgow | 1790 | No | SC001178 | | |
| Loch Lomond Rescue Boat; (NILA) | Luss, Argyll and Bute | 1977 | Yes | SC020014 | | |
| Moray Inshore Rescue Organisation (MIRO); (DF) (NILA) | Findhorn, Moray | 2005 | Yes | SC036999 | | |
| Nith Inshore Rescue; (DF) (NILA) | Glencaple, Dumfries and Galloway | 1982 | Yes | SC022223 | | |
| Port William Inshore Rescue Service (PIRSAC); (DF) (NILA) | Port William, Dumfries and Galloway | 1979 | Yes | SC027347 | | |
| St Abbs Lifeboat Station; (DF) (NILA) | St Abbs, Scottish Borders | 2016 | Yes | SC046312 | | |

==== Northern Ireland ====
Some independent services come under the umbrella of the Community Rescue Service (CRS), Registered charity (No. NI-106359), and a member of NILA.

| Name (Note: (NILA) is a member of National Independent Lifeboat Association) | Location | Est. | Reg. Charity | Notes | Image |
|---|---|---|---|---|---|
| Bann Rescue (CRS) | River Bann, County Londonderry | 2008 | | | |
| Foyle Search & Rescue; (NILA) | Derry, County Londonderry | 1993 | NI 106685 | | |
| Lagan Search and Rescue (LSAR); (NILA) | Belfast Harbour, Belfast | 2015 | NI 101161 | | |
| Lough Neagh Rescue; (DF) | Lurgan, County Armagh | 1989 | NI 101051 | | |

=== Republic of Ireland ===
Some independent services come under the umbrella of Community Rescue Boats Ireland (CRBI) and are trained and administrated by Irish Water Safety. Those noted (DR) are Declared Resource with Irish Coast Guard.

| Name | Location | Established | Notes | Image |
|---|---|---|---|---|
| Abbeyfeale District Search & Rescue | Abbeyfeale, County Limerick | 2004 | | |
| Ballinskelligs Inshore Rescue; (CRBI) (DR) | Ballinskelligs; County Kerry | 2008 | | |
| Ballybunion Sea & Cliff Rescue Service; (CRBI) (DR) | Ballybunion, County Kerry | 1986 | | |
| Ballyheigue Sea and Cliff Rescue; (CRBI) (DR) | Ballyheigue, County Kerry | 1993 | | |
| Banna Sea Rescue; (CRBI) (DR) | Banna, County Kerry | 1983 | | |
| Bantry Inshore Search and Rescue Association; (CRBI) (DR) | Bantry, County Cork | 1987 | | |
| Blackwater Search & Recovery Unit | Fermoy, County Cork | 1981 | | |
| Blessington Rescue Boat | Blessington Lake, County Wicklow | 2007 | | |
| Bonmahon Lifeguard Club & Inshore Lifeboat; (CRBI) (DR) | Bonmahon (Bunmahon), County Waterford | 1986 | | |
| Boyne Fishermans Rescue and Recovery; (CRBI) | Drogheda, County Louth | 1967 | | |
| Bunratty Search and Rescue | Bunratty, County Clare | 1981 | | |
| Cahir River Search and Rescue | Cahir, County Tipperary | 2002 | Operating inland on the River Suir. | |
| Cahore Inshore Rescue Service; (CRBI) (DR) | Cahore, County Wexford | 1994 | | |
| Carrick-on-Suir Search & Rescue | Carrick-on-Suir, County Tipperary | | River rescue service. | |
| Corrib Mask Search and Rescue; (CRBI) (DR) | Clonbur, County Galway | 2004 | Lough Corrib and Lough Mask rescue service. | |
| Derrynane Inshore Rescue; (CRBI) (DR) | Derrynane, County Kerry | 1995 | | |
| Foxford & District Search & Rescue Unit; (CRBI) | Foxford, County Mayo | | Active 2025 but not listed as DR. | |
| Foynes and District Search and Rescue | Foynes, County Limerick | 2009 | | |
| Inchydoney Inshore Lifeboat Association | Inchydoney, County Cork | – | | |
| Kilkee Marine Rescue | Kilkee, County Clare | 1981 | Status unknown; possibly absorbed by Coast Guard Kilkee Unit. | |
| Killarney Water Rescue | Killarney, County Kerry | 1998. | | |
| Limerick Marine Search and Rescue; (CRBI) (DR) | Limerick, County Limerick | 1986 | | |
| Mallow Search & Rescue | Mallow, County Cork | 2003 | | |
| Meath River Rescue | Navan, County Meath | 1996 | | |
| New Ross River Search and Rescue | New Ross, County Wexford | <1985 | | |
| River Moy Search and Rescue | Ballina, County Mayo | 2011 | | |
| Slaney Search and Rescue | Enniscorthy, County Wexford | 1995 | | |
| Tipperary Search and Rescue | Thurles, County Tipperary | 2014 | | |
| Tramore Sea Rescue Association; (CRBI) (DR) | Tramore, County Waterford | 1962 | Operates in conjunction with RNLI Tramore, with RNLI crew. | |
| Waterford City River Rescue; (CRBI) (DR) | Waterford, County Waterford | 2005 | | |
| Waterford Marine Search and Rescue; (CRBI) | Waterford, County Waterford | 2010 | | |

=== Channel Islands ===
Whilst the Channel Islands are not part of the UK (they are Crown dependencies) they are included here because of their proximity to Britain and Ireland with their location in the English Channel and by virtue of the RNLI's coverage, which includes Jersey, Guernsey and Alderney.

| Name (Note: (DF) used to signify 'Declared Facility' with HM Coastguard) (Note: (NILA) is a member of National Independent Lifeboat Association) | Location | Est. | Reg. Charity | Notes | Image |
|---|---|---|---|---|---|
| Jersey Lifeboat Association; (DF) (NILA) | St Helier, Jersey | 2019 | Jersey No. 108 | | |

== See also ==
- List of former RNLI stations
- List of RNLI stations
- Lifeboat (rescue)
- Search and rescue (Ireland)
- Search and rescue (UK)
- List of lifeboat disasters in Britain and Ireland
