= Gosport and Fareham Inshore Rescue Service =

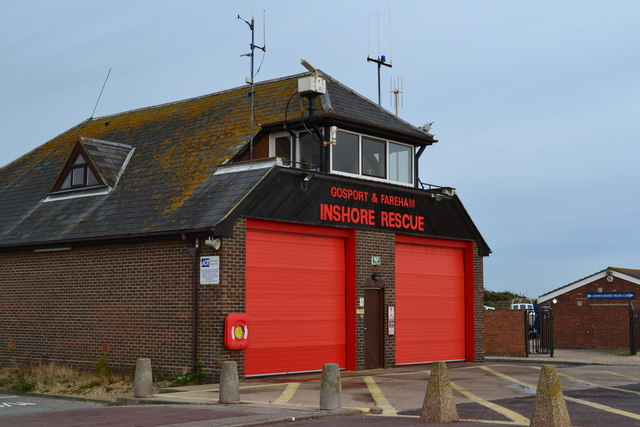
- GAFIRS lifeboat station in Alverstoke

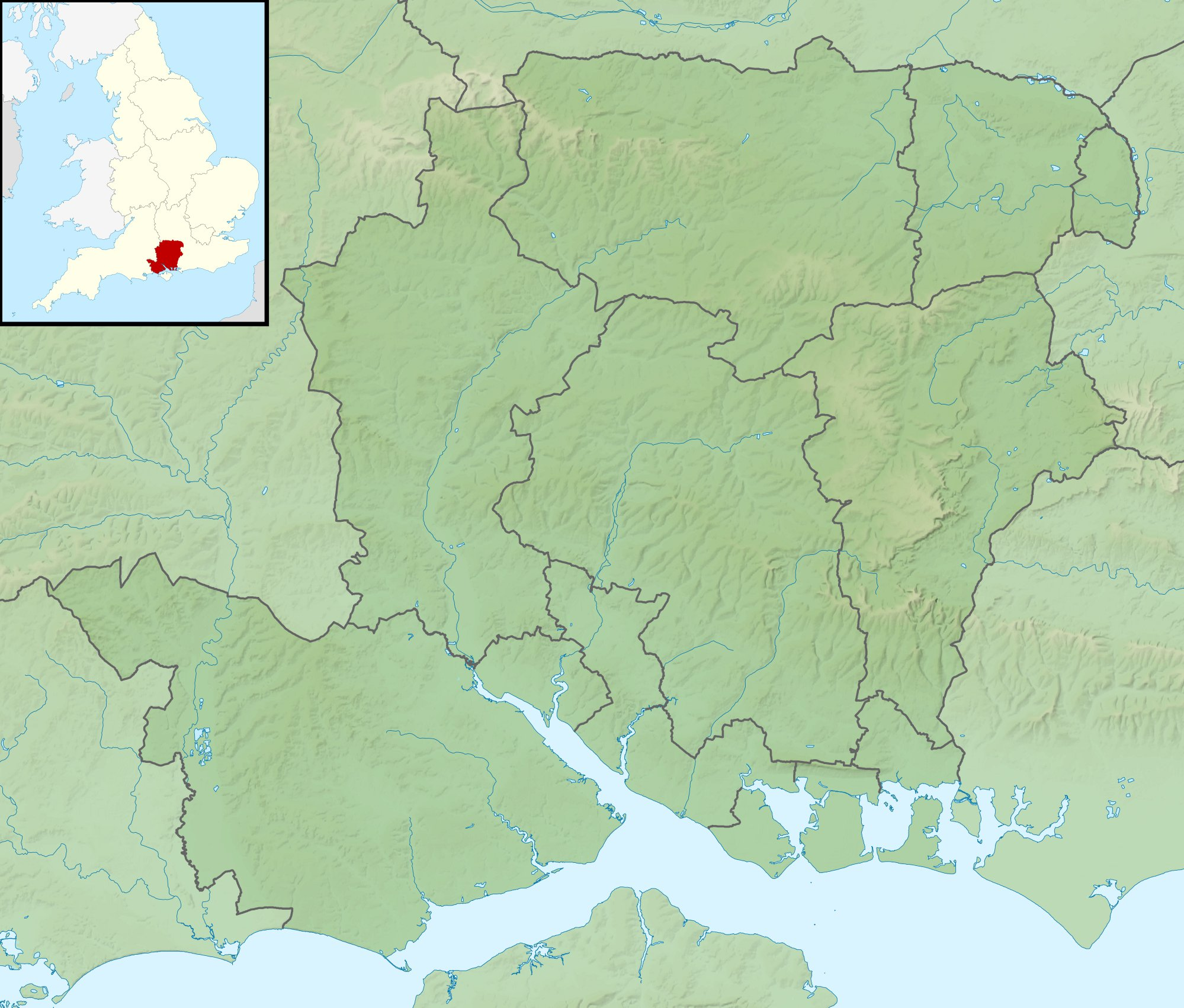
- Location within Hampshire

General information
- Type: Lifeboat Station
- Location: Alverstoke, Gosport, Hampshire, England
- Coordinates: 50°46′43.0″N 1°08′57.6″W
- Opened: 1969
- Owner: The Gosport and Fareham Inshore Rescue Service is a registered charity

Gosport and Fareham Inshore Rescue Service (GAFIRS) is a volunteer-operated independent lifeboat charity based in Gosport, Hampshire, England. It operates free lifeboat services from its station in Alverstoke covering the stretch of the Solent from Portsmouth Harbour to Titchfield Haven.

GAFIRS is on call with HM Coastguard 24 hours a day, 365 days a year. When lifeboat crews are not on station, they are ready for an immediate launch via pager callout. In addition to the frontline lifeboat service, GAFIRS helps the county's other emergency services respond to inland incidents such as flooding, snow rescue and inland water rescues.

2009 marked the charity's 40th anniversary.

== Independent status ==
There are 235 RNLI-owned lifeboat stations around the United Kingdom, and there are 65 lifeboat stations which are not owned or managed by the RNLI, such as GAFIRS. Like the RNLI, GAFIRS provides services to HM Coastguard whose equipment, training, policies and procedures comply with the Maritime and Coastguard Agency's Rescue Boat Code of Practice.

In 2010, GAFIRS and other independent lifeboat stations in the United Kingdom launched an awareness campaign to remove the common public misconception that there is only one charity "Saving Lives at Sea." The campaign, titled "Go Orange for Indie Lifeboat", aims to educate members of the public that donations to the RNLI may not actually be going towards their local lifeboat station if it is one of the independent ones, such as GAFIRS or Ryde Inshore Rescue.

== Patron ==
The patron of Gosport and Fareham Inshore Rescue Service is Surgeon Rear Admiral Lionel John Jarvis who became patron July 2023. Previous patrons have included yachtswoman Dee Caffari, and Lady Margaret Fieldhouse.

== Lifeboats and rescue vehicles ==
=== Gosport Lifeboat ===
The Joan Dora Fuller, Search and Rescue call sign "Gosport Lifeboat," is a 9 m (30 ft) Delta rigid hulled inflatable boat. It is powered by twin Yanmar 8LV, 4.42-litre turbo diesel V8s producing 320 hp each. Driving two Hamilton waterjets via an electrically controlled reversible gearbox. The craft's maximum speed is 43 knots (80 km/h; 49 mph) and can reach any part of the patrol area within 10 minutes of launch. The lifeboat has a variety of equipment to help rescue vessels and save lives. The kit includes advanced medical kit including an automatic external defibrillator (AED) and oxygen, search lights and thermal imaging cameras. There is also a VHF direction-finding equipment for homing in on a casualty vessel's radio transmissions, a chart plotter, tow lines, radar and depth sounder. The Lifeboat also features VHF radios for communications with the Coastguard, Gosport Lifeboat Station and casualties. In addition there is a tool kit with damage control items to stop leaks.

=== Gosport Inshore Lifeboat (Gosport ILB) ===
The Ian Fuller, Search and Rescue call sign "Gosport ILB," is a 4.8 m (16 ft) Ribcraft and the service's patrol craft and secondary lifeboat. She is powered by a single 60 hp outboard engine. A specially designed trailer enables her to be taken to inland incidents. She is equipped for rescue work including, Flares and para illumination flares, tow lines, GPS chart plotter, depth sounder, AIS and first aid kit (including AED and oxygen). The lifeboat has VHF radio and is DSC-compatible.

=== Gosport Rescue Mobile ===
The Gosport Rescue Mobile is an Isuzu D-Max, which acts as an incident support vehicle both for inland incidents and shoreside assistant for the organisation's rescue craft. Gosport Rescue Mobile carries first aid, oxygen, paramedic equipment and rescue stretchers. Additionally it carries light rescue tools and scene lighting equipment for protracted incidents.

== Cadets and Canoe Lifeguard Section ==
The organisation has a Cadet Section for youths between the ages of 14 and 18. The aim of the section is to teach the youngsters lifesaving skills in canoes, on surf rescue boards, on an Arancia surf rescue boat and on the beach, as well as other lifeguarding skills. The service uses canoes for routine patrols and rescue work along the coastline of the area and additionally in support of the mud rescue teams. The canoes are normally paddled by the cadet section.

The canoes used are the 'Shark' rescue canoe, Selki rescue canoe and Plastic Sea Boats. The Shark was designed originally by the service to withstand the rigours of life as a rescue craft. The service has 14 rescue canoes and two paddle boards.

== Incidents ==
The service attended 1,902 incidents from 1996 to 2011.

Year	Incidents
2023	117
2022	135
2021	117
2020	106
2019	82
2018	92
2017	94
2016	112
2015	99
2014	104
2013	86
2012	84
2011	99
2010	113
2009	138
2008	147
2007	93
2006	123
2005	108

== See also ==
- Independent lifeboats in Britain and Ireland
