= Palling Volunteer Rescue Service =

Sea Palling Independent Lifeboat
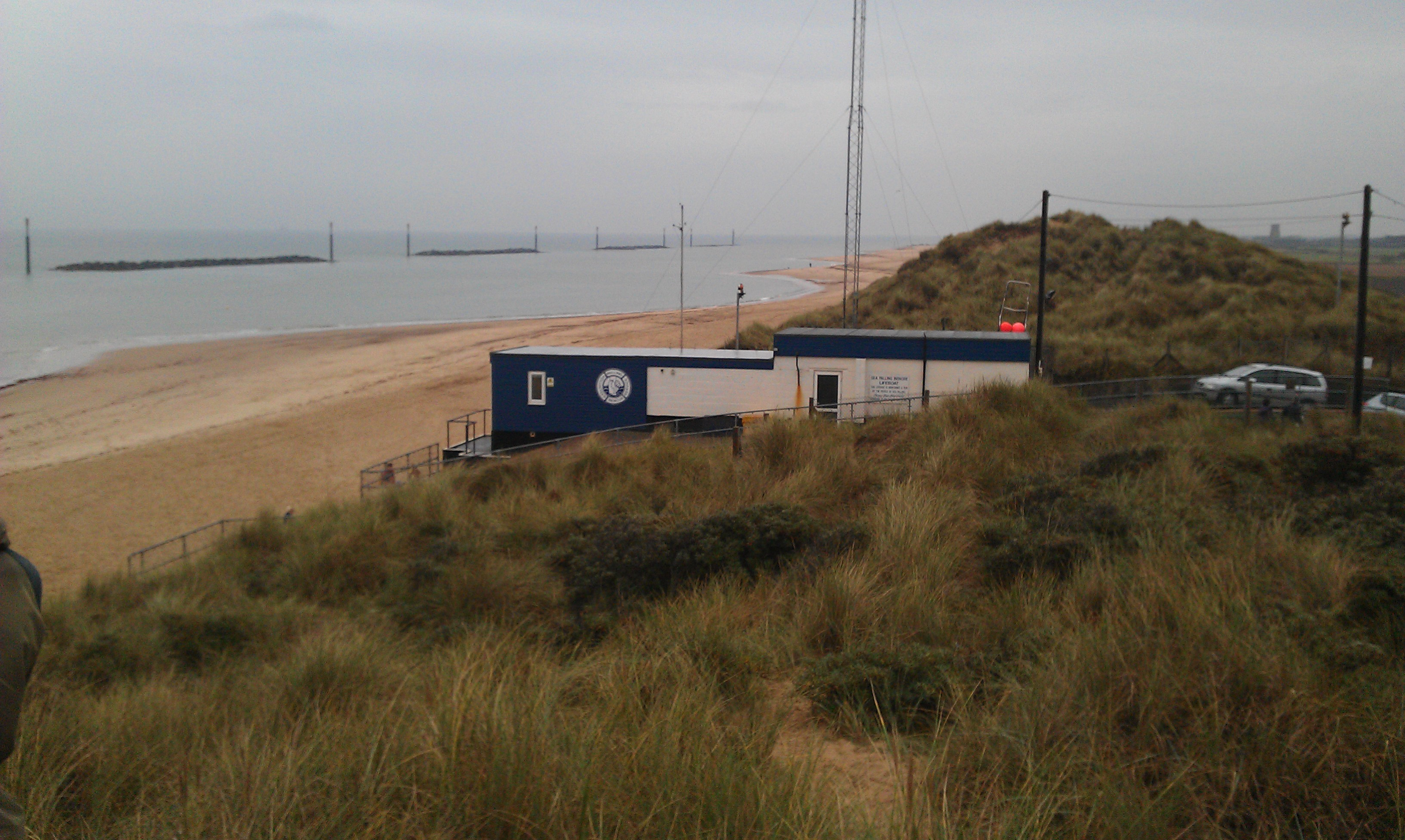

- Location within Norfolk

General information
- Type: Lifeboat Station
- Location: Sea Palling, Norfolk, England
- Coordinates: 52°47′23.23″N 1°36′9.39″E
- Opened: 1840 as part of the Norfolk Shipwreck Association
- Owner: Sea Palling Independent Lifeboat (Registered Charity No. 267211)

Technical details
- Material: Purpose-built lifeboat shed

Palling Volunteer Rescue Service is an independent, voluntary-staffed and charitably-funded inshore rescue service located in the village of Sea Palling in North Norfolk, England.

First established by private funds in 1840, it was taken over by the Royal National Lifeboat Institution (RNLI) in 1858 and operated until 1931, when it was closed in a rationalisation of regional lifeboat stations.

Revived in 1972 by local people through monies raised from private, business and charitable donations, today the renamed charitable Sea Palling Independent Lifeboat, runs a single 6.3 Ocean Pro RIB, an Arancia ILB and a shoreline rescue Argocat, all covering the area between Eccles-on-Sea and Winterton-on-Sea.

== First station: 1840–1930 ==
Palling Lifeboat Station was established in 1840 from local private funds as part of the Norfolk Shipwreck Association, drawn from the Marine salvage insurance monies gained from rescuing sailors from local ship wrecks. This provided funds for two locally made wooden oar and sail lifeboats, both of which came under the control of the RNLI from 1858. At this time, although the lifeboat crews were volunteer local fishermen, so often were they called out that they continued to be paid from the salvage insurance funds, which resultantly supplemented the local fishing industry. As a result of increased activity, a second station with its own lifeboat was established in 1870.

In the late 1920s, in part due to the world economic crash and a resultant decrease in donations, the RNLI began a programme of rationalisation of lifeboat stations. During 1929 the No.2 station was closed leaving just one boat on service. On 29 October 1930, the RNLI formally closed the station with the removal of the lifeboat Jacob and Rachel Valentine (ON 580).

During its 91 years of service, the Sea Palling lifeboat station had one of the best rescue records of all the lifeboat stations in the UK. In 400 launches 795 lives had been saved, a record bettered by only three other UK stations. Crews had gained five RNLI silver gallantry medals, with a replica of the one awarded to Tom Bishop still on show at St Margaret's Church.

== Second station: 1972–present ==
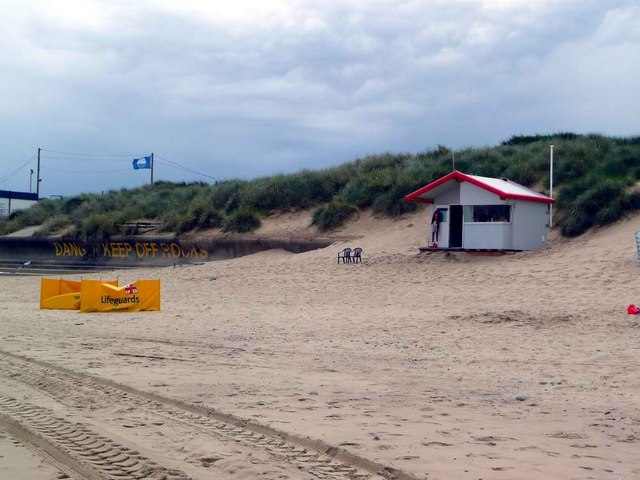
RNLI lifeguard station

In 1972, due to the developing number of beachside tourists, local residents and businesses sought to raise funds to buy and support their own local inshore rescue boat. In 1972 under the charity established as the Palling Volunteer Rescue Service (PVRS) (Registered Charity No. 267211), the first lifeboat the Hearts of Oak came into service, covering the area between Eccles-on-Sea and Winterton-on-Sea.

In 1981, the boat was replaced by the first rigid-hulled inflatable boat (RIB), named Leo after the majority of funds were raised by the Norwich Leo clubs. In April 2008, a new RIB named Lions Roar came into service. Named after the majority fund raiser and benefactor, The Hoveton and Wroxham Lions club, she was blessed by the Bishop of Norwich on 4 May 2008. However on 1 September 2011, whilst on a night time training exercise, the boat hit unidentified underwater rocks, and was so severely damaged that it was written off by the insurance company.

In December 2011, a new 5.7-metre (19 ft) Ocean Pro RIB was ordered from Humber Ribs and fitted out by Goodchild Marine. Equipped with a 90 hp outboard engine for a top speed of 36 knots (67 km/h; 41 mph), the £22,000 SP4 came into service in May 2012. She was later named Lion Heart by the Bishop of Thetford. In 2017 the engine was upgraded to a 115 hp outboard and now a 150 hp. In addition, an Arancia named Lion Ros Clipston equipped with a 30 hp outboard and a shoreline rescue quad bike were brought into service, again funded by the Hoveton and Wroxham Lions Club. In 2022 Lionheart and the Quad bike were retired and replaced by a 6.3 Ocean Pro rib, named Canon Portal and equipped with a 200 hp outboard together with a multi wheeled Argocat Responder.

Sea Palling Independent Lifeboat is a declared facility of the Maritime and Coastguard Agency. Between mid-May and mid-September each year, in addition, the RNLI maintains a part time lifeguard station on the beach at Sea Palling, located adjacent to the Sea Palling Independent lifeboat station. Among the volunteers in 2007 was Steve Ignorant co-founder of the anarcho-punk band Crass.

== See also ==
- Palling Lifeboat Station
- Independent lifeboats in Britain and Ireland
