= Moray Inshore Rescue Organisation =

Search and rescue service in Moray, Scotland

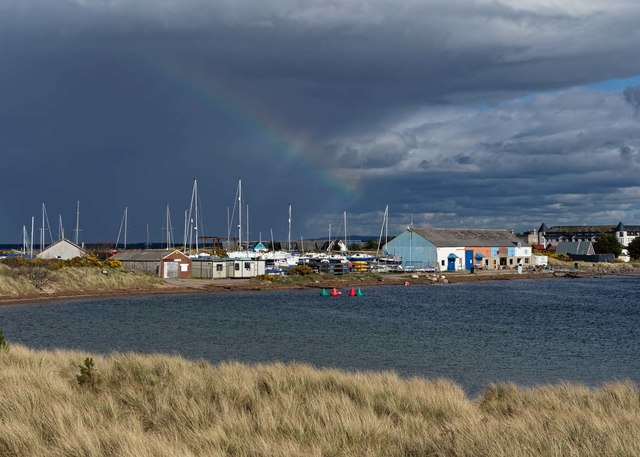
- Findhorn

- Findhorn, Moray

General information
- Type: Lifeboat Station
- Location: Findhorn Boatyard and Marina, Findhorn, Moray, IV36 3YE, United Kingdom
- Coordinates: 57°39′44.4″N 3°37′11.0″W
- Inaugurated: 2005

Website
- Moray Inshore Rescue Organisation

Moray Inshore Rescue Organisation (MIRO) operate from the marina at Findhorn, a town approximately 30 mi (48 km) north-east of Inverness, on the southern shore of the Moray Firth in the county of Moray, on the north-east coast of Scotland.

The independent search and rescue (SAR) service was established in 2005. The station currently operates a Humber Ocean Pro Rigid inflatable boat (RIB), Glyn Whitehead III, on station since 2019.

Moray Inshore Rescue Organisation is a registered charity (No. SC036999), has 'Declared Asset' status with H.M. Coastguard, and is a member of the National Independent Lifeboats Association (NILA).

== History ==
On Sunday 12 October 2003, 62-year-old Glyn Whitehead set out from Lossiemouth, to sail his yacht Maverick 16 miles (26 km) to Findhorn, but he never arrived. His yacht was found drifting 4 miles (6.4 km) off Findhorn, but with no-one on board. An extensive air and sea search over two days, involving lifeboats from Invergordon and Buckie, and SAR helicopters from Lossiemouth and Stornoway, revealed no sign of the man. His body was found washed ashore at Covesea Beach, Lossiemouth two weeks later.

The tragedy highlighted a need for a local rescue boat. Moray Inshore Rescue Organisation was formally established in July 2005, and their first lifeboat, a 5.8 m (19 ft) Humber Destroyer Rigid inflatable boat (RIB), arrived on station in August 2005. The boat was named Glyn Whitehead in memory of the Findhorn sailor.

In 2007, MIRO met all the operational and administrative requirements of the Maritime and Coastguard Agency (MCA), including volunteer crew being available 24/7, and was designated a "Declared Asset" for HM Coastguard.

A request to The Budge Foundation, a philanthropic organisation set up by Bill and Lorraine Budge, resulted in a donation which covered the operating costs of MIRO for an entire year. However, on realising that MIRO were in need of a bigger and more modern boat, the Budge Foundation then provided a grant of £26,000, which was key to the purchase of a new lifeboat, a 6.5 m (21 ft) Humber Ocean Pro RIB. At a ceremony on Saturday 8 June 2013, Lorraine Budge named the lifeboat Glyn Whitehead II.

Six years later, it was once again time for a new lifeboat. The purchase of a larger Humber Ocean Pro RIB was made possible by a considerable number of donations, and a grant from the Department for Transport "Inshore and Inland Rescue Boat Grant Fund". At a ceremony attended by over 60 guests on Sunday 3 November 2019, the third boat to operate with MIRO was named Glyn Whitehead III by Lieutenant Colonel Grenville Shaw Johnston, CVO OBE TD OStJ, the Lord Lieutenant of Moray.

2020 proved to be a busy year for Moray Inshore Rescue Organisation. The organisation received a further grant of £15,500 from the DfT "Inshore and Inland Rescue Boat Grant Fund". This allowed the purchase of a new launch tractor, along with 5 new dry suits for the lifeboat crew.

On 2 June 2020, Moray Inshore Rescue Organisation was accorded The Queen's Award for Voluntary Service. The award was later presented to the station by H.R.H. Anne, Princess Royal on a visit to the station on 13 October 2021.

In October 2020, a further grant of £5000 from the Gordon and Edna Baxter Foundation helped fund the purchase of a £10,000 aquadock, which allows the boat to be kept on a pontoon out of the water, but can be easily launched when needed.

== Station honours ==
The following are awards made at Forres.

- The Queen's Award for Voluntary Service

Moray Inshore Rescue Organisation – 2020

== Inshore lifeboats ==
Name	On Station	Class	Comments
Glyn Whitehead	2005–2013	5.8 m (19 ft) Humber Destroyer RIB	
Glyn Whitehead II	2013–2019	6.5 m (21 ft) Humber Ocean Pro RIB	
Glyn Whitehead III	2019–	Humber Ocean Pro RIB	

== See also ==
- Independent lifeboats in Britain and Ireland
