= Port William Inshore Rescue Service =

Search and rescue service in Dumfries and Galloway, Scotland

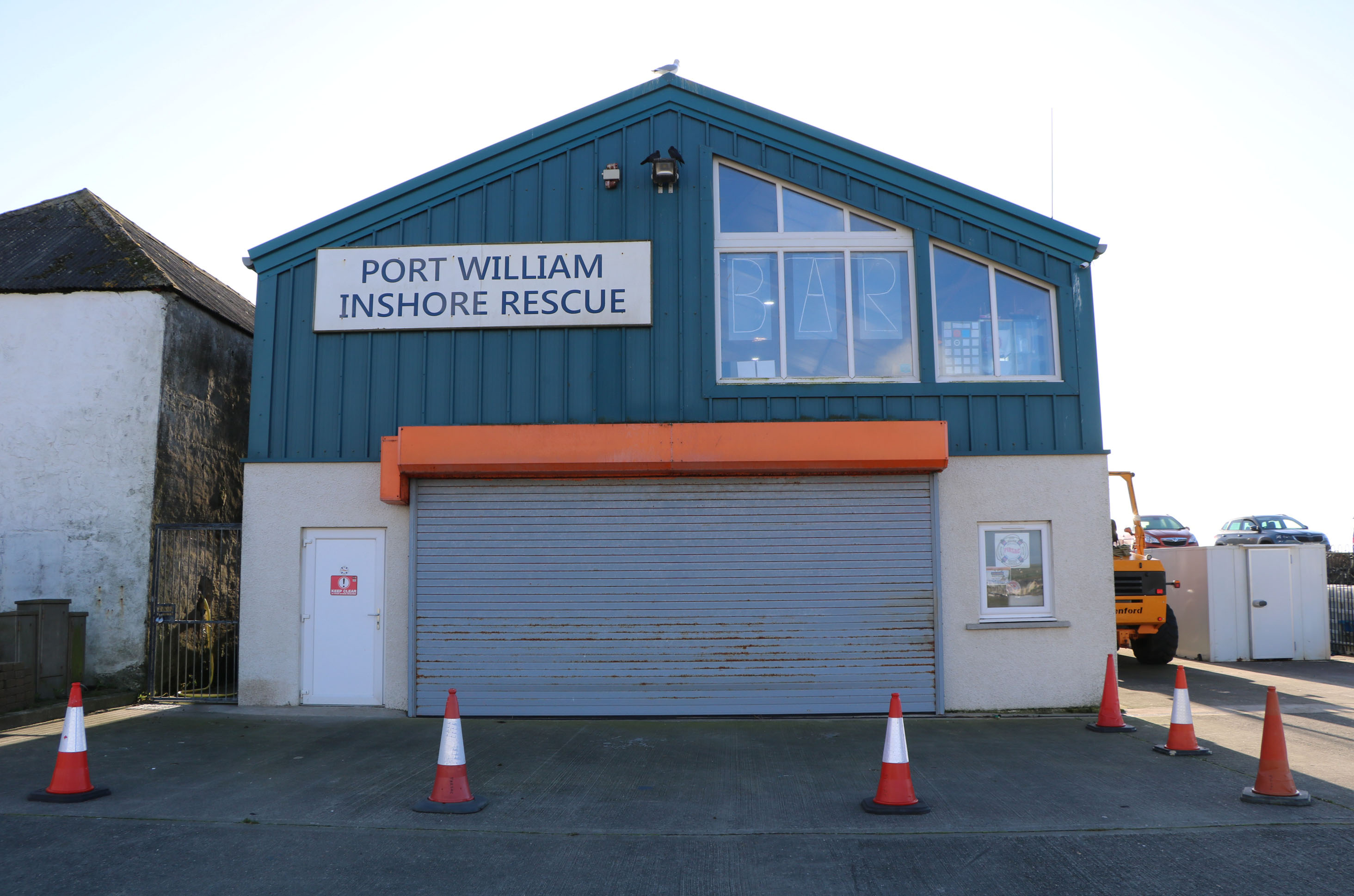
- PIRSAC, Port William

- Port William, Dumfries and Galloway

General information
- Type: Lifeboat Station
- Location: The Boatshed, The Harbour,, Port William, Newton Stewart, Dumfries and Galloway, Scotland, DG8 9QF, United Kingdom
- Coordinates: 54°45′38.3″N 4°35′05.5″W
- Opened: 1979
- Inaugurated: 1978

Website
- Port William Inshore Rescue Service

Port William Inshore Rescue Service (PIRSAC) is located at the harbour in Port William, a village on the western shore of the Machars Peninsula, approximately 23 miles (37 km) south-east of Stranraer, in Dumfries and Galloway, historically Wigtownshire, on the south-west coast of Scotland.

An independent search and rescue (SAR) service was established by a local committee in 1978, becoming operational on 20 June 1979.

The service currently operates a 6.5 m (21 ft) Ribcraft Rigid inflatable boat, with twin Suzuki 90-hp engines, on station since 2015.

Port William Inshore Rescue Service is a registered charity (No. SC027347), and a member of the National Independent Lifeboats Association (NILA).

== History ==
In 1978, with local boating incidents occurring with increasing frequency, calls were made to have a local rescue boat. The idea was put to the Royal National Lifeboat Institution (RNLI), but after careful consideration, and with a lifeboat stationed at Portpatrick, the idea was declined. Undeterred, the Port William Inshore Rescue Service Action Committee (PIRSAC) was established.

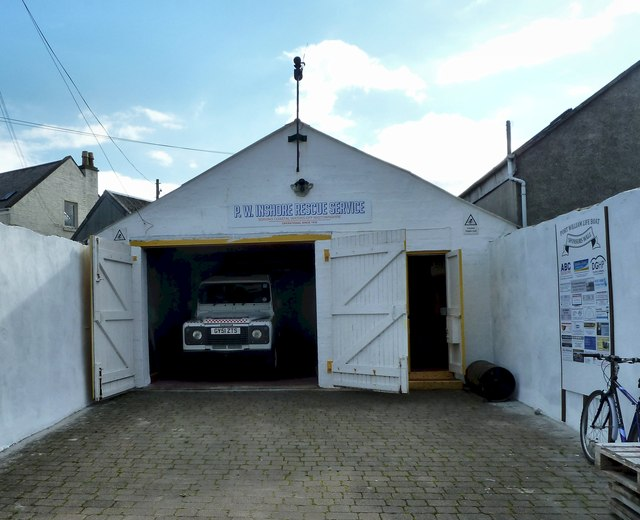
Port William Inshore Rescue Service boathouse in 2012

Thus began a series of fundraising events. Newton Stewart Round Table presented a cheque for £1,700, which covered the cost of a small 5 m (16 ft) Avon Searider inflatable boat, Pirsac I. Raised funds and donations provided a 50hp engine and radio, and with a borrowed trailer, the boat was formally launched on 1 May 1979 by Nicolette Milnes-Walker MBE, the first woman to sail non-stop single-handed across the Atlantic. Following crew training, the boat was declared operational on 20 June 1979. With a vehicle and trailer, the lifeboat could be relocated to a number of locations on the peninsula for launching, such as Auchenmalg, Rigg Bay, Garlieston and Isle of Whithorn.

The small inflatable Avon Searider would serve PIRSAC for 19 years, to be replaced in 1998 with a 5.5 m (18 ft) Tornado RIB. This new boat, named Pirsac II would come to serve Port William for a further 18 years.

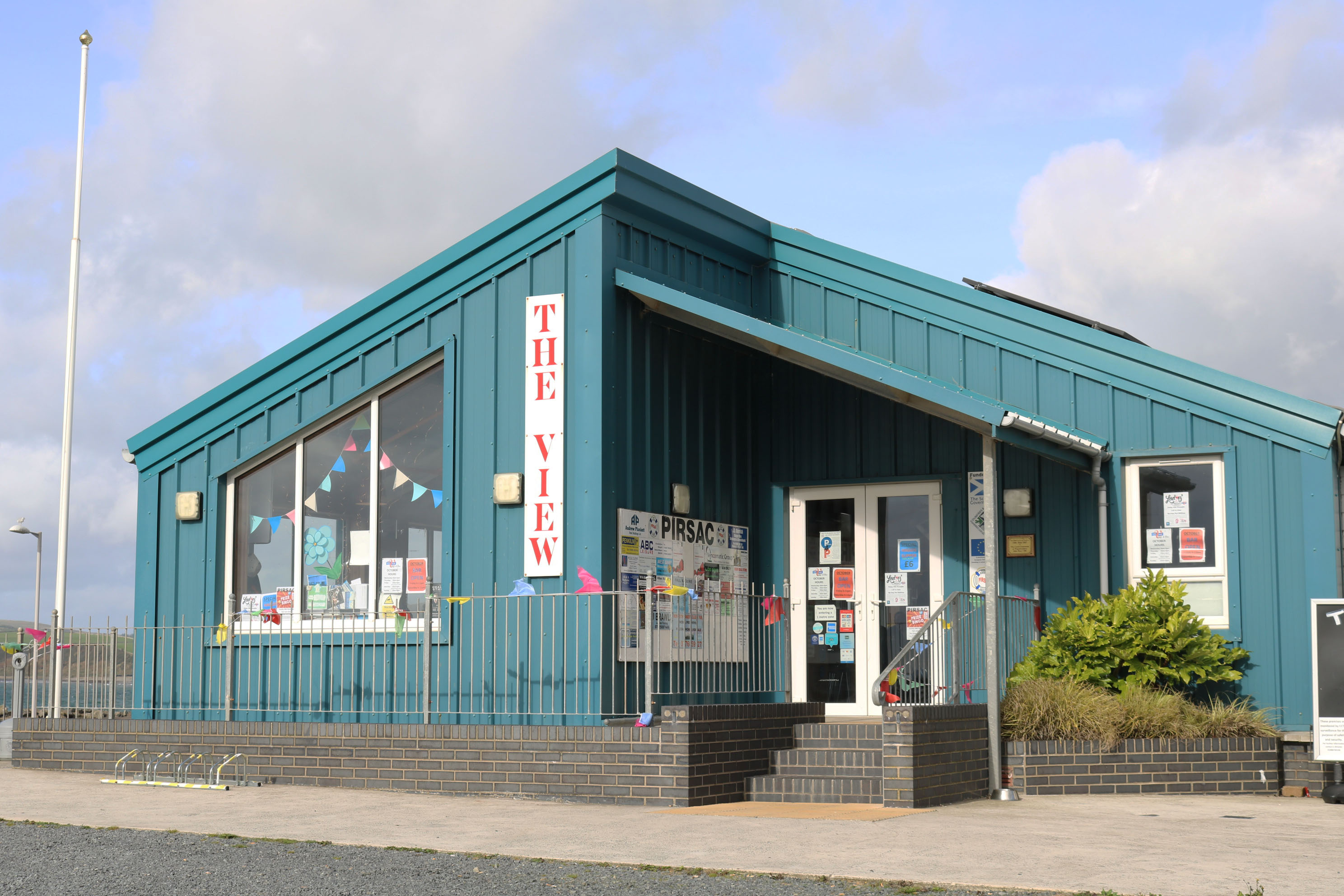
Port William Inshore Rescue Service boathouse cafe 'The View'

In December 2013, PIRSAC received a grant of £240,300 from the Dumfries and Galloway European Fisheries Fund, to enable the organisation to update their buildings and equipment, and meet current standards set by the Maritime and Coastguard Agency (MCA). A new boathouse was constructed, completed in 2016, with up-to-date crew facilities, a souvenir shop, and also a cafe, 'The View', on the upper level. It would also provide the funds for a replacement boat, and a new 6.5 m (21 ft) Ribcraft RIB, Pirsac III commenced service in 2015.

In 2016, grants totalling £60,000 were awarded to five Scottish water rescue charities from the UK Government, with PIRSAC receiving £12,690.

Further grants have been forthcoming, with £21,734.46 received from the Department for Transport 'Rescue Grant Boat Fund' in 2020.

PIRSAC chair George McKenzie was awarded the MBE in the 2021 New Years Honours.

== Station honours ==
The following are awards made at Port William.

- Member, Order of the British Empire (MBE)

George Philip McKenzie, Chair, Port William Inshore Rescue Service – 2021NYH.

- Dumfries and Galloway Life Awards

George McKenzie, Chair, Port William Inshore Rescue Service – 2017

- The Queen's Award for Voluntary Service

Port William Inshore Rescue – 2019

== Port William Inshore Rescue boats ==
Name	On Station	Class	Cost	Comments
Pirsac I	1979–1998	5m Avon Searider	£1,700	
Pirsac II	1998–2015	5.5m Tornado RIB		
Pirsac III	2015–	6.5 Ribcraft RIB		

== See also ==
- Independent lifeboats in Britain and Ireland
