= Ryde Inshore Rescue Service =

Lifeboat station on the Isle of Wight, UK

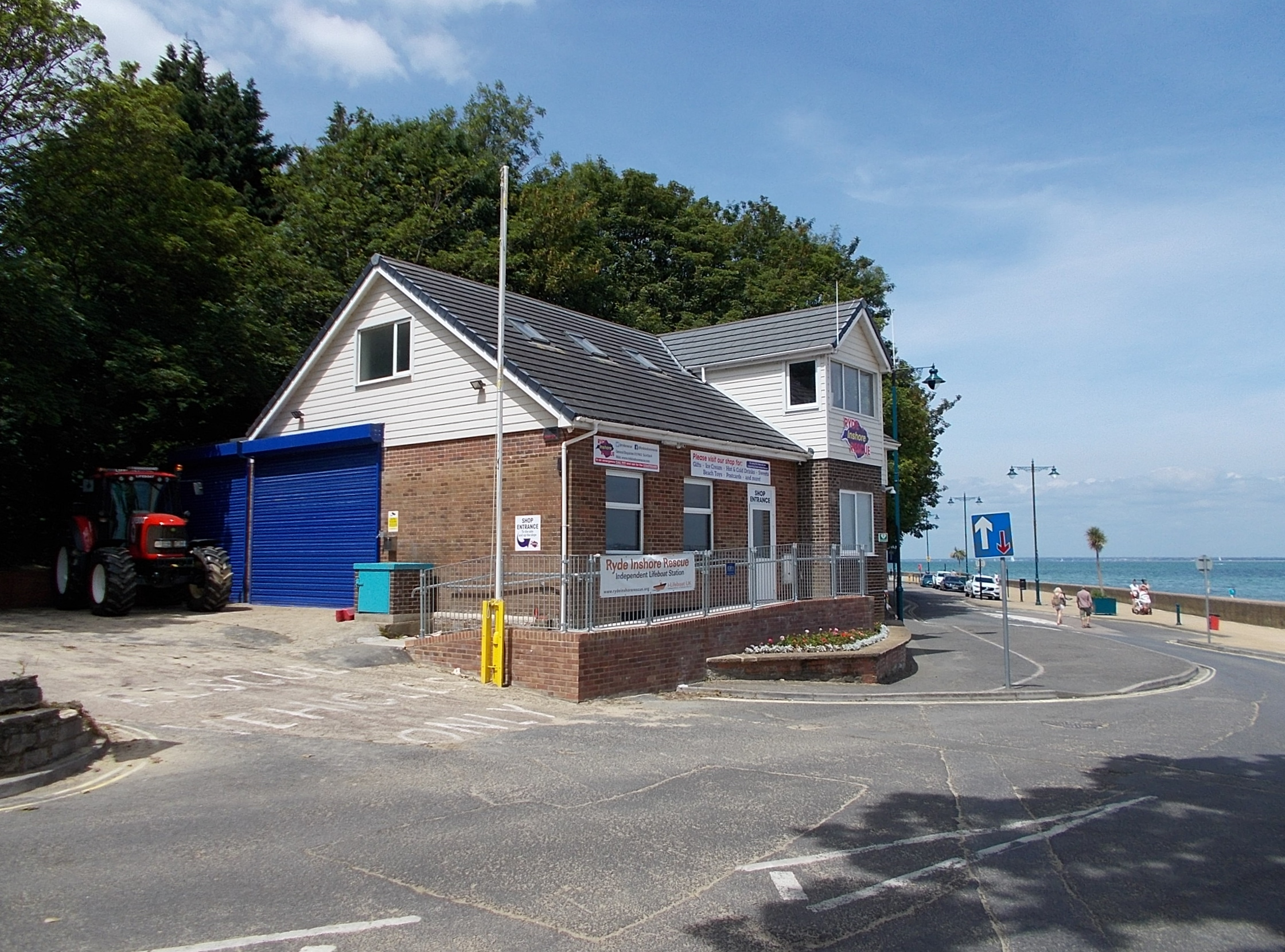
- Ryde Inshore Rescue Service lifeboat station

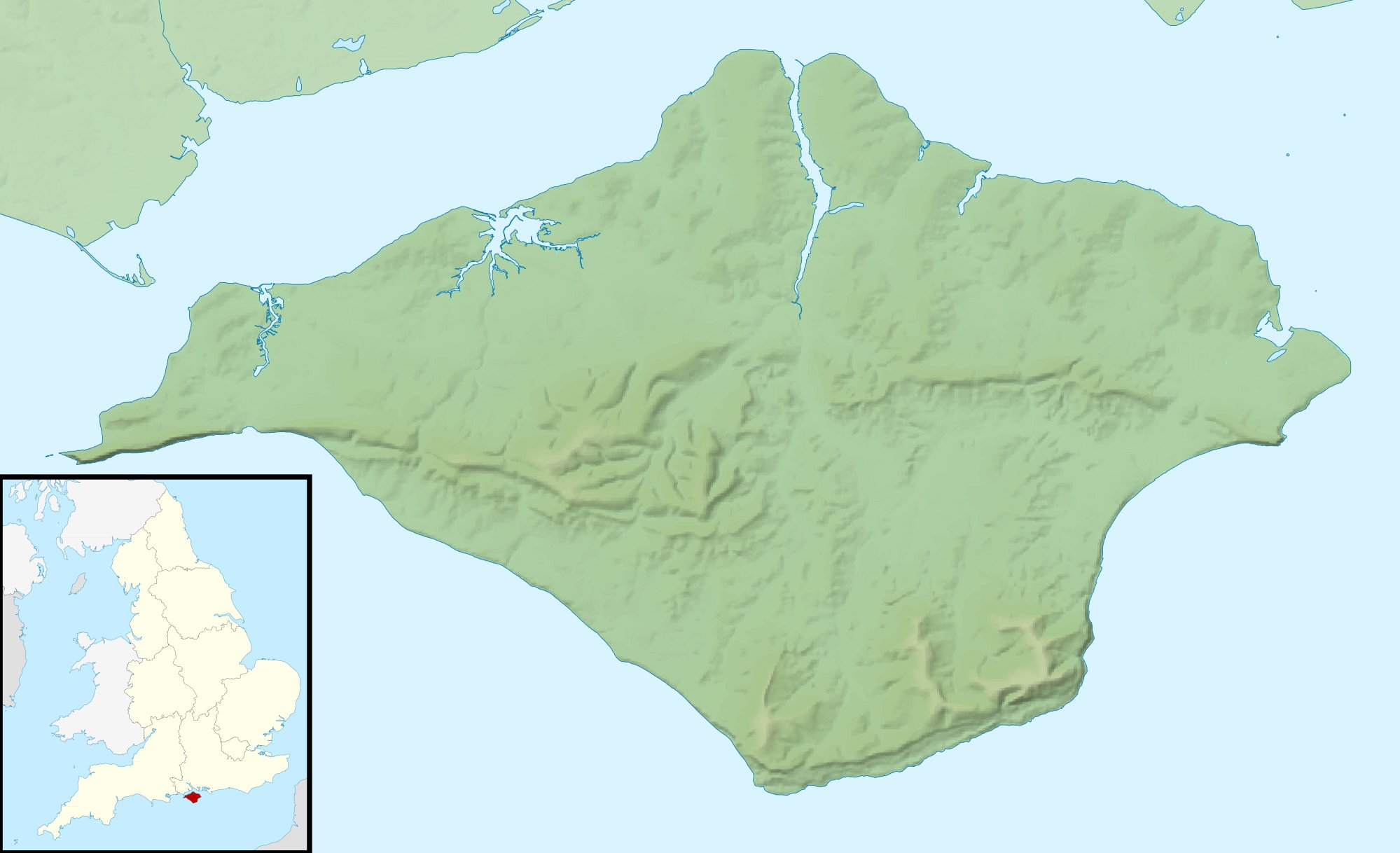
- Location within Isle of Wight

General information
- Type: Lifeboat Station
- Location: Appley Lane, Ryde, Isle of Wight, PO33 1ND., England
- Coordinates: 50°43′42.2″N 1°08′38.4″W
- Opened: 1956
- Owner: Ryde Inshore Rescue Service

Website
- Ryde Inshore Rescue

Ryde Inshore Rescue Service is located at Appley Lane, in the town of Ryde, on the Isle of Wight.

A double drowning incident at the end of Ryde Pier in 1956 prompted the reformation of a rescue organisation to serve the town.

Ryde Inshore Rescue is an independent lifeboat station within the United Kingdom. It is not part of the Royal National Lifeboat Institution (RNLI), and does not receive funding from the RNLI or the Government. The station is on call to the H.M. Coastguard 24 hours a day, 365 days a year.

The service operates two Inshore lifeboats from its station at Appley Lane, Ryde Rescue 1, an 8m Ribcraft with twin 200 hp Yamaha engines, and a smaller 4.8m Ribcraft named Ryde Rescue 2, with a single 60 hp Evinrude Etec engine.

== History ==
The first lifeboat service in the town started in 1858 and was run on a voluntary basis. On 8 May 1869 the town's rescue volunteers service was supplied with a new lifeboat called the Captain Hans Busk (ON 376). A boathouse and slipway was constructed on the west side of Ryde Pier in 1870.

A 28 ft 8 in (8.74 m) whaleboat type lifeboat was built by J. Samuel White at Cowes, on the Isle of Wight. The lifeboat had 24 oars and she was fitted with two sailing masts.

In 1894, management of the station was handed over to the RNLI. The station was in operation until 1923. The station was closed after a motor lifeboat was stationed at nearby Bembridge Lifeboat Station.

In October 2024, Ryde Inshore Rescue was temporarily stripped of its declared asset status by HM Coastguard, meaning that they would not be tasked to assist in a rescue if someone were to call 999. Six months later, in April 2025, the declared asset status was reinstated.

For further history of the RNLI station, please see

- Ryde Lifeboat Station

== Ryde Inshore Rescue Service ==
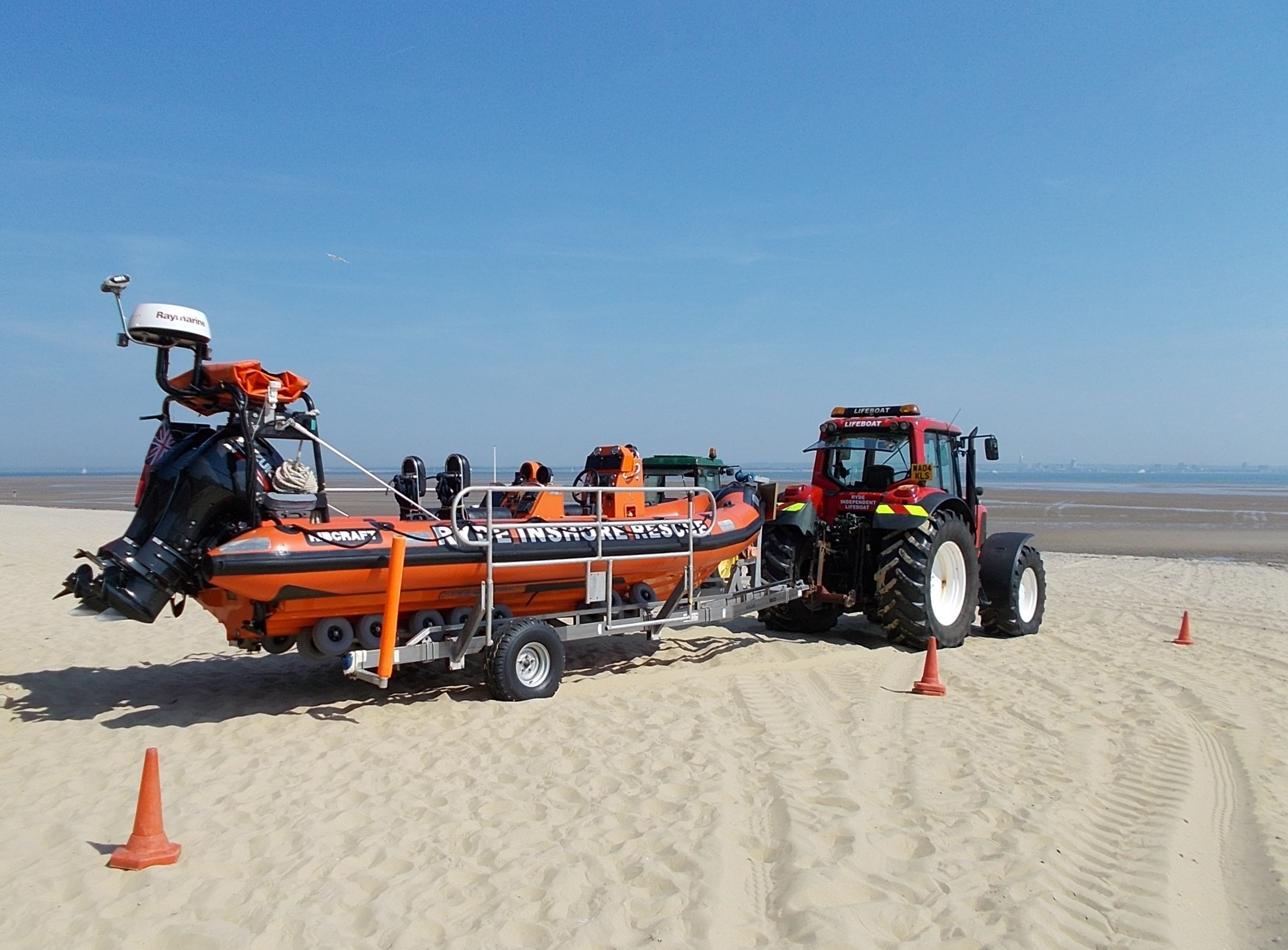
Ryde Rescue 1 and launch tractor.

A lifeguard club, also known as Ryde Lifeguard Corps, was formed in the 1940s, but had been disbanded by 1951. The new Ryde Life Guard Corps was initially formed as a beach voluntary lifeguard unit in 1956, following a double drowning fatality at the end of Ryde Pier. Help was received from both Shanklin and Sandown Life Guard Corps, to gain volunteers, and commence training, in order to meet the requirements to be recognised by the Royal Life Saving Society. Training was undertaken at Warner's Holiday Camp at Puckpool, in an unheated open pool. Initial operating equipment consisted of a Reel and line, a Rocket Line, and a 9-foot rowing boat, loaned by the Borough of Ryde.

By 1969, efforts were hampered when vandals destroyed the rowing boat, but a new boat was found with a 40 hp engine, which became the start of Search and Rescue operations. Vandals would strike again in 1978, destroying the boat house by arson. Help from the local council resulted in the construction of a new HQ and rescue centre at Appley Lane. The role of the club would gradually change to be an Inshore Rescue Lifeboat service.

== Station honours ==
The following are awards made at Ryde Inshore Rescue Service.

- The Queen's Award for Voluntary Service

Ryde Inshore Rescue Service – 2009

== Ryde Inshore Rescue lifeboats ==
Name	In service	Type	Speed	Comments
Sir Norman Echlin Bt	2007–2018	6.3m Rib		
Ryde Rescue 2	????–2021	4m Valiant Single 25 hp Evinrude Etec	22-Knots / 25-mph	
Ryde Rescue 1	2018–	8m Ribcraft Twin 200 hp Yamaha	40-Knots / 45-mph	
Ryde Rescue 2	2021–	4.8m Ribcraft Single 60 hp Yamaha		

== Ryde lifeboat launch tractors ==
Name	Type	Pull	Speed	Comments
Ryde Rescue Tango	John Deere 6820 6.8L Diesel	10+ Tonnes	40-mph	
Ryde Rescue Golf	John Deere 3350 5.9L Diesel	6 Tonnes	35-mph	

== See also ==
- Independent lifeboats in Britain and Ireland
- List of former RNLI stations
