= Derrynane Inshore Rescue =

Search and rescue service in the Republic of Ireland

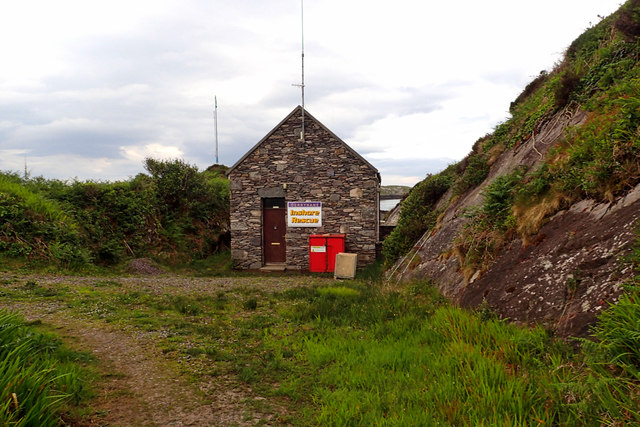
- Derrynane Lifeboat Station

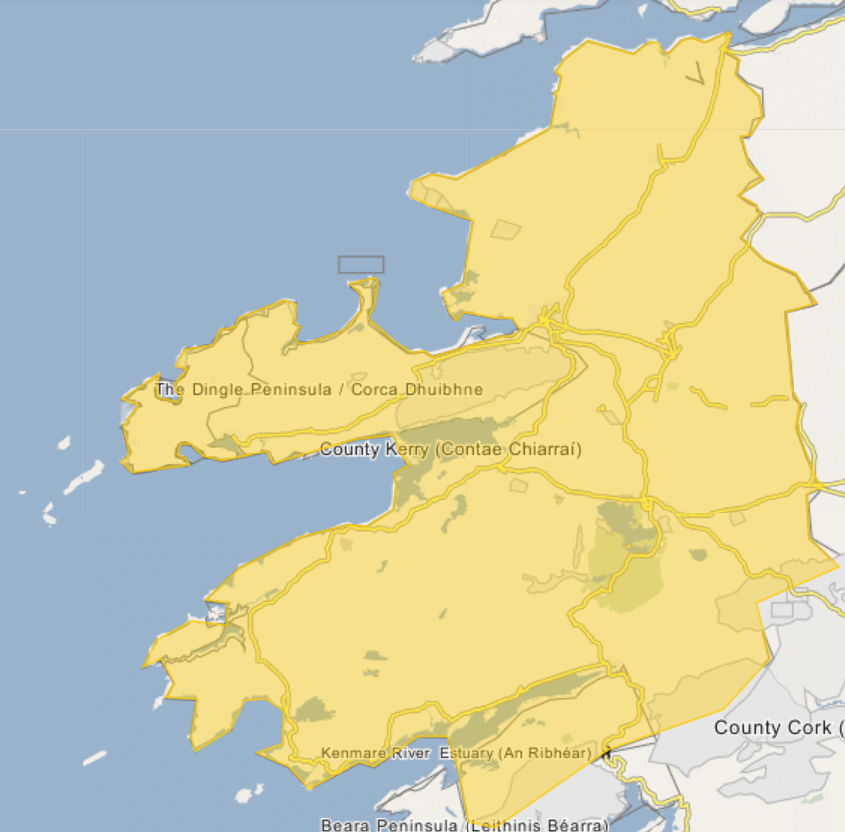
- Location within County Kerry

General information
- Type: Lifeboat Station
- Location: Mass Path, Derrynane Harbour, Derrynane, Caherdaniel County Kerry,, Republic of Ireland
- Coordinates: 51°45′41.0″N 10°08′40.5″W
- Opened: 1990

Website
- Derrynane Inshore Rescue

Derrynane Inshore Rescue is located at the Mass Path at Derrynane Beach, close to Derrynane, a village on the Iveragh peninsula, approximately 70 km (43 mi) south-west of Killarney in County Kerry, on the south-west coast of Ireland.

This independent search and rescue (SAR) service was established in 1995.

The station currently operates a 7.39 m (24.2 ft) Delta 740X RIB, on station since 2003.

Derrynane Inshore Rescue is a 'Declared Resource' (DR) with Irish Coast Guard, a member of Community Rescue Boats Ireland (CRBI), and a registered charity (No. 20054694).

== History ==
=== 1840s ===
A lifeboat station was first established at Derrynane by the Royal National Institution for the Preservation of Life from Shipwreck (RNIPLS).

A boathouse was constructed at Derrynane Beach, and an unnamed 26-foot 5-oared Palmer-class lifeboat was dispatched to the station, arriving in 1844.

No records have been found of any further activity, service or rescues at the station. After just 11 years, now operated by the Royal National Lifeboat Institution (RNLI), Derrynane RNLI Lifeboat Station closed in 1855. The lifeboat house still stands, and is now a private residence.

For further information, please see:–

- Derrynane RNLI Lifeboat Station

=== 1990s ===
On Monday 1 April 1991, John McNamara (34) and his son Simon (12), of Douglas, Cork, set out in their yacht, despite warnings about the sea state, heading for Derrynane from Ballinskelligs. They never arrived. Although overdue, the lifeboat was not immediately called. When the Valentia RNLI lifeboat was eventually called out, it was just too late.

Austin Wilson, owner of the water sports centre, along with Michael Donnelly and other volunteers, decided there needed to be a local rescue service, to provide a faster rescue response to the Kenmare River area. A small inshore boat was acquired, and Derrynane Inshore Rescue was formally established in 1995.

The early 2000s marked a big change to the operations at Derrynane. A slipway was constructed in 2002 by local volunteers, at a cost of €27,000, and a boathouse was provided and renovated by the Earl of Dunraven, of Kilgobbin House in Adare, County Limerick.

Then, on 19 July 2003, 90 teams of three people took part in a Triathlon. The swim took place in West Cove harbour. The cyclists then rode from West Cove to Coomakiste Pass and back, followed by the runners completing an 8 kilometres (5.0 mi) course to Behane. The event raised €80,000.

A new self-righting Inshore lifeboat, purchased from Delta in Stockport, was collected by the crew, and brought home, thanks to the generosity of Irish Ferries. The boat arrived to a warm welcome at Derrynane on 8 December 2003.

At a ceremony on Easter Sunday, 11 April 2004, hundreds of spectators attended Derrynane Harbour, to witness the formal inauguration of the boathouse, and official launch of the new Delta 740X Inshore lifeboat, Aghamore II. The 7.39 m (24.2 ft) boat, equipped with four seats, featured twin 115 horsepower Yamaha engines, delivering a top speed of 43 knots. A plaque remembering founder Austin Wilson, who died in 2000, was unveiled on the boathouse.

On 30 March 2011, crew members of Derrynane Inshore Rescue were invited to provide a Guard of Honour at the funeral of the Earl of Dunraven, patron of the service since 2004.

Aghamore II remained on service until November 2016, when she was sent away for a full refit, at a cost of €120,000. The fund for the refit was boosted by the support received of €33,000 from the Ring of Kerry cycle race. On Sunday 28 May 2017, a large crowd once again assembled at the boathouse, to welcome the refurbished boat back to service, marked with a fly-past by the Irish Coast Guard Sikorski Rescue Helicopter.

At her funeral at St Crohan's Church in Caherdaniel on Tuesday 19 April 2023, tributes were paid to Helen Wilson, who along with her late husband Austin, had been one of the co-founders of Derrynane Inshore Rescue.

== Derrynane lifeboats ==
Name	On Station	Type	Engines	Comments
Unnamed	1995–????	5 m (16 ft) Humber RIB	Single 50-hp Outboard	
Aghamore	????–2003	5.5 m (18 ft) Lencraft RIB	Twin 40-hp Mariner	
Aghamore II	2003–	7.39 m (24.2 ft) Delta 740X RIB	Twin 115-hp Yamaha	Full refit in 2016, costing £120,000

== See also ==
- Independent lifeboats in Britain and Ireland
