= Hamble Lifeboat Station =

Search and rescue service in Hampshire, England

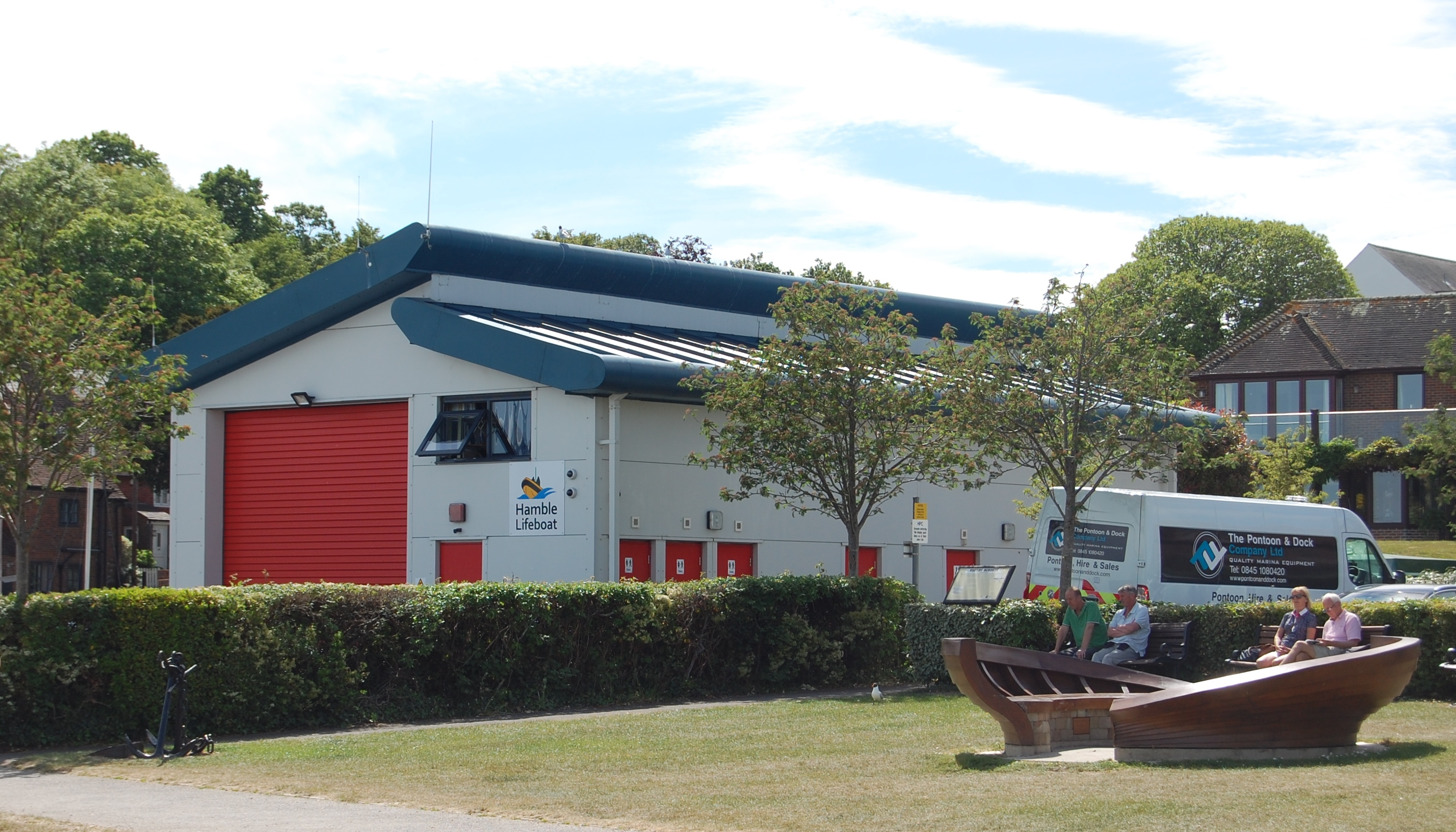
- Hamble Lifeboat Station

- Hamble-le-Rice, Hampshire
- Former names: Southampton Water Inshore Rescue Service (Hamble Rescue)

General information
- Status: Operational
- Type: Lifeboat Station
- Location: Hamble Lifeboat Station, The Quay, Green Lane, Hamble-le-Rice, Hampshire, SO31 4JB, United Kingdom
- Coordinates: 50°51′27.1″N 1°18′46.8″W
- Opened: 1968

Website
- Hamble Lifeboat

Hamble Lifeboat Station is located at The Quay in Hamble-le-Rice, a village on the western shore of the River Hamble estuary, approximately 6 miles (9.7 km) south of Southampton, on the eastern side of Southampton Water, in the county of Hampshire, England.

This independent search and rescue (SAR) service was established as 'Southampton Water Inshore Rescue Service (Hamble Rescue)' in 1968.

Hamble Lifeboat Station currently operates Harry Childs, on station since 1997, and John and Violet Hurrell, on station since 2006. Both are VT Halmatic Pacific 32 Rigid inflatable boats, with twin inboard diesel engines driving water jets.

Hamble Lifeboat is a registered charity (No. 265661), has 'Declared Facility' status with H.M. Coastguard, and is a member of the National Independent Lifeboats Association (NILA).

== History ==
By the late 1960s, the number of deaths of water-related deaths in Southampton Water, and the tributaries of the River Hamble, River Itchen and River Test, had risen to 19 in one year. No rescue service was immediately available in the area, with the four nearest RNLI lifeboats each being approximately 12 nautical miles (22 km; 14 mi) away in any direction, at Lymington, Yarmouth, Bembridge or Portsmouth.

At a parish council meeting of February 1969, Councillor Robinson reported the receipt of a letter from a Dr Tees, indicating that local discussions were to be held, in regard to the provision of a rescue boat. A subsequent meeting of the parish council revealed that the decision was confirmed, and local residents were to establish 'Southampton Water Inshore Rescue Service (Hamble Rescue)'.

Funds were soon raised to purchase the first boat in 1969, a 17 ft (5.2 m) Boston Whaler 'Outrage' Dory, which was launched from Petters slipway (now at the end of the business park at Ensign Way). However, difficulties launching directly into Southampton Water in poor weather prompted a move to The Quay in 1972, on the more sheltered shore on the River Hamble, where a small boathouse was constructed. The Inshore Rescue Service Charity Ltd was established, with 'Hamble (Inshore) Rescue' becoming the generally accepted operating title.

The organisation became Hamble Lifeboat Ltd in 2003. Plans and fundraising schemes were set in motion, for the construction of a new boathouse and crew facilities. Revised architects drawings were needed in 2007, to incorporate public toilets, and it would be 2011 before planning permission was granted, at which point, the estimate for construction was £450,000. Cost saving plans to the design required an application for further planning approval in 2014, with construction finally starting in 2015.

The newest of the two lifeboats on service, John and Violet Hurrell, sank on her mooring in 2015, destroying the obsolete inboard engines. The boat was sent away for hull modifications, to allow new engines to be fitted. She returned in 2016, with the boathouse sufficiently ready to accommodate the boat for a full refit. Finally, in 2017, the boathouse was fitted out, and in operation, some 14-years after the original decision.

== Station honours ==
The following awards are made at Hamble-le-Rice.

- British Empire Medal

Stephen Gordon Emery, Volunteer, Coxswain and Trustee, Hamble Lifeboat.
For services to Maritime Safety – 2022NYH

Peter William Brown, Volunteer Coastguard Rescue Officer, and Lifeboat Coxswain and Trainer, Hamble Independent Lifeboat.
For services to Maritime Safety – 2025KBH

== Hamble Lifeboats ==
=== Lifeboats ===
Name	On Station	Class	Engine	Comments
St Andrew	1969–1974	17 ft (5.2 m) Boston Whaler 'Outrage' Dory	Twin Mercury outboard	
St Andrew II	1974–1981	21 ft (6.4 m) Boston Whaler 'Outrage' Dory	Twin 50-hp outboard	
St Andrew III	1981–1988; 1989–1997	30 ft (9.1 m) Atlantic 'Eagle' RIB	Single 212-hp Diesel	Refit in 1988
St Mary	1989–1992	7.4 m (24 ft) Humber RIB	Single 250-hp Iveco Diesel	
St Andrew IV	1992–2006	30 ft (9.1 m) VT Halmatic 'Pacific 30' RIB	Twin 250-hp Iveco Diesel	
Harry Childs	1997–	32 ft (9.8 m) VT Halmatic 'Pacific 32' RIB	Twin 330-hp Iveco Diesel	Refit in 2022
John and Violet Hurrell	2006–	32 ft (9.8 m) VT Halmatic 'Pacific 32' RIB	Twin 350-hp Iveco Diesel	

== See also ==
- Independent lifeboats in Britain and Ireland
