= Loch Lomond Rescue Boat =

Search and rescue service in Argyll and Bute, Scotland

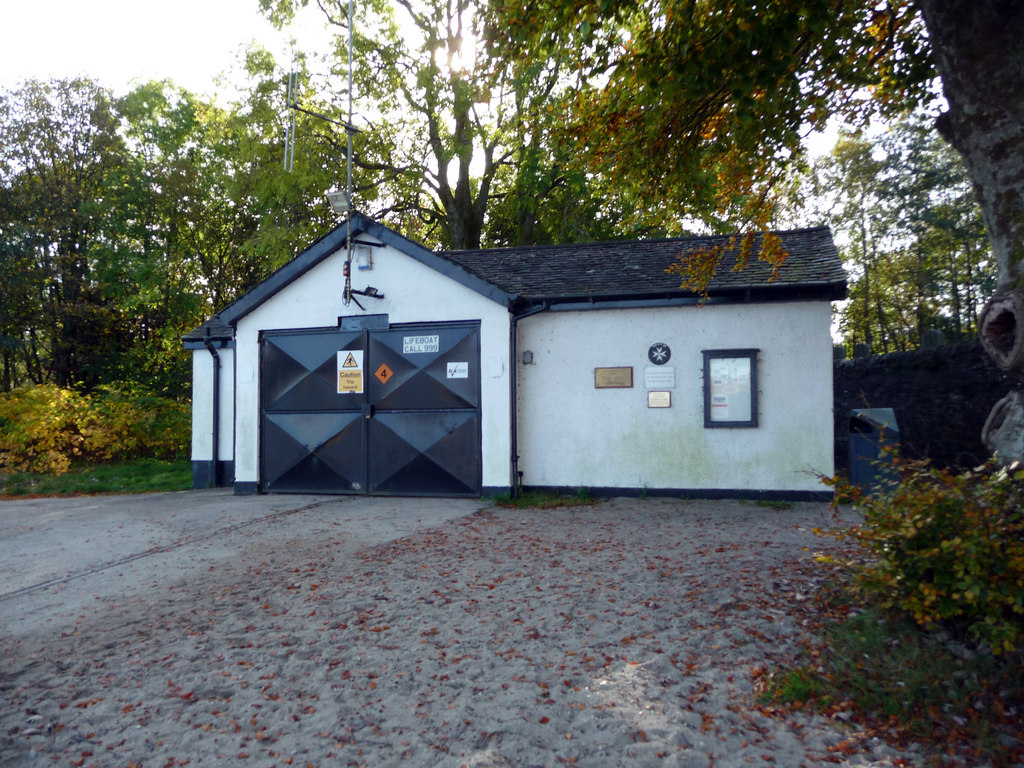
- Loch Lomond Inshore Rescue Station

- Luss, West Dunbartonshire

General information
- Type: Lifeboat Station
- Location: Luss, Alexandria, West Dunbartonshire, Scotland, G83 8NN, United Kingdom
- Coordinates: 56°06′02.1″N 4°38′08.5″W
- Opened: 1978
- Inaugurated: 1977

Website
- Loch Lomond Rescue Boat

Loch Lomond Rescue Boat (LLRB) is located in Luss, a village on the western shore of Loch Lomond, approximately 26 miles (42 km) north-west of Glasgow, in the administrative region of West Dunbartonshire, in Argyll and Bute, Scotland.

An independent search and rescue (SAR) service was established by a local committee in 1977, supported by RoSPA, to rescue people in difficulty on Loch Lomond.

The service currently operates a 7.1 m (23 ft) Halmatic Artic 22 Rigid inflatable boat, with twin Mercury 150hp engines, delivering 44 kn (81 km/h; 51 mph), on station since 2016.

Loch Lomond Rescue Boat is a registered charity (No. SC020014), and a member of the National Independent Lifeboats Association (NILA).

== History ==
At 22.6 mi (36.4 km) long, Loch Lomond is the largest lake in Great Britain by surface area of 27.5 mi^{2} (71 km^{2}), and forms part of the Loch Lomond and The Trossachs National Park.

A rescue boat for Loch Lomond was first suggested in 1975, and £10,000 was gifted by an anonymous donor. A meeting was held in Luss to established a committee in 1977, and RoSPA agreed to support the idea, with extra funding of £1000 per annum. A small inflatable boat arrived soon afterwards, and at a naming ceremony in February 1978, the boat was named Luss Younger by H.R.H. Prince Charles.

By the early 90s, RoSPA had stepped away, and management of the station had passed to the 'Loch Lomond Association'. It was decided that a new management team be established, solely responsible for the operation of the rescue boat. The boathouse at Luss was extended in 1993, and a new boat costing £25,000 was provided by the Hugh Fraser Foundation, a charitable trust. The boat was named Sir Hugh Fraser, in memory of the former chairman of the House of Fraser, Harrods, and Whyte and Mackay, who died in 1987.

The boathouse was rebuilt in 2000, and in 2004, plans were drawn up for the specifications of a new rescue craft. In 2006, LLRB received a new Halmatic Artic 22 Rigid inflatable boat, costing £105,000. The majority of funding was received from the Order of St John in Scotland. At a naming ceremony on 14 November 2006, the boat was named St John by H.R.H. Anne, Princess Royal.

By 2022, increased tourism in the area, especially during the summer months, was drastically affecting the call-out times. Crew travelling from their local homes in West Dunbartonshire, could take as long as 50 minutes to reach the boathouse. A temporary base was established at Balloch, significantly reducing launch times, and in October 2024, planning permission was granted to construct a new base near to Balloch Pier.

== Station honours ==
The following are awards made at Loch Lomond.

- The Queen's Award for Voluntary Service

Loch Lomond Rescue Boat – 2015

== Loch Lomond rescue boats ==
Name	On Station	Class	Cost	Comments
Luss Younger	1978–1993			
Sir Hugh Fraser	1993–2006		£25,000	
St John	2006–	Halmatic Artic 22 RIB	£105,000	

== See also ==
- Independent lifeboats in Britain and Ireland
