= Severn Area Rescue Association =

Independent lifeboat service in the UK

Severn Area Rescue Association (SARA)
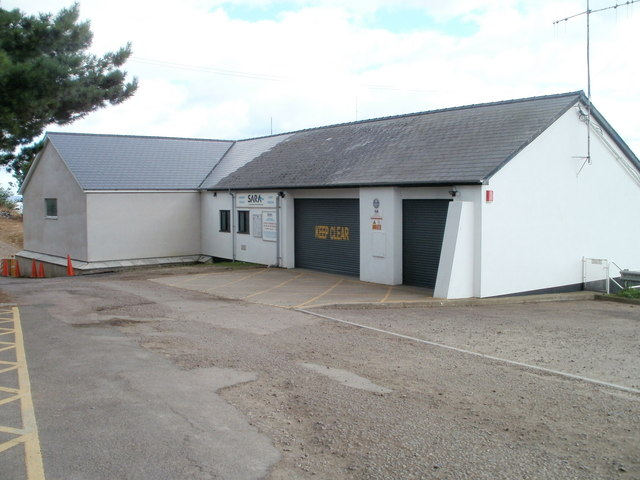
- Founded: 1973
- Type: Search and rescue Charity
- Registration no.: "Severn Area Rescue Association, registered charity no. 505504". Charity Commission for England and Wales.
- Location: The Lifeboat Station, Beachley, Gloucestershire, England
- Coordinates: 51.6133°N 2.6482°W
- Employees: 0
- Volunteers: 200
- Website: www.sara-rescue.org.uk
- 22 Boats, 20 Mobiles

Severn Area Rescue Association (SARA) or Severn Rescue is an independent, marine and land based, search and rescue organisation covering the Severn Estuary and upper reaches of the River Severn. SARA is the largest independent lifeboat service in the UK, second only to the RNLI, with 22 operational inshore lifeboats, 20 vehicles and approximately 200 personnel. They receive no funding from the RNLI.

SARA currently operates from six stations. Four are operated by the charity at Beachley, near the Welsh border at Chepstow, Newport, Sharpness and Upton upon Severn. Two stations are based at a local fire station, one at Tewkesbury and the other Wyre Forest fire station near Kidderminster.

== History ==
SARA was founded in 1973, with its then headquarters at Tutshill, which is near the current Beachley station. In 1976, SARA became a registered charity and purchased its first boat in 1977.

In 1985, SARA became an official Mountain Rescue Team in the role of cliff rescue for the Wye Valley. A year later in 1986, a second station was opened at Sharpness. This was primarily in response to a tragic loss of life in the Sharpness area. Five boats are now stationed at Sharpness

In June 2005, a new station was opened at Upper Arley in the Wyre Forest. SARA Wyre Forest is currently based in Kidderminster and operates in the largest geographical area of the four stations covering Shropshire, Worcestershire and parts of Herefordshire and the West Midlands county. SARA Wyre Forest operates three rescue boats, one 4x4 and one road ambulance, as well as housing and maintaining one of SARA's Incident Support Units.

=== Timeline ===
- 1973 – Organisation was founded at Tutshill near Chepstow
- 1976 – Became a registered charity
- 1977 – Purchased its first boat
- 1985 – Became an official Mountain Rescue Post
- 1986 – Second station was opened at Sharpness
- 2005 – Third station was opened at Upper Arley in the Wyre Forest
- 2009 – Fourth station opened in Tewkesbury
- 2011 – Joint 'Water Rescue Centre' opened in Tewkesbury, a strategic alliance between Gloucestershire Fire and Rescue Service, SARA and Gloucestershire County Council
- 2011 – Rescue training centre opened at Beachley, Chepstow
- 2014 – Flood Rescue Resource established at Newport, Gwent
- 2015 – Strategic alliance between South Wales Fire and Rescue Service and SARA at Malpas Fire & Rescue Station

== Operations ==
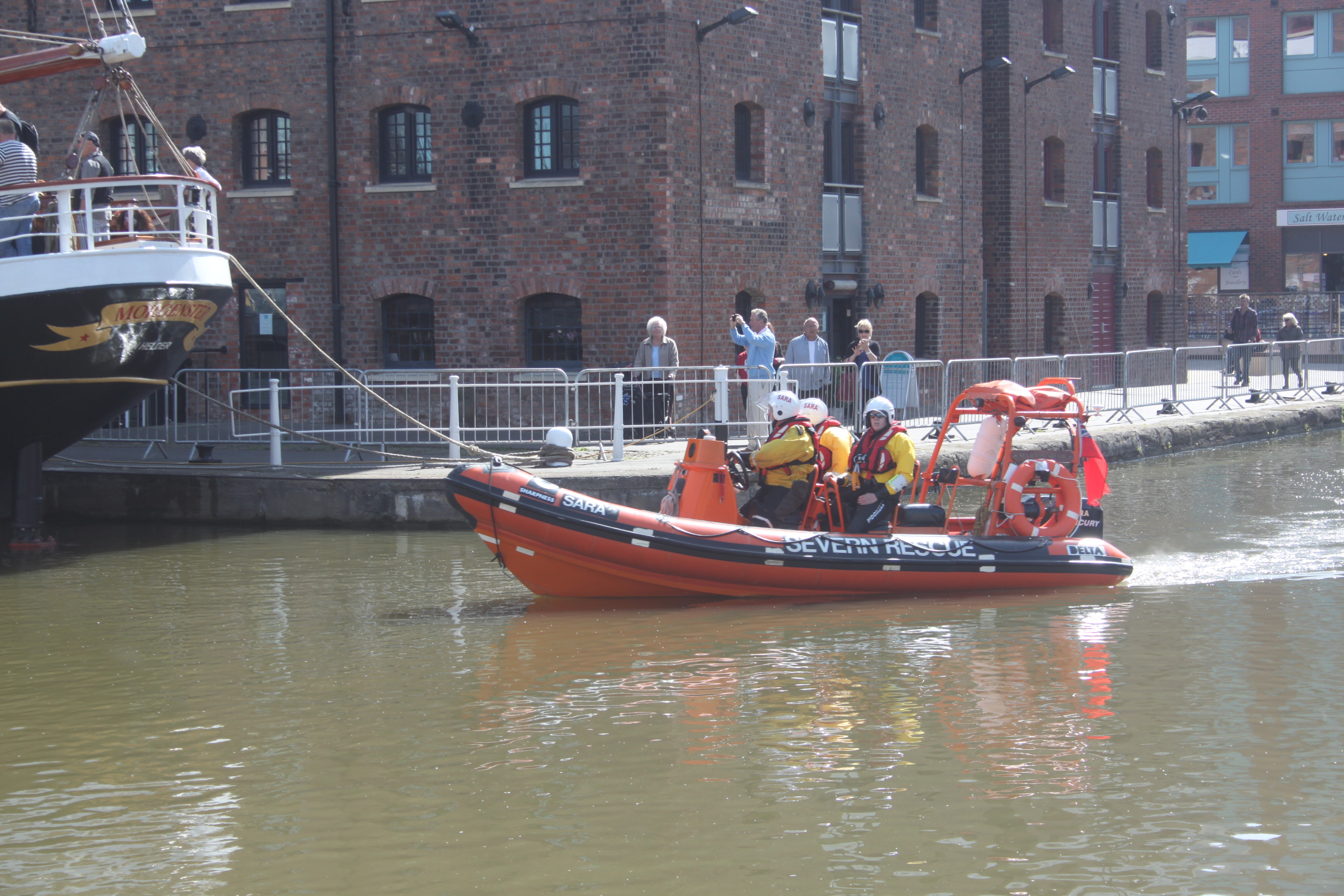
Severn Rescue boat in Gloucester Docks

SARA currently operates from six stations, Beachley, Newport, Sharpness, Tewkesbury (Gloucestershire Water Rescue Centre), Upton on Severn and Wyre Forest and the operational areas for these stations include large parts of the rivers Severn, Wye, Bristol Avon and Usk. SARA are the designated rescue service for these areas, being called primarily via HM Coastguard, Police or Fire Brigade. During flooding and other events SARA has often operated away from its core area to provide rescue services when requested.

The membership is made up entirely from volunteers, with no paid staff. As a registered charity, all funding is raised by way of donations.

All SARA stations are members of Mountain Rescue England and Wales and SARA is part of the South West England Rescue Association (SWERA).

SARA Beachley is a recognised Mountain Rescue Post, and operates an assistance capacity to the fire brigade for cliff rescues. SARA is also heavily involved in land searches, which are becoming a more frequent requirement.

The need for SARA is increasing with more callouts evident year on year. The variety and range of callouts is also increasing. Typical incidents involve boats or persons in difficulty in one of the rivers SARA cover, but also the search for missing persons, animal rescue and flood relief are becoming common.

SARA has become a Royal Yachting Association (RYA) recognised teaching establishment. With a number of certified instructors SARA is able to teach and certify its own members to RYA Powerboat Levels 1 & 2 and RYA Safety Boat. This service is also offered to the public to help bring awareness and funding to the organisation.
