= West Mercia Search and Rescue =

English Volunteer search and rescue organisation

West Mercia Search and Rescue, (formerly: West Midlands Search and Rescue) commonly abbreviated WMSAR, is a voluntary search and rescue organisation which operates in the counties of Shropshire, Herefordshire and Worcestershire. The organisation responds to calls for assistance from any of the emergency services and operates both by day and night.

WMSAR was formed from former members of Mercia Inshore Search and Rescue (MISAR). It is principally based in Shropshire and Worcestershire with plans to expand in Herefordshire.

The organisation is a registered charity and its purpose is to provide back-up personnel to the official Emergency Services in a range of situations, including in particular searches for missing persons, and support at public events and during times of adverse weather conditions, natural disaster or civil emergency. WMSAR is a member of the Association of Lowland Search and Rescue (ALSAR), an organisation with more than 900 members nationwide providing assistance to Police authorities in searches for missing persons. WMSAR is a member of the West Mercia Local Resilience Forum County Volunteer Emergency Committee (CVEC).
