= List of blood donation agencies =

This is a list of blood donation agencies in different countries.

== Africa ==
=== South Africa ===
- South African National Blood Service

== Americas ==
=== Canada ===
- Canadian Blood Services
- Héma-Québec, provincial (Quebec only), independent from the Canadian Blood Services.

=== Mexico ===
There are more than 500 blood banks in Mexico, about 60% of which collect less than 2,000 units per year. Most are government agencies, and many are private.

- Altruistic Blood Donor National Program (PRONADOSA)
- Ministry of Health (Mexico)
- Mexican Social Security Institute (IMSS)
- Institute for Social Security and Services for State Workers (ISSSTE)
- Secretariat of National Defense
- Petroleos Mexicanos

=== United States ===
The United States does not have a centralized blood donation service. The American Red Cross collects approximately 35% of the blood used, while the rest is collected by independent nonprofit blood centers, most of which are members of America's Blood Centers. The US military collects blood from service members for its own use, but also draws blood from the civilian supply.

== Asia and Oceania ==
=== Australia ===
- Australian Red Cross Lifeblood

=== Bangladesh ===
- Badhan
- Bangladesh Red Crescent Society
- Sandhani
- Roktodane Sirajganj (RS)
- Bondhumohol Blood Doner Society

=== Hong Kong ===
- Hong Kong Red Cross Blood Transfusion Service

=== Iran ===
- Iranian Blood Transfusion Organization

=== Israel ===
- Magen David Adom

=== India ===
- Akhil Bhartiya Terapanth Yuvak Parishad, a social organization, which has active involvement in blood donation in India. It has been involved in blood donation through major camps since 2010.
- All India Blood Donors Association
- Rotary Blood Bank
- Friends2support
- Indian Red Cross Society
- Sankalp India Foundation
- Athar Blood Bank

=== Indonesia ===
- Indonesian Red Cross Society

=== Japan ===
- Japanese Red Cross

=== Malaysia ===
- National Blood Centre

=== Nepal ===
- Nepal Red Cross Society
- Youth For Blood
- Blood Donor's Society Nepal
- Lions club of kathmandu Bloodhood

=== New Zealand ===
- New Zealand Blood Service

=== Pakistan ===
- Hussaini Blood Bank

=== Philippines ===
- Philippine Red Cross

=== Singapore ===
- Health Sciences Authority

=== South Korea ===
- Korean Red Cross

=== Taiwan ===
- Taiwan Blood Services Foundation

=== Thailand ===
- Thai Red Cross Society

== Europe ==
=== Belgium ===
- Belgian Red Cross

=== Finland ===
- Veripalvelu (Finnish Red Cross Blood Service)

=== France ===
- Établissement français du sang (EFS)

=== Germany ===
- German Red Cross

=== Ireland ===
- Irish Blood Transfusion Service

=== Italy ===
- Associazione Volontari Italiani Sangue (AVIS)
- Italian Red Cross

=== United Kingdom ===
- NHS Blood and Transplant
- Northern Ireland Blood Transfusion Service
- Scottish National Blood Transfusion Service
- Welsh Blood Service

== See also ==
- Blood donation
- Blood bank
