= Blood donation in England =

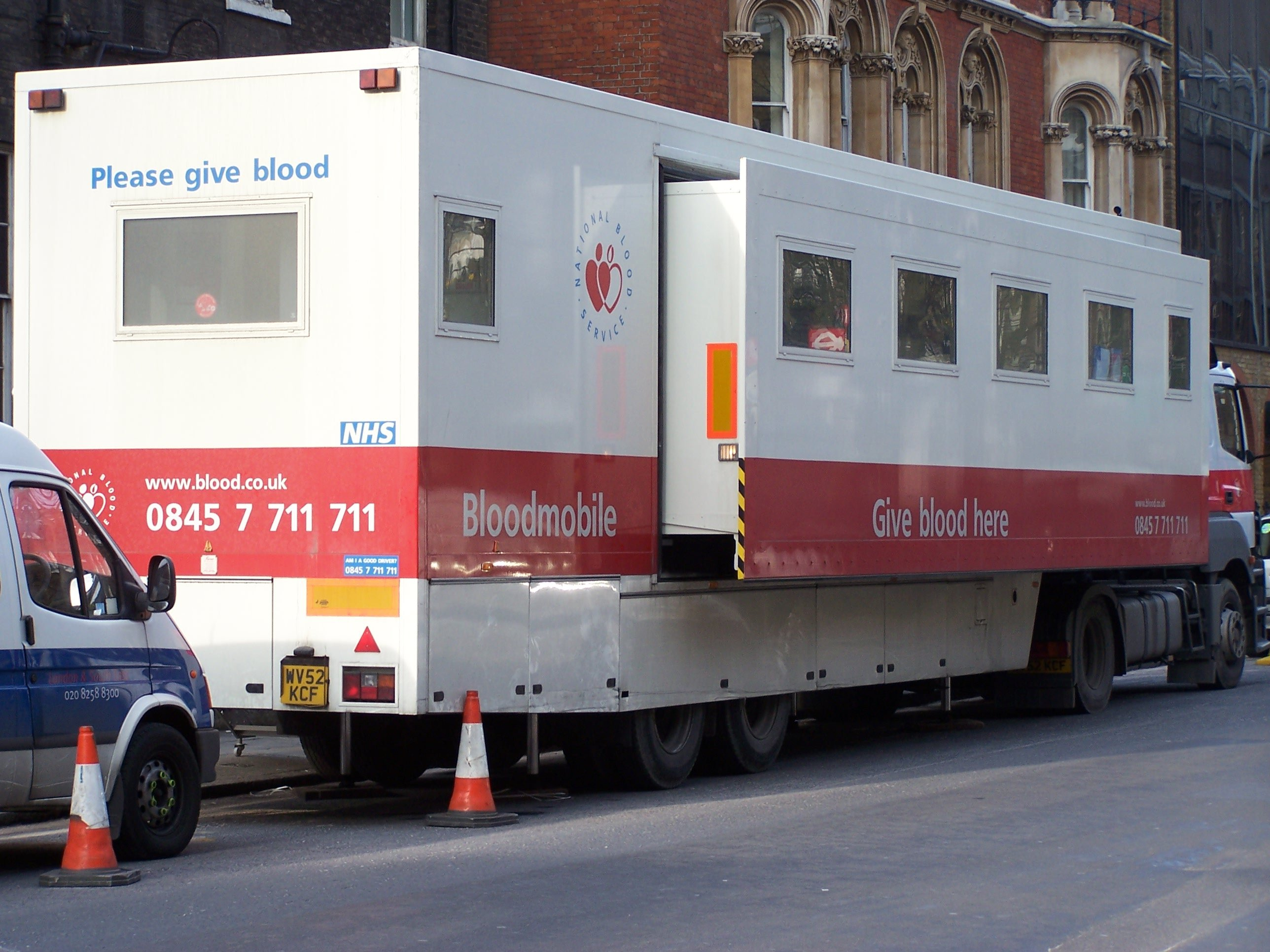
NBS mobile blood donation lorry

In England, blood and other tissues are collected by NHS Blood and Transplant (NHSBT). NHSBT Blood Donation was previously known as the National Blood Service until it merged with UK Transplant in 2005 to form a NHS special health authority. The other official blood services in the United Kingdom are the Scottish National Blood Transfusion Service, the Welsh Blood Service and the Northern Ireland Blood Transfusion Service.

== Donations ==
The service depends entirely on voluntary donations from the public. Originally, blood was collected from various donor clinics located across the country. In 1994, the first mobile session was held in Elstree, hosted by the Joely Bear Appeal. Currently, blood donation sessions are set up throughout the country and take place in many diverse venues, from village halls to mobile collection units (known as bloodmobiles), and sessions set up by companies and organisations so that people can donate at work. New donors are generally required to be fit and healthy, weigh between 50 kg (110 lb; 7 st 12 lb) and 160 kg (353 lb; 25 st 3 lb) and be aged between 17 and 66. However, regular donors are permitted to donate past the age of seventy as long as they remain healthy. Female donors may give blood up to three times a year (once every sixteen weeks) and male donors may give blood four times a year (every twelve weeks).

=== Pre-donation and exceptions ===
Prior to each donation, the donor's iron level is checked to make sure they are not anaemic. The donor will be required to fill in a questionnaire to provide consent and declare that the donation will be safe (for example, stating that the donor does not have a heart condition), and it is safe to give the donor's blood to someone else.

Weight

- To give blood, donors must weigh over 48 kg (106 lb; 7 st 8 lb). For donors who are female, aged under 20 years old, weigh under 60 kg (132 lb; 9 st 6 lb) and are under 168 cm (5 ft 6 in) height, the blood service will need to confirm their estimated blood volume is over 3500 ml.

HIV

- Every single blood donation is tested for HIV (the virus that causes AIDS) and hepatitis B and C. Infected blood is not used in transfusions but tests may not always detect the early stages of viral infection.

Pregnancy and travel

- Women should not give blood if they are pregnant or have had a baby in the past six months. People should wait six months after returning from a malarial area before giving blood, and should inform the NHSBT if they have visited Central or South America at any time.

People who cannot give blood

- People should not give blood if they have donated with fewer than twelve weeks' interval between donations, or 16 weeks if they are female. If they have a chesty cough, sore throat or active cold sore, are currently taking antibiotics, have finished a course within the past seven days, or have had any infection in that past two weeks.
- If they have had hepatitis or jaundice in the past twelve months, or had a tattoo, semi-permanent make up or any cosmetic treatments that involves skin piercing in the past four months.
- If they have had acupuncture in the past five months, unless this was done within the NHS or by a qualified healthcare professional registered with a statutory body.
- If a member of their family (parent, brother, sister or child) has suffered with CJD (Creutzfeldt–Jakob disease) or if they have ever received human pituitary extract (which was used in some growth hormone or fertility treatments before 1995).
- If they have received blood or think they may have received blood during the course of any medical treatment or procedure anywhere in the world on or after the 1st January 1980.

People who may not be able to give blood

- People who have had a serious illness or major surgery in the past or are currently on medication, or if they have had complicated dental work. People who have had simple fillings are ok to give blood after 24 hours, as are simple extractions after seven days.
- People who have been in contact with an infectious disease or have been given certain immunisations in the past four weeks, as well as people presently on a hospital waiting list or undergoing medical tests.

People who can never give blood

- People who have ever had syphilis, HTLV (human T-lymphotropic virus), HIV or hepatitis C, worked as a prostitute, or have ever injected themselves with drugs.

People should not give blood for three months after sex with

- A man (if they are male).
- Men who have had anal or oral sex with another man (with or without a condom) are deferred from blood donation for three months.
- A man who has had sex with another man (if you're a female).
- A prostitute.
- Anyone who has ever injected themselves with drugs.
- Anyone with haemophilia or a related blood clotting disorder who has received clotting factor concentrates.
- Anyone of any race who has been sexually active in parts of the world where AIDS/HIV is very common.

Note: This three-month deferral period applies to only England, Wales and Scotland – not Northern Ireland. Northern Ireland still has a twelve-month ban in place for these groups.

=== Donating blood ===
Once the preliminary checks are complete, the donor lies on a bed and a sterile hypodermic needle connected to a bag is inserted into a vein in their inner elbow. The donation usually lasts between five and 10 minutes, during which 470 millilitres (17 imp fl oz) of whole blood is given.

=== Post-donation ===
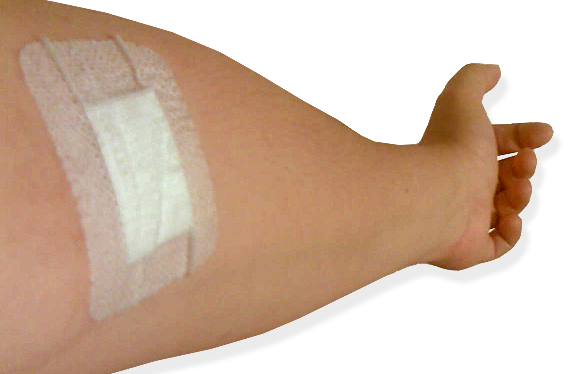
The dressing applied to a donor's arm after giving blood

Following the donation (and subsequent dressing of the wound), donors are invited to refreshments.

Donations can also be taken by machines called cell separators, usually in larger blood donation centres located in city centres. These machines use a process called apheresis to collect either blood plasma only, or plasma and platelets, the other blood cells being returned to the patient. Platelets are the tiny fragments of cells in the blood which help it to clot and so stop bleeding, and are used in the treatment of cancer and leukaemia. A constant supply is vital because platelets last only five days once collected. People who give plasma and/or platelets can donate every two weeks, and each donation usually gives two or three adult doses. One adult dose of platelets would otherwise require four whole blood donations.

=== Blood component donations ===
Blood is made in the bone marrow. It is composed of red blood cells, platelets, plasma and white blood cells, collectively referred to as blood components. Donations given at regular blood donation sessions are referred to as "whole blood". Platelets are very small cells. They work with the clotting factors in plasma to form a mesh "plug" to stop or prevent bleeding. Plasma is the fluid part of the blood. It contains protein, salts and clotting factors. White cells fight harmful bacteria and help prevent infection. Red cells carry oxygen from the lungs to the tissues.

Most platelet donations are given to patients who are unable to make enough platelets in their bone marrow. For example, patients with leukaemia or other cancers may have too few platelets as the result of their disease or treatment. Also, after major surgery or extensive injury, patients may need platelet transfusions to replace those lost through bleeding. Platelets are often life-saving and special in that they can help up to three adults or even twelve children. As platelets can be stored for only a few days, regular and frequent donors are in great demand and that is why platelet donors are asked to attend at least eight to ten times a year.

== Controversy ==
The service had come under criticism for a long implemented policy of banning men who have sex with men (MSM) from ever being blood donors. University students in both England and Scotland protested against the ban, and the University of Birmingham's Guild of Students banned the National Blood Service from setting up a recruitment stall during freshers' week.

The policy was changed in 2011 to prevent MSMs from donating for twelve months after having anal or oral sex with another man (with or without a condom). This also applied to women who have had sex with MSMs. In November 2017 the referral period on MSMs was reduced to three months for both MSMs and women who have sex with them.

On 14 December 2020, the FAIR (For the Assessment of Individualised Risk) steering group announced recommended changes that should be taking place in summer 2021. The highlights of their recommendations include: Donors who have had anal sex with a new partner or multiple partners in the past three months will be deferred, regardless of their gender or their partner's gender,

- All people who have had oral-only sex can donate and will not be deferred;
- All donors will now be asked if they have had sex before; and
- Donors who have had new or multiple partners recently will be asked if they've had anal sex in the past three months regardless of condom use.

This means that for the first time MSM should be able to donate blood without any deferral as long as they have been in a monogamous relationship for longer than three months.

== Legal ==
The trial of A vs The National Blood Authority (Queen's Bench Division) concerned the claims of 114 people, for recovery of damages arising from their infection with hepatitis C, from blood and blood products through blood transfusions from 1 March 1988. All the claimants received blood transfusions or blood products usually in the course of undergoing surgery, whether consequent upon having suffered an accident or otherwise, immediately after childbirth.

== See also ==
- Imam Hussain Blood Donation Campaign
