= Men who have sex with men blood donor controversy in the United Kingdom =

Gay male blood donation policy

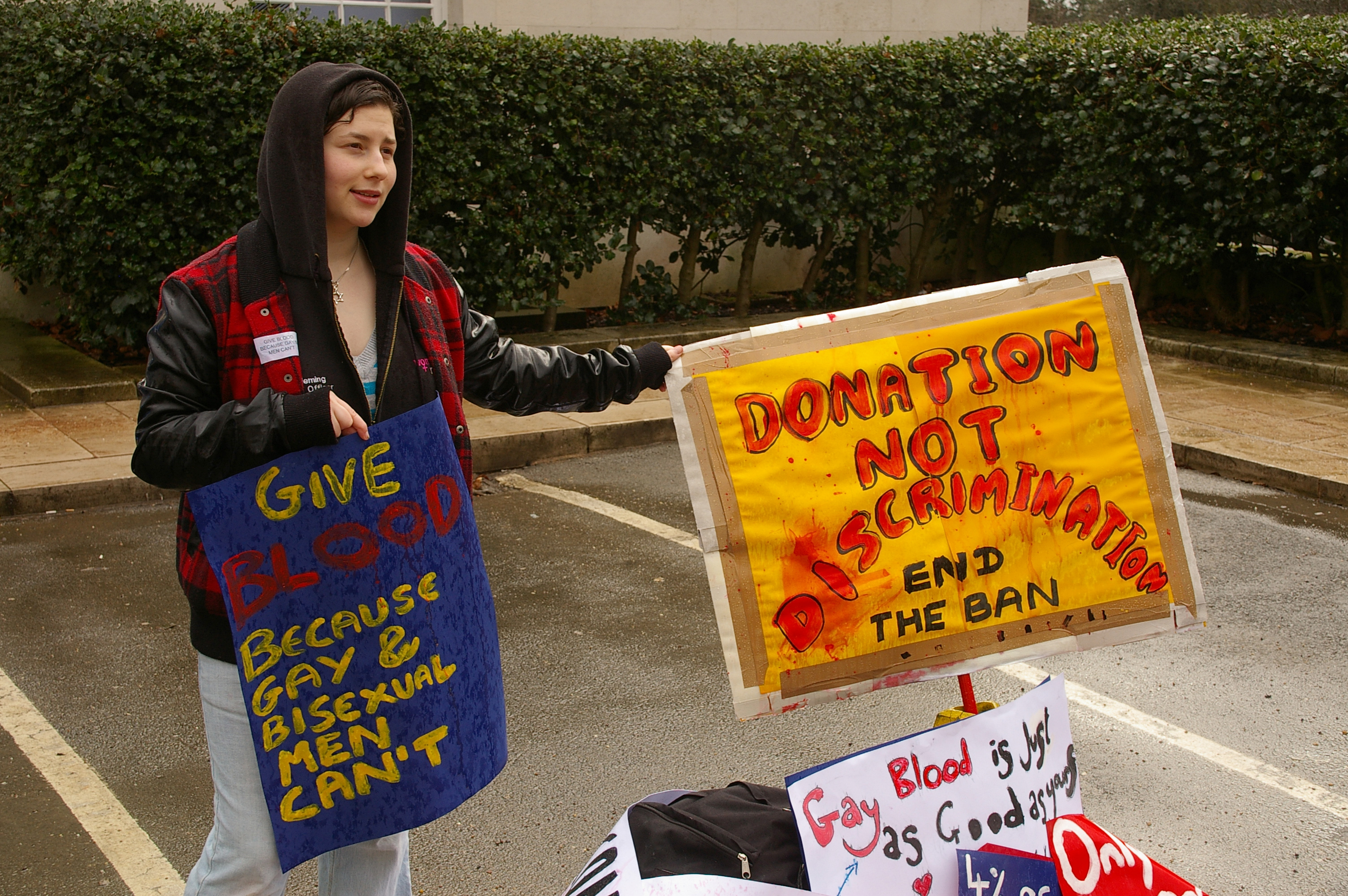
A Donation Not Discrimination protester at the University of Nottingham.

The MSM blood donor controversy in the United Kingdom refers to the former deferral policy of men who have had sex with men (MSM) in the United Kingdom who wish to donate their blood to UK blood donation services (NHS Blood and Transplant in England, the Welsh Blood Service in Wales, Scotblood in Scotland and the Northern Ireland Blood Transfusion Service in Northern Ireland). Since June 2021, there is no deferral period in all four home nations. This followed an announcement in December 2020 that blood donation policies specific to MSM would be scrapped in favour of personalised risk assessment based on sexual behaviour.

The UK blood donation services had previously argued that a deferral policy was necessary in order to protect public health and minimise the spread of blood-borne sexually transmitted infections (STIs) such as HIV. The policy was adopted based on the scientific advice of the Advisory Committee on the Safety of Blood, Tissues and Organs and was kept under regular review, with the advisory committee advising that the policy was scrapped in December 2020. The policy was criticised as being discriminatory towards gay men, and the deferral was opposed by groups such as the LGBT campaign of the NUS and Stonewall.

== History ==
Blood donation policies for men who have sex with men Men who have sex with men may donate blood; No deferral Men who have sex with men may donate blood; Temporary deferral Men who have sex with men may not donate blood; Permanent deferral No Data

=== 1980 lifetime ban ===
In 1980, MSM were placed under a lifetime ban in terms of blood donation due to the HIV/AIDS crisis of the 1980s.

=== 2011 one-year deferral ===
In September 2011 this lifetime ban was lifted in all parts of the UK (excluding Northern Ireland until September 2016), and a 1-year ban was put in place for MSM who are sexually active, regardless of whether safe sex practises were undertaken.

The gay rights group Stonewall said the move was a "step in the right direction". However, a spokesperson pointed to the fact that high-risk heterosexuals would still be less controlled than low-risk gay men: "A gay man in a monogamous relationship who has only had oral sex will still automatically be unable to give blood but a heterosexual man who has had multiple partners and not worn a condom will not be questioned about his behaviour, or even then, excluded." Academics argued that donor health checks knowingly committed the ecological fallacy, allowing population-level statistics to obscure within-group diversity, over-emphasizing the risk posed by some 'high-risk-groups' while inadequately identifying the risk posed by ‘low-risk-groups’, and called instead for practice-based risk assessment. The Independent reported that Andy Wasley, editor in chief of So So Gay magazine, called for "more precise selection criteria" to be used in identifying high-risk potential donors.

It was not clear how much the total amount of blood donated would change following this change, Sir Nick Partridge, chief executive of the Terrence Higgins Trust, is quoted as saying it is impossible to say how many men would actually be able to start donating blood, as "the vast majority of gay men are still (sexually) active".

==== Political opposition to deferral ====
In 2015, the Green Party of England and Wales claimed that they would "push for consultation on reducing the 12-month blood donation deferral period for men who have sex with men, based on individual risk assessment where the donor is identified to be not at risk of passing infections into the blood supply" in their General Election Manifesto and LGBTIQ Manifesto.

In 2015, Welsh writer and poet RJ Arkhipov exhibited a poetry series written with his own blood as ink in protest of the MSM blood donor restrictions.

The Liberal Democrats' first opposition day motion in the 2015 Parliament called for the government to end the 'gay blood ban'.

=== 2017 three-month deferral ===
In November 2017, a new blood donation policy within Scotland, England and Wales was enacted, which allowed men who have sex with men to give blood three months after their last sexual activity, instead of 12. Experts said the move would give more people the opportunity to donate blood without affecting blood supply safety. The UK Advisory Committee on the Safety of Blood, Tissues and Organs – which advises UK health departments – recommended the changes after concluding that new testing systems were accurate and donors were good at complying with the rules.

Following the restoration of devolution in Northern Ireland in January 2020, the deferral period there was reduced to 3 months, in effect since 1 June 2020.

==== Criticism ====
Following the change in deferral period to three months, Stonewall released a statement stating "while a shortened deferral period is an important move, the reality is that most gay and bi men will still be excluded from donating blood." Gay rights groups called for a move to an individualised risk assessment, which takes into account the risk associated with sexual behaviour, regardless of the gender or sex of their partner. This would follow a similar model to Italy, which saw no increase in risk of HIV infection following the change in 2011.

== Current policy ==
=== Background ===
In 2019, the UK blood donation services set up the FAIR steering group to explore possibilities of individualised risk assessment with regards to sexual behaviours and risk, in conjunction with Public Health England, Stonewall, the Terrence Higgins Trust and other groups. In December 2020 the FAIR steering group released a report detailing changes to the blood donation requirements to avoid excluding gay, bisexual and other men who have sex with men. The Advisory Committee on the Safety of Blood, Tissues and Organs recommended that the blood donation services implement the new policy recommendations.

=== Policy ===
On 14 June 2021, the UK implemented a new blood donation policy allowing gay, bisexual and other men who have sex with men to donate blood without any waiting periods providing they declare they meet the blood donation eligibility requirement on legally-binding statutory declaration, as with any other donor.

The current policy around sexual behaviour and blood donation eligibility is as follows:

- Anyone who has had anal sex with a new partner or multiple partners in the last three months, regardless of their gender or their partner's gender, must wait three months before donating.

== See also ==
- LGBT rights in the United Kingdom
- Tainted blood scandal (United Kingdom)
- Visceral: The Poetry of Blood
