= NHSBT Blood Donation =

NHSBT Blood Donation (previously the National Blood Service or NBS) is responsible for the collection and distribution of blood products within England. Other parts of the United Kingdom are served by the Northern Ireland Blood Transfusion Service, the Scottish National Blood Transfusion Service, and the Welsh Blood Service. Blood Donation is part of NHS Blood and Transplant, which was established as a special health authority in October 2005 and also has responsibility for NHSBT Organ Donation and Transplantation.

== Overview ==
Blood Donation collects at a combination of community-based temporary donation centres and 23 permanent blood donation venues across England, and it has been estimated that three units of blood are issued to hospitals within England every minute. It was reported by The Independent in 2016 that Blood Donation and NHS Blood and Transplant collect 1.8 million units of blood each year from 23,000 blood donation sessions across England and North Wales. On May 2, 2016 responsibility for blood collection in North Wales was passed from Blood Donation to the Welsh Blood Service, making it a national service operating across the whole of Wales. In 2016, it was announced by NHS Blood and Transplant that blood donors within England would receive a text message when their donation was sent to a hospital for use.

In recent years, Blood Donation has launched campaigns aimed at increasing the numbers of Black and Minority Ethnic donors. In 2016 a number of famous landmarks across the world took part in the Missing Type Campaign, in which the letters A, B, and O were removed from signage for BAFTA, Abbey Road, and Llanfairpwllgwyngyll railway station to highlight the need for the corresponding blood types. In 2017, newspapers reported that Blood Donation had launched an urgent plea for more black blood donors, following a 75% increase in issues of blood with the sub-type Ro between 2014 and 2016.
