= Felindre =

Felindre, also anglicised as Velindre, derived from the Welsh place-name melindref, meaning 'mill town', may refer to:

== Wales ==
- Felindre, Swansea, a village
- Felindre Farchog, a village in Pembrokeshire
- Dre-fach Felindre, a village in Carmarthenshire, encompassing the former village of Felindre
- Velindre Cancer Centre, a cancer centre in Cardiff
- Velindre University NHS Trust

=== Powys ===
- Felindre, Beguildy, a village
  - Felindre F.C.
- Felindre, Gwernyfed, village
