= Vishera =

Vishera may refer to:

- Vishera FX-series CPU, codename for a line of CPU by AMD
- Vishera Nature Reserve, in Perm Krai, Russia
- Malaya Vishera, town in Novgorod Oblast, Russia
- Vishera River (disambiguation)

== See also ==
- Viscera (disambiguation)
