= Blood factory =

Blood factory is a fictional concept closely linked with vampirism, specifically related to harvesting blood from humans. The term may refer to:

- the workplace of the protagonist in the film Blacula
- a level in the video game Buffy the Vampire Slayer: Chaos Bleeds
- a plot element in the Buffy the Vampire Slayer episode "The Wish"
- a plot element in the film Blade: Trinity
- an alternate title of the 1996 video game Loaded.

The term has also been used in the press to refer to documented cases of people being held against their will and having their blood removed for sale, comparable to organ theft, that has occurred in countries such as India.
