= Imam Hussain Blood Donation Campaign =

Campaign for blood donation

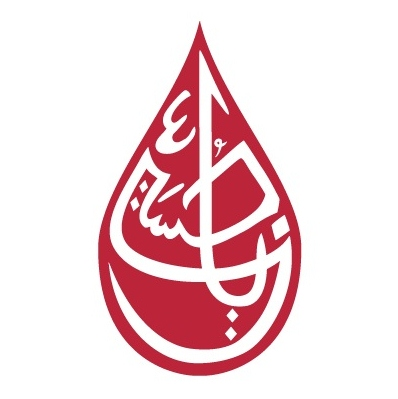
Imam Hussain^{AS} Blood Donation Campaign Logo

The Imam Hussain^{AS} Blood Donation Campaign (IHBDC) is a voluntary campaign.

== Overview ==
It aims to encourage more Muslims to give blood with the mission statement "create a world where every able Muslim saves lives by donating blood regularly"

It is the first national campaign in the UK which specifically aims to motivate Muslims to join the Blood Register by holding bespoke blood donation sessions throughout the year. Since its inception, it has grown to involve 26 cities across the UK with 3,408 successful donations and has run popular sessions at the Islamic Centre of England and KSIMC. It has also expanded to feature 16 cities outside of the UK.

The campaign is one of several projects organised by the Islamic Unity Society, a UK registered charity run by volunteers. The IHBDC works in conjunction with NHS Blood and Transplant to arrange sessions for people to donate.

== History ==
The Campaign was first launched in January 2006 in Manchester. 23 people were successful in donating blood. The campaign was well received by both the Muslim community and the NHS Blood and Transplant, which was then the National Blood Service (NBS). The following year the campaign took place in London, Glasgow, Birmingham and its hometown of Manchester with 50 successful blood donations. The donor sessions are held throughout the year and the busiest time is during the time of Muharram when the death of Husayn ibn Ali, grandson of the Islamic prophet Muhammed is commemorated. The campaign was inspired by the sacrifice of Husayn ibn Ali and tries to use his stance as motivation for others to make their own significant sacrifice by donating blood. During the last 10 years, the campaign has saved many lives by providing blood packs to the patients. In July 2016 British Muslims across London celebrated the 10th anniversary of the IHDBC by donating blood.

=== Media attention ===
The campaign's success has been covered by various media outlets over the years. This includes local BBC News and radio, television, local newspapers such as the Telegraph & Argus and many others. In December 2011, Rugby League star Ikram Butt showed his support by giving blood at the Campaign's blood drive in Leeds. In January 2018, First Minister Nicola Sturgeon visited the Edinburgh donor centre expressing her support for the IHBDC.

IUS IHBDC received significant exposure and praise in the first report from the All-Party Parliamentary Group (APPG) on British Muslims on the role Muslim charities often play during the festive season of Christmas and throughout the year.

== Structure ==
The campaign is a branch of the Islamic Unity Society, a registered charity set up in 1995 to promote and develop the wellbeing of Britain's youth on the basis of Islamic principles. They work closely with NHS Blood and Transplant who host and staff the donation sessions.

== See also ==
- Who is Hussain
