= Rotary Blood Bank =

Indian organization

- Formation: 2002; 24 years ago
- Founder: Sudarshan Agarwal
- Type: Blood bank
- Purpose: Voluntary Blood Donations
- Location: 56-57 Tughlakabad Institutional Area, New Delhi in India
- Region served: NCR, India
- Method: Camp
- Website: www.rotarybloodbank.org

Rotary Blood Bank is India's largest blood bank, located in the Tughlakabad Institutional Area, New Delhi, India.

== Background ==
Rotary Blood Bank was established in 2002 and is under the supervision of the Central Government. In September 2021, Rotary revealed its plan to extend its services to other parts of the country. It has blood banks in cities including Kakinada, Hyderabad, and Visakhapatnam. The blood bank signed an MoU with Shri Vishwakarma Skill University for providing certificate programme in phlebotomy technician and OJT in medical lab technology programmes.

== Blood collection center ==
At the 56-57 Tughlakabad Institutional Area facility are available collection stations for 5-50 people giving blood donations at a time.

== Camp ==
Rotary collects blood from organized groups e.g. Colleges and Organizations, where any person can donate blood. Blood collections are collected by two Mini Buses which provide a mobile medical facility.

== Processing of blood ==
After collection of blood from in-house/camp, it is processed in the lab; where an erst while state-of-art facility is available after initial screening. Here blood separated in major three components e.g. Red cells, Plasma and Platelets. In last few years there is a large demand for Platelets from September to December to treat Dengue fever.

=== System/equipments ===
- MCS+ Hemonitics for Platelet Apheresis
- Mitis 2 automated blood grouping system
- Cryofuge 6000 refrigerated centrifuge
- Ortho AutoVue Ultra for blood grouping and cross matching
- VITROS 3600 used for testing infectious marker
- Platelet agitator

== See also ==
- Blood donation in India
