= Who is Hussain? =

Islamic organization

Who is Hussain? is a non-profit organisation which promotes awareness about the life and legacy of Husayn ibn Ali (also spelled Hussain) and works to constructively serve humanity, primarily through blood donations and shelter provisions. An organisation founded in 2012 by a group from London, England, Who is Hussain seeks to "[let] the world know about an inspirational man who lived fourteen-hundred years ago." Primarily through public advertising, including tube posters on the London Underground, billboards in prominent urban areas and leaflet hand-outs, volunteers refer members of the public to the organisation's website. The organisation's stated vision is "to see a world inspired by the unique personality of Husayn: his actions and his compassion for those around him."

== Husayn ibn Ali ==
Husayn, son of Ali and Fatimah and the grandson of the Islamic prophet Muhammad, lived 1400 years ago in Arabia, and is recognized as an important figure in Islam, as he was a member of the Ahl al-Bayt (the household of Muhammad) and Ahl al-Kisa, as well as being the third Shia Imam. He is most well known for his principled stance against oppression and his eventual martyrdom in the battle of Karbala, 61 A.H./680 AD, in which Husayn and his companions fought the caliph Yazid and his army of circa 30,000. Who is Hussain cites this battle as epitomising Husayn's greatest qualities, saying that while Husayn had little or no hope of victory for himself, it was hoped the stand would shake the nation's conscience to battle the injustice and immorality Husayn felt present in Arabia. According to Who is Hussain the battle of Karbala laid the foundations for the overthrow of the Caliph's dynasty.

The organisation also seeks to highlight other stories of Husayn's life to promote compassion, honour and integrity. For example, "a celebrated example was when he and his brother Hasan cared tirelessly for a poor blind man they came upon in their city, in spite of traditional social expectations.

=== Water and event of Karbala ===
During the battle of Karbala, Yazid's army laid siege to Husayn's camp and forbade them access to water from the nearby river Euphrates. This is why drinking water is provided to the needy in memoriam of their martyrdom. The organization donated 30,000 bottles of water to the Red Cross in Flint Michigan during the water contamination crisis in early 2016. A similar move was also arranged in India at local level with the motivation that Husayn stands as a timeless example for all irrespective of their faith or color Repeating the tradition of water supply, team of volunteers to introduce their campaign distributed the bottles of water tagged with information about Husayn ibn Ali in Seattle, Washington, US.

== Global presence ==
Over time the organisation began to gain international recognition. In 2013, Who is Hussain began to accumulate global representatives. These representatives are local ambassadors for the organisation with a twofold purpose: (i) the organisation of local advertising promoting Who is Hussain and in particular its website and (ii) putting on goodwill and charitable events in honour of and 'inspired by' Hussain ibn Ali. Examples of these initiatives include blood donation drives, initiating food collections for the homeless and winter coat collections for the elderly.

As at December 2014, Who is Hussain had 68 representatives in cities across the globe. Each representative liaises with the central London team on a periodic basis. Representatives span cities in five continents including Chicago, Ottawa, Sydney, Adelaide, London, Birmingham, Karachi, Stockholm, Cape Town and Christchurch.

== #TeamGiveBack ==
In November 2014, Who is Hussain launched a campaign entitled '#TeamGiveBack'. The aim of the campaign was to engage with the public on social media to identify how Hussain ibn Ali inspired them. The public was invited to donate to Iraq Relief Fund (Iraq being the site of Hussain's shrine). Who is Hussain encouraged individuals to 'give back' to the community. A variety of events were organised by Who is Hussain global representatives, including the donation of care packages to the homeless and blood donation drives In 2020, Who is Hussain worked with Paani Project to build wells in Pakistan.

== See also ==
- Imam Hussain Blood Donation Campaign
- Faith-based organization
