= Viscera (disambiguation) =

Viscera (sg.: viscus) are an organism's internal organs.

Viscera may also refer to:

- Viscera (wrestler), American professional wrestler
- Viscera (Byla + Jarboe album) (2007)
- Viscera (God Module album) (2005)
- Viscera (Jenny Hval album) (2011)
- Viscera (EP), a 2016 EP by My Epic

Visceral may also refer to:

- Visceral (album), by Getter (2018)
- Visceral: The Poetry of Blood, book by RJ Arkhipov (2018)

== See also ==
- Viscera Cleanup Detail, 2015 video game
- Viscera Film Festival, a horror film festival
- Visceral Games, American video game studio
