= Syed Shahabuddin Salfi Firdausi =

Islamic Scholar, Author and Peace Activist (1956–2018)

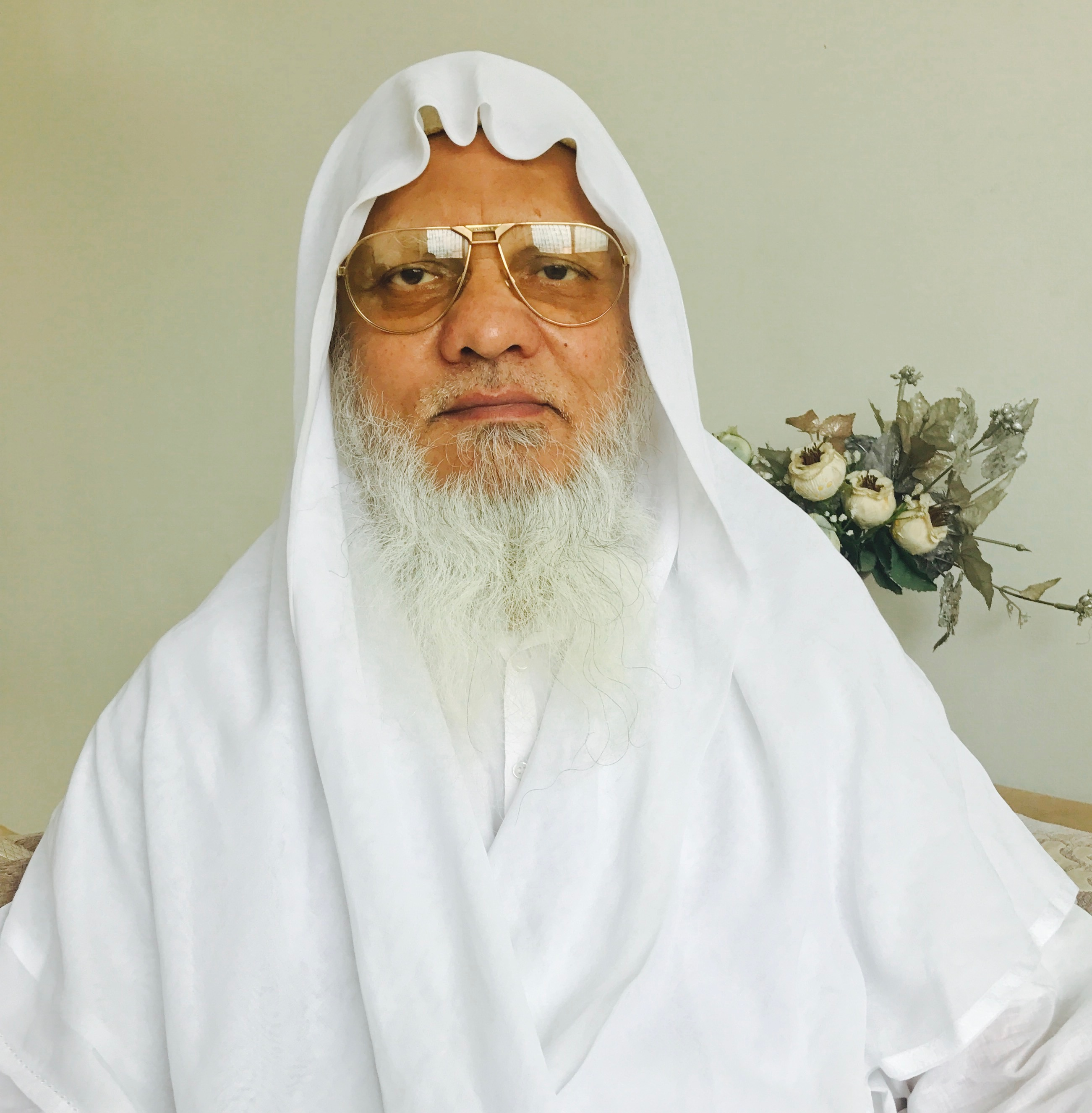
- Born: Syed Shahabuddin; March 1, 1956; Babu Saleempur, Darbhanga, Bihar
- Died: April 2, 2018 (aged 62); Pune
- Occupation(s): Islamic Spiritual Leader, Author
- Notable work: Athar Blood Bank, Seerat e Badr-ud-Duja, Masjid-ul-Salam

Maulana Syed Shahabuddin Salfi Firdausi (1956 – 2018) was an Indian Islamic scholar, author and peace activist. He founded Athar Blood Bank in 2012 at Solapur.

== Early life ==
Maulana Firdausi was born in 1956 in Babu Saleempur village of Darbhanga in a religious family. He graduated from Islamic Seminary Darul Uloom Ahmadiyya Salafia, Darbhanga, Bihar in 1971.

== Work life ==
Maulana Syed Shahabuddin Salfi Firdausi has founded the Athar Blood Bank under a public trust 'Athar Minorities Social and Welfare Association' at Solapur in 2012. He also built a mosque 'Masjid-ul-Salam' in Ambedkar Nagar, Solapur.

He authored several books about Islam including a biography of Muhammad named Seerat e Badr-ud-Duja and Talaq Talaq Talaq - a book detailing marriage, divorce procedure in Islam.

He has denounced triple talaq and halala before the Supreme Court verdict, calling them un-Islamic and instrument to oppress the women.

He also advocated the shifting of Babri mosque in Ayodhya.

The role played by Maulana during Solapur riots happened in October 2002 was lauded by Asghar Ali Engineer who wrote, "It should also be mentioned here that the role played by Maulana Shahabuddin Salafi was very laudable. He restrained the Muslim youth in Saharnagar area and Asranagar area otherwise the Muslims would have suffered far more damage. The Muslim youth were quite violent in their behaviour. It was restraint and wisdom exercised by the Maulana and also Police Commissioner Mr. More that saved the situation. The Maulana also protected many Hindu lives in these areas."

== Death ==
Maulana Firdausi died on April 2, 2018, due to a heart attack at his Pune residence. He was buried at Kondhwa Gaothan Muslim cemetery in Pune.
