= Peter Wyman =

Peter Lewis Wyman CBE DL was appointed chair of NHS Blood and Transplant on 1 April 2022. He was previously chair of the Care Quality Commission between 2015 and 2022. He is an accountant, who worked for PricewaterhouseCoopers until 2010. He was described as one of their "most longstanding and famous beancounters" by The Daily Telegraph which said that he had "got as much exposure as Kylie Minogue’s bottom".

He was a special adviser on taxation and deregulation to the Parliamentary Under-Secretary of State for Corporate Affairs, Neil Hamilton, from 1993 to 1994, a member of the Deregulation Task Force between 1994 and 1997 and external overseer of the Inland Revenue/Contributions Agency joint-working programme between 1995 and 1998.

He was president of the Institute of Chartered Accountants in England and Wales during the aftermath of the Enron scandal between 2002 and 2003 and was a member of other committees and working parties, including chairman of the Professional Standards Office (1999–2000) and Deputy Chairman of the Financial Reporting Council.

He was awarded a CBE in the 2006 Birthday Honours for services to accountancy.

He was chair of Yeovil District Hospital NHS Foundation Trust.

He lives in Somerset, and is Deputy Lieutenant of Somerset and treasurer of the University of Bath.
