= Vishera River =

Vishera River is the name of several rivers in Russia:

- Vishera (Komi Republic), a tributary of the Vychegda
- Vishera (Perm Krai), a tributary of the Kama
- Vishera (Novgorod Oblast), a tributary of the Volkhov
  - Bolshaya Vishera, its tributary
  - Malaya Vishera, its tributary

== See also ==
- Vishera (disambiguation)
