= Friends2support =

Online platform for blood donors

Friends2Support.org
- Type: Non-Profit Voluntary Organization
- Area served: India, Sri Lanka, Bangladesh, Nepal, Malaysia, Yemen and Oman
- Website: http://www.friends2support.org

Friends2Support.org is the world's largest voluntary blood donors online platform and a non-profit organization providing access to contact blood donors online from its website and mobile applications. Friends2Support (F2S) has over 400,000 people voluntarily registered as blood donors.

== History ==
The five founders; Shaik Shareef, Naveen Reddy, Eswar S, Phani Kethamakka and Murali Krishna, from Narsaraopet, Guntur District of Andhra Pradesh, inaugurated F2S on November 14, 2005, in Hyderabad. with the service of only 100 voluntary blood donors. The founders are all software engineers employed in various countries. Friends2Support was founded as an effort to tackle the issue of blood unavailability at the hospital.

The founding five members had to manage their IT jobs while spreading the idea. In their spare time, they held gatherings, approached people door-to-door, and mailed people they knew in an effort to promote the website.

F2S has launched mobile apps in India for Android, Windows and iPhone. The website and mobile apps allow users to track their donation records or call voluntary blood donors without third-party human interference.

== Achievements ==
- Digital Trailblazer award
- Award of Excellence 2015 from the Ministry of Health of India, June 14, 2015
- United Nations World Summit Youth Award
- Heroes of Hyderabad Award to founder Shareef from Radio City 91.1 FM
- Real Hero Award to founder Shareef
- Listed In The Limca Book Of Records For Maintaining The Largest Database Of Voluntary Blood Donors.
- World Summit Youth Award (WSYA) recognized F2S as Top 5 Runner-Up for the contribution towards using Internet and Mobiles to get Action on United Nations Millennium Development goals under the category Fight Hunger, Poverty & Disease.
- NASSCOM Foundation Social Innovation Honours shortlisted F2S for the innovative contribution to society (non-profit).
- Manthan Award 2007 was conferred during an International Conference on e-content and Sustainability event organised by the Digital Empowerment Foundation in association with the Department of Information Technology and American India Foundation in New Delhi on September 21 and 22.
