= Athar Blood Bank =

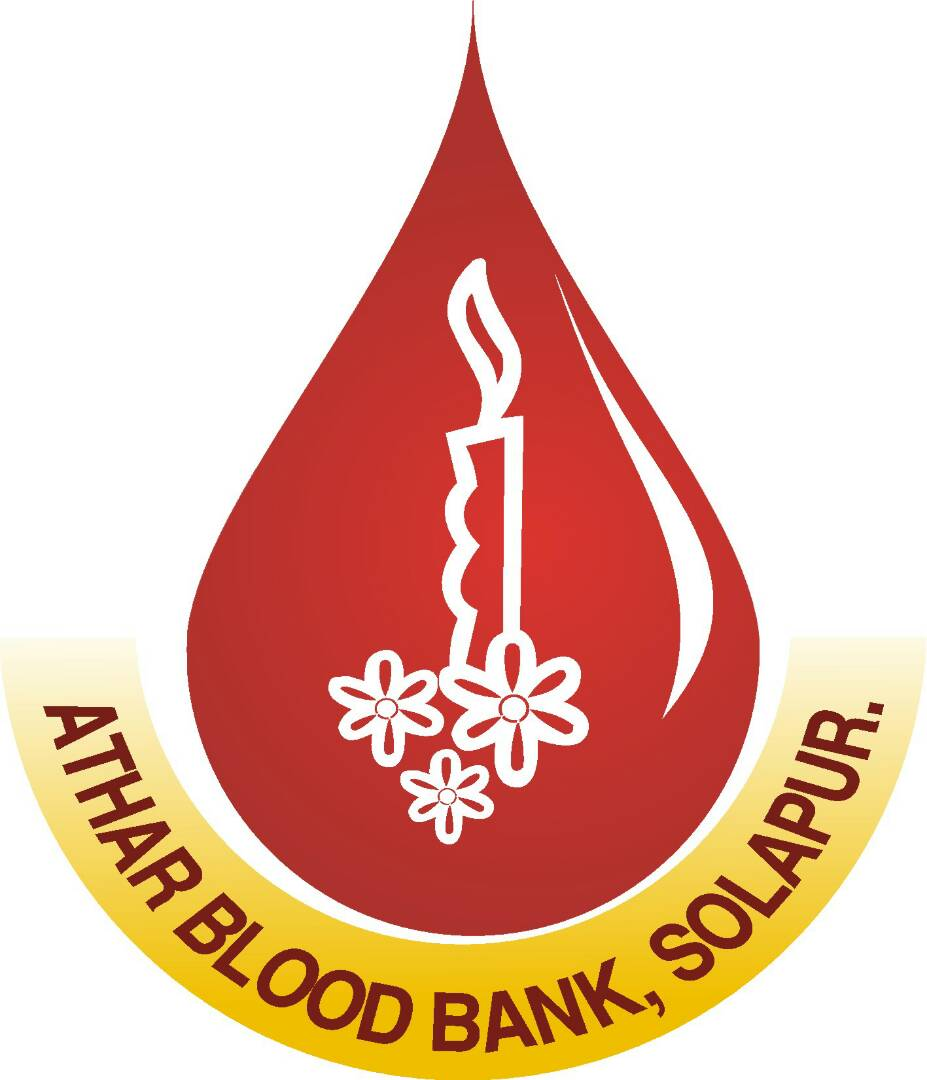
- Founded: 2 June 2012
- Founder: Syed Shahabuddin Salfi Firdausi
- Type: Blood Bank
- Purpose: Voluntary Blood Donations
- Location: 1st Floor, Jamiya complex, Near Samachar Chowk, Solapur, Maharashtra-413002
- Region served: Maharashtra
- Method: Camp
- Key people: Syed Shahabuddin Salfi Firdausi (Founder & Chairman) Dr. Nilofer Bohri, Qayyum Inamdar, Mushtaq Chaudhary, Abdul Razzaq Kamble, Azam Shaikh, Usman Mansoori, Mukhtar Humnabadi

Athar Blood Bank is an initiative by the Athar Minorities Social and Welfare Association and is based in Solapur, Maharashtra. The Athar Blood Bank was inaugurated on 2 June 2012 by Sushil Kumar Shinde (then Minister of Power (India)). Service to Humanity was the slogan chosen by the founder as a motto for Athar Blood Bank. Construction of a new Maternity Home is on the cards of the Athar Minorities Social and Welfare Association in the near future. It is running successfully and conducts blood donation camps across the state and helping humanity.

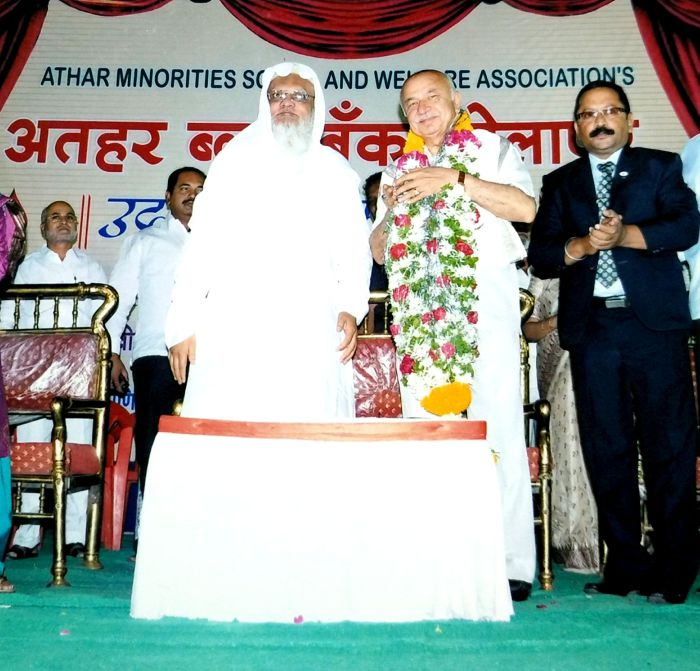
Athar Blood Bank Inauguration ceremony. (L-R) Maulana Syed Shahabuddin Salfi Firdausi, Sushil Kumar Shinde (Then Minister of Power India) and Qayyum Inamdar

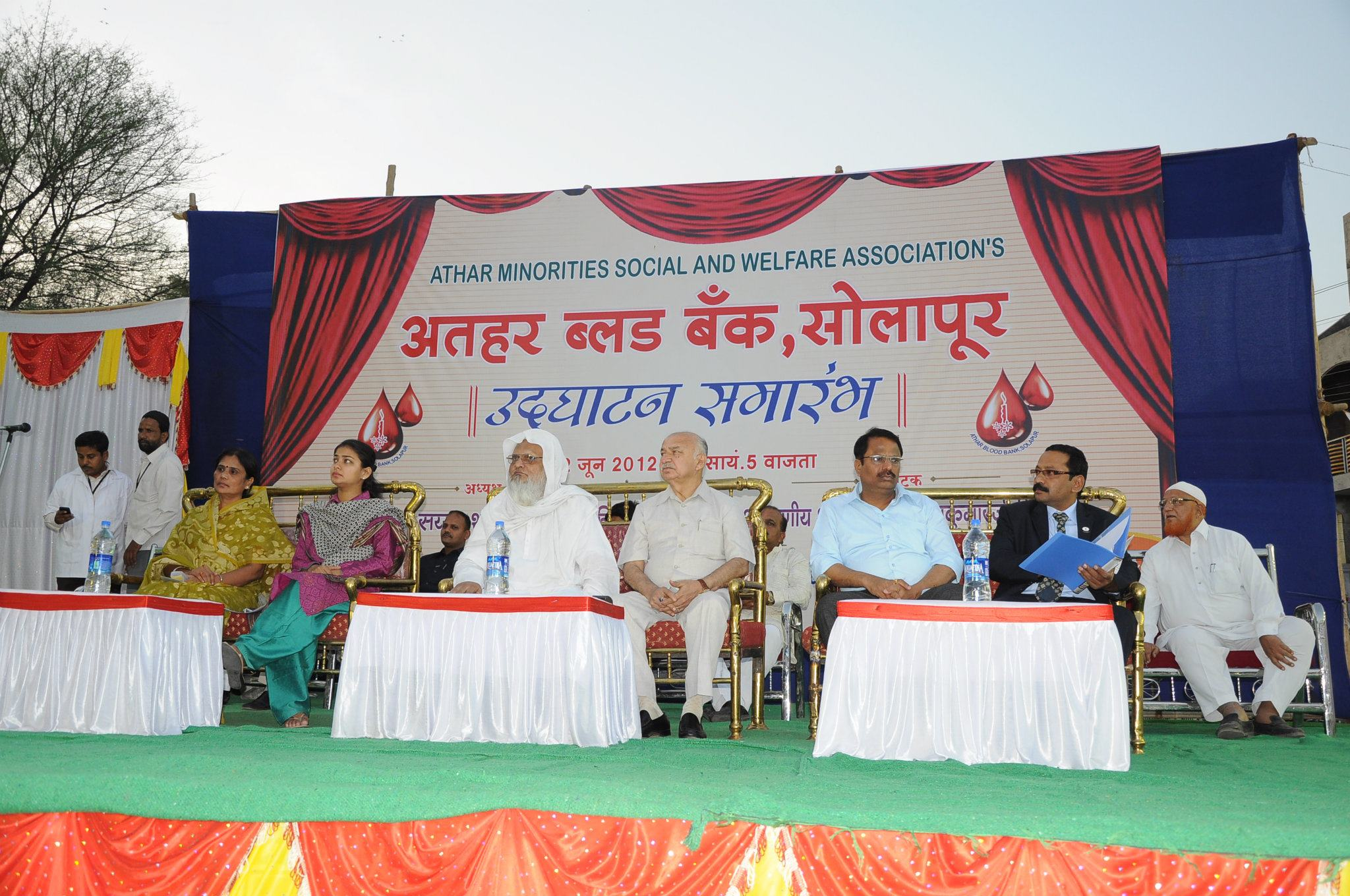
Athar Blood Bank Inauguration ceremony. (L-R) Alka Rathod, Praniti Shinde, Maulana Syed Shahabuddin Salfi Firdausi, Sushil Kumar Shinde, Dilip Rao Mane, Qayyum Inamdar

== Background ==
Athar Blood Bank was established in 2012 by a group of individuals mainly Maulana Syed Shahabuddin Salfi Firdausi, Qayyum Inamdar, Dr. Nilofer Bohri, Mushtaq Chaudhary, Abdul Razzaq Kamble, Azam Shaikh, Usman Mansoori, Mukhtar Humnabadi and few others.

== Blood collection center ==
The blood collection center on the 1st Floor, Jamiya complex, Near Samachar Chowk, Solapur, Maharashtra is equipped with all the latest equipment and can host multiple blood donations simultaneously. Eighteen staff, including three doctors, work at the center and has the capacity to store 700 units. It is operational 24*7 and supplies blood to Government Civil Hospital and Private Hospitals across Solapur district. The bank provides free blood to thalassemia and HIV patients. Also, financially weak sections are given discounted rate and sometimes they are not charged at all.

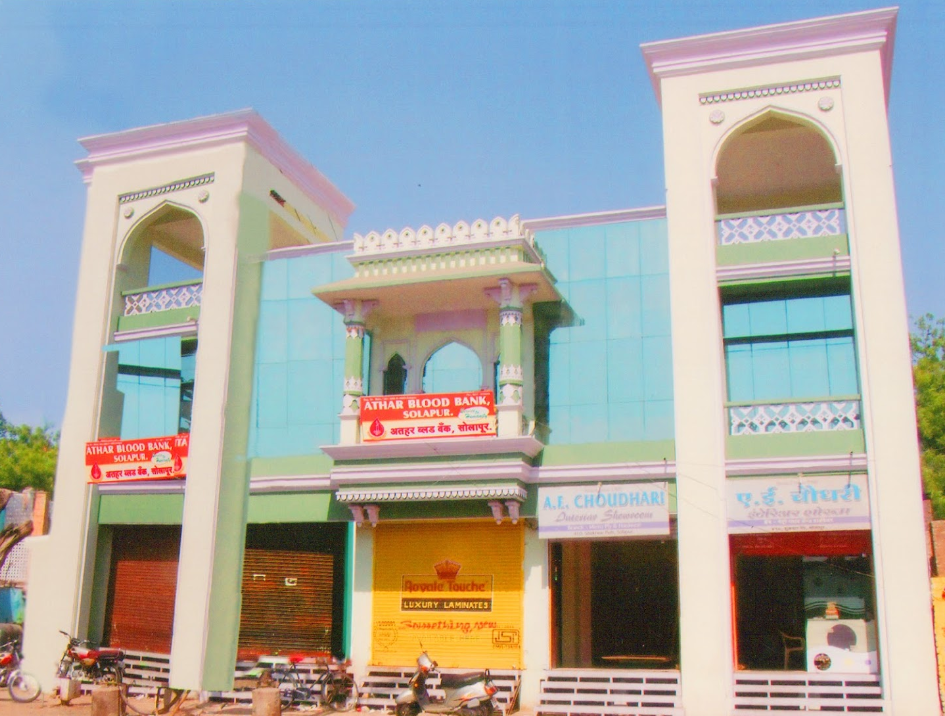
Athar Blood Bank (Exterior)

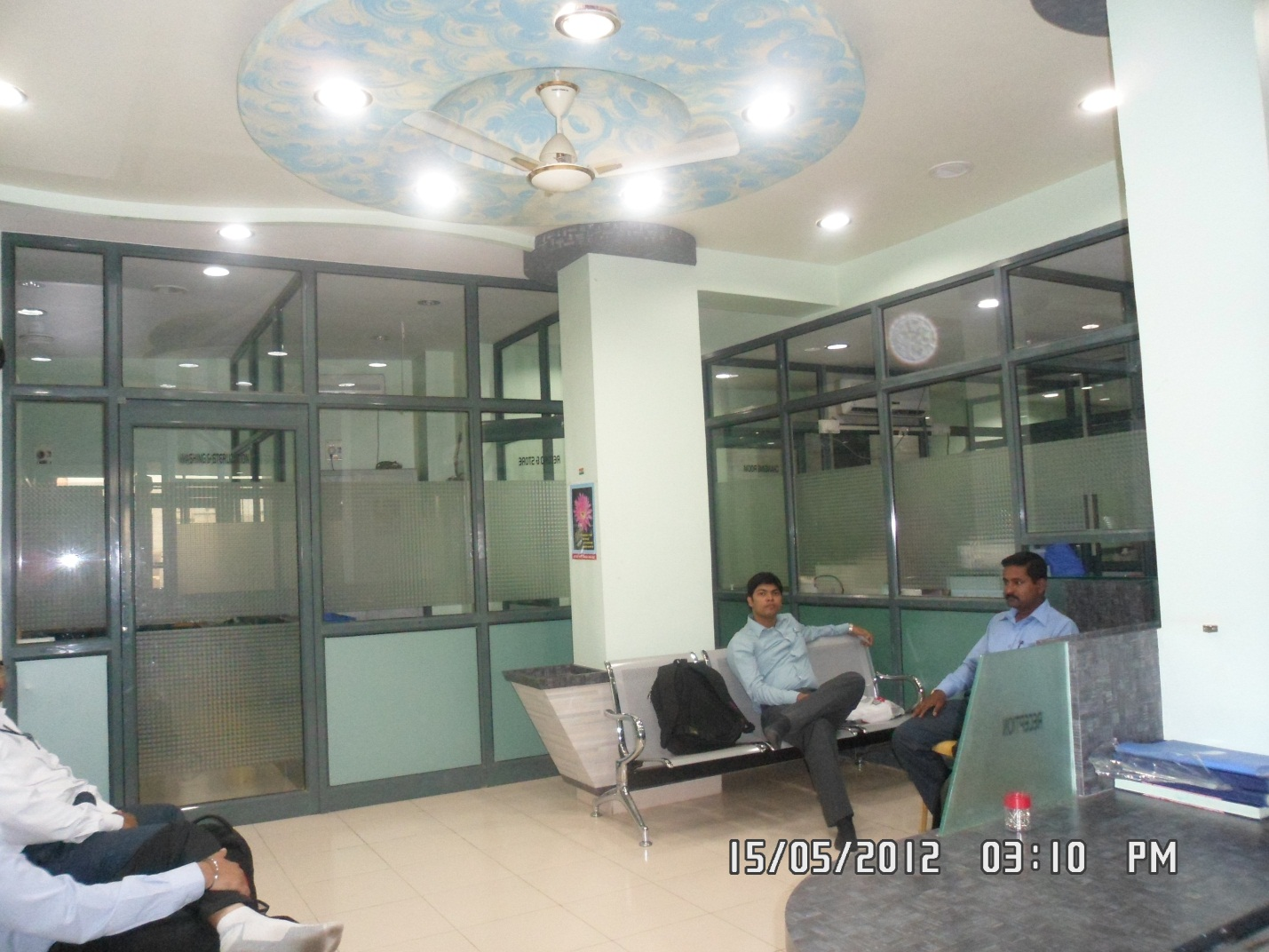
Athar Blood Bank (Interior)

== Camp ==
Athar Blood Bank collects blood from different groups e.g. colleges and public or private organizations, where any person can donate blood. The bank organizes an average of seven blood donation camps in a month. Blood is transported through an ambulance which also provides a mobile medical facility.

Recently 200 people have donated the blood in a camp organized by Jamiat-e-Ahle Hadeeths in Social School, Solapur.

== Processing of blood ==
The blood is processed in the lab having a state-of-art facility after the collection either from the center or camps. After initial screening blood is separated in major three components e.g. red cells, plasma and platelets.
