= Velindre Cancer Centre =

Cancer care facility in Cardiff, Wales

- Velindre University NHS Trust

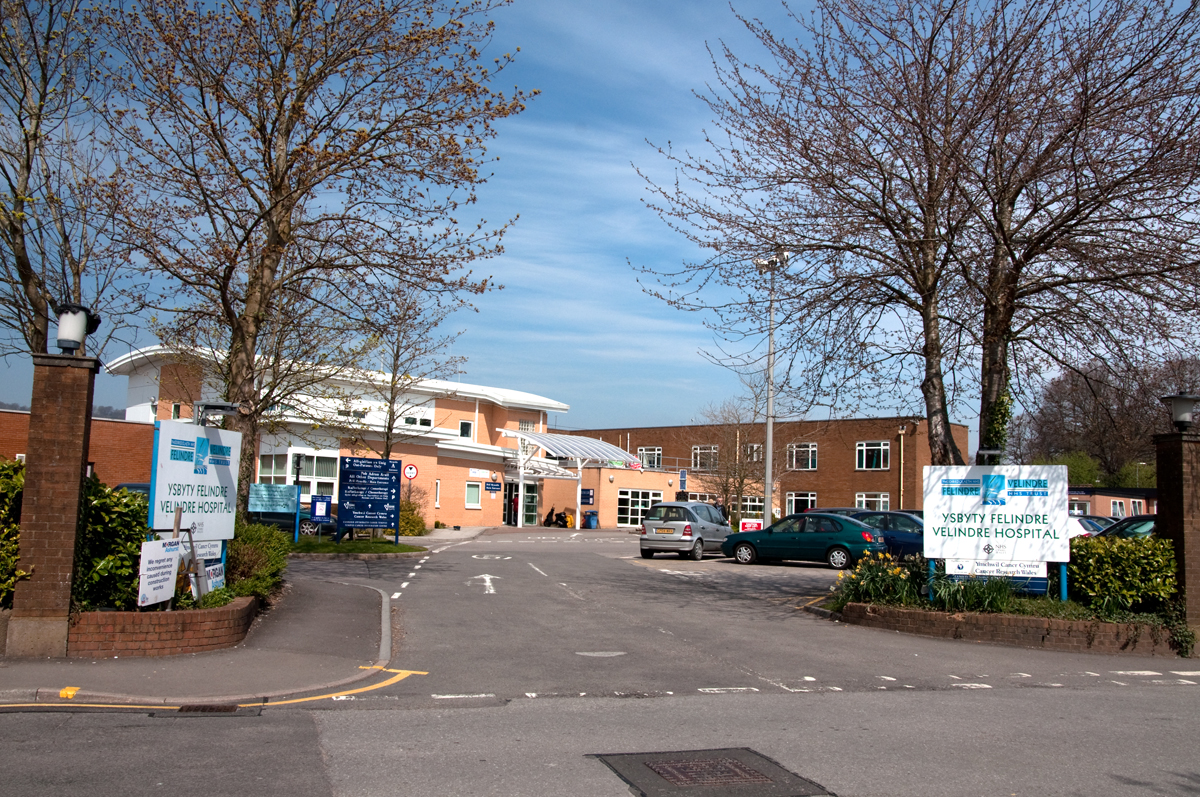
- Velindre Cancer Centre

- Shown in Cardiff

Geography
- Location: Cardiff, Wales, United Kingdom
- Coordinates: 51.5163°N 3.2283°W

Organisation
- Care system: NHS Wales
- Type: Specialist
- Affiliated university: Cardiff University

Services
- Emergency department: No Accident & Emergency
- Beds: 47
- Speciality: Cancer

History
- Founded: 1956

Links
- Lists: Hospitals in Wales

The Velindre Cancer Centre (Welsh: Canolfan Ganser Felindre) is a specialist facility offering inpatient and outpatient care for cancer patients in Whitchurch, Cardiff, Wales.

The site is currently managed and owned by the Velindre University NHS Trust, and was previously owned by the Cardiff and Vale University Health Board.

== History ==
The facility was established as Velindre Hospital in 1956. The name is a corruption of Melin Tref (transl. Mill Place). The first linear particle accelerator was installed in 1961.

The hospital became Velindre Cancer Centre in 1994 and a new radiotherapy unit opened in 2000.

A new Maggie's Centre, designed by Dow Jones Architects and funded by the Wales Government, opened in 2019.

In July 2022, the comedian Rhod Gilbert, who is a patron of the centre, announced that he was being treated for cancer at the centre.
