= Sankalp India Foundation =

- Lets Give Life a Better Chance
- Founded: 23 May 2003
- Founder: Students
- Type: Non-Government Voluntary Organisation
- Location: Bangalore
- Region served: India
- Website: http://www.sankalpindia.net

Sankalp India Foundation is a Bangalore-based non-government organisation. It is a youth organisation working for blood donation, thalassemia, bone marrow transplantation and disaster relief.

== Voluntary blood donation ==
Since 2003, it has been working for voluntary blood donation in Karnataka. A blood helpline is run by the organisation. It is one of the pioneer organisations which helps patients worldwide with a rare blood group, Bombay Blood Group (also known as hh blood group).

Sankalp India Foundation organizes several blood donation camps. It has conducted extensive work regarding the quality and safety of blood donation camps, studying the extent of non-compliance and adverse donor events blood banks in voluntary blood donation camps.

== Thalassemia management, prevention and care ==
Sankalp India Foundation runs several day care centers across South and West India for patients suffering from thalassemia and related blood disorders:

- Thal Day Care, Indira Gandhi Institute of Child Health, Bangalore
- Project Samraksha, Rashtrotthana Parishat, Bangalore
- Wenlock District Hospital, Mangalore
- Jai Shivshakti Center For Thalassemia, Jawaharlal Nehru Medical College, Belgaum
- Thalassemia and Sickle Cell Centre, Nagpur
- Radha Mohan Mehrotra Global Hospital Trauma Center, Abu Road
- Indian Red Cross Society, Nellore
- Sankalp Centre for Thalassemia Care, Rajkot
- Sarvoday Samarpan, Mumbai
- Shree Jalaram Abhuday Sadbhavana Trust, Ahmedabad
- Indian Red Cross Society, Eluru
- Mamata Foundation, Vijayawada
- KJ Somaiya Hospital, Mumbai
- Day care centre at RDT Hospital, Ananthapur is also part of the network.

Its StopThalassemia campaign is an initiative of Sankalp India Foundation to strengthen thalassemia prevention by focusing on antenatal screening. The campaign provides screening services to pregnant women and their husbands in the first trimester of their pregnancy. The following maternity centres are part of the campaign:

- Lady Goschen Hospital – Mangalore
- District Hospital – Tumkur
- Rural Development Trust - Bathalapalli – Ananthpur
- Viswa Bharathi Super Speciality Hospital - Kurnool
- Father Muller Medical College – Mangalore
- Daga Memorial Government Women Hospital - Nagpur

Sankalp India Foundation has been offering bone marrow transplantation for patients suffering from thalassemia. The organisation started the first bone marrow transplantation center In collaboration with People Tree Hospitals and Cure2Children Foundation, Italy in Bangalore in August 2015. In May 2017, the organisation has started a new bone marrow transplantation center in collaboration with Care Institute of Medical Science, Ahmedabad. In November 2017 Sankalp connected to MY Hospital, Indore for a new bone marrow transplantation program, which started in March 2018. a new centre started in June 2021 at Bhagwan Mahaveer Jain Hospital, Bangalore. The organisation performed more than 500 transplants for patients with thalassemia until December 2022.

== Disaster relief ==
The organization also participates in disaster relief activities. A few of the disasters in which it participated for relief are the Tsunami on the Indian sub continent, Karnataka floods, Sikkim earthquake, J&K earthquake, and the Assam floods.

== Achievements ==
- AmeriCares India's Spirit of Humanity Awards
  - Jury's Choice, 2011
  - Thalassemia category, 2014
  - Child care category, 2016
- Manthan Award Asia Pacific, e-Health category, 2013
- eNgo Challenge winner, South Asia Organizational Efficiency category, 2014
