= Blood donation in India =

Blood donations in India are conducted by organisations and hospitals through blood donation camps. Donors can also visit blood banks in hospitals to donate blood. Efforts by the government and advocacy groups over the years have helped bridge the gap between demand and supply. The regulatory framework for blood donation and blood bank management rests with the Central Drugs Standard Control Organisation, while technical bodies like the National Blood Transfusion Council and National AIDS Control Organisation formulate guidelines and recommendations for transfusion medicine and blood bank management. Challenges persist with regard to regulation of blood banks and transfusion practices as the sector is largely fragmented with uneven distribution of blood banks and supply of blood in parts of the country. Donors are usually provided with refreshments after the procedure, which include glucose drinks, biscuits and fruits. Some organisations offer transportation facilities, as well as certificates or badges as gratitude.

== History ==
The history of voluntary blood donation in India dates back to 1942 during the Second World War when blood donors were required to help the wounded soldiers. The first blood bank was established in Kolkata, West Bengal in March 1939 by Shiv Deval Singh Greval at the All India Institute of Hygiene and Public Health and was managed by the Red Cross. The donors were mostly government employees and people from the Anglo-Indian community who donated blood for a humanitarian cause. The number of voluntary donors declined after the war and donors had to be paid for the blood. Leela Moolgaonkar, a social reformer, initiated voluntary blood donation camps in Mumbai from 1954. The 1960s saw many blood banks open in different cities. In 1975, the Indian Society of Blood Transfusion and Immunohaematology headed by J. G. Jolly declared 1 October as the National Voluntary Blood Donation Day.

The HIV pandemic in the 1980s led to the government setting up the National AIDS Control Organisation (NACO) in 1992 to oversee the policies in preventing the spread of AIDS. Subsequently, the National AIDS Control Programme was launched which led to improvements in patient screening and hygienic transfusion procedures. A public interest litigation was filed in the Supreme Court in 1996 to abolish the practice of selling blood which became effective on 1 January 1998. This led to a temporary shortage of blood as voluntary donations were still relatively low. The NACO in 2002 adopted the WHO Guidelines on the Clinical Use of Blood. Selling or donating blood in exchange for money is illegal under the National Blood Transfusion Services Act 2007 and those found convicted may face a prison sentence of up to three months with fine. A petition was filed in the Supreme Court in March 2021 challenging the blood donation guidelines that prohibits transgender people, members of the gay community and sex workers from donating blood.

== Criteria to donate blood ==
There are several parameters that determine the eligibility of an individual to donate blood. Guidelines laid down by the Ministry of Health, Government of India have to be followed by blood banks for donor screening.

Overall health and vital signs:

- The donor must be fit and healthy, and should not be suffering from transmittable diseases.
- Age and weight- Between 18 and 65 years old and should weigh a minimum of 45 kg.
- Pulse rate- Between 50 and 100 without irregularities.
- Hemoglobin level- A minimum of 12.5 g/dL.
- Blood pressure- Diastolic: 60–90 mm Hg, Systolic: 100–140 mm Hg.
- Body temperature- Should be normal, with an oral temperature not exceeding 37.5 °C.
- The time period between successive blood donations should be more than 90 days.

Individuals under certain conditions are deemed ineligible to donate blood:

- Have been tested HIV positive.
- Suffering from ailments like cardiac arrest, cancer, epilepsy, kidney ailments and hemoglobinopathies.
- Have asthma with active symptoms, and severe asthma patients.
- Had fits, tuberculosis or allergic disorders in the past few years.
- Pregnant or breastfeeding women.
- Consumed alcohol in the past 6 hours.
- Underwent immunization in the past 1 month.
- Underwent major dental procedures or general surgeries in the past 6-12 month.
- Have had ear/body piercing or tattoo in the past year.
- Treated for rabies in the past year.
- Women who have had miscarriage in the past 6 months.

== Clinical demand ==
The number of voluntary blood donors increased from 54.4% in 2006–2007 to 83.1% in 2011–2012, with the number of blood units increasing from 4.4 million units in 2006–2007 to 9.3 million units in 2012–2013. In 2016, the Ministry of Health and Family Welfare reported a donation of 10.9 million units against a requirement of 12 million units. In 2018 the Ministry of Health and Family Welfare with support from its various institutions published a detailed report on the blood requirement in India. 12.7 million units were donated in 2020, lower than projected due to the COVID-19 pandemic. A study in 2022 extrapolated the eligible donor population in India at 402 million. The supply was estimated at 33.8 donations against the demand of 36.3 per thousand donations, translating to a shortage of one million units annually. Medical specialty had the highest demand for blood at 6.0 million units (41.2%), followed by surgery 4.1 million (27.9%), obstetrics and gynecology 3.3 million (22.4%) and pediatrics 1.2 million (8.5%).

== Regulatory mechanisms ==
Human blood is covered under the definition of drug under the Drugs and Cosmetics Act, 1940. Blood bank activities are regulated under this act and they are required to obtain timely renewal of the license from Drug Controller General for operation and have to comply with the terms presented in the license. It specifies accommodation, manpower, equipment, supplies and reagents, good manufacturing practices, and process control to be followed in Indian blood transfusion services. Dual licensing of blood banks by federal and state regulatory bodies was made mandatory in 1993, with a renewal required every 5 years. NABH is the main accreditation body for hospitals and blood banks in the country. The National Haemovigilance Programme was launched in 2012 to monitor adverse transfusion reactions, and subsequently in 2015 the National Blood Donor Vigilance Programme was initiated.

The National AIDS Control Organisation (NACO) was formed in 1992 following the outbreak of AIDS. Following public interest litigation, a verdict by the supreme court in the case of Common Cause vs. the Union of India in January 1992 led to the establishment of the National Blood Transfusion Council (NBTC) at the federal level and State Blood Transfusion Councils (SBTC) for all the states to review the status of blood transfusion services in the country and conduct annual monitoring visits to blood banks. While the regulatory authority is entrusted with the task of drug regulation, NACO and NBTC are the technical bodies that frame guidelines for the practice of transfusion medicine. In 2018, an expert working group of the NBTC proposed recommendations on manpower requirements for blood banks, which outlined the minimum number of staff at blood banks and their qualifications.

The Government of India in 2002 published the National Blood Policy to reiterate the commitment to safe blood and blood components. It documents the strategies for making available adequate resources, technology, and training for improving transfusion services apart from outlining methods for donor motivation and appropriate clinical use of blood by clinicians. It has also taken steps for research and development in transfusion medicine. There have been recommendations to include blood under the National List of Essential Medicines to control pricing transparency and affordability of blood. The fragmented nature of organisational types that conduct blood donations, along with advancements in transfusion science and new practices in blood bank management technology have prompted calls from academics to review and amend the Drugs and Cosmetics Act from time to time.

== Organisations ==
India has government-funded and private blood donation organisations. Some major organisations operate in many regions throughout the country while others are regional and operate with local support. Along with conducting blood donation camps, they also raise awareness on voluntary blood donation and public health. Most organisations maintain online portals or physical registry where donors can enter their details and receive updates when blood donation drives are conducted; this also facilitates a network between blood donors and organisations/hospitals. Apart from such organisations, major hospitals in the country have their own blood banks where blood donation is conducted within the facility. As of 2015, there were 2.2 blood banks per million population in the country. As per a 2016 study, around 51% of the 2493 blood banks surveyed across the country had component separation facility.

== Issues in blood donation ==
Despite a huge population, the demand-supply gap for blood units persists in many healthcare facilities in the country. As of 2022 the annual shortage of blood is estimated at one million units.

=== Blood banks ===
A study conducted between 2009 and 2013 concluded a high rate of non-compliance on the part of blood banks on the quality and safety of transfusion services. Cases of transmission of infective diseases like AIDS due to substandard medical facilities and practices in blood banks continue to be relatively high. The National Blood Policy outlines the requirement for primary healthcare centres to have 24/7 service for blood transfusion, but over 80% of them lack blood storage facility. With the sector being largely unorganized and fragmented, and lack of communication between hospitals with no real-time centralized data on availability of blood units between them, there have been instances of shortage of blood at hospitals being a major factor in deaths caused by time-critical events such as accidents.

=== Donors ===
Disparities in access of donors in regions have led to wastage of blood stock in some parts of the country, while at the same time creating a shortage of blood in some other parts. Voluntary blood donation comprises about 70% of the blood demand, with the rest coming from replacement donors, whereas 62 nations in the world fulfill their blood demands through voluntary donations. Anaemia is also reported as a major cause of deferral in blood donation, accounting for up to 77.9% of female and up to 37% of male deferrals. Other hurdles in increasing voluntary blood donation include the fear of pain and weakness after the procedure, and illiteracy.

=== Other issues ===
Documented instances of forced blood extraction have occurred in India, among other countries, owing to its disproportionate ratio of available supply of blood and high poverty rate. One such ring gained national attention in 2008 when an emaciated man escaped from his captors near the city of Gorakhpur, in Uttar Pradesh. Blood donations reduced during the COVID-19 pandemic, primarily due to restrictions on travel and fear of contracting the disease at healthcare centres.

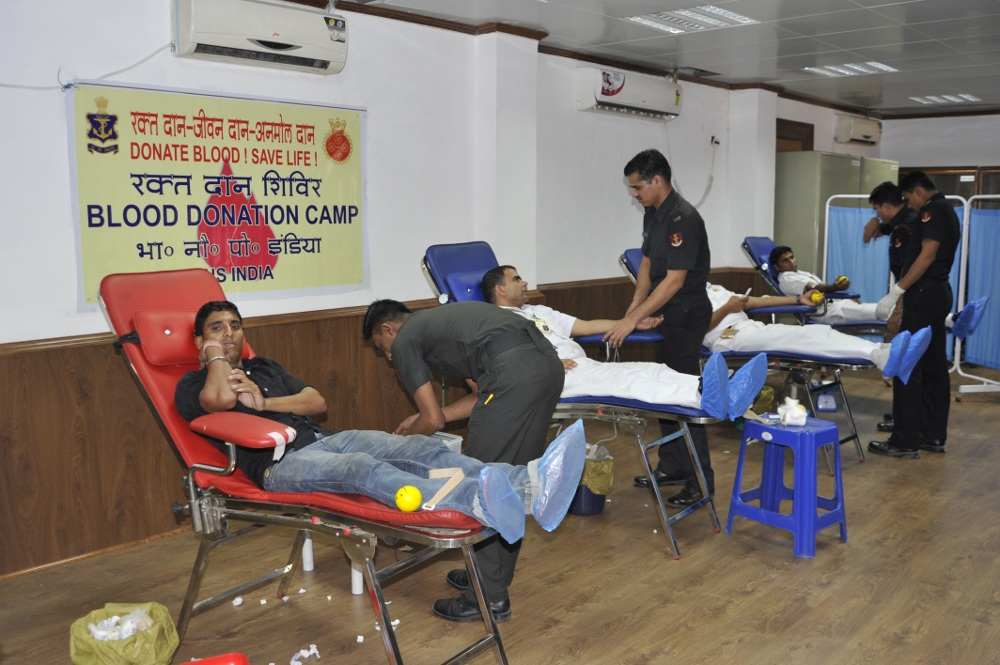
Blood donation camp in New Delhi

== Initiatives to encourage blood donation ==
1 October is celebrated as the national voluntary blood donation day. Blood donation agencies often organize workshops to educate people about the benefits of donating blood. With a huge population of youth, blood donation drives are conducted by hospitals and organisations at college campuses. Blood donors and their family members are often given priority in case of emergency or accidents. 32 mobile blood banks were introduced in 2010 to facilitate donation in remote regions. In 2016, the government launched an initiative called E-RaktKosh (Rakt: blood, Kosh: repository), a web-based mechanism that integrates all blood banks in the state into a single network, providing information about blood camps and the availability of blood in hospitals throughout the country. A mobile application for the E-RaktKosh portal was launched in 2020 to improve accessibility.

== See also ==
- List of blood donation agencies
