= Visceral: The Poetry of Blood =

2018 poetry collection by RJ Arkhipov

- Author: RJ Arkhipov
- Language: English
- Genre: Poetry
- Publisher: Zuleika
- Publication date: 14 June 2018
- Publication place: United Kingdom
- Media type: Hardcover 4to
- ISBN: 978-1-9996232-0-3

Visceral, full title Visceral: The Poetry of Blood, is a collection of poems by the Welsh poet RJ Arkhipov, first published by Zuleika on World Blood Donor Day in 2018 when Arkhipov was 26 years old. A miscellany of verse, essays, and photographs, Visceral was Arkhipov's first published book and cemented his name as a poet.

The first poems of the collection were written in 2015 and were controversial for having been written using the author's own blood as ink in protest of the MSM blood donor controversy in the United Kingdom. In 2018, the renowned British sculptor Ian Rank-Broadley completed a portrait bust of the Welsh poet RJ Arkhipov. Arkhipov's experience with the sculptor inspired his poem, The Sculptor, which features among the poems in Visceral. In June 2019, Visceral was long-listed for the Polari First Book Prize. In November 2019, the French president Emmanuel Macron invited Arkhipov to the Élysée Palace to present his book to the library of the President of France and the First Lady of France.

== Form and content ==
Noted by literary critics for its unorthodox hardback binding and quarto trim size, Arkhipov himself described Visceral as 'a living, breathing, pulsing body of work through which the poetry of blood courses'. The book is divided into six parts which the author describes as the work's 'organs' or 'viscera'. Each of the six chapters of Visceral contains four poems which are introduced by an essay outlining the chapter's theme and its connection with blood.

Arkhipov chose a stanza from Pablo Neruda's poem La Palabra as the epigraph of Visceral. The book's foreword was written by the prominent sculptor Ian Rank-Broadley.

Nació
la palabra en la sangre,
creció en el cuerpo oscuro, palpitando,
y voló con los labios y la boca.

— Pablo Neruda, From "La Palabra", Plenos Poderes (1962).

Several of the poems within the book are examples of concrete poetry. In the erotic poem O, Arkhipov eschews the left-to-right writing system, opting instead to write the lines of the poem as a series concentric circles. The poem Perfect Lovers consists of two haiku, the lines of which are arranged as the hands of two adjacent clocks, mimicking an eponymous work of installation art by Félix González-Torres in which the artist placed two clocks side-by-side. Other poems within the book are inspired by the constrained writing techniques of Oulipo. For example, the poem A Nation's Ritual is an anagram poem written using only the letters in the naturalisation notice of the author's grandfather.

Visceral is illustrated with photographs conceived by Arkhipov and captured by French photographer Maud Maillard. The photographs were shot at Maxim's, a famous Art Nouveau restaurant in Paris founded in 1893. Described by a critic as 'mixing vaudevillian homoeroticism with the incongruously macabre', many of the book's photographs portray the author using his own blood as an artistic medium. In the dust jacket, the author is depicted 'shirtlessly re-enacting Alice in Wonderland', painting a spray of white roses red with his own blood.

- Abjection: Disturbance & Rejection
  - XY
  - Broken
  - The Offing
  - No Strings Attached
- Ancestry: Belonging & Identity
  - Inside
  - Stargazing
  - A Nation's Ritual
  - Inheritance
- Faith: Religion & Ritual
  - Baptism
  - Ceremony
  - Hide
  - Ineffable
- Intimacy
  - Fingertips
  - O
  - Whiskey
  - The Moon Perfectly Halved
- Mortality
  - Arthur
  - The Sculptor
  - Rough Seas
  - Perfect Lovers
- Stigma
  - Inkwell
  - Afterwards
  - Vernacular
  - Beyond Blood
