= Hussaini Blood Bank =

Husaini Blood Bank
- Founded: 1979
- Founder: Dr. Hasan Ali Vajid
- Type: Blood bank
- Purpose: Voluntary Blood Donations
- Location: Karachi, Pakistan
- Region served: Nationwide
- Owner: Husaini Haematology and Oncology Trust
- Website: www.husaini.org

Husaini Blood Bank (HBB) is a public health organization with its headquarter at Karachi and working for the welfare of the people of Pakistan via its sub offices and affiliated department/NGOs all over the country. HBB was founded in 1979 by Dr Hasan Ali Vajid with the establishment of Husaini Haematology and Oncology Trust inside his Clinic at Soldier Bazar Karachi through the support of Mr Hamid D. Habib, the chairman of Habib Trusts and started blood collection and donation at a very small scale.

HBB is a registered blood bank with Sind Blood Transfusion Authority and maintain over 26 branches across the country having affiliation with the American Association of Blood Banking and Pakistan Medical Research Council, besides Baqai University & Karachi University research projects it also trains students of Dow University.

In addition to health diagnostic lab facilities, Hussaini Blood Bank also organizes seminars/workshops, to mark World Health Organization (WHO) Days for public awareness, besides blood donation campaigns

The Indus Motor Company donates PKR 200,000 annually to Husaini Haematology and Oncology Trust, a non-profit health organization.

Besides, safe blood and blood components service, the trust also runs a thalassaemia centre. HBB services have also been obtained by the first online healthcare mobile app in Pakistan.

== Quality of service ==
The services of trust are certified by the College of American Pathologists and European External Quality Assurance Services, its lab equipments qualify Food and Drug Administration approved PCR based NAT screening system

== Blood to thalassemia centers ==
Besides other difficulties emerged due to lock-down imposed amid Coronavirus out-break, COVID-19 epidemic situation created an extreme shortage of blood at various blood banks, including the Hussaini Blood Bank for provision to patients haemophilia/thalassaemia at different thalassemia centers
