= Velindre University NHS Trust =

The Velindre University NHS Trust (Welsh: Ymddiriedolaeth GIG Prifysgol Felindre) is an NHS Wales trust established in 1994 as a specialist provider of cancer services in Wales. It runs the Velindre Cancer Centre and the Welsh Blood Service. It also incorporates, on a hosted basis, the NHS Wales Shared Services Partnership (NWSSP).

The Velindre Cancer Centre in Cardiff provides radiotherapy treatment. It provides stereotactic body radiotherapy treatment and a stereotactic radiosurgery service. A Varian TrueBeam linear accelerator which delivers stereotactic radiosurgery was funded by a £4.6 million Welsh Government investment in 2015.

When inspected in 2014, the Velindre Cancer Centre was generally praised.

A clinical trials unit was set up in 1994 with three members of staff. In 2014 that had expanded to 34, with more than 9,700 patients having been recruited for clinical trials.

The trust was awarded university status by the Welsh Government in 2018.
