= Youth For Blood =

Non-profit for blood donors in Nepal

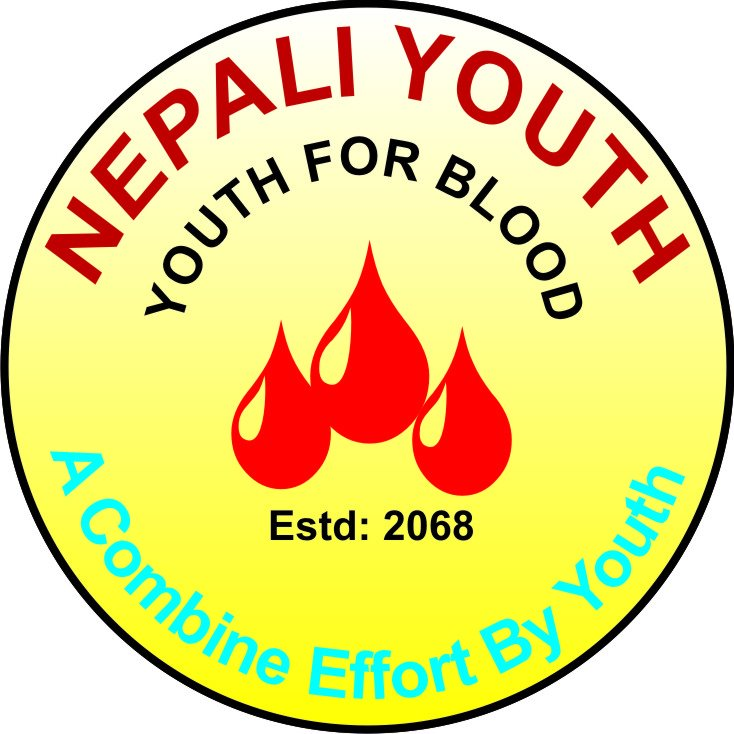
- Founded: 2011
- Founder: Saroj Karki
- Type: NGO
- Registration no.: Nepal (2651)
- Location: Biratnagar -14, Roadsesh Chow, Balabhadra Highway, Nepal
- Origins: Biratnagar, Nepal
- Region served: National
- President: Sabin Dahal
- Website: www.youthforblood.org
- Formerly called: Nepali Youth: Youth For Blood

Youth For Blood (YFB) is a youth-led, non-profit, and service motivated circle of youths devoted to the welfare of blood donors and seekers in Nepal. Established in 2011 in Biratnagar, it has extended its network to 13 different cities and is still growing. One of the main objective of the organization is to manage fresh blood for people in need for free: YFB has saved over 4500 lives by managing over 6000 pints of blood and 3000 standby donors. Currently, YFB has a network of more than 50,000 blood donors throughout Nepal, 15,000 of which are registered blood donors while the remaining are people who can be reached through social networks.

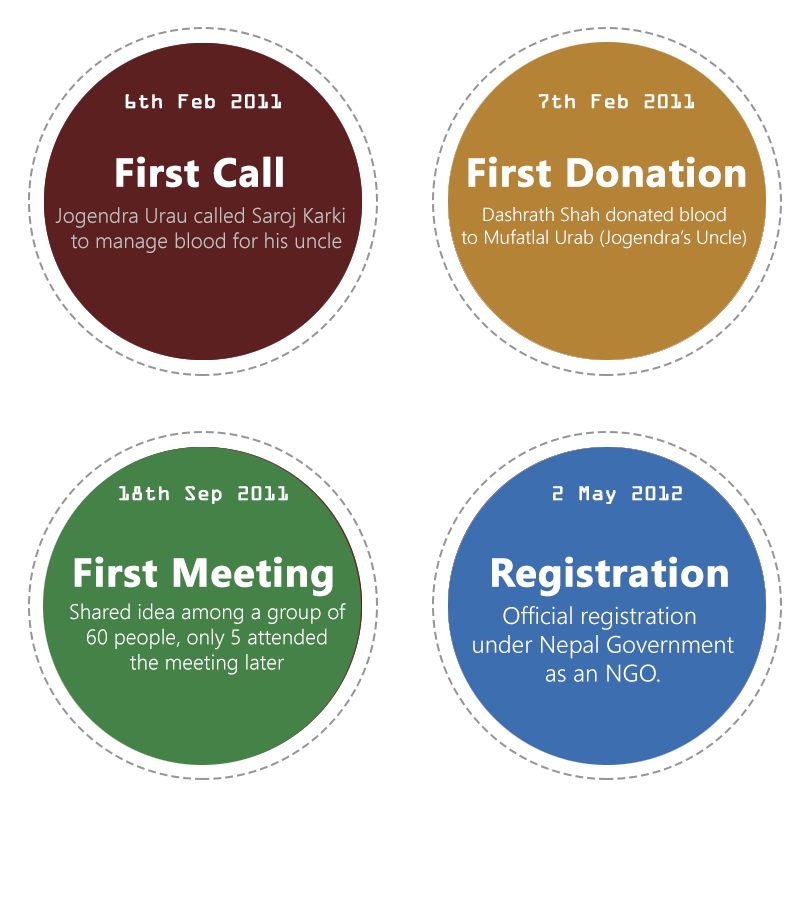
Starting Timeline of YFB

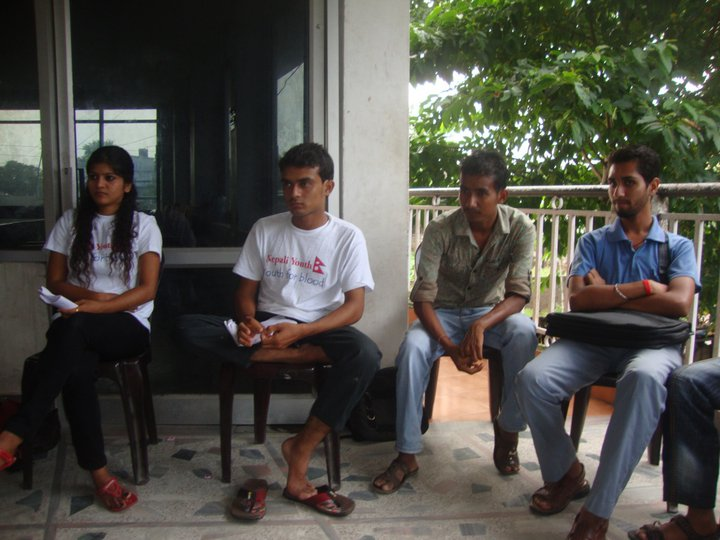
4th Meeting of YFB at Federation of Nepalese Journalist's Building, Biratnagar

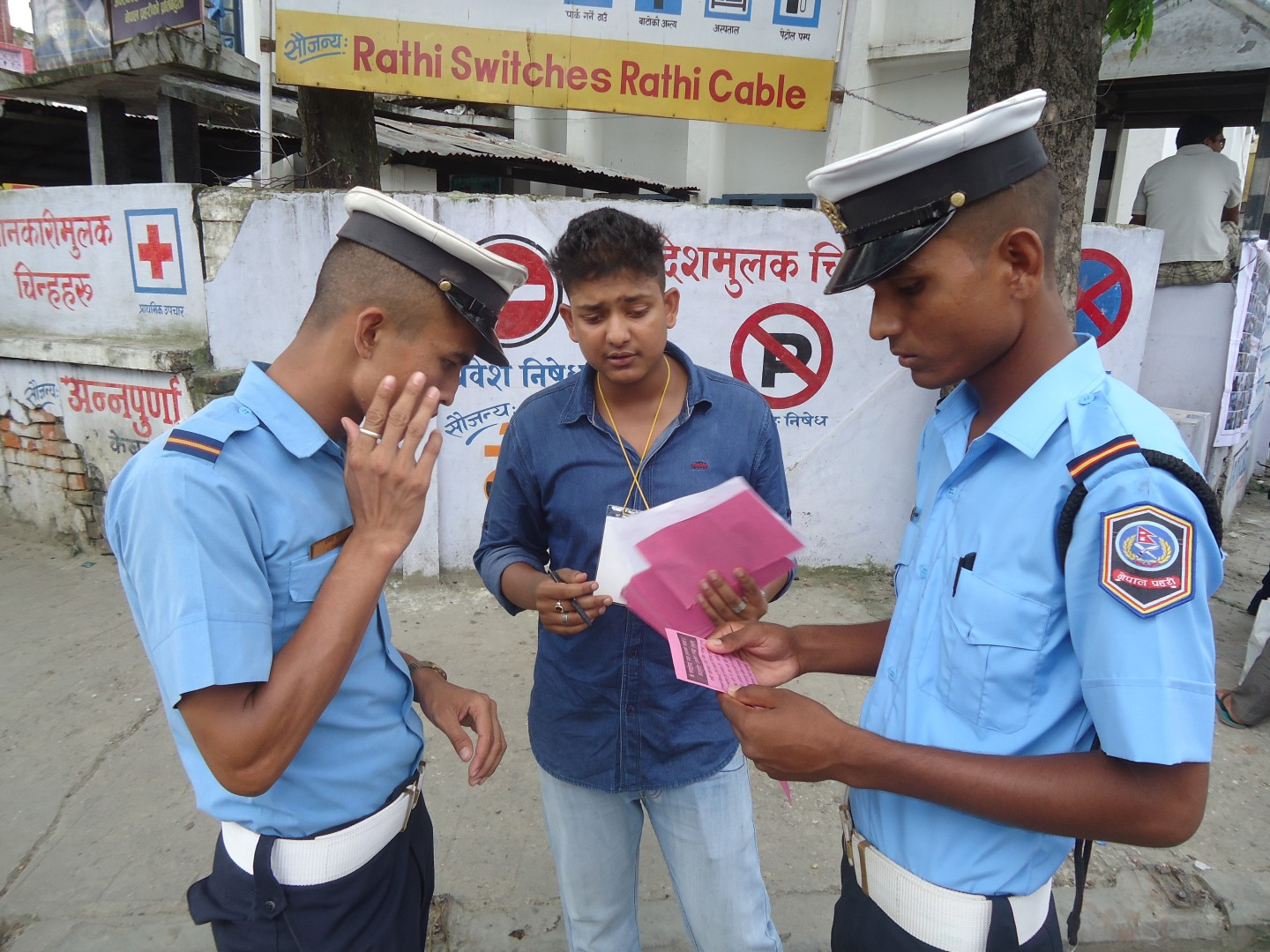
Street Blood Awareness Campaign

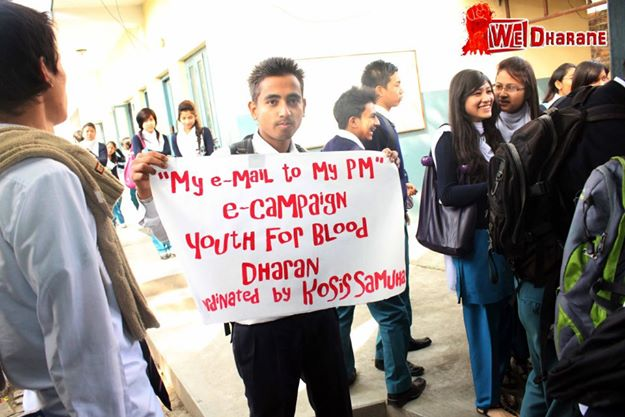
'My Email to My PM' Campaign to pressurized government to lower service charge of blood

== Origins ==
Youth For Blood was established after a real event that took place with two college students named Saroj Karki and his friend Jogendra Urau. On the night of 27 May 2011, Jogendra Urau was in need of blood for his maternal uncle, who was suffering from tuberculosis. He tried his best to manage blood for his uncle but could not succeed alone. He then made a call to his colleague Saroj Karki and asked for some help. Karki made many attempts to manage blood or a blood donor but he too was unsuccessful. After so many efforts, on next day, while Karki was travelling to his office, he met one of his colleagues named Dashrath Shah. Karki asked him about his blood group. In reply, Shah said he belongs to the same group that Urau's uncle needed. Next day while Shah was on his way to office, Karki met him. Karki described the entire situation to him. Shah, considering the sensitivity of the situation agreed to donate blood. Soon Shah donated blood. This was the first successful coordination of Youth For Blood but yet YFB was not officially registered.

=== Starting Days ===
After managing blood for his friend’s uncle, Saroj Karki felt a need an organization that hel. He realized that this could be one of the ways to serve the society and felt this must be made a campaign. Karki launched a Facebook page named Youth For Blood and started to facilitate blood for other needy people with the help of social media. The page helped conduct online facilitation of blood till the registration of Youth For Blood. After one month of solitary efforts, Karki shared this campaign in a group of 60 colleagues and asked to join him but only four colleagues in the group positively responded. After that, they actively continued the campaign. They started meeting regularly and also tried to persuade and influence others to come and join them. A young energetic service motive team full of determination, dedication formed. Due to the lack of resources, they held their meetings at different public places of Biratnagar like Aarohan Gurukul (a Theatre), Paropakar Ghat (a Graveyard), Shahid Rangasala (a Stadium), etc. Finally, at last they succeed to register themselves as a legal social organization with ad hoc President Nirmal Sharma.

== Chapters ==
1. Chitwan
2. Jhapa
3. Kathmandu
4. Lalitpur
5. Morang
6. Rupandehi
7. Siraha
8. Sunsari

== Awards ==
- South Asian eNGO Award for best social media Social Media Usage (2012)

== Sources ==
- Feature News on Kathmandu Post
- Feature on Kantipur Television
- Report on 'Hello Sukrabar'
- News Report on Nepal Weekly
