= Bloodmobile =

Mobile blood donation centre

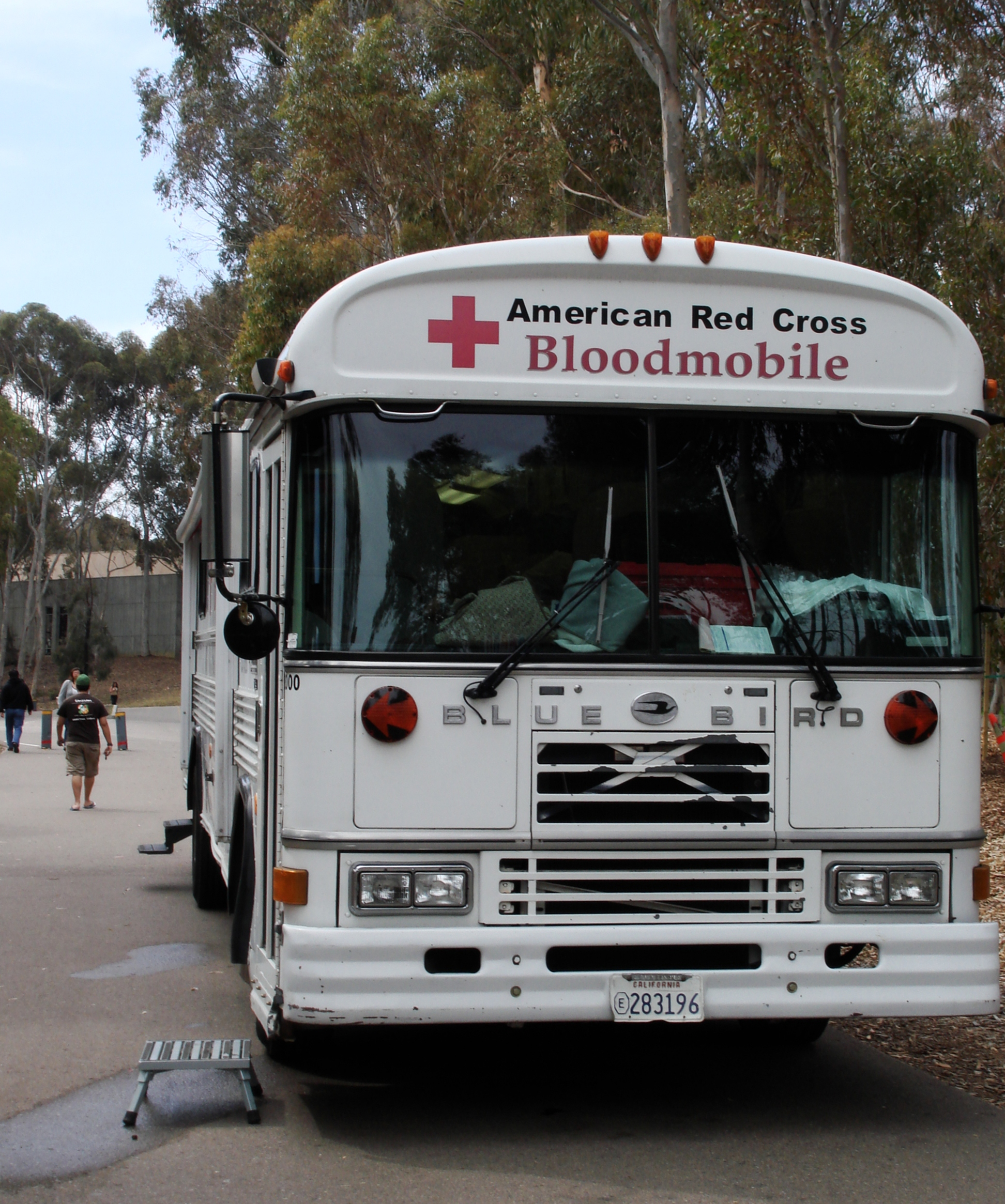
American Red Cross bloodmobile at the University of California, San Diego.

A bloodmobile is a mobile blood donation center. It is a vehicle (usually a bus or a large van) equipped with everything necessary for a blood donation procedure. Blood drives involving bloodmobiles usually happen in public places such as colleges and churches.

Often large employers will sponsor mobile blood drives and allow employees a few hours off of work to donate blood. In addition, many high schools hold annual blood drives which allow students aged 16 and over to donate blood with a signed permission form. Typically students are offered snacks, T-shirts, or time out of class as an incentive, as well as positive peer pressure.

== How a bloodmobile worked in the 1950s ==
The first bloodmobiles were created by Dr. Charles Drew, an African-American leader in the field, in 1941, making it particularly ironic that African-American blood was first rejected and then accepted only when kept separate from White blood.

By the 1950s the American Red Cross ran mobile blood units that gave people a community-based location at which to donate. These mobile units were very efficient, with a large Red Cross truck staffed by two men arriving at an empty location and setting up for the first donation, which would be taken two hours later. The truck would be loaded with at least ten beds, mattresses, dozens of screens and chairs, waste receptacles, tables, stools, huge refrigerated boxes, canvas bags of ice, coffee urns, orange juice, canteen equipment, hundreds of blood bottles, boxes of sterile supplies, bottles of solution, literature and record forms, oxygen tanks, and sheets. The men would have this unloaded and set up on site in less than an hour.

Once setup was complete, nurses, volunteers and doctors arrived. There were normally six nurses and 15 volunteers. The nurses did their preliminary tasks while the volunteers split off into groups. One group unpacked and set up the reception area. Another group set up the canteen and prepared food for after donations. The third group set up the blood bottle table where the blood would be tagged, numbered, and recorded.

When the site opened, donors would enter via the reception area to answer questionnaires which determined whether they were eligible to donate. Once accepted, a donor was taken through to the nurse, who would take blood pressure and perform other tests. The donor then went to the next nurse, who took the blood. If the donor had a reaction while donating, they went to the recovery room where they went under the care of the doctor until they had fully recovered. If the donor did not have a reaction, they would go to the canteen for refreshments.

In the 1950s, mobile blood units like this would collect from 200 donors in six hours.

== Gallery ==
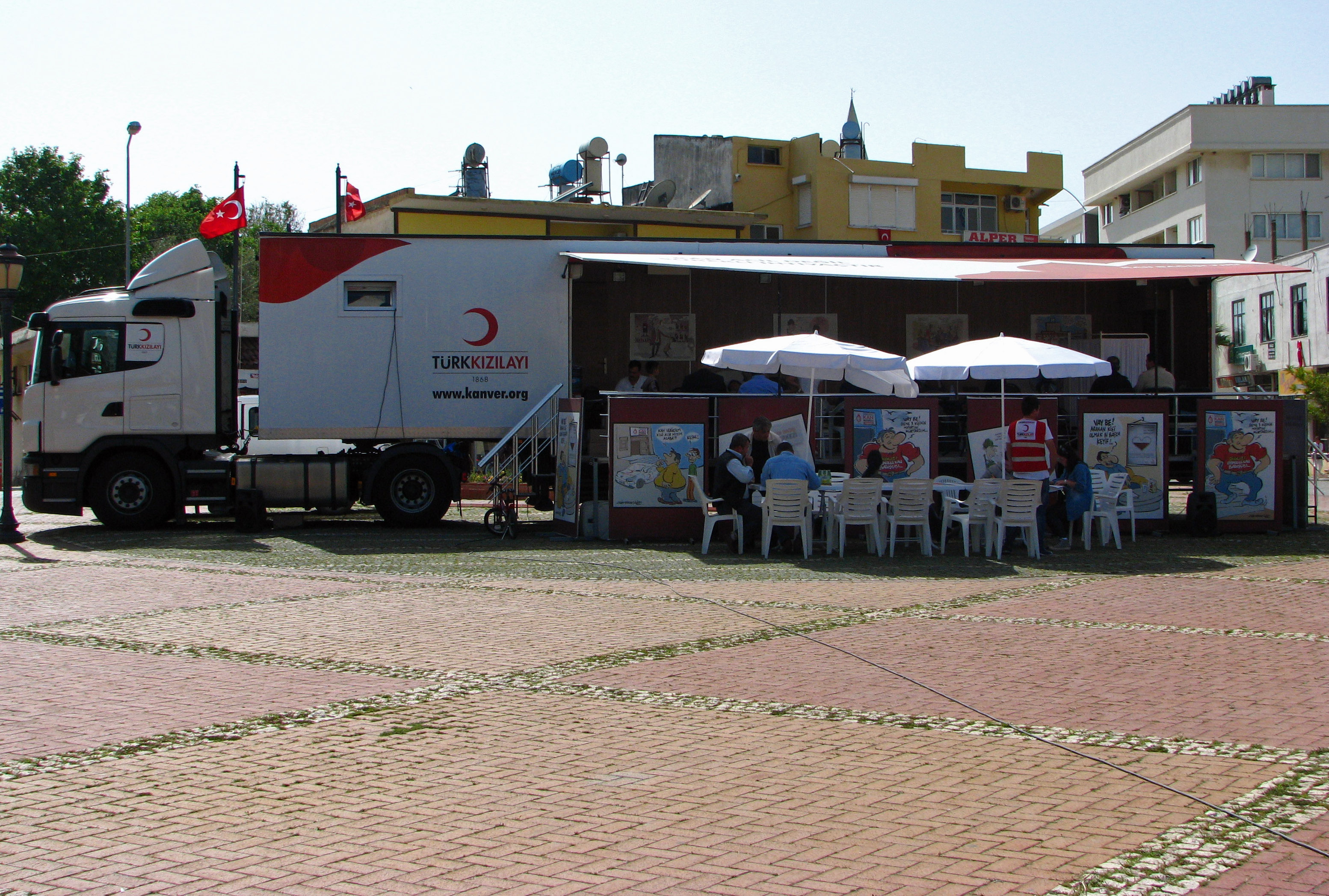
A bloodmobile of Turkish Red Crescent in Gazipaşa, Antalya, Turkey.

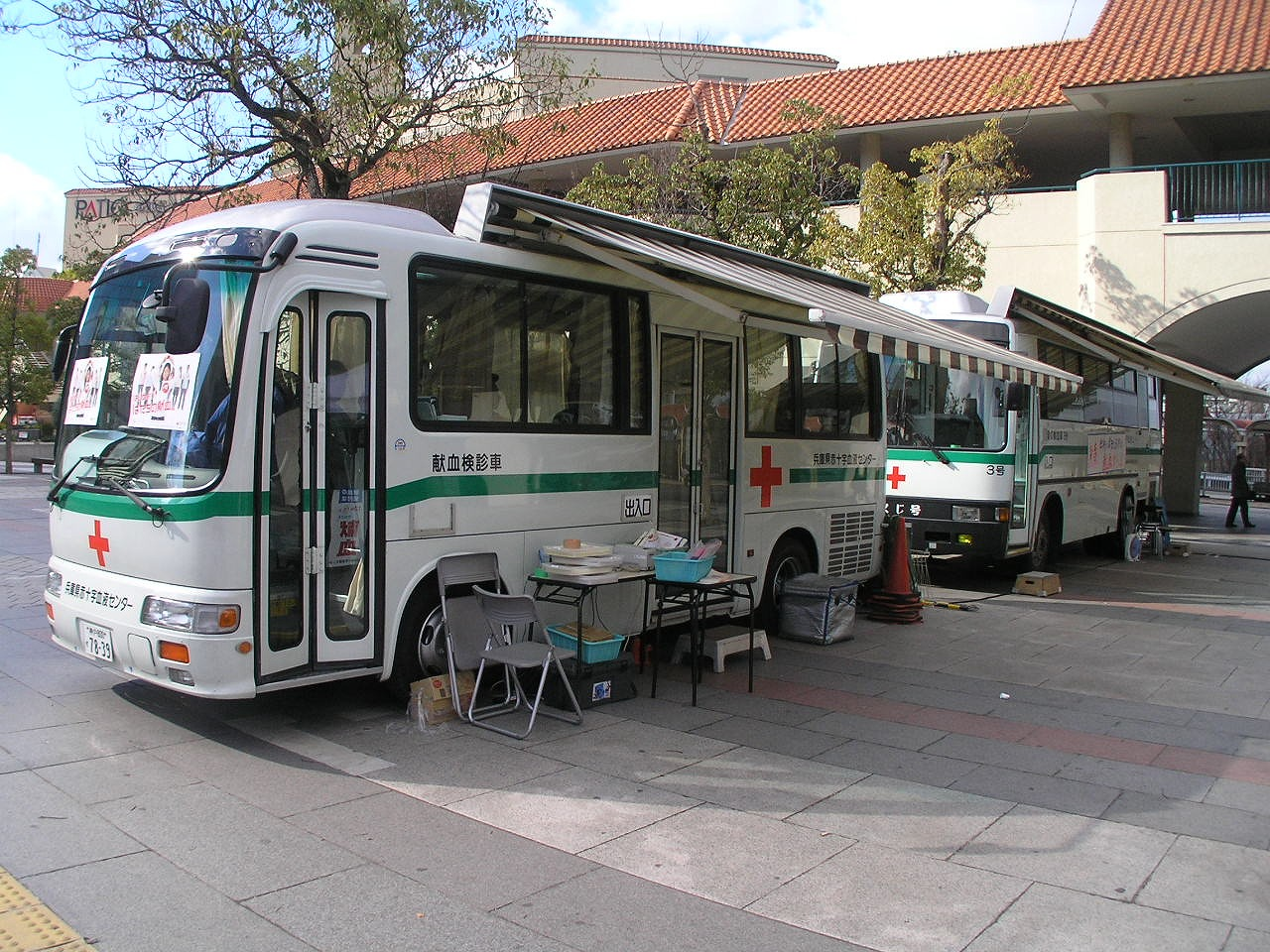
A bloodmobile of Japanese Red Cross at Myōdani Station in Suma-ku, Kobe, Hyōgo Prefecture, Japan.

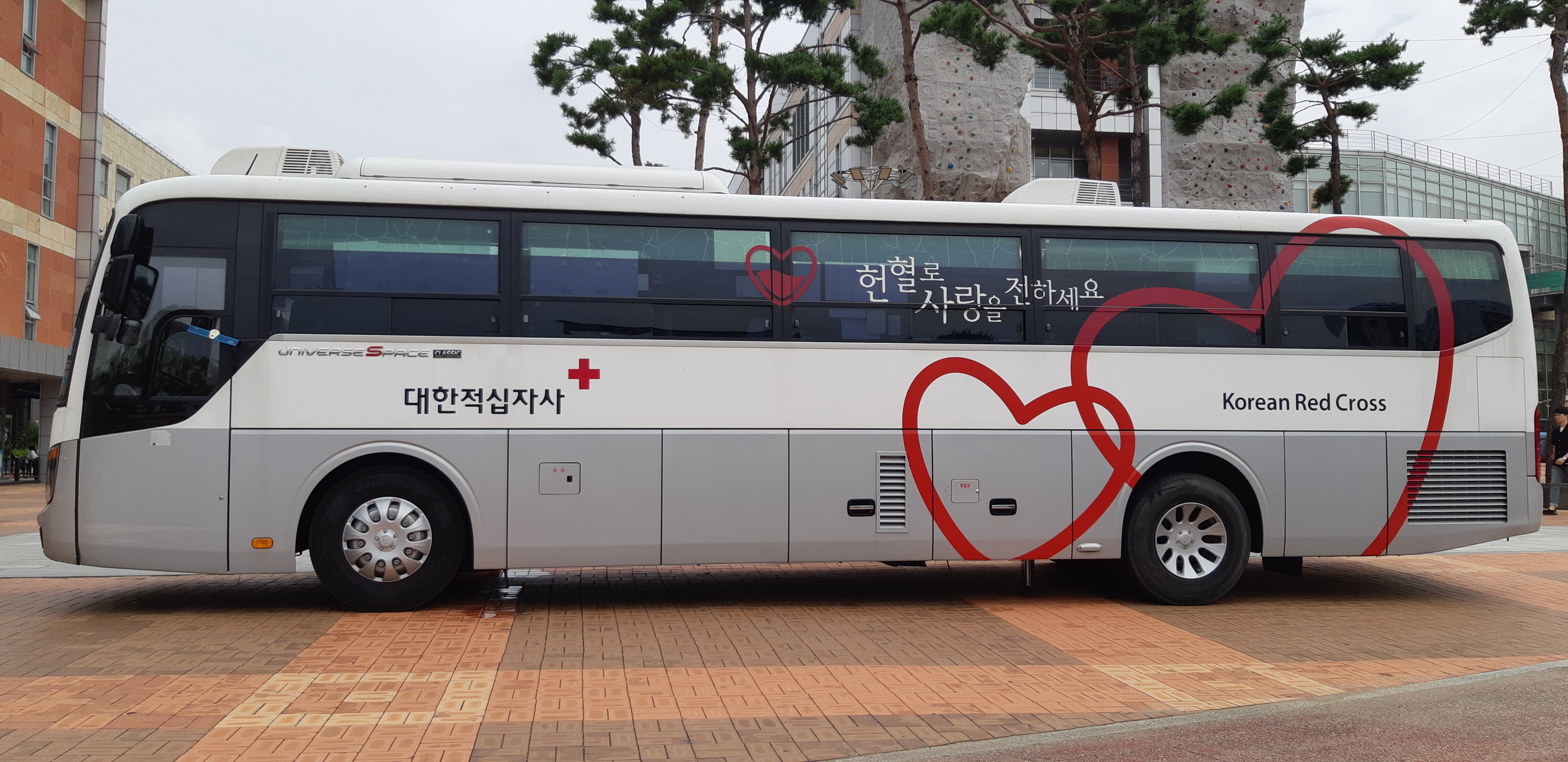
A Hyundai Universe bloodmobile of Korean Red Cross at Incheon National University in Yeonsu-Gu, Incheon, South Korea.

== See also ==
- United Blood Services
- Blood bank
- Phlebotomy
