= NHS Blood and Transplant =

UK public body

- Abbreviation: NHSBT
- Predecessor: National Blood Service; UK Transplant
- Formation: 1 October 2005
- Type: NHS special health authority
- Headquarters: 500 North Bristol Park; Filton; Bristol
- Region served: England and Wales
- Key people: Peter Wyman (Chair); Frances O'Callaghan (Chief Executive) Anthony Clarkson (Director of Organ and Tissue Donation and Transplantation) Gerry Gogarty (Director of Blood Supply)
- Main organ: Board of directors
- Parent organisation: National Health Service
- Website: www.nhsbt.nhs.uk

- Applies to: England (blood donation); United Kingdom (transplants)

Other UK counterparts
- Northern Ireland: Northern Ireland Blood Transfusion Service
- Scotland: Scottish National Blood Transfusion Service
- Wales: Welsh Blood Service

NHS Blood and Transplant is an executive non-departmental public body of the United Kingdom's Department of Health and Social Care. It was established on 1 October 2005 to take over the responsibilities of two separate NHS agencies: UK Transplant (now renamed Organ Donation and Transplantation), founded by Dr. Geoffrey Tovey in 1972, and the National Blood Service (now renamed Blood Donation). Its remit is to provide a reliable, efficient supply of blood, organs and associated services to the NHS. Since NHSBT was established, the organisation has maintained or improved the quality of the services delivered to patients, stabilised the rising cost of blood, and centralised a number of corporate services.

== Overview ==
It has the responsibility for optimising the supply of blood, organs and tissues and raising the quality, effectiveness and efficiency of blood and transplant services. Its roles are stated to include:

- encouraging people to donate organs, blood and tissues
- optimising the safety and supply of blood, organs and tissues (within the NHS)
- helping to raise the quality, effectiveness and clinical outcomes of NHS blood and transplant services
- providing expert advice to other NHS organisations, the Department of Health, Ministers and devolved administrations
- providing appropriate advice and support to health services in other countries
- commissioning and conducting research and development
- actively engaging in implementing relevant EU statutory frameworks and guidance
- being involved in broader international developments

In 2009/10 its strategic objectives were focused on the efficient provision of a safe and sustainable supply of blood and its components, the identification and referral of more organ donors and the establishment of NHSBT as an effective and responsive organisation, focused on the needs of donors and patients. The year saw a record high in organ donation and transplantation together with an increase in the number of people signing up to donate blood.

== Information technology ==
The Core System Modernisation Programme which was meant to modernise the organisation’s information technogy systems was abandoned in 2018 with costs of £26 million written off.

== Operations ==
=== Blood Donation ===
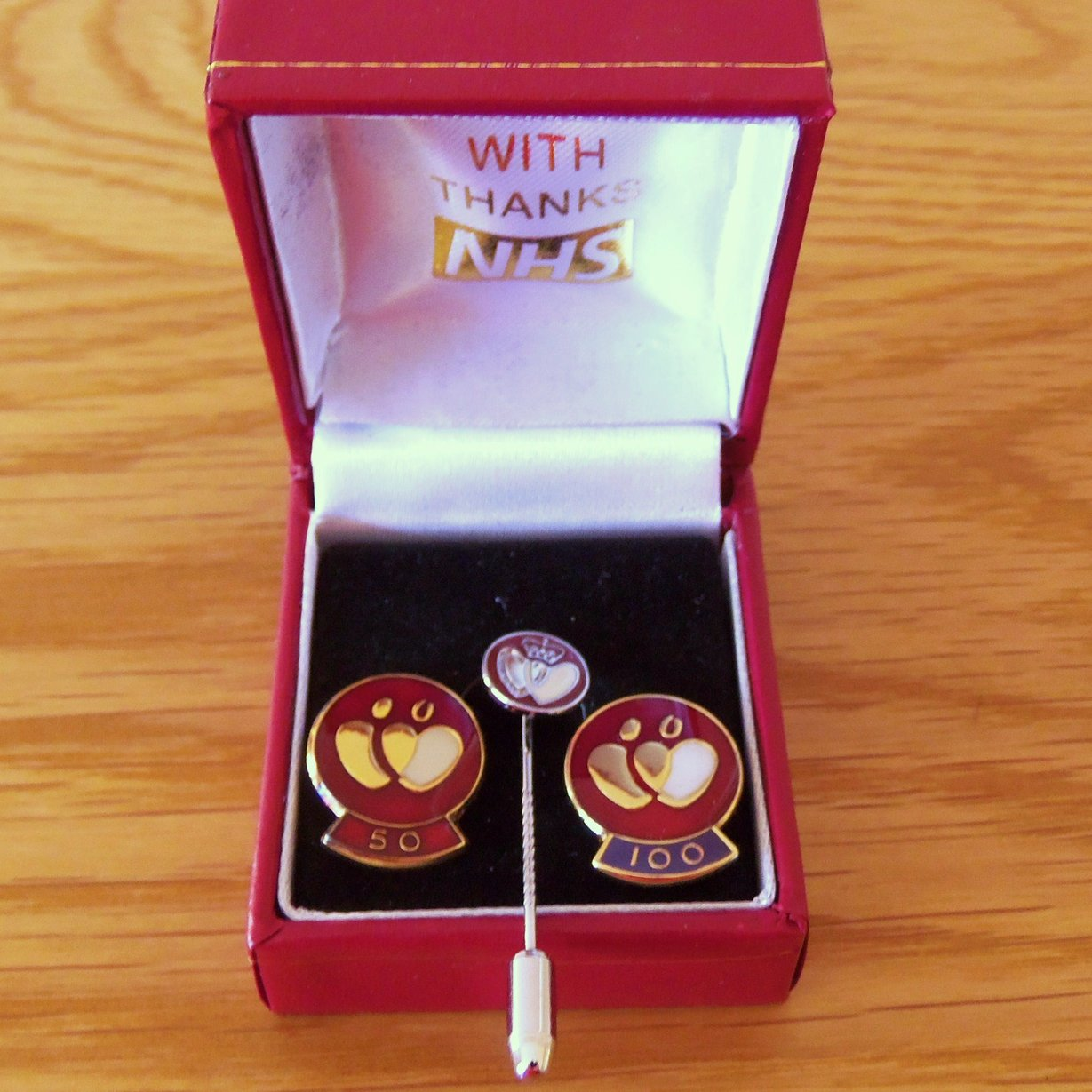
Awards for 50, 25 and 100 donations

The National Blood Service, now renamed NHS Blood Donation, is the organisation for England which collects blood and other tissues, tests, processes, and supplies all the hospitals in England. Other official blood services in the United Kingdom include the Northern Ireland Blood Transfusion Service, Scottish National Blood Transfusion Service and the Welsh Blood Service.

The National Blood Service was formed in 1946 as the National Blood Transfusion Service of England and Wales (NBTS). The National Blood Authority was established as a Special Health Authority in 1993 and assumed control of the 12 English Regional Transfusion Centres in 1994. The National Blood Service became a nationally coordinated body in 1996. The service operates out of fifteen centres, and collects around 2.1 million donations per year and supplies 8,000 units of blood every day. Service directors proposed a reconfiguration and centralisation strategy in 2006, based on the closure of most local processing and testing labs, and subsequent operation out of just three large 'supercentres' to serve the same geographical area. Staff opposed this strategy. In July 2015 it was decided to shut the blood supply chain manufacturing facilities in Sheffield and Newcastle in 2017 and transfer their work to Manchester.

The Battenburg markings used on service vehicles

Blood donation vehicles are allowed the use of blue lights and sirens (known commonly "blues and twos") for the use of emergency blood transports. In some cases this will also require the use of a police escort for the transporting vehicle in order to safely and quickly navigate major road junctions. Escort is normally provided by several motorbike units.

The service depends entirely on voluntary donations from the public. Originally, blood was collected from various donor clinics located over the country. In 1994, the first mobile session was held in Elstree, hosted by The Joely Bear Appeal. In the South West from 1946 and since the formation of the NHS the service was primarily a mobile collection service visiting all parts of the mainly rural community. Originally Local Organisers called up the Donors from their own lists; this only changed in the 1990s. This link with the Local Organisers was inherited from the Wartime Red Cross (mainly) and St. Johns blood collection teams. These mobile teams continue to collect, but two centres – Bristol and Plymouth (Derriford) – have static bases in local venues. Currently, blood donation sessions are set up throughout the country and take place in many diverse venues, from village halls, workplaces and mobile collection units (known as Bloodmobiles). Donors are generally required to be fit and healthy, weigh 50 kilograms (110 lb; 7 st 12 lb) and aged between 17 and 60. However, regular (healthy) donors are permitted to donate past the age of 60 as long as they remain healthy. Donors are encouraged to give blood up to three times a year (once every 16 weeks). Since February 2012, male donors have been allowed to donate up to four times a year. In 2013–14 1,986 people complained they had been turned away from walk-in sessions. 1,949 said they did not have their blood taken even when they had made an appointment.

Besides the main blood donations, known as "whole blood", platelets are also collected. As platelets can only be stored for a few days, regular and frequent donors are in great demand and that is why platelet donors are asked to attend at least 8–10 times per year.

=== Organ Donation and Transplantation ===
Organ Donation and Transplantation ensures that organs donated for transplant are matched and allocated to patients in a fair and unbiased way. Matching, particularly in the case of kidneys, is so important that donation and allocation needs to be organised nationally. The larger the pool of organs, the better the likelihood there is of a good match. Unlike some other NHS organisations, it does not have a direct relationship with patients and do not provide "hands on" care. However, in providing support to transplantation services across England, everything it does affects the quality of service delivered to individual patients.

In 1968, the National Tissue Typing and Reference Laboratory was established at Southmead Hospital in Bristol. The National Organ Matching and Distribution Service was founded in 1972 and the two organisations merged in 1979 to form the UK Transplant Service.

In 1991 the UK Transplant Service became an NHS special health authority and was renamed the United Kingdom Transplant Support Service Authority. It moved to purpose-built accommodation at Stoke Gifford, in the northern suburbs of Bristol, in 1993. In July 2000, UK Transplant was formed with a new, extended remit to increase organ donation rates. In October 2005 UK Transplant merged with the National Blood Service and the Bio Products Laboratory to form NHS Blood and Transplant.

In 2010, the Bio Products Laboratory became a limited company owned directly by the Department of Health. The Department of Health partly privatised it in 2013, selling a significant majority stake to Bain Capital. The business benefited from investment and growth, enabling full privatisation, achieved when a group controlled by Creat Group Corporation acquired it in 2016.

=== NHS Organ Donor Register ===
The NHS Organ Donor Register is a national, confidential list of people who are willing to become donors after their death. It can be quickly accessed to see whether an individual has registered a willingness to be an organ donor.

=== Filton Blood Centre ===
NHSBT operates the largest blood processing facility in Europe, capable of processing 1 million units a year. The site is the head office of NHSBT. It also houses the International Blood Group Reference Laboratory, one of the world’s leading laboratories in rare blood identification.

== See also ==
- Northern Ireland Blood Transfusion Service
- Welsh Blood Service
- Scottish National Blood Transfusion Service
