= Welsh Blood Service =

Blood collecting service in Wales

- Abbreviation: WBS
- Formation: 1997
- Type: Division of Velindre University NHS Trust
- Headquarters: Ely Valley Road; Talbot Green; Pontyclun
- Region served: Wales
- Parent organisation: Velindre University NHS Trust
- Website: www.welsh-blood.org.uk

The Welsh Blood Service is a division of Velindre University NHS Trust responsible for the collection of blood in Wales, and of the distribution of blood products to hospitals within the country, as well as other related functions.

== History ==
The service was established in 1946. At that time the only test carried out was for syphilis. Since then more than 10 million units of blood have been donated in Wales.

== Operations ==
The Welsh Blood Service's roles include

- the collection of voluntary, non-remunerated blood, platelet and stem-cell donations from the general public.
- distribution of blood products to the customer hospitals of Wales.
- provision of an antenatal screening service to hospitals.
- specialist laboratory services, assisting the investigation of complex serological problems.
- the Welsh Transplantation & Immunogenetics Laboratory, providing direct support to local providers of Renal and Stem Cell Transplant Services. It also operates a national panel of unrelated potential blood stem cell donors – the Welsh Bone Marrow Donor Registry.
- Medical Consultant support to Hospital Blood Transfusion Committees, which includes support in achieving the objectives of WHC (2002)137 Better Blood Transfusion. Clinical advice is provided to customer hospitals as required.
- hosting the UK NEQAS external quality assessment scheme for histocompatibility and immunogenetics and the Welsh Assessment of Serological Proficiency scheme (WASPS), contribution to the maintenance of quality standards in the transfusion and transplantation community.

=== All-Wales Blood Service ===
On 2 May 2016 the Welsh Blood Service became a national service and began collecting and distributing blood in North Wales. Previously to this, the service covered Mid, South and West Wales, with NHS Blood and Transplant, covering North Wales.

=== Research and development ===
The research and development activity within the Welsh Blood Service supports a broad range of healthcare topics. Its four research themes, Transplantation, Donor Care and Public Health, Products and Therapies reflect the spectrum of this work. In 2017 the Welsh Blood Service published its Research and Development Strategy, which details its planned expansion of activity into collaborative work and engaging in regenerative and personalised medicine fields.

== See also ==
- NHS Blood and Transplant
- Scottish National Blood Transfusion Service
- Northern Ireland Blood Transfusion Service
