= Northern Ireland Blood Transfusion Service =

The Northern Ireland Blood Transfusion Service (NIBTS) is an independent, special agency of the Department of Health in Northern Ireland, responsible for the collection testing and issuing of blood and blood products to hospitals throughout Northern Ireland. An emergency Blood Transfusion Service was established at the Royal Victoria Hospital in 1941 as a result of the Second World War. NIBTS was established by the Ministry of Health in 1946.

== See also ==
- NHS Blood and Transplant
- Welsh Blood Service
- Scottish National Blood Transfusion Service
- Irish Blood Transfusion Service
