= Scottish National Blood Transfusion Service =

Government agency in Edinburgh, Scotland

- Abbreviation: SNBTS
- Type: Strategic Business Unit of Public Services Delivery Scotland
- Headquarters: The Jack Copland Centre, 52 Research Avenue North, Heriot-Watt Research Park
- Region served: Scotland
- Parent organisation: Public Services Delivery Scotland, NHS Scotland
- Website: www.scotblood.co.uk

The Scottish National Blood Transfusion Service (SNBTS) is the national blood, blood product and tissue provider. It makes up a Strategic Business Unit of NHS National Services Scotland (NSS).

== History ==
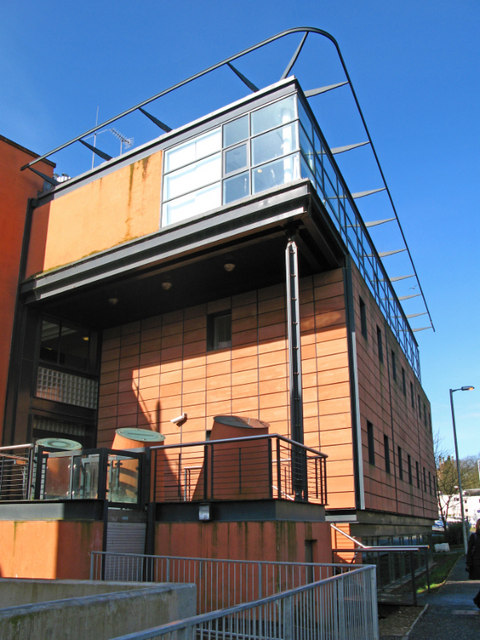
SNBTS, Gartnavel Hospital

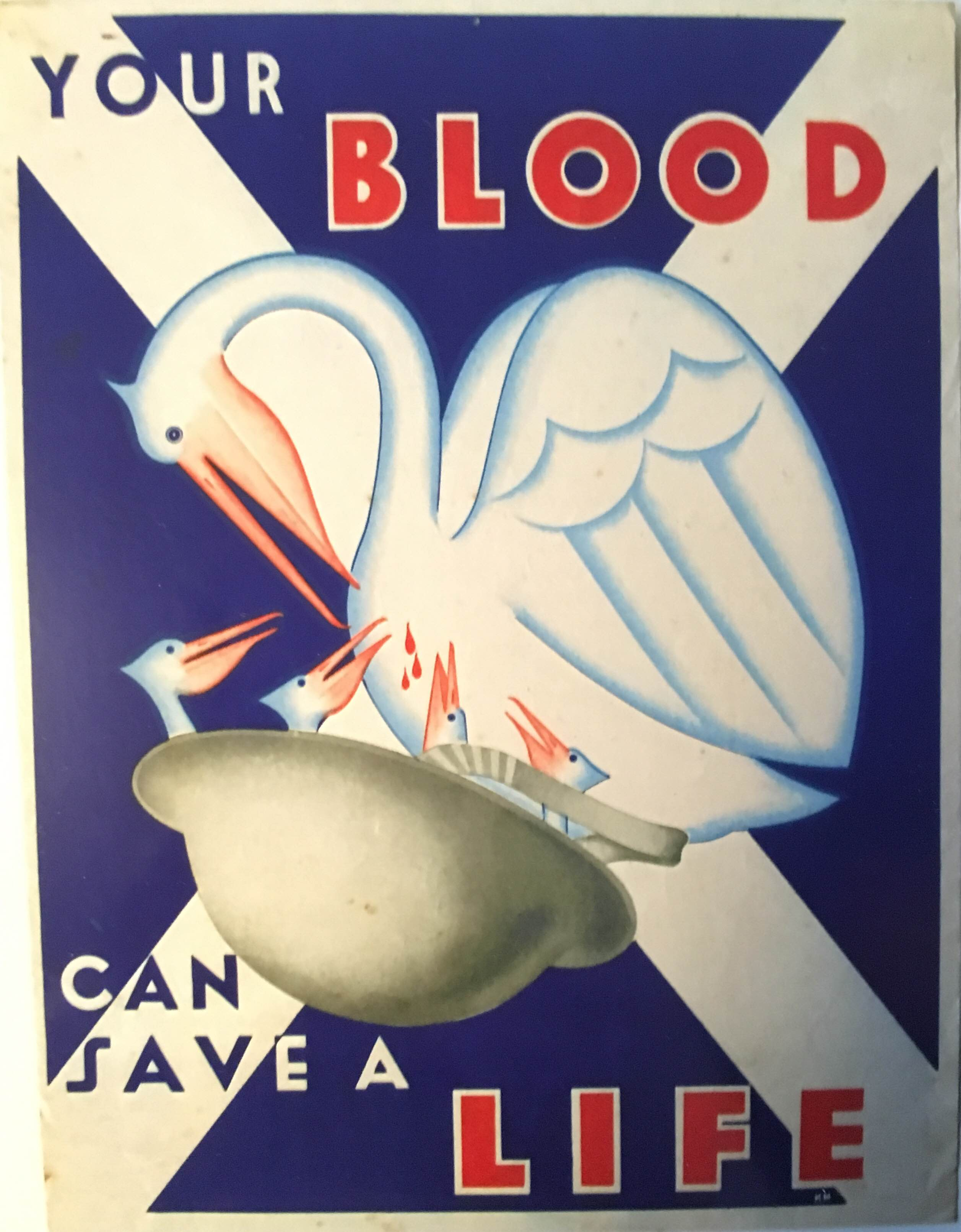
1944 SNBTA Recruitment Poster by K. M. Munnich

The first dedicated transfusion service in Scotland was formed at the Royal Infirmary of Edinburgh in the 1930s. The Edinburgh Blood Transfusion Service (EBTS) was established in 1936 with Jack Copland as Organiser and Helen White as Secretary. Helen White took over as Organiser in 1940 when Copland moved into a national role. The first meeting of the Scottish National Blood Transfusion Association (SNBTA) took place in Edinburgh in February 1940.

== Key personnel ==
In the 1940s Helen White played a key role in the development of the blood donor service in Edinburgh and throughout Scotland, on her initiative a network of voluntary organisers was established. The network was characterised by its friendliness and the care she took in making voluntary donation an enjoyable activity.

== Centres ==
There are five blood centres, in Aberdeen, Dundee, Edinburgh, Glasgow and Inverness.

The SNBTS also has several mobile units that travel to the remote centres and communities. These are usually set up in village halls and community centres. They tend to return approximately every 13 weeks, which can allow for up to four donations each year.

In November 2011 it was announced that a new national centre would be built within the Heriot-Watt research park in Edinburgh, and would include labs, offices and other facilities. By October 2014, construction work had begun on the new £43 million facility. The new centre is due to be completed in 2017 and has been funded using the Scottish Government's Non Profit Distributing (NPD) model.

== See also ==
- NHS Blood and Transplant – the equivalent organisation in England
- Northern Ireland Blood Transfusion Service
- Welsh Blood Service
- Blood donation
- Blood transfusion
- James Blundell (physician)
- Emergency Hospital Service
- NHS Scotland
- Scottish Centre for Regenerative Medicine
