= Mythe Water Treatment Works =

Water purification works in Gloucestershire, England

Coordinates: 52°0′0″N 2°9′45″W

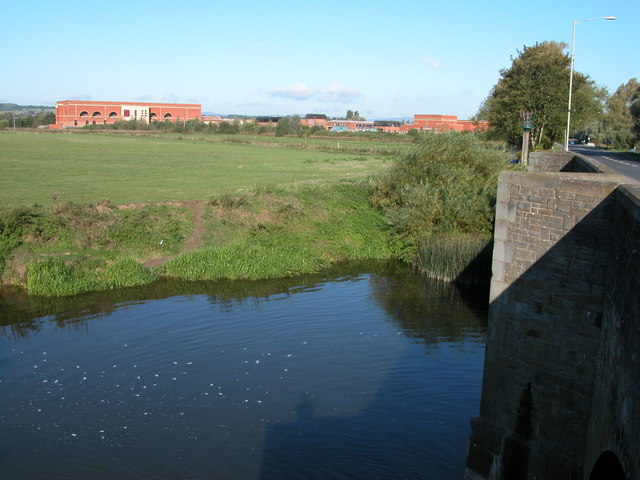
The Mythe Waterworks viewed from the Beaufort Bridge, carrying the A38 over the Old Avon

The Mythe Water Treatment Works in Tewkesbury, Gloucestershire, England, is a water purification facility that treats water drawn from the River Severn for public consumption.

== Overview ==
On 1 March 2002, Severn Trent Water worked with local councillors to create an emergency plan that was supposed to ensure that in a state of emergency their services would not be affected.

It came to national attention in July 2007 when it became inundated with water from the River Severn during the Summer 2007 United Kingdom floods. The water coming into the plant was contaminated, and this led to the loss of tap water for approximately 150,000 people in Cheltenham, Gloucester and Tewkesbury.

Following the flooding, a variety of measures have been taken, including a 3.5 metres (11 ft) high wall, to reduce the likelihood of recurrence.

== See also ==
- Rangil water treatment plant
- Maradu Water Treatment Plant
