= 2007 United Kingdom floods =

Fatal series of natural disasters

2007 UK floods
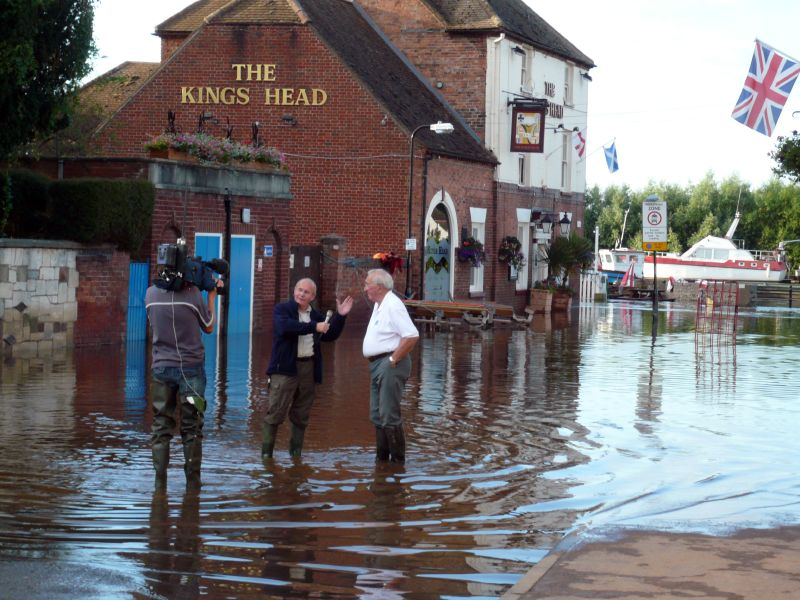
- ITN interview at a flood of the River Severn, 2007

Meteorological history
- Duration: 1 June 2007 – 28 July 2007

Overall effects
- Fatalities: 13
- Damage: about £6.5 billion
- Areas affected: (see below)

A series of large floods occurred in parts of the United Kingdom during the summer of 2007. The worst of the flooding occurred across parts of Northern Ireland and Scotland on 14 June; East Yorkshire and the Midlands on 15 June; Yorkshire, the Midlands, Gloucestershire, Herefordshire and Worcestershire on 25 June; and Gloucestershire, Herefordshire, Worcestershire, Oxfordshire, Berkshire and South Wales on 28 July 2007.

June was one of the wettest months on record in the United Kingdom (see List of weather records). Average rainfall across the country was 5.5 inches (140 mm); more than double the June average. Some areas received a month's worth of precipitation in 24 hours. It was the UK's wettest May–July period since records began in 1776. July had unusually unsettled weather and above-average rainfall through the month, peaking on 20 July as an active frontal system dumped more than 4.7 inches (120 mm) of rain in southern England.

Civil and military authorities described the June and July rescue efforts as the biggest in the UK in peacetime. The Environment Agency described the July floods as critical and expected them to exceed the 1947 benchmark.

== Meteorological background ==
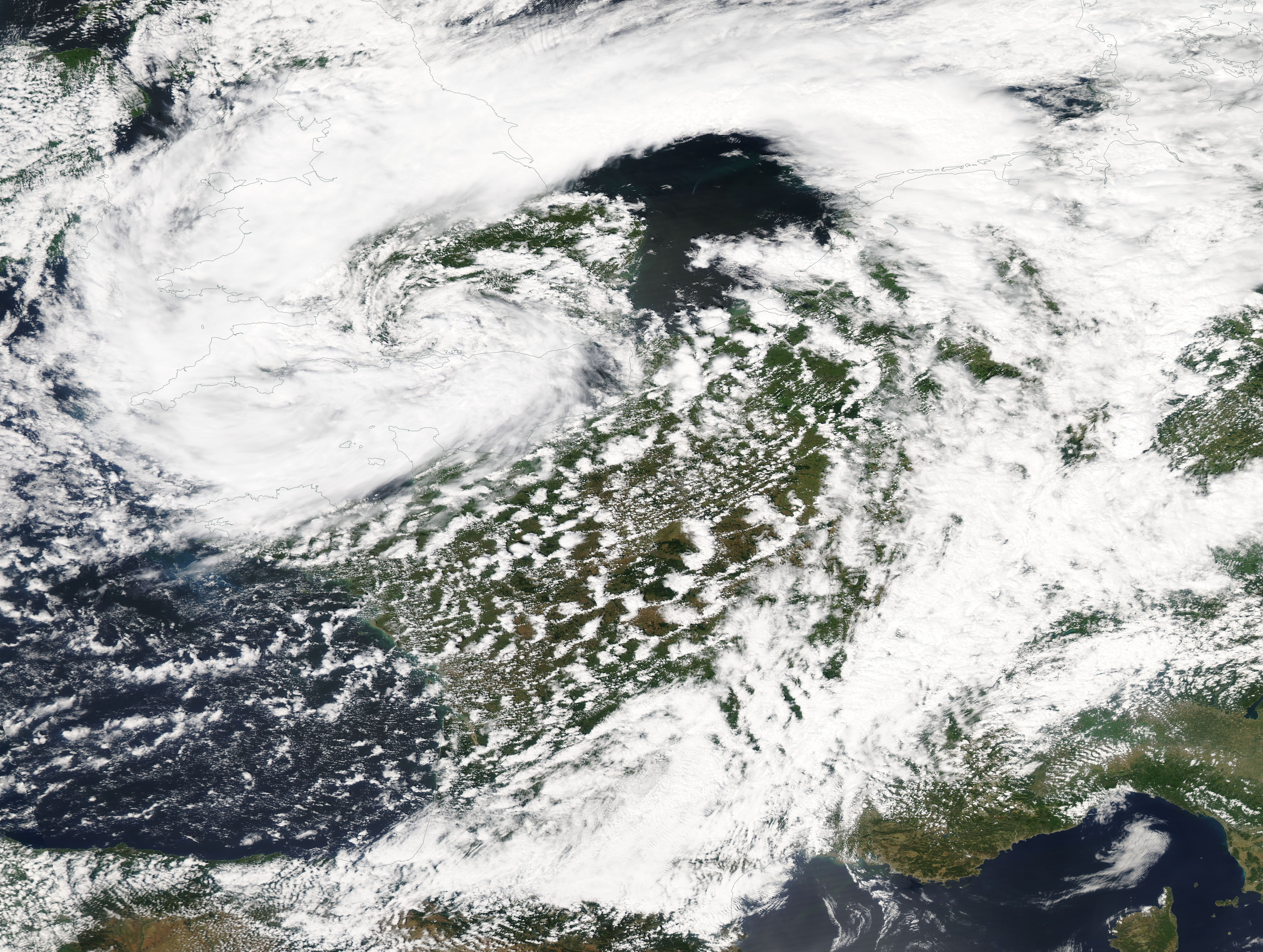
Cyclone Uriah crossing the United Kingdom on 25 June. Associated heavy rainfall led to flooding across northern England, particularly in Sheffield.

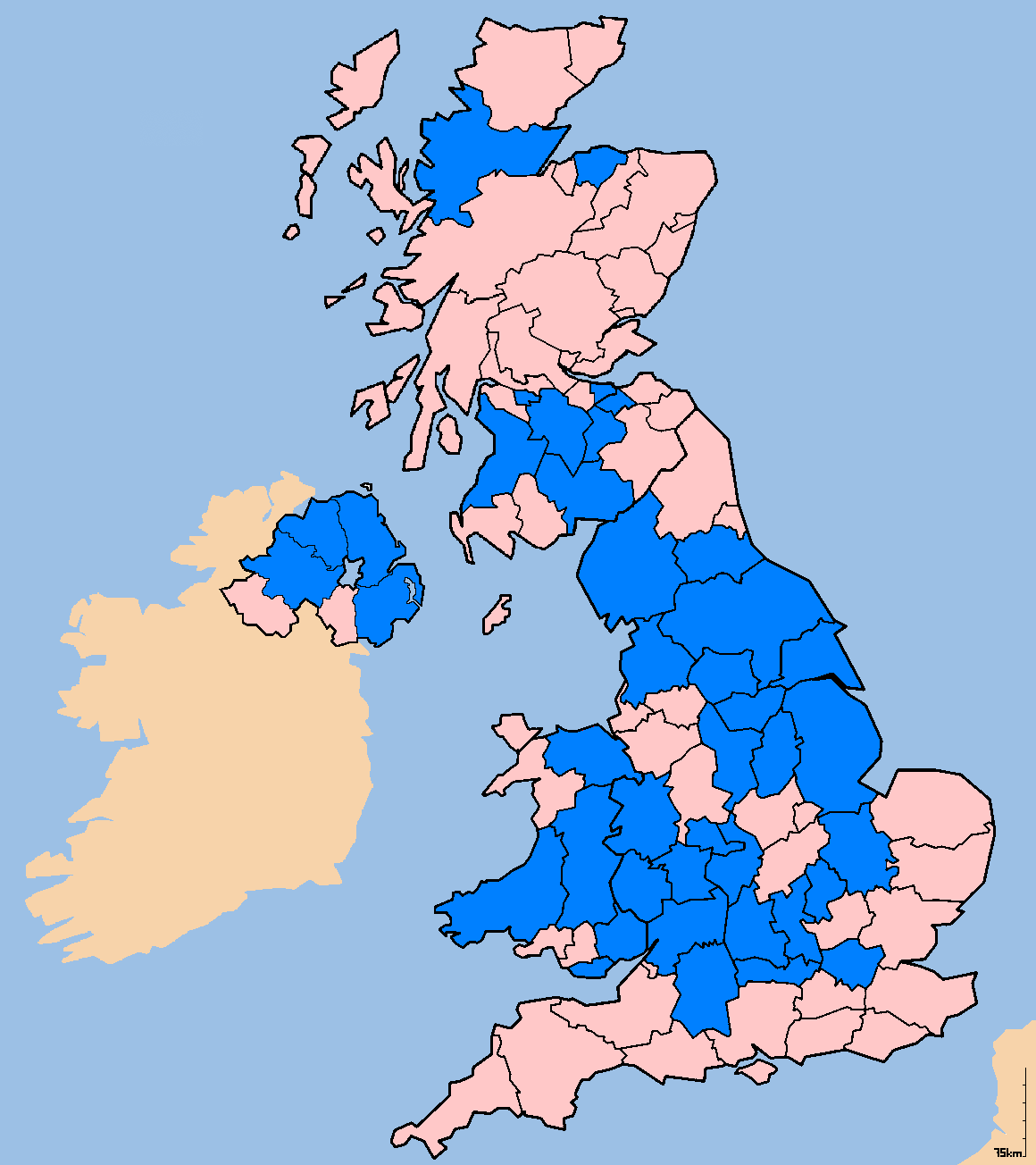
Non-administrative areas affected in June and July 2007 floods as of 24 July (marked in blue)

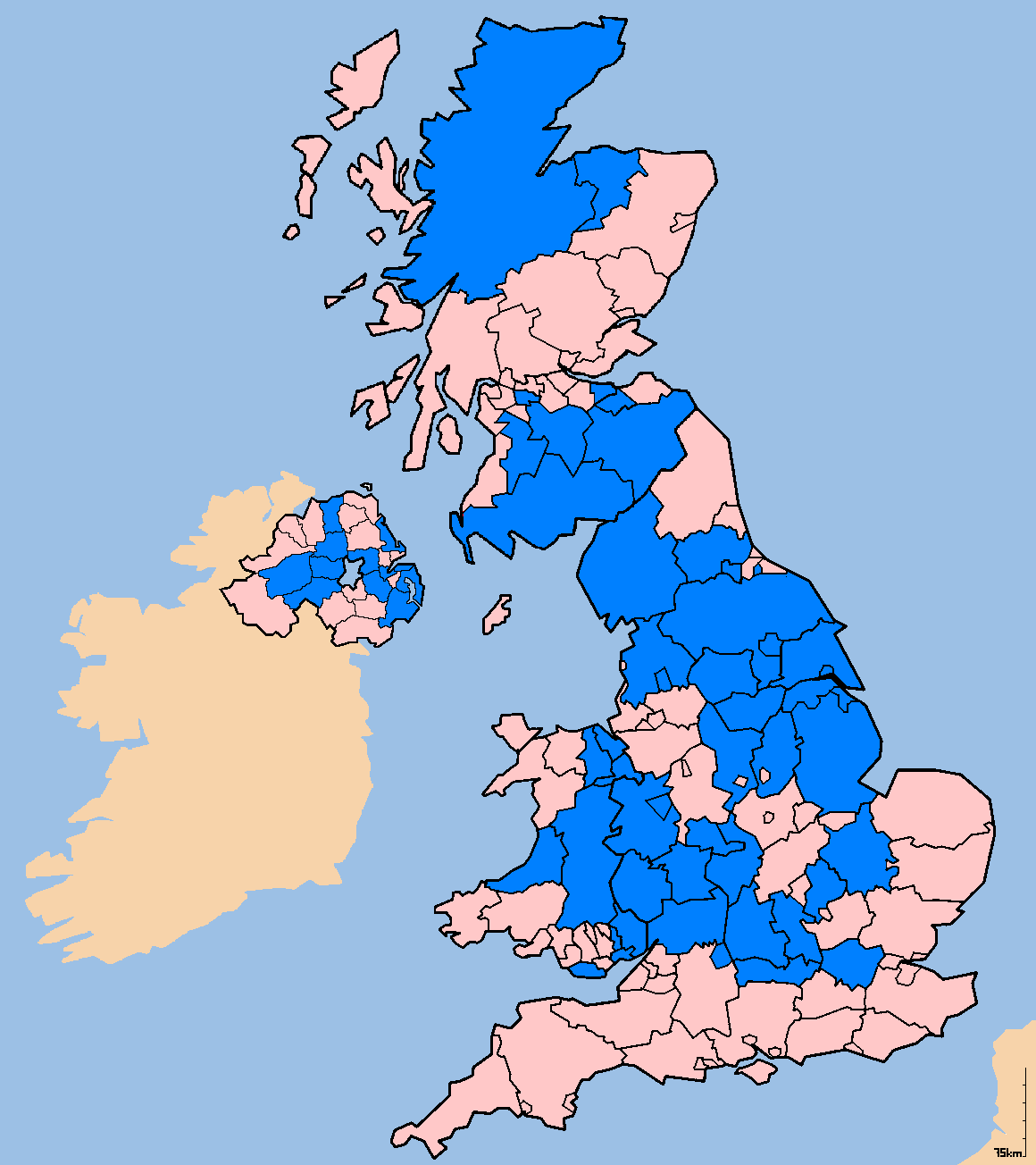
Administrative areas affected in June and July 2007 floods as of 24 July (marked in blue)

June 2007 started quietly with an anticyclone to the north of the United Kingdom maintaining a dry, cool easterly flow. From 10 June the high pressure began to break down as an upper trough moved into the area, triggering thunderstorms that caused flooding in Northern Ireland on 12 June.

Later that week, a slow-moving area of low pressure from the west of Biscay moved east across the British Isles. At the same time an associated occluded front moved into northern England, becoming very active as it did so, with the peak rainfall on 15 June. Rainfall records were broken across the region, leading to localised flooding. As it weakened, the front moved north into Scotland on 16 June and left England and Wales with a very unstable airmass, frequent heavy showers, thunderstorms and cloudy conditions. This led to localised flash flooding and prevented significant drying where earlier rains had fallen.

On 25 June, another unseasonably low pressure (993 hPa / 29.3 inHg) depression, Cyclone Uriah, moved across England. The associated front settled over northern and eastern England and dumped more than 3.9 inches (100 mm) of rain in places. The combination of high rainfall and high water levels from the earlier rainfall led to extensive flooding across many parts of England and Wales, with the Midlands, Gloucestershire, Worcestershire, South, West and East Yorkshire the most affected. Gales along the east coast also caused storm damage. RAF Fylingdales on the North York Moors reported rainfall totals of 4.1 inches (103 mm) in 24 hours, an estimated 3.9 inches (100 mm) in Hull and 3.0 inches (77 mm) on Emley Moor in West Yorkshire. Until 2007, the average monthly total for June for the whole UK was 2.86 inches (72.6 mm).

On 27 June, the Met Office released an early warning of severe weather for the approaching weekend, stating that 0.79 to 1.97 inches (20 to 50 mm) of rain could fall in some areas, raising the possibility of more flooding within the already saturated flood plains.

On 20 July, another active frontal system moved across southern England. Many places recorded a month's rainfall or more in one day. The Met Office at RAF Brize Norton in Oxfordshire reported 4.98 inches (126.6 mm): a sixth of its annual rainfall. The college at Pershore in Worcestershire reported 5.60 inches (142.2 mm), causing the Environment Agency to issue 16 further severe flood warnings. By 21 July, many towns and villages were flooded, with Gloucestershire, Worcestershire, Warwickshire, Wiltshire, Oxfordshire, Berkshire, London and South Wales facing the brunt of the heavy rainfall.

Climate researchers suggested that the unusual weather leading to the floods might be linked to that year's appearance of La Nina in the Pacific Ocean, and to the jet stream being further south than normal.

== Affected areas in England ==
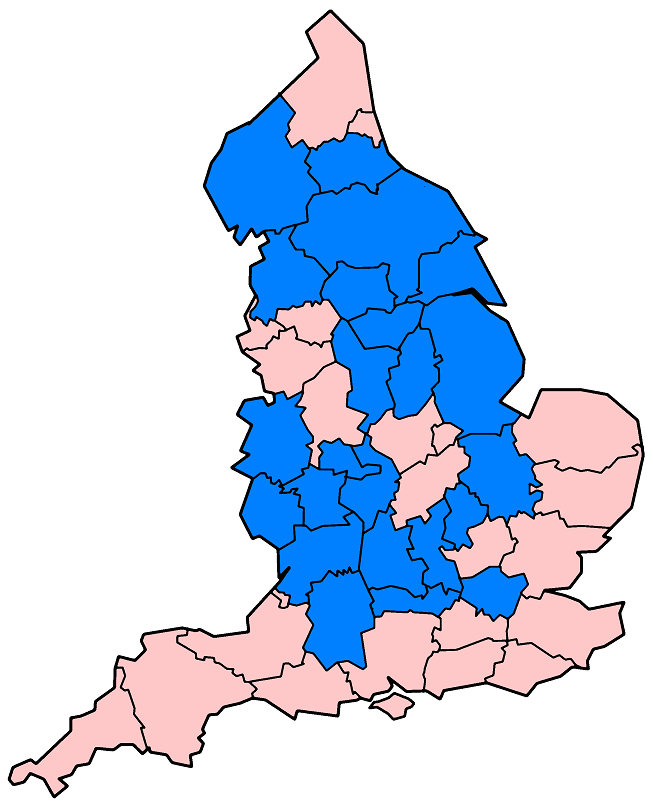
Non-administrative counties in England affected in June and July 2007 floods as of 24 July (marked in blue)

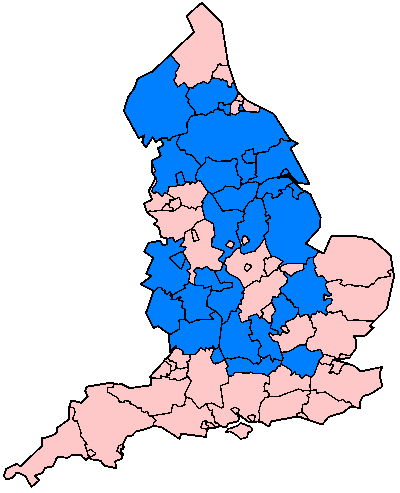
Administrative counties in England affected in June and July 2007 floods as of 24 July (marked in blue)

England was affected by the June and July floods, with the North badly hit in June, the West badly hit in July, and many areas hit in both. It was England's wettest July on record. Gloucestershire was the worst affected county – with both some minor flooding in June, and major flooding in July. Non-administrative counties and administrative counties affected by the flooding are given below.

=== Bedfordshire ===
By 25 July, a number of low-lying parts adjacent to the river in Bedford and Luton were flooded and one man drowned attempting to swim across the River Great Ouse in Bedford. Parts of Felmersham and Turvey were also flooded.

=== Berkshire ===
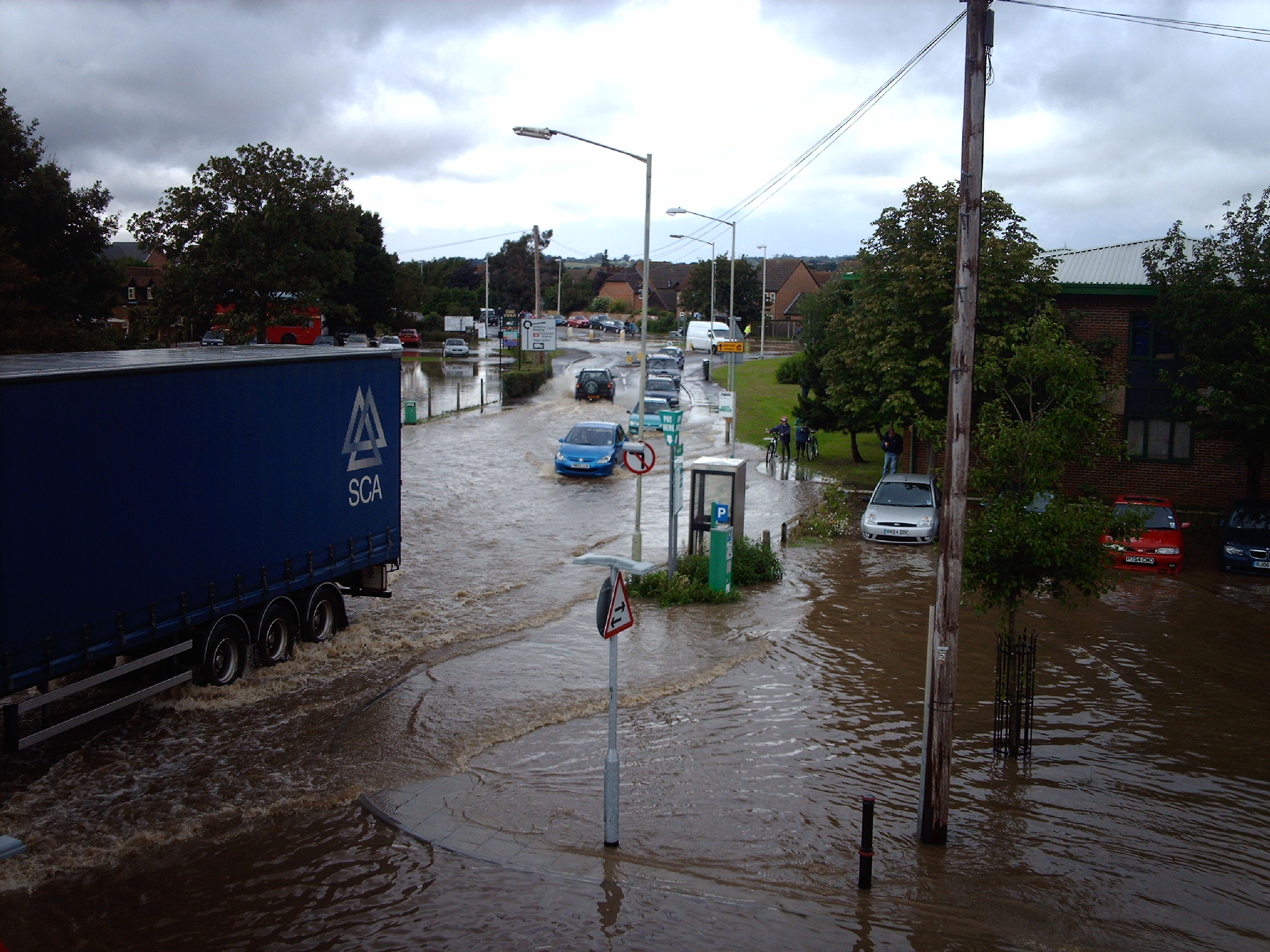
Flooding outside Thatcham railway station on 20 July

On 20 July, the M4 was closed after a landslide caused by flooding between Junctions 12 and 13 eastbound. Approximately 1,100 properties in Thatcham were affected by flash flooding.

By 21 July, Newbury and Maidenhead town centres were flooded, the shopping mall in Maidenhead was closed and parts of the Glade Festival were flooded. Officials warned that the River Thames, the River Ock, and its tributaries from Charney could burst their banks.

In Reading, rail services to the southwest were affected, and westbound trains from Paddington could go no further.

The flood waters affected the Atomic Weapons Establishment at Burghfield, which handles the United Kingdom's nuclear warheads, resulting in a suspension of work for almost a year.

=== Buckinghamshire ===
On 3 June, Stoke Goldington suffered flash flooding affecting 25 homes. Stoke Goldington was affected again on 3 July, with 10 houses being flooded. By 21 July, seventy homes and businesses were flooded by the River Ouse in Buckingham and 30 people spent the night in the town's Radcliffe centre, but 10 miles (16 km) away a system of balancing lakes prevented Milton Keynes from suffering significantly, apart from a flash flood of Stony Stratford High Street from the River Ouse.

=== Cambridgeshire ===
On 24 July, four bridges in St Neots were shut when the river level peaked, and the Environment Agency warned residents in the St Neots, Paxton and Offords areas to expect flooding that night. By 25 July, parts of St Ives were flooded. Later the same day, the Environment Agency advised residents near the River Great Ouse that the peak had passed and further flooding was unlikely.

=== County Durham ===
On 15 June, heavy rainfall caused the postponement of the fourth test match between England and the West Indies at the Riverside Ground, Chester-le-Street. On 23 June, flash floods affected parts of Darlington and Stanhope Road, Northgate, St Cuthbert's Way, Parkgate and Haughton Road were closed after water levels rose by about 2 feet (0.6 m). It has also led to Woodland Road to improve its drainage to prevent such flooding on one of the main roads out the town. On 17 July, flooding affected Peterlee town centre, closing shops and a local school.

=== Cumbria ===
A 64-year-old man hit his head and died after trying to bail out his flooded home in Alston, Cumbria.

=== Derbyshire ===
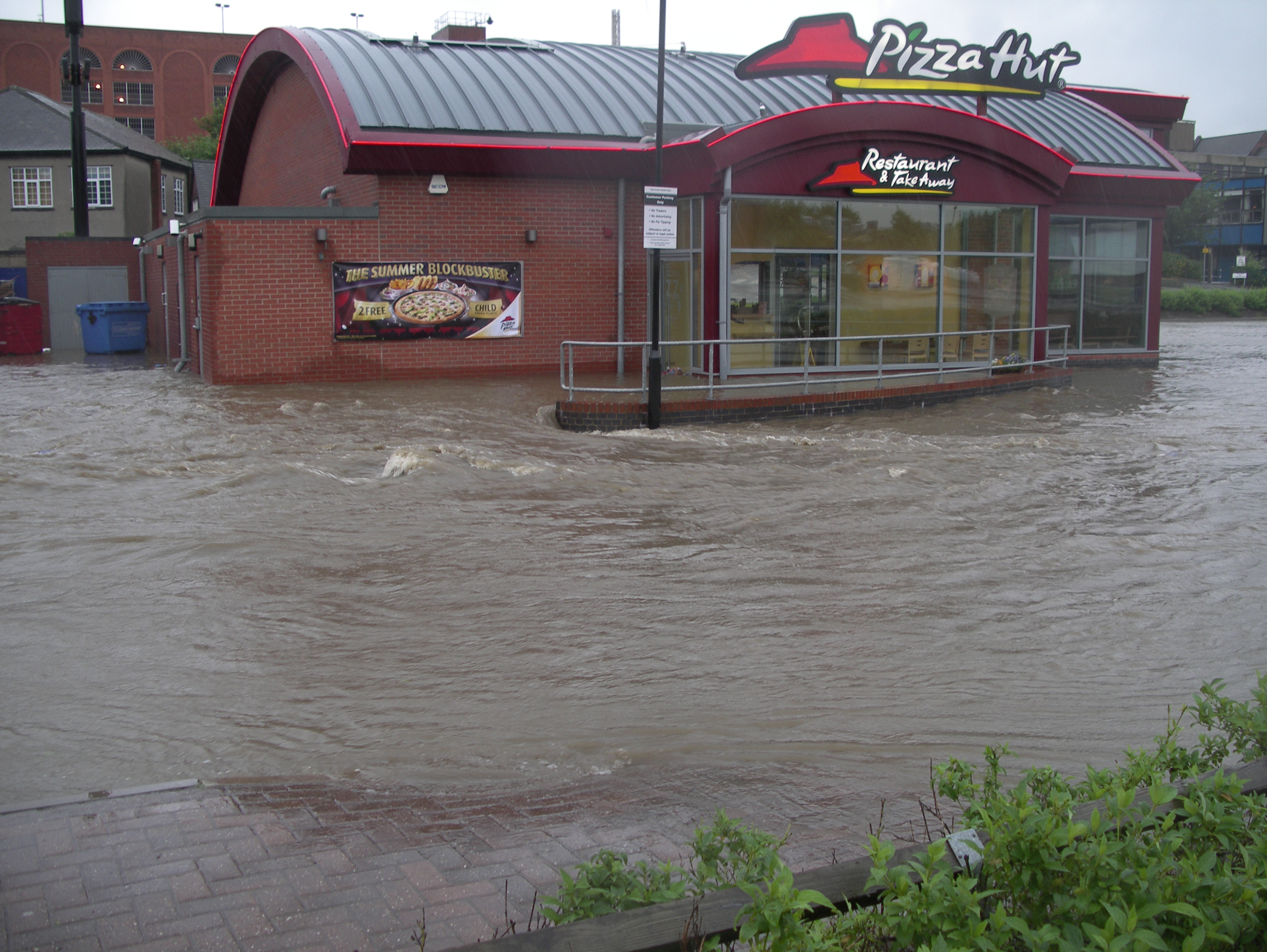
A flooded Pizza Hut in Chesterfield

On 25 June, flooding affected properties in Coal Aston, Calow and Chesterfield town centre, and the A617 was covered by more than 2 feet (0.6 m) of floodwater causing traffic delays.

=== Gloucestershire ===
Severe flooding in Tewkesbury

On 19 July, Gloucestershire Fire and Rescue Service attended 1,800 calls in a 48-hour period, compared with the usual 8,000 calls a year.

On 22 July, Gloucester City A.F.C.'s Stadium was flooded, and the Tewkesbury road at Longford was completely impassable by the Longford Inn. Tewkesbury was completely cut off with no road access, parts of the town were under around 3 feet (0.9 m) of water and flood waters entered Tewkesbury Abbey for the first time in 247 years. Tewkesbury's Mythe Water Treatment Works were flooded. Severn Trent Water warned that treated water would run out by early Sunday evening in Tewkesbury, Cheltenham, Gloucester and surrounding areas.

Combined military and civil emergency services tried to prevent floods reaching the Walham electricity substation in Gloucester supplying half a million people. On 23 July, 50,000 Gloucestershire homes were left without electricity after a major electricity substation in Castle Meads had to be turned off. Efforts to stop flooding at Walham substation succeeded; the Castle Meads substation was repaired the next day.

By 24 July, an estimated 420,000 people were without running water, including most of the population of Gloucester, Cheltenham, and Tewkesbury. Emergency services continued repair work at the Mythe water-treatment works, but Severn Trent Water estimated that water supplies would not be restored for at least 14 days. 900 drinking water bowsers were brought in, and the Army was mobilised to distribute three million bottles of water a day and keep the bowsers filled. Coors, Carlsberg, Scottish and Newcastle, Inbev and Greene King brewing companies offered 23 beer tankers to help supply drinking water. On 26 July, Severn Trent Water organised a temporary non-potable water supply to 10,000 homes in Tewkesbury. It was not until 7 August – 16 days after Mythe Treatment Works stopped pumping – that the tap water for the 140,000 homes affected was again declared safe to drink.

A man and his 24-year-old son died from asphyxiation from carbon monoxide poisoning on 27 July when attempting to stop flooding in the unventilated Tewkesbury Rugby Football Club cellar. On 28 July, the body of a 19-year-old man, reported missing seven days earlier, was recovered in Tewkesbury.

=== Greater London ===
On 20 July, flooding occurred in many parts of Greater London. Water and power supplies were not disrupted but parts of South West London were under 2 feet (61 cm) of water. Heathrow Airport cancelled 141 flights. Two of four rail lines in South Croydon were closed by landslips. The London Underground was severely disrupted and 25 stations were closed.

=== Herefordshire ===
By 19 June, Herefordshire was affected by flooding. The M50 motorway near Ledbury was closed on 22 July due to flooding. More than 5,200 people in and around Bromyard were without clean water on 22 and 23 July after the pumps at the Whitbourne works failed. Once supply was restored residents were urged by Welsh Water to boil their tap-water until further notice. The village of Hampton Bishop, 3 miles (5 km) from the city of Hereford, was surrounded and flooded by water after the River Lugg burst its banks. On the afternoon of 24 July the Fire Service began pumping flood water out of the village, but not before 130 residents were evacuated. Some houses, including the Herefordshire home of Daily Mail writer Quentin Letts, were flooded by a torrent of water gushing from what had previously been only a small, unnamed brook north of Ross-on-Wye.

Residents of East Bromyard were rescued after the River Frome burst its banks.

=== Lancashire ===
On 12 June, Lostock Hall and Penwortham near Preston were hit by flash floods. On 3 July, heavy rain caused flooding in Earby and Ribchester, affecting homes and causing the Royal Lancashire Show to be cancelled on 9 July. On 4 July, the Blackburn Mela was cancelled due to ground conditions. On 18 July, Walton-le-Dale near Preston was hit by flash floods.

=== Lincolnshire ===
Louth and Horncastle were severely flooded, some roads in that area becoming impassable. Children at a school in Horncastle were evacuated because of floods. More than 600-flood related calls occurred across the county. In Lincoln, mainly round the Stamp End area, a house called Shuttleworth House was completely flooded with water in its insides. After power was lost in the area, more than 200 people were rescued in dinghies.

=== Nottinghamshire ===
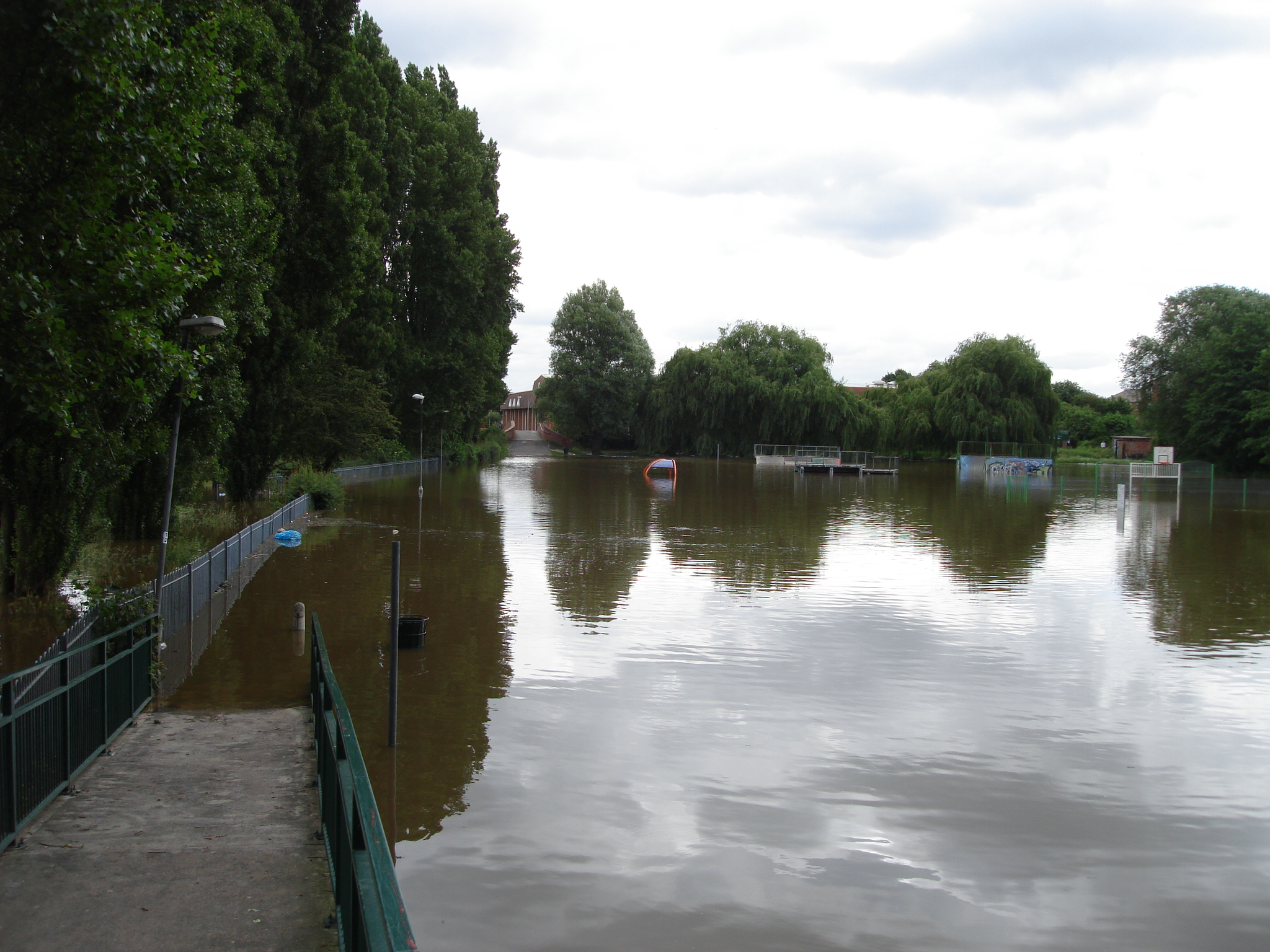
Flooding in King's Park, in Retford as a result of the River Idle overtopping its banks, taken on 27 June

On 27 June 2007, flash flooding caused extensive damage to the villages of Lambley, Woodborough and Burton Joyce. Major towns were hit including Mansfield and Hucknall but not as severely as Lambley. The same day, flooding occurred at Retford and Worksop after the River Idle and River Ryton respectively overtopped their banks.

=== Oxfordshire ===
Many rivers burst their banks, including both the Thames and the Cherwell in Oxford and the Ock in Abingdon the Windrush in Witney and the Evenlode.

By 21 July, Banbury and Witney were flooded. Oxford, particularly Botley, was flooded and some 300 people were evacuated.

On 22 July, the Environment Agency warned of further flooding and 1,500 people in Abingdon were evacuated. Forty thousand sandbags were transported from Grantham in Lincolnshire to Abingdon and Oxford.

By 23 July, Oxford, Abingdon, Kidlington and Bladon were affected; some 3,000 homes including the home of William Morris at Kelmscott were flooded and 600 residents were evacuated, with many taking refuge in Oxford United Football Club's Kassam Stadium.

On 24 July, the Thames in Abingdon rose 3 feet (0.9 m) in less than 12 hours to a "perilously high" level and the Thames and the Severn were expected to rise to 20 feet (6.1 m) higher than normal.

On 25 July, residents of Osney in west Oxford were advised to leave their homes. About 30 people went to the Kassam stadium shelter while another 250 decided to stay with family and friends. Osney Mead substation, which supplies power to Oxford city centre, was threatened but did not flood. Later that evening the Thames breached its banks at Henley.

=== Shropshire ===
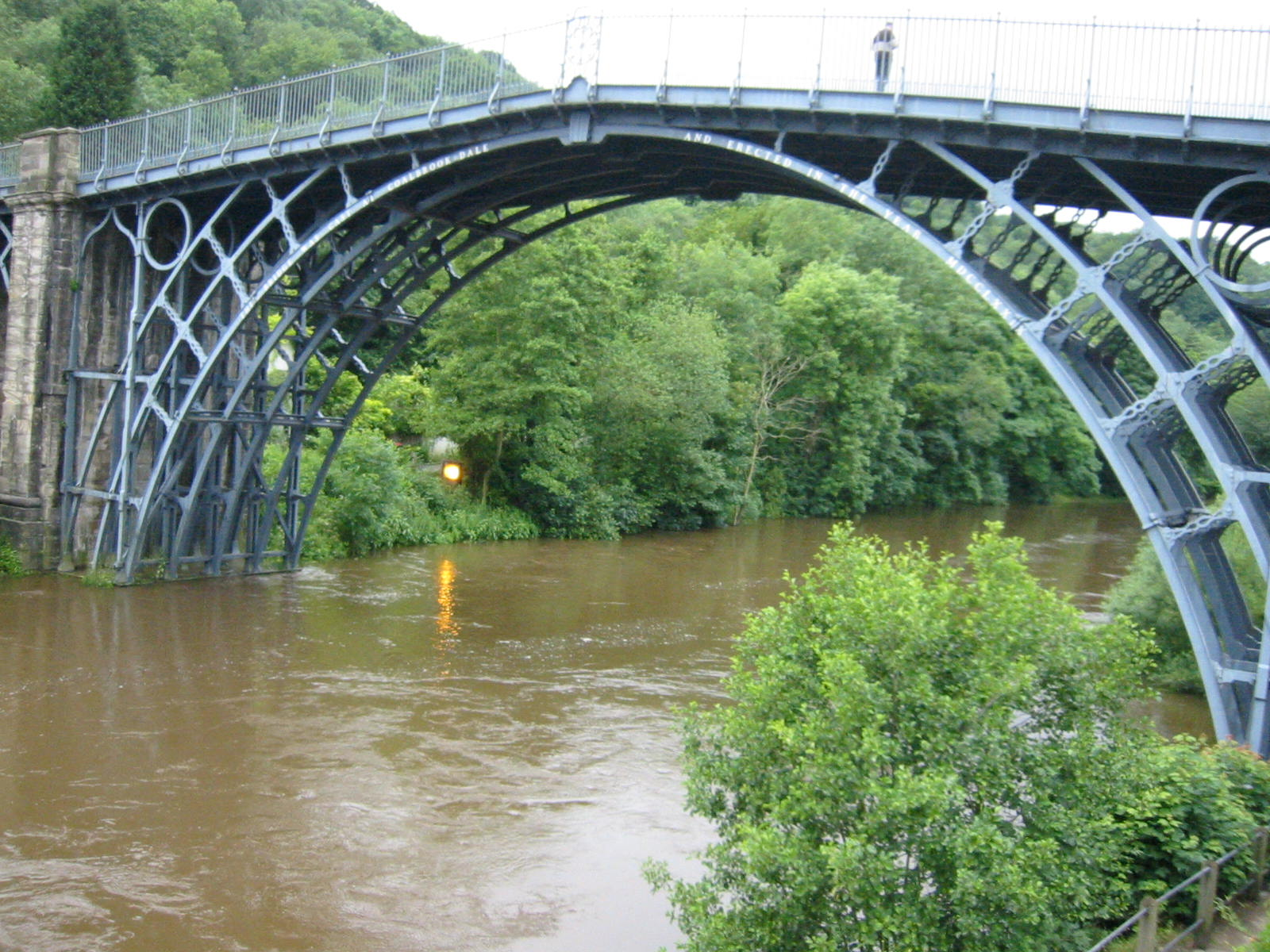
Rising River Severn at Ironbridge, Shropshire, 28 June

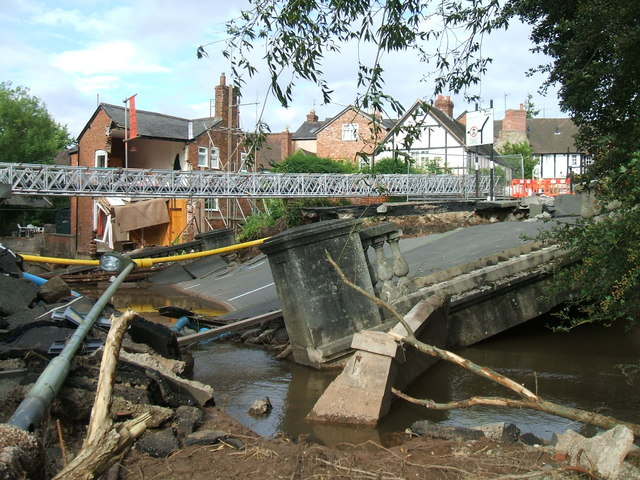
Bridge collapse in Ludlow, 26 June

By 19 June, rain had washed away the main road at Hampton Loade and the Severn Valley Railway line from Bridgnorth was closed after numerous landslips on the line. Also, on 19 June/20 June, parts of the town of Shifnal near Telford were flooded when the Wesley Brook burst its banks. Some of the residents blamed Severn Trent Water for opening floodgates at Priors Lee balancing lake, but no such gates existed. Repair costs to the railway were estimated at £2 million.

On 26 June, the Burway Bridge collapsed, disrupting one of the main roads into Ludlow, severing a gas main and causing the surrounding area to be evacuated.

On 1 July, a woman was pulled out of the River Severn at Jackfield on the Telford and Wrekin border near Ironbridge. By 24 July, the UK National Ballooning Championships in Ludlow had been cancelled for the first time in their 32-year history.

=== Warwickshire ===
By 21 July, flooded parts of Warwickshire included Alcester, Stratford-upon-Avon, Shipston on Stour and Water Orton. To a lesser extent, areas of Leamington Spa and Warwick also experienced flooding.

Several nature reserves in the Tame Valley, including Ladywalk and Kingsbury Water Park were badly affected, just as ground- and reedbed- nesting birds were hatching young.

=== West Midlands ===
200 people were forced to leave Witton Road and Tame Road in Aston, Birmingham when the River Tame flooded. Water entered the streets of Shirley, Solihull. As in Warwickshire, the Tame caused losses at a nature reserve; this time RSPB Sandwell Valley. In the Dudley borough, flooding damaged local schools, shops and communities. Schools opened their doors with parts of buildings flooded with water; damage in the West Midlands area was estimated at £1.9 billion (2007 GDP).

=== Wiltshire ===
On 20 July, Swindon had a month's rainfall in less than half a day. More than 50 people were rescued from their flooded homes.

=== Worcestershire ===
By 19 June, Worcestershire was affected by flooding. A 68-year-old motorist (Judge Eric Dickinson) died after becoming trapped in his vehicle in flood water near Pershore whilst attempting to cross an old ford in Bow Brook which was by then 2 m deep. The waters were still rising, endangering the confluence of the River Teme and the River Severn. On 26 June 2007 the New Road Ground, home to Worcestershire County Cricket Club, was flooded after the River Severn overtopped its banks, causing the next day's Twenty20 match against Warwickshire to be cancelled. On 17 July, Tenbury Wells in Worcestershire was flooded for the second time in three weeks after a thunderstorm caused flash flooding. By 21 July the M5 was affected, compounded by the closure of the Strensham services, and the motorway was closed, stranding hundreds in their vehicles overnight.

By 23 July, parts of Worcestershire were under 6 feet (2 m) of water and the Army was brought in to help emergency services supply the inhabitants of Upton-upon-Severn which was cut off by floodwater.

On 1 June, the first day of the floods, a road in Cropthorne near Worcester was brutally forced down by a high impact of water flowing underneath the road in a pipe. The hole it made was 13 feet (4.0 m) deep and 33 feet (10 m) wide, traffic throughout the county was held up due to the collapsed main road. The site was named Cropthorne Canyon.

=== East Riding of Yorkshire and Kingston upon Hull ===
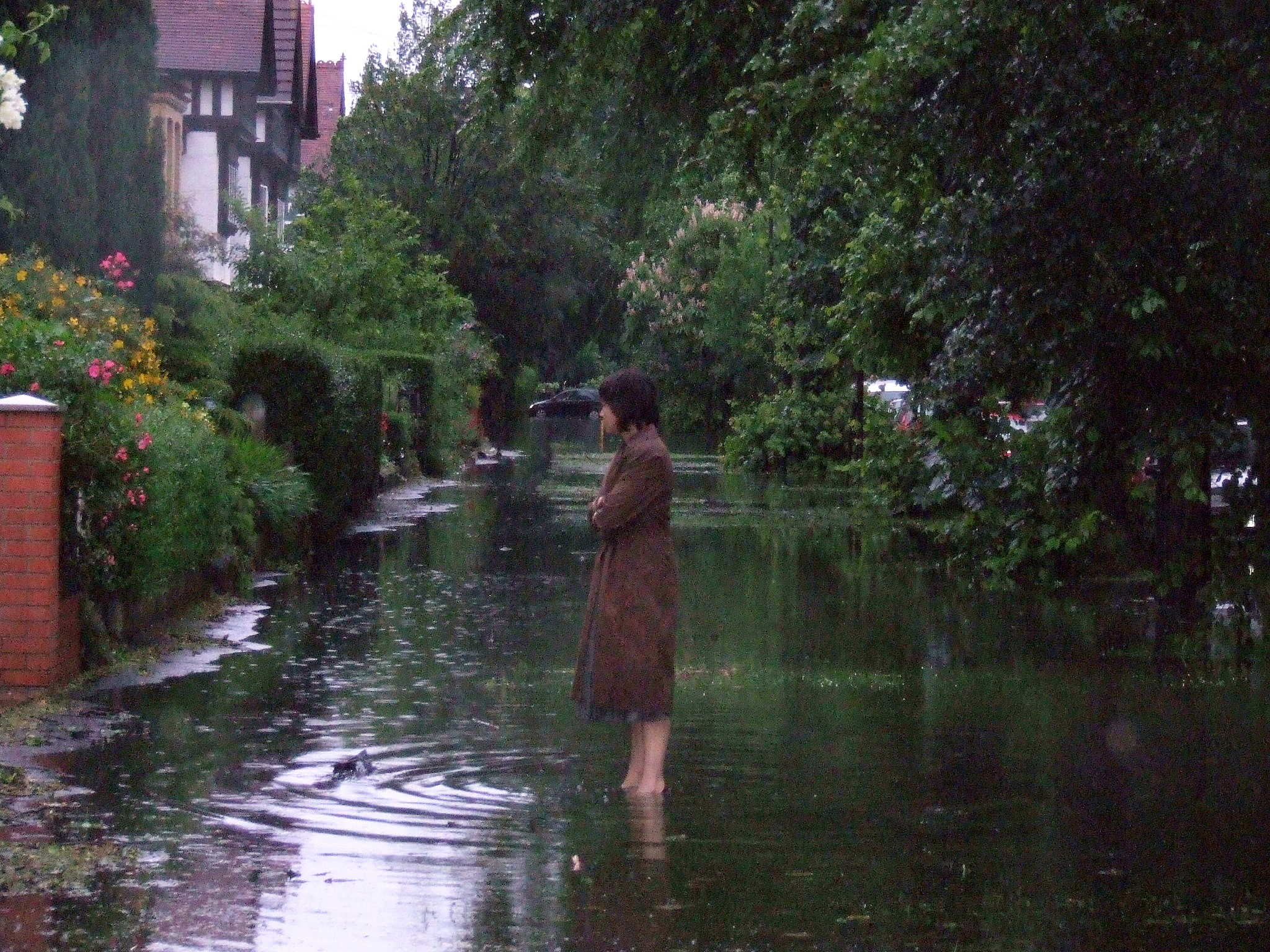
Floods in Hull (25 June 2007)

On 15 June, the region was hit by flooding. Roads including the A63 and A1105 in Hull and schools in the region were closed, the Hull Lord Mayor's Parade was cancelled, the Festival of Football was postponed, police declared a major incident, and Hessle, on the border between Hull City Council and East Riding of Yorkshire Council, suffered two square miles of severe sewage-contaminated flooding.

On 25 June, the region was hit by flooding again. Fire crews received over 1,500 calls in a 12-hour period, dozens of homes in Beverley and about 50 people at a Hull nursing home were evacuated, boats were used to evacuate about 90 people from 4 feet (1 m) of floodwater in Hull's County Road North, and in Hessle a 28-year-old man died after becoming trapped in a drain. The new Hull police station had to be vacated because of flooding. The next day, only 12 of Hull's 88 schools were still open, affecting 30,000 out of 38,000 Hull schoolchildren.

By 4 July in Hull, six schools were still closed and 120 residents in residential or nursing care had been relocated.

By 5 July, an estimated 35,000 people in streets containing 17,000 homes had been affected by flooding in Hull and by the next day more than 10,000 homes had been evacuated. Hull City Council estimated repair costs at £200 million.

By 24 July, Hull City Council had checked each house in the flooded streets and stated that 6,500 homes had been flooded.

By 27 July, £2.1 million had been allocated to Hull and £600,000 to the East Riding for clean-up and immediate repairs, and £3.2 million to Hull and £1.5 million to the East Riding for further repairs to the region's estimated 101 schools suffering significant flood damage.

By 3 September, figures released by Hull City Council had been revised upwards to 7,800 houses that had been flooded plus 1,300 businesses that were affected.

=== North Yorkshire ===
By 15 June, towns and villages in North Yorkshire were flooded, with Knaresborough, Harrogate and York being particularly affected. The A59 road at Kex Gill was closed due to a landslip where 100 tonnes (110 tons) of earth slid down the hillside and trapped a couple in their car. In Scarborough, the main A171 Scalby Road flooded outside Scarborough Hospital, and the ornamental lake at Peasholm Park overtopped its banks and poured down Peasholm Gap into North Bay. Near Catterick, North Yorkshire, a 17-year-old soldier on a training exercise from Catterick Garrison died after being swept away whilst crossing Risedale Beck, Hipswell Moor. On 23 June, flooding affected Middlesbrough. Pickering was flooded after Pickering Beck overflowed its banks. On 18 July, streams overflowed and roads were blocked in Barton, Gilling West, Melsonby, Hartforth, Scotch Corner, Middleton Tyas and Kirby Hill after a freak rainstorm, and on 18 July 2007 a cloud burst left parts of Filey under 3 feet (1 m) of water, just caused by the rain, rather than by a river bursting its banks. Pensioners were stranded in the town's swimming pool and rescued by lifeboat.

=== South Yorkshire ===
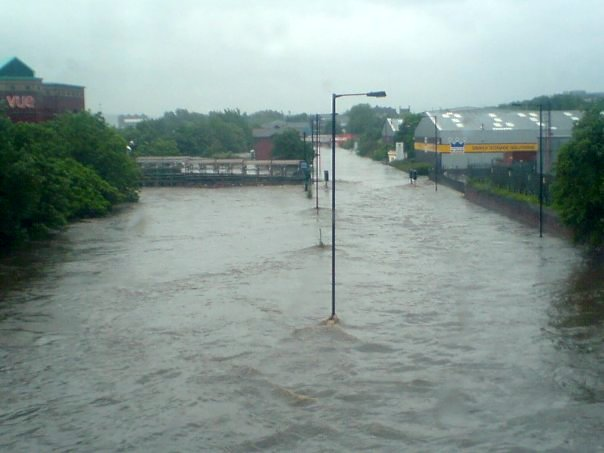
A road near the Meadowhall shopping centre showing extensive flooding after the River Don burst its banks

On 25 June, Sheffield suffered extensive damage as the River Don overtopped its banks, causing widespread flooding in the Don Valley area of the city. A 14-year-old boy was swept away by the swollen River Sheaf, a 68-year-old man died after attempting to cross a flooded road in Sheffield city centre, and several cattle were washed away, found up to 3.5 miles (5.6 km) across fields in some areas of cultivated land. The Meadowhall shopping centre was closed due to flooding with some shops remaining closed downstairs until late September and Sheffield Wednesday's ground Hillsborough was under 6 feet (1.83 m) of water. A number of people were rescued by RAF helicopters from buildings in the Brightside area, while in the Millhouses Park area to the southwest of the city the River Sheaf overtopped its banks causing widespread damage. There was also widespread flooding in Barnsley, Doncaster and Rotherham, with much of these towns cut off.

By 26 June, the waters in some parts of Sheffield and the surrounding area receded, and over 700 villagers from Catcliffe, near Rotherham's Ulley reservoir were evacuated after cracks appeared in the dam. Emergency services from across England pumped millions of gallons of water from the reservoir to ease the pressure on the damaged dam, and the nearby M1 Motorway was closed between junctions 32 and 36 as a precaution.

On 27 June, the Army moved into the Doncaster area after the River Don overtopped its banks and threatened the area around what was Thorpe Marsh Power Station. A man was incorrectly reported missing near the village of Adwick le Street near Doncaster.

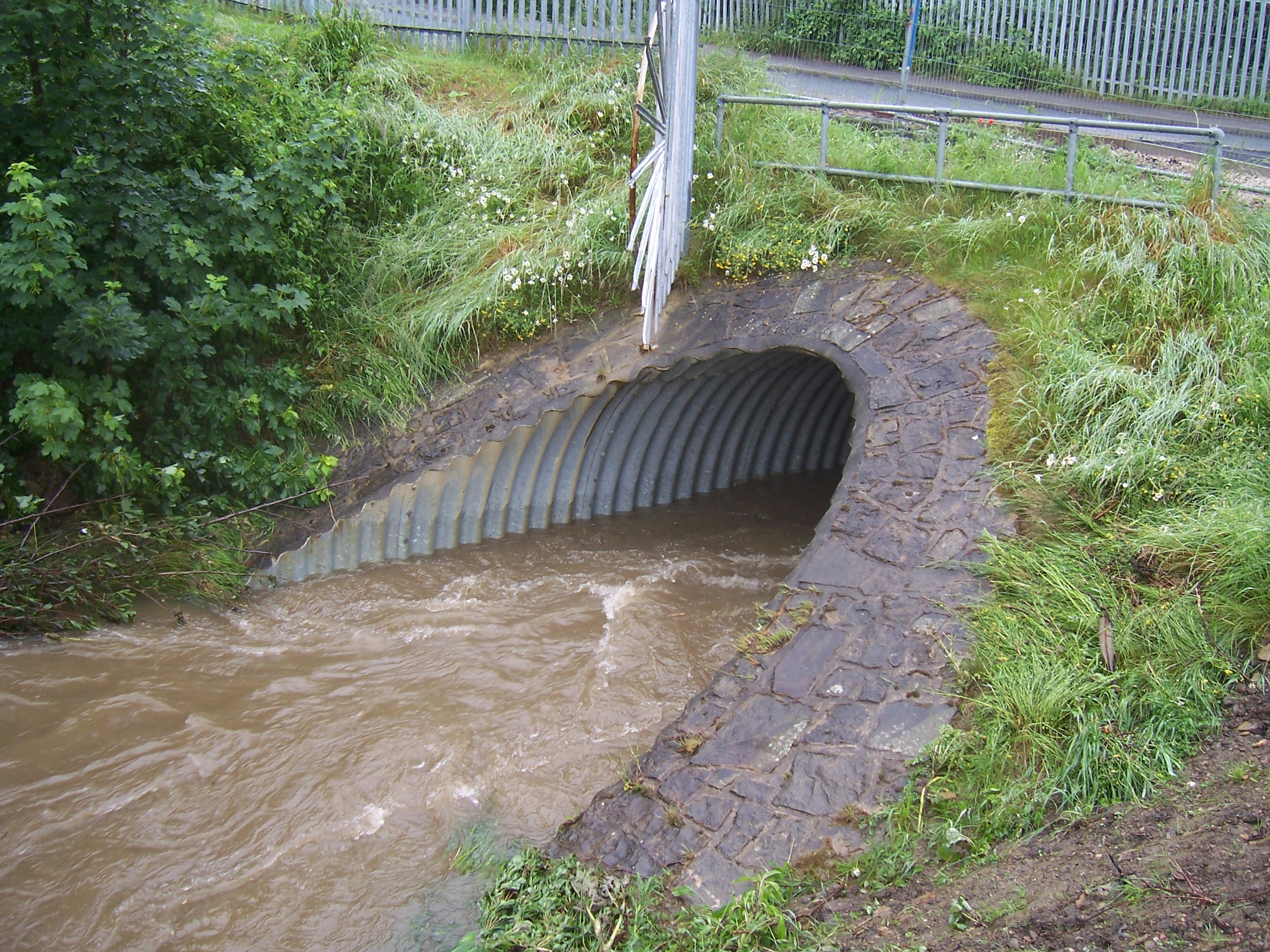
The river in Clayton West just after the flooding

=== West Yorkshire ===
On 15 June and on 25 June, the villages of Scissett and Clayton West and other parts of Kirklees were flooded by the River Dearne, the second time worse than the first.

On 25 June, Wakefield was flooded. Six elderly women, including a 91-year-old, were stranded in their homes.

During the Wakefield flood, hundreds of homes were evacuated in the Agbrigg area of Wakefield and looting was feared, but by 1 July only four looters had been arrested in the city and were later released on bail.

The village of Collingham (near Wetherby) was particularly affected by the flooding, and one house was looted.

== Affected areas in Wales ==
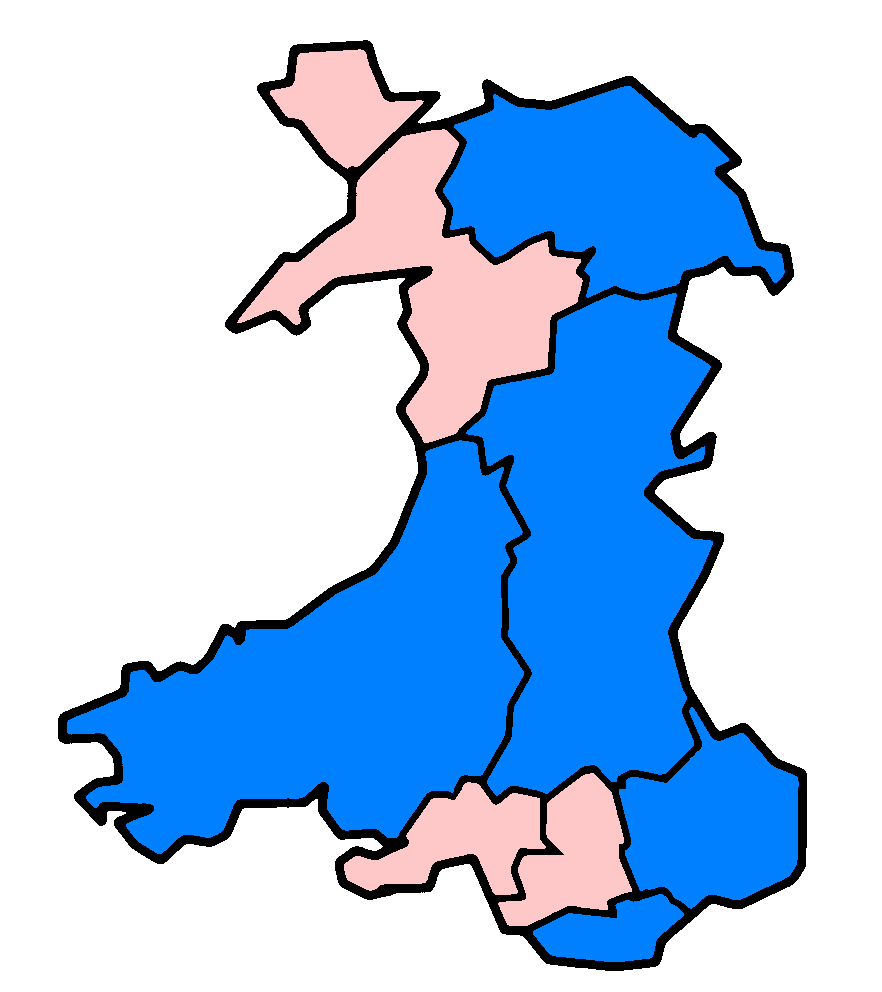
Non-administrative counties in Wales affected in June and July 2007 floods as of 24 July (marked in blue)

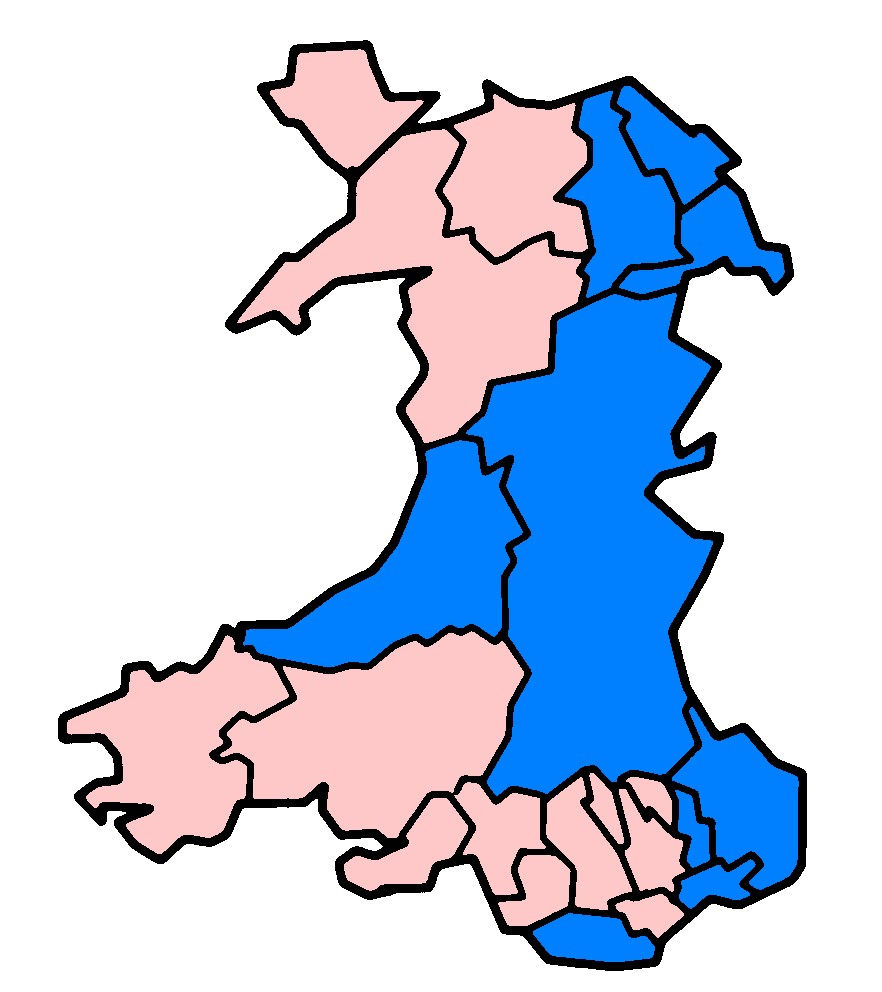
Principal areas in Wales affected in June and July 2007 floods as of 24 July (marked in blue)

Wales was hit by flooding in June and July, with the Eastern areas most badly affected. It was Wales's wettest June since 1998, and its second wettest since 1914. The preserved counties and principal areas affected are given below.

=== Clwyd ===
On 26 June, roads including the A5 were impassable at Corwen in Denbighshire, a river overflowed at Worthenbury in Flintshire, and properties were affected in Wrexham. In North Wales, a man was rescued by fire services after he was stranded on a small island in the River Dee in Llangollen, Denbighshire. On 17 July, flash floods after torrential rain forced the closure of a secondary school in Prestatyn in Denbighshire.

=== Dyfed ===
Lampeter in Ceredigion was affected by flooding on 11 June and then again on 15 June.

=== Gwent ===
On 26 June, properties were affected in Tintern on the River Wye in Monmouthshire. On 20 July, flash floods affected parts of Newport, Monmouthshire and Torfaen.

=== Powys ===
In Montgomeryshire, ten people were taken to safety at Tregynon and a dozen homes were flooded at Bettws Cedewain on 22 July, firefighters used a boat to evacuate five people from a house near Welshpool after they were cut off by floods on 23 July, and the same boat was later used to rescue three people stranded in a car on the A483. In Radnorshire, 30 tonnes of debris and earth blocked the only road out of Barland near Presteigne on 23 July. In Brecknockshire, the River Wye burst its banks in Builth Wells on 1 July, the saturated ground later causing chaos at the Royal Welsh Show in Llanelwedd on 24 July.

=== South Glamorgan ===
On 20 July, flash floods affected the Vale of Glamorgan, causing schools to be evacuated, roads to be closed, and boats used to rescue people from their homes in Barry.

== Affected areas in Northern Ireland ==
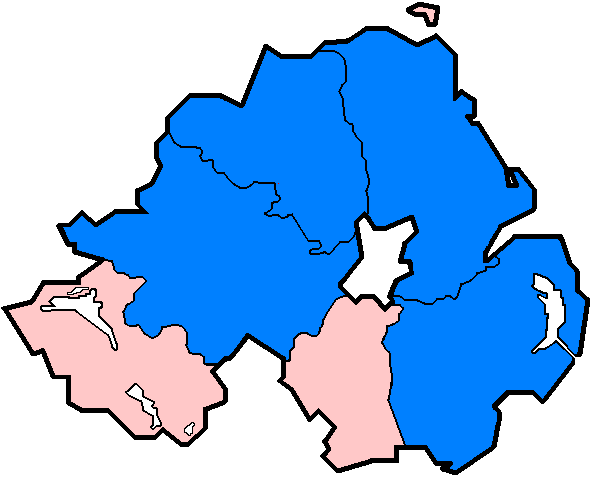
Non-administrative counties in Northern Ireland affected in June and July 2007 floods as of 24 July (marked in blue)

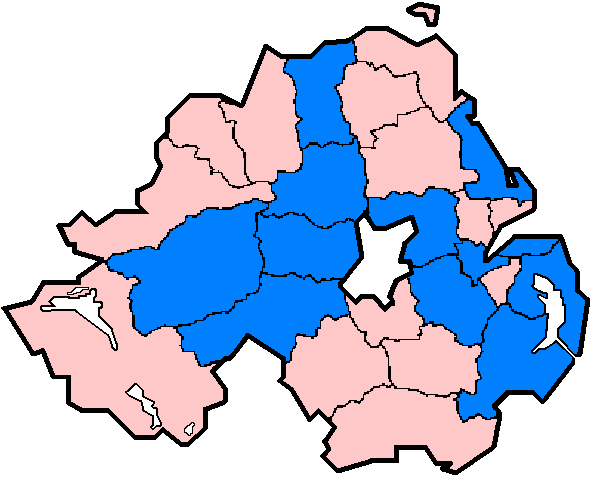
Districts in Northern Ireland affected in June and July 2007 floods as of 24 July (marked in blue)

Northern Ireland was hit by flooding in the June and July floods and it was Northern Ireland's wettest June since 1958. The non-administrative counties and districts affected are given below.

=== County Antrim ===
On 12 June, the Knockmore campus of the Lisburn Institute in Lisburn was affected by flooding. The same day, parts of East Belfast near the Antrim-Down border that were affected included the Kings Road, Ladas Drive, Strandtown Primary School and the Parliament Buildings in Stormont, with 80 residents evacuated from their old people's home on the Kings Road and Avoniel Leisure Centre opened to assist flood victims. On 2 July, houses were flooded and two people evacuated from their home in Cushendall in Antrim after the River Dall burst its banks following heavy rain. On 16 July, parts of Belfast International Airport near Aldergrove in Antrim were flooded by a freak thunderstorm leaving 10 planes unable to land, landslides closed the Antrim Coast Road near Ballygally, Larne, and people were trapped in their cars in Portrush, Coleraine.

=== County Down ===
On 15 June, there was severe flooding around Bangor in North Down, Saintfield, Crossgar and Ballynahinch in Down and Newtownards and Comber in Ards, with shops in Crossgar centre flooded.

=== County Londonderry ===
On 12 June, Magherafelt was affected by flooding. On 16 July, roads in Aghadowey, Coleraine and Portstewart, Coleraine were rendered impassable by floodwater.

=== County Tyrone ===
On 12 June, Omagh and Dungannon were affected by flooding, with a Dunnes supermarket evacuated in Omagh.

== Affected areas in Scotland ==
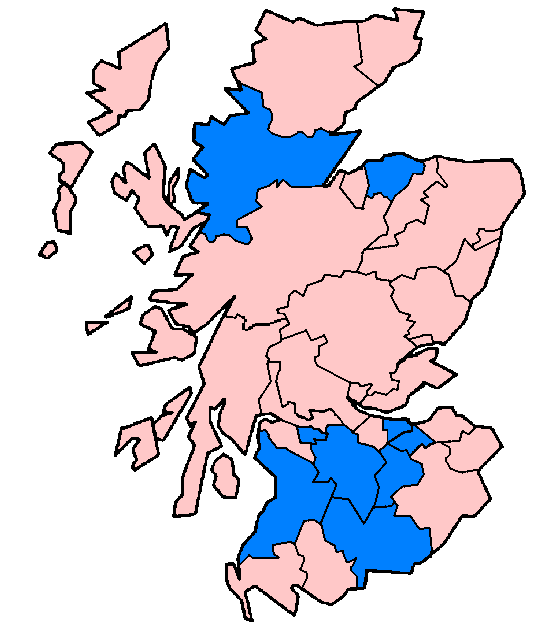
Lieutenancy areas of Scotland affected in June and July 2007 floods as of 24 July (marked in blue)

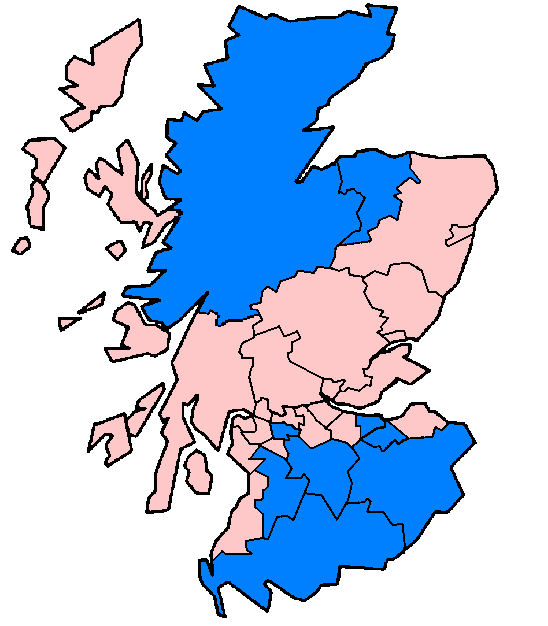
Council areas in Scotland affected in June and July 2007 floods as of 24 July (marked in blue)

Scotland was hit by flooding in June and July, with the Scottish Lowlands most badly affected. On 12 June, the Met Office issued torrential rain warnings for Scotland and it was Scotland's wettest June since 1938. The non-administrative counties and council areas affected are given below.

=== Ayrshire and Arran ===
On 21 June, about 2000 homes were left without electricity and properties were affected as flash floods hit Kilmarnock. On 18 July, flooding affected Kilmarnock again, the River Irvine burst its banks in Newmilns, and flash floods affected roads including the M77.

=== Dumfries ===
On 18 July, floods wrecked homes in Closeburn, power was cut off at Eaglesfield, and roads were closed at Moffat and Lochmaben.

=== Edinburgh and Midlothian ===
On 1 July, rain cancelled the one-day international cricket match between Scotland and Pakistan in Edinburgh and by 3 July parts of Midlothian were flooded, the worst-hit areas including residential areas in Dalkeith and Mayfield.

=== Glasgow and Lanarkshire ===
On 22 June, heavy storms flooded roads and dumped debris on the railway line in Glasgow. The same day, torrential rain caused a landslide just south of Lesmahagow, closing the M74.

=== Moray ===
On 3 July, a landslide caused by floodwater disrupted traffic on the A941 Rothes to Aberlour road in Moray.

=== Ross and Cromarty ===
On 18 July, heavy rain caused landslips blocking the railway line between Strathcarron and Achnasheen for a predicted 10 days,

=== Tweeddale ===
On 25 June rain forced the 108-year-old Beltane Festival in Peebles to be held indoors for the first time.

== Timeline for June and July floods ==
Areas affected by flooding during this period were as follows (see above for specific citations):

- 1–7 June:

England (Buckinghamshire)

- 8–14 June:

England (Lancashire),
Northern Ireland (Belfast, Cookstown, Dungannon, Lisburn, Magherafelt, Omagh),
Wales (Ceredigion)

- 15–21 June:

England (County Durham, Herefordshire, North and West Yorkshire, Shropshire, Worcestershire),
Northern Ireland (Ards, Down, North Down),
Scotland (Ayrshire, Lanarkshire),
Wales (Ceredigion)

- 22–28 June:

England (East Riding of Yorkshire, Hull, Nottinghamshire, Shropshire, Worcestershire, South Yorkshire),
Scotland (Peebles),
Wales (Denbighshire, Flintshire, Monmouthshire, Wrexham)

- 29 June – 5 July:

England (Buckinghamshire, Lancashire, West Yorkshire),
Northern Ireland (Antrim),
Scotland (Midlothian, Moray)

- 6–12 July:

De facto gap between the June and July floods

- 13–19 July:

England (County Durham, Cumbria, Lancashire, North Yorkshire, Worcestershire),
Northern Ireland (Coleraine, Larne),
Scotland (Ayrshire, Dumfriesshire, Ross and Cromarty),
Wales (Denbighshire)

- 20–26 July:

England (Bedfordshire, Berkshire, Buckinghamshire, Cambridgeshire, Gloucestershire, Greater London, Herefordshire, Lincolnshire, Oxfordshire, Warwickshire, Wiltshire, Worcestershire),
Wales (Newport, Monmouthshire, Powys, Torfaen, Vale of Glamorgan)

== Aftermath ==
=== Rescue effort ===
Following the flooding in late June, the rescue effort was described by the Fire Brigades Union as the "biggest in peacetime Britain". Following the flooding in July, the RAF said it was carrying out its biggest-ever peacetime rescue operation, with six Sea King helicopters from as far afield as RAF St Mawgan in Cornwall, RAF Valley in Anglesey and RAF Leconfield in the East Riding of Yorkshire rescuing up to 120 people. An RAF heavy lift Chinook helicopter was also employed to move aggregate to reinforce the banks of the River Don. The Environment Agency described the situation as "critical".

4x4 Response groups from throughout the UK assisted councils and blue light services during and in the immediate aftermath of the flooding. During the recovery phase a number of responders from around the UK 4x4 Response assisted the Red Cross in the distribution of fresh drinking water in the Gloucestershire area after mains drinking water was contaminated.

=== Health risks ===
The Health Protection Agency advised people that the risk of contracting any illness was low but that it was best to avoid coming into direct contact with flood water. There were no reported cases of any outbreaks. In some areas bottled water was handed out where sewage works got flooded.

=== Crop damage ===
The floods caused widespread crop damage, especially broccoli, carrots, peas and potatoes. In parts of Lincolnshire it was estimated that 40% of the pea crop may have been damaged, with other crops also suffering major losses. Prices of vegetables were expected to rise in the following months.

=== Financial cost ===
Environment Agency chief executive Baroness Young said that about £1 billion a year was needed to improve flood defences. The Association of British Insurers has estimated the total bill for the June and July floods as £3 billion.

A report by the Environment Agency in 2010 concluded that "the scale and seriousness of the summer 2007 floods were sufficient to classify them as a national disaster", and that the "total economic costs of the summer 2007 floods are estimated at about £3.2 billion in 2007 prices, within a possible range of between £2.5 billion and £3.8 billion.

=== Government response ===
On 3 July, Environment Secretary Hilary Benn announced that the Government would increase the spending on risk management and flood defences by £200 million to £800 million by 2010–11. During Prime Minister's Questions in the House of Commons later that month, Prime Minister Gordon Brown promised £46 million in aid to flood-hit councils and £800 million rise in annual spending on flood protection by 2010–11, confirming Hilary Benn's announcement. Brown also pledged to push insurance firms to make payouts.

On 22 July, the Government convened COBRA to co-ordinate the response to the crisis.

Visiting Gloucestershire on 25 July, Mr. Brown praised emergency services for their efforts, but added: "We've got to get the supplies stepped up. We will get more tankers in, we will get more bowsers in, we will get more regular filling of them, and at the same time, more bottled water will be provided."

On 8 August 2007, Defra announced that Sir Michael Pitt would chair an independent review of the response to the flooding. On 4 September of that year the Cabinet Office website launched a comments page to let people affected by the flooding contribute their experiences to the review.

Sir Michael published his interim report on 17 December 2007.

In April 2010 the government passed the Flood and Water Management Act 2010, which implemented many of Sir Michael Pitt's recommendations. The Act gives more power and responsibility to the Environment Agency and local authorities to plan flood defences co-ordinated across catchment areas and the wider country, to counteract the tendency for defences to be built for upstream areas without much thought for how this might be making flooding worse for downstream areas. In also brings in a new regime whereby new building activity which exacerbates flooding by reducing the capacity of land to absorb water will need to be accompanied by the construction of sustainable drainage systems such as grassy roofs, ponds and soakaways.

=== Criticism of Hull City Council ===
Hull City Council was criticised for not insuring the city's libraries, schools and other public buildings. In response, Hull City Council said that "Many councils do not have the feature in their budget", but other flood-hit councils were insured. It was thought that council tax payers would be left with the bill, as emergency Government funding would not cover it.

=== Criticism of government response ===
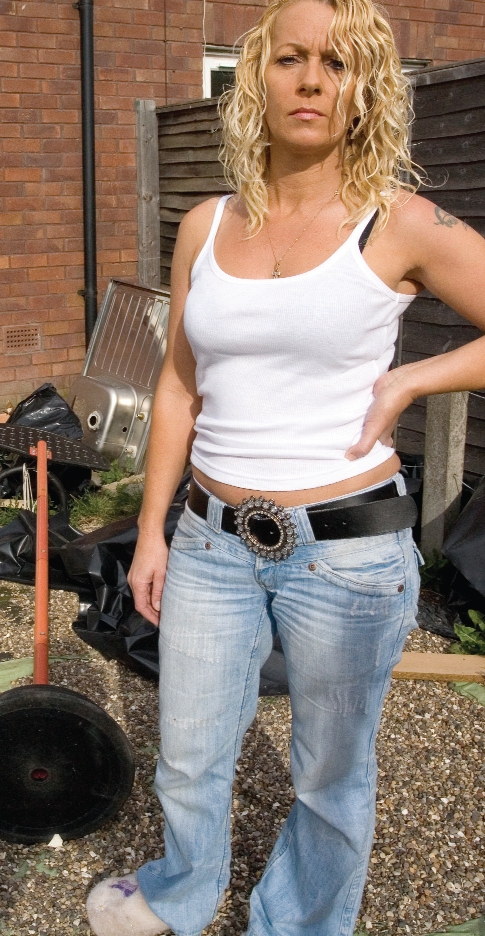
Jenna Meredith, one of the victims of flooding, was one of the most high-profile critics of the government response

In June, councillors in Hull claimed that the city was being forgotten and had the floods occurred in the Home Counties, help would have arrived much more quickly. One in five homes in Hull was damaged and 90 out of the city's 105 schools suffered some damage. Damage to the schools alone was estimated to cost £100 million. The Bellwin scheme for providing aid after natural disasters was criticised as inadequate by Hull MP Diana Johnson. The lack of media coverage of flooding in Kingston upon Hull led the city council leader Carl Minns to dub Hull "the forgotten city".

In July, the Government came under mounting criticism of its handling of the crisis, the fact that responsibilities were spread across four departments and no single minister could be held responsible, and the fact that the Army had not been called in to assist.

The Observer newspaper stated on 22 July 2007 that the Government had been warned in the spring by the Met Office that summer flooding would be likely because the El Niño phenomenon had weakened, but no action was taken.

In response to the criticism, Environment Secretary Hilary Benn said on BBC Sunday AM that "This was very, very intense rainfall, with five inches in 24 hours in some areas; even some of the best defences are going to be overwhelmed". He praised the way the emergency services had dealt with "unprecedented" levels of rainfall and said he had "total confidence" in the response of the Environment Agency.

Conservative leader David Cameron called for a public inquiry into the flooding after visiting Witney, the main town in his Oxfordshire constituency.

Then Liberal Democrat leader Sir Menzies Campbell accused the government of lack of preparation leading to a "summer of suffering", and said, "With sophisticated weather forecasting as we now have, particularly in relation to what's happened over the weekend, there are quite a few questions as to how it was that flood-prevention measures were not in place or were not more effective."

== See also ==
- List of natural disasters in Britain and Ireland
  - 2009 Great Britain and Ireland floods
  - Great Sheffield Flood
- Flood risk assessment
- Rihanna Curse
