= Walham =

Hamlet in Gloucestershire, England

Coordinates: 51°52′44″N 2°15′2″W

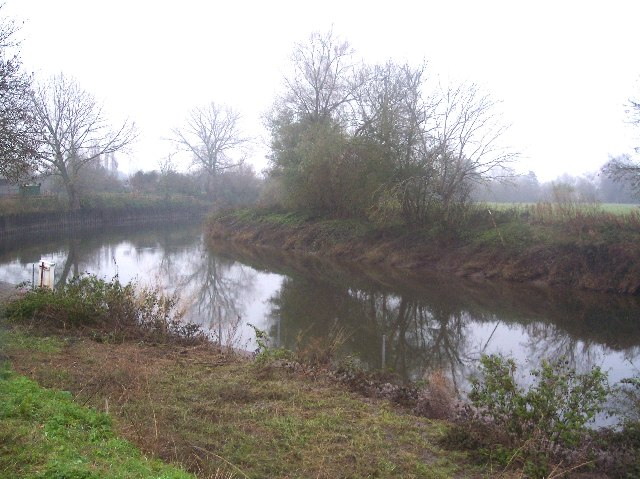
The River Severn at the 'White Horse', Walham.

Walham is a hamlet in Longford parish, north of Gloucester, England. It lies on the banks of the River Severn and north of the A40 road. It is a suburb of Gloucester, which is to its south.

A National Grid substation, providing power to half a million homes and the Government Communications Headquarters (GCHQ), is situated at Walham. The substation came to national prominence in July 2007, when it was threatened by a major flood. The fire service and military stopped the flood waters two inches below the height at which the plant would flood. This struggle with nature was dubbed the "Battle for Walham" in national newspapers.

== Battle for Walham ==
The Battle for Walham was the fight by emergency services and the Environment Agency to save the National Grid 400 kV substation at Walham. When the River Severn burst its banks during the Gloucestershire floods of 2007, the fire brigade, Army, Royal Navy, Royal Air Force and the Environment Agency joined forces to save the threatened substation.

The water came within two inches of overtopping (flooding) the substation controls before receding.

The Environment Agency's Rivers and Coastal Group committee were unanimous in their decision to award the Chairman's Award prize jointly to the Environment Agency and Gloucestershire Fire and Rescue teams for their work to save Walham.

== See also ==
- Global storm activity of 2007
- 2007 United Kingdom floods
