= Kerala Water Authority =

Government water regulation authority in Kerala, India

- Type: Public sector
- Industry: Water supply, sewerage
- Founded: 1 April 1984
- Headquarters: Jalabhavan, Vellayambalam, Thiruvananthapuram, Kerala, India
- Key people: Mons Joseph (Minister for Water Resources); Jeevan Babu K. IAS (Managing Director); Dr. Binu Francis IAS (Joint Managing Director)
- Owner: Water Resources Department, Government of Kerala
- Website: www.kwa.kerala.gov.in

Kerala Water Authority is an autonomous authority established for the development and regulation of water supply and waste water collection and disposal in the state of Kerala, India. It is a government-owned organization and hence a monopoly in most parts of the state. The authority was founded on 1 April 1984. The Authority has its head office in Thiruvananthapuram. Kerala Water Authority is governed by a board chaired by the Chairman, usually the Principal Secretary / Secretary, Water Resources Department, Government of Kerala. The board also includes the secretaries of the departments of finance, local self-government, the executive director of KRWSA, Managing Director, Technical member, Accounts Member of Kerala Water Authority and three members from local self-government institutions.

== See also ==
- Maradu Water Treatment Plant
