= Civil Air Support =

- Abbreviation: CAS
- Predecessor: Sky Watch/Sky Watch Civil Air Patrol/SWCAP
- Formation: 2000
- Founded at: United Kingdom
- Type: Nonprofit
- Legal status: Registered charity
- Purpose: To assist agencies, emergency services and individuals
- Location: United Kingdom
- Region served: United Kingdom
- Services: Environmental, humanitarian and community support
- Methods: Airborne observation
- Fields: Aviation
- Members: Over 150
- Official language: English
- Volunteers: Over 150 (2025)
- Award: Largest charitable air observation organisation in Europe
- Formerly called: Sky Watch/Sky Watch Civil Air Patrol/SWCAP
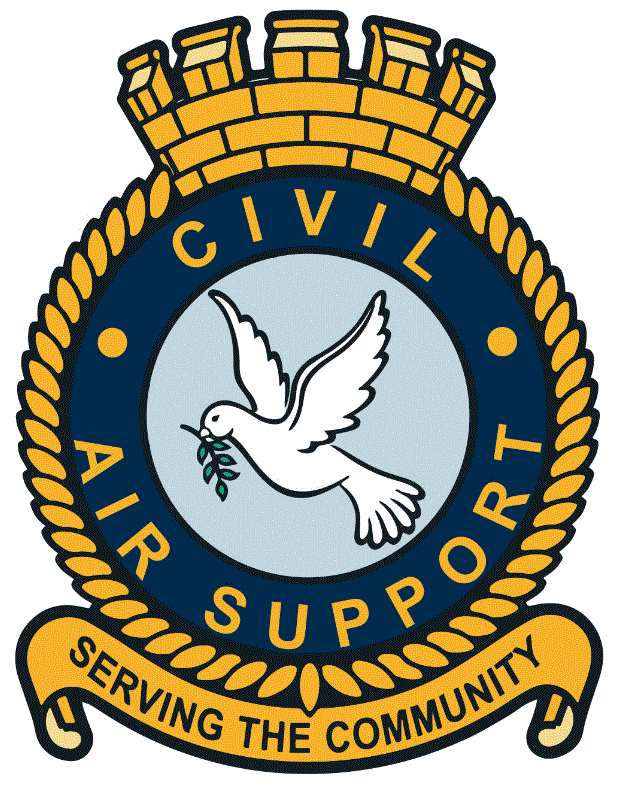
- [1] Largest charitable air observation organisation in Europe Current crest of Civil Air Support CIO registered charity

Civil Air Support (formerly known as Sky Watch/Sky Watch Civil Air Patrol/SWCAP) is a volunteer civil aviation organisation founded in 2000 in the United Kingdom. Civil Air Support federates the efforts of small aircraft, microlight and Unmanned Aerial Vehicle (UAV) pilots to assist agencies, emergency services and individuals. The registered charity provides complementary environmental, humanitarian and community support to those who would otherwise have no access to airborne assistance. Civil Air Support will not compete with established air resources and will only operate when the alternative is no air support at all.

It has over 150 members and is the "largest charitable air observation organisation in Europe". All Civil Air Support members are volunteers and all flights are private. Members are either pilots, observers or operate in a supporting role. Many of the charity's pilots are highly experienced, ex-military or from a commercial aviation background.

Civil Air Support is currently separated into Transport and Search and Reconnaissance Groups. The Transport Group, capable of small payload deliveries generally within the UK and Ireland, has access to twin engine piston, single engine turbine and other low wing types generally capable of IFR operations. The Search and Reconnaissance Group utilises smaller, mainly high wing VFR types ideally suited to ground observation and photography roles. All observation, search and photography is carried out by trained observers.

While similar in function to the United States Civil Air Patrol, Civil Air Support is considerably younger and does not have the same degree of integration with the air force/naval aviation.

== See also ==
- Civil defense
- 4x4 Response
- Lighthouse Authorities
- Incident response team
