= Maradu Water Treatment Plant =

Water treatment plant in Kochi, Kerala, India

- The facility as seen from Crowne Plaza Kochi.
- Location: Maradu, Kochi, Kerala, India
- Coordinates: 09°55′55″N 76°19′10″E
- Industry: Water supply
- Products: Drinking water (100 million litres per day)
- Owner: Kerala Water Authority

The Maradu Water Treatment Plant (also sometimes called Kerala 100 MLD Water Treatment Plant and Maradu Drinking Water Project) is a potable water production facility located in Maradu, a suburb of Kochi, Kerala. Operated by the Kerala Water Authority, the plant has a treatment capacity of 100 million litres per day (MLD). It supplies drinking water to approximately 250,000 residents across the Kochi Corporation area and surrounding local bodies, notably addressing the acute water shortages in West Kochi.

== Background ==
Historically, the drinking water requirements for the area were predominantly served by the KWA headworks located in Aluva, which extracted water from the Periyar River. While the daily water demand of the city and its surrounding municipalities reached roughly 360 MLD, the Aluva plant's production capacity was limited to 225 MLD. This resulted in a severe daily deficit of 135 MLD, disproportionately affecting neighborhoods at the tail end of the distribution network, particularly in West Kochi, Kumbalangi, and Chellanam.

To mitigate this crisis, the Government of India cleared the Maradu drinking water project under the Jawaharlal Nehru National Urban Renewal Mission (JNNURM) in February 2007. A Memorandum of Understanding was signed between the Kochi Municipal Corporation and the Kerala Water Authority in November 2007.

== Project details and infrastructure ==
Construction of the project commenced in 2008. The initial estimated cost was ₹201.17 crore (US$21 million), but various hurdles related to land acquisition and road works delayed the project from its original 2010 deadline. The cost eventually escalated to ₹252 crore (US$26 million) by the time of its completion.

Unlike the Aluva plant, which relies on the Periyar river, the Maradu Water Treatment Plant abstracts raw water from Pazhoorkkadavu on the Muvattupuzha River, located near Piravom. The raw water is first pumped to a collection reservoir at Arakkunnam, which has a storage capacity of 43 MLD. From there, it is transferred to the main treatment facility in Maradu for purification.

The project also included the construction of elevated overhead tanks to facilitate gravity-fed distribution to the target regions. These tanks were constructed in Chellanam (45 MLD), Kumbalam (15 MLD), and Maradu (15 MLD).

The plant was officially inaugurated and commissioned on 2 February 2016 by the then Chief Minister of Kerala, Oommen Chandy.

== Operational incidents ==
In late January 2023, two of the three 804-horsepower raw water extraction pumps at the Pazhoor pump house broke down simultaneously. This abruptly halted the supply of water to the Maradu plant, plunging the West Kochi region into a month-long water crisis. Residents were forced to depend on water tanker lorries until the KWA repaired the submerged pumps and restored normal 95 MLD pumping operations by early March 2023.

Starting in December 2025, recurrent electrical maintenance issues and equipment breakdowns at the Pazhoor pump house again caused significant disruptions to the plant's production. By January 2026, the resultant shortfall strained the Kochi Municipal Corporation's finances, as the civic body was forced to exceed its budgetary limits to hire private water tankers to distribute emergency water to affected neighbourhoods.

== See also ==
- Kerala Water Authority
- Water supply and sanitation in India
