= 4x4 Response =

UK logistic support charity

4×4 Response Network logo

4x4 Response is a UK based charity whose volunteers offer the use of their 4×4 vehicles to provide logistic support in adverse conditions, working with other Voluntary Organisations and the blue-light emergency services. The Charity was set up to assist or facilitate 4×4 drivers that wanted to form a group in an area where there was no group currently in existence. The charity itself, while largely consisting of volunteers, in itself, is not a response group.

== History ==
The emergency services have a history of calling on 4x4 owners in times of need, and volunteers with 4x4s have grouped together in the UK for a number of years.

In 1999 4x4 Response was established as a response group in Norfolk, and in 2005 national links were developed into a more formal association, resulting in the formation of the 4x4 Response Network in 2006.

In the Autumn of 2008, 4x4 Response became a registered charity (Charity number: 1126138), recognised by the Department for Communities and Local Government.

== Operations ==
Although a national organisation, the charity operates through an affiliated network of thirty-two local groups. Each group has its own formalised Memoranda of Understanding with its user agencies, which include Category One and Category Two responders as defined by the Civil Contingencies Act 2004. These organisations include:

- Local Authority Emergency Planning Offices
- Police
- Ambulance Services
- St. John Ambulance
- Red Cross
- Doctors' Associations.

Most 4x4 Response groups are members of their Local Resilience Forum (LRF) and are an integral part of local resilience plans along with other voluntary organisations.

Groups are typically called out in response to instances of snow or flooding, or where access is required across rough terrain or where a conventional vehicle might otherwise be unsuitable, and typical tasks involve transporting personnel or equipment. Although they may work closely with emergency services, military and other Govt organisations, volunteers have no special status and no vehicular exemptions under the Road Traffic Act.

== Local groups ==
As of December 2015 there are thirty-two local groups which cover almost the whole of Great Britain and the Isle of Man. Each group operates independently, but in the event of a major incident additional resources can be drawn from neighbouring groups. In most cases only one group serves a particular geographic area, although there are some exceptions, and to aid identification each group is allocated a two-letter code which forms the prefix for their volunteers' call-signs.

The services offered by each group varies according to local circumstances and geography; for example the Highlands of Scotland present different challenges to the fenland areas of Norfolk.

Group	Region	Call-Sign Prefix	Areas Served
Beds and Cambs 4x4 Response	East of England	BC	Bedfordshire, Cambridgeshire
Bux & Oxon Response Group (BORG)	South East	BU	Buckinghamshire, Oxfordshire
Cumbria 4x4 Response	Cumbria	CU	Cumbria
Devon & Cornwall 4x4 Response	South West	DC	Devon, Cornwall
Derbyshire 4x4 Response	Derbyshire	DE	Derbyshire
Essex Rover Rescue	East of England	ES	Essex
Gloucestershire & Worcestershire 4x4 Response	South West & West Midlands	GR	Gloucestershire, Worcestershire
Herefordshire 4x4 Response	Central	HE	Herefordshire
Highland 4x4 Response	Scotland	HI	Scottish Highlands
Hampshire & Berkshire 4x4 Response	South East	HR	Hampshire, Berkshire
Hertfordshire 4x4 Response	Central	HT	Hertfordshire, North London
Leicestershire & Rutland 4x4 Response	East Midlands	LE	Leicestershire, Rutland
Lincolnshire 4x4 Response	East Midlands	LN	Lincolnshire
Lothian 4x4 Response	Scotland	LR	Edinburgh, Lothian, Clackmannanshire, Stirling and the Scottish Borders
Manx 4x4 Response	Isle of Man	IM	Isle of Man
MROC 4x4 Response	West Midlands	MR	Warwickshire, Coventry & Solihull
4x4 Response North East	North East	NE	Northumberland, County Durham, North Yorkshire (Middlesbrough and Redcar & Cleveland)
Northants 4x4 Response	East Midlands	NH	Northamptonshire
Northern Ireland 4x4 Response	Northern Ireland	NI	Northern Ireland
Nottinghamshire 4x4 Response	East Midlands	NM	Nottinghamshire
Norfolk & Suffolk 4x4 Response, Founding group	East of England	NS	Norfolk, Suffolk
North West 4x4 Response	North West	NW	Cheshire, Lancashire, Merseyside, Greater Manchester,
Strathclyde 4x4 Response	Scotland	SC	Argyll and Bute, Ayrshire, Lanarkshire, Renfrewshire, Dunbartonshire, Glasgow, Inverclyde
South East 4x4 Response	South East	SE	Kent
Sussex 4x4 Response	South East	SX	East Sussex, West Sussex
Surrey 4x4 Response	South East	SY	Surrey and South West London
Tayside 4x4 Response	Scotland	TA	Tayside, Dundee City, Perth and Kinross
Vectis 4x4 Response	South East	VE	Isle of Wight
4x4 Response Wales	Wales	WA	Wales
Wessex 4x4 Response	South West	WE	Somerset, Dorset, Wiltshire, Bristol
West Midlands 4x4 Response	West Midlands	WM	West Midlands, Shropshire, Staffordshire
Yorkshire 4x4 Response	Yorkshire	YR	North Yorkshire, South Yorkshire, West Yorkshire, East Riding of Yorkshire

As of July 2020. London is covered jointly by the four groups covering the neighbouring areas.

In some parts of the country, other organisations which are not part of the 4x4 Response network offer similar services.

== Volunteers and vehicles ==
A wide range of vehicles are used by the volunteers, who own and maintain them at their own expense. Typical vehicles include various models of Land Rover, and four-wheel drive vehicles from many other manufacturers including Jeep, Nissan, Toyota, Škoda, Suzuki and Ford. Although not necessary for the role, some are modified with additional equipment such as Winches or modifications for wading in deeper water, but many are of standard specification.

As volunteers are expected to take to the roads in potentially severe conditions they carry additional equipment in their vehicles to keep them and any passengers safe and warm. Many volunteers are also trained in first-aid, advanced driving or water rescue, and each group offers training in the risks most relevant to their operating areas.

Volunteers typically receive a contribution towards their fuel costs, but are otherwise unpaid. Volunteers are eligible for emergency services discounts through the Blue Light Card.

== See also ==
- Civil defense
- Civil Air Support
- Lighthouse Authorities
- Incident response team
