= List of law enforcement agencies in the United Kingdom, Crown Dependencies and British Overseas Territories =

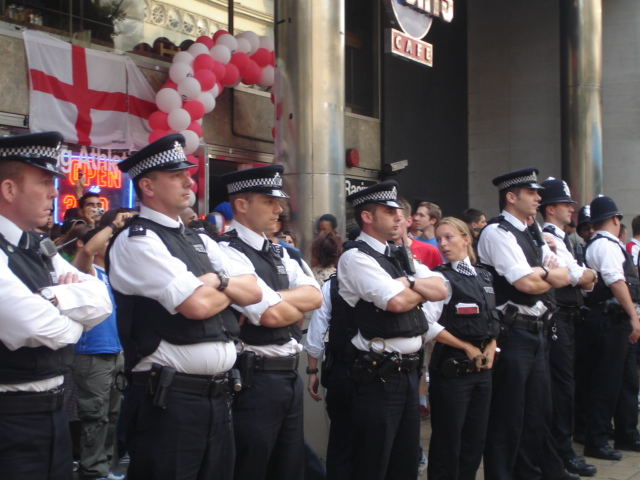
Metropolitan Police officers on crowd control to prevent football hooliganism after England lost to Portugal, 1 July 2006

There are a number of agencies that participate in law enforcement in the United Kingdom which can be grouped into three general types:

- Territorial police forces, who carry out the majority of policing. These are police forces that cover a police area (a particular region) and have an independent police authority. Current police forces have their grounding in the Police Act 1996 (in England and Wales), the Police and Fire Reform (Scotland) Act 2012 (in Scotland) and the Police (Northern Ireland) Act 2000 (in Northern Ireland), which prescribe a number of issues such as appointment of a chief constable, jurisdiction and responsibilities.
- National law enforcement bodies, including the National Crime Agency and national police forces that have a specific, non-regional jurisdiction, such as the British Transport Police. The Serious Organised Crime and Police Act 2005 refers to these as 'special police forces', not including the NCA which is not a police force. In addition, there are non-police law enforcement agencies, whose officers are not police officers, but still enforce laws, and other bodies with solely investigatory powers.
- Miscellaneous police bodies, mostly having their foundations in older legislation or common law. These are responsible for policing specific local areas or activities, such as ports and parks. Before the passing of recent legislation such as the Serious Organised Crime and Police Act 2005, they were often referred to as 'special police forces'; care must therefore be taken in interpreting historical use of that phrase. These constabularies are not within the scope of the legislation applicable to the previously mentioned organisations but can still be the subject of statutes applicable to, for example, docks, harbours or railways. Until the passing of the Railways and Transport Safety Act 2003, the British Transport Police was such a force.

Most law enforcement in the United Kingdom is carried out by territorial police forces that police the general public and their activities. The other types of agencies are concerned with policing of more specific matters.

Over the centuries there has been a wide variation in the number of police forces in the United Kingdom, with a large number now no longer in existence.

== Territorial police forces ==
Most policing in the United Kingdom is conducted by the 45 territorial police forces of the 4 nations in one of three legal criminal jurisdictions – England & Wales, Scotland and Northern Ireland. These forces are ultimately responsible for all law and order within their respective police area (a legal term which defines the geographic area of primary responsibility). This is not the same as legal jurisdiction, see below. Two nations of the United Kingdom, Scotland and Northern Ireland, have national police forces. The third legal jurisdiction, made up of the nations of England and Wales is split up into a number of police forces. The breakdown of all territorial police forces across the United Kingdom by jurisdiction is as follows:

- 43 territorial police forces in England & Wales
- 1 territorial police force in Scotland
- 1 territorial police force in Northern Ireland

=== England and Wales ===
Police forces in England and Wales

Except in Greater London, each territorial police force covers one or more of the local government areas (counties) established in the 1974 local government reorganisations (although with subsequent modifications), in an area known in statute as a police area. These forces provide most of the policing services to the public of England and Wales. These forces have been known historically as "Home Office police forces" due to the central government department, the Home Office, being responsible for and providing most of the funding these police forces. Despite the implication of the term, all police forces are independent, with operational control resting solely with the chief officer of each force (the chief constable or with regard to the Metropolitan Police and City of London Police forces, their respective Commissioners); each force was overseen by a police authority until these were replaced by police and crime commissioners in 2012.

The Police Act 1996 is the most recent piece of legislation, which outlines the areas of responsibility for the 43 territorial forces of England and Wales (found in Schedule 1 of the Act).

Constable is the lowest rank in the police service, but all officers, whatever their rank, are "constables" in terms of legal powers and jurisdiction. Police officers in territorial police forces in England and Wales derive their jurisdiction from Section 30 of the Police Act 1996. This section outlines that such officers have jurisdiction throughout England and Wales and also the adjacent United Kingdom waters. Special constables, who are part-time, volunteer officers of these forces, used to have a more limited jurisdiction – limited solely to their own force areas and adjacent forces. Since 1 April 2007, however special constables of England and Wales have full police powers throughout those two countries. This means that, in contrast to most countries, all UK volunteer police officers now have exactly the same powers as their full-time colleagues. There are a number of situations in which the jurisdiction of a constable extends to one of the other countries, and constables of one jurisdiction do have reciprocal powers of arrest in each other's jurisdictions as a matter of course – see the main article for details.

==== England ====
Police forces in England For the numbers see the list (left/below).

1. Avon and Somerset Police
2. Bedfordshire Police
3. Cambridgeshire Constabulary
4. Cheshire Constabulary
5. City of London Police (not shown)
6. Cleveland Police
7. Cumbria Constabulary
8. Derbyshire Constabulary
9. Devon and Cornwall Police
10. Dorset Police
11. Durham Constabulary
12. Essex Police
13. Gloucestershire Constabulary
14. Greater Manchester Police
15. Hampshire and Isle of Wight Constabulary
16. Hertfordshire Constabulary
17. Humberside Police
18. Kent Police
19. Lancashire Constabulary
20. Leicestershire Police
21. Lincolnshire Police
22. Merseyside Police
23. Metropolitan Police Service
24. Norfolk Constabulary
25. Northamptonshire Police
26. Northumbria Police
27. North Yorkshire Police
28. Nottinghamshire Police
29. South Yorkshire Police
30. Staffordshire Police
31. Suffolk Constabulary
32. Surrey Police
33. Sussex Police
34. Thames Valley Police
35. Warwickshire Police
36. West Mercia Police
37. West Midlands Police
38. West Yorkshire Police
39. Wiltshire Police

As of September 2020, the police forces in England have:

- 124,492 police officers
- 8,634 special constables
- 8,659 police community support officers (PCSO)
- 7,504 police support volunteers (PSV)
- 76,466 staff

==== Wales ====
Police forces in Wales For the numbers see the list (left/below).

1. Dyfed-Powys Police (Heddlu Dyfed Powys)
2. Gwent Police (Heddlu Gwent)
3. North Wales Police (Heddlu Gogledd Cymru)
4. South Wales Police (Heddlu De Cymru)

As of September 2020, the police forces in Wales have:

- 7,274 police officers
- 492 special constables
- 834 police community support officers (PCSO)
- 387 police support volunteers (PSV)
- 4,774 staff

There have also been proposals for an all-Wales police force, such as in 2006.

==== Collaborative units ====
- South East Counter Terrorism Unit
- Thames Valley & Hampshire Joint Operations Unit
- Surrey Police & Sussex Police Tactical Firearms, Operations Command and Roads Policing Unit
- South West Counter Terrorism Unit
- Dorset Police and Devon & Cornwall Police Strategic Alliance Unit
- East Counter Terrorism Intelligence Unit
- Norfolk & Suffolk Roads Policing Unit
- Bedfordshire, Cambridgeshire & Hertfordshire Road Policing Unit
- Bedfordshire, Cambridgeshire & Hertfordshire Major Crime Unit
- East Midlands Counter Terrorism Intelligence Unit
- West Midlands Police Counter Terrorism Unit
- Warwickshire Police and West Mercia Police Specialist Operations Unit
- North West Counter Terrorism Unit
- Cheshire Police & North Wales Police Alliance Armed Policing Unit
- North East Counter Terrorism Unit
- Durham and Cleveland Specialist Operations Unit
- Welsh Extremism and Counter Terrorism Unit
- Gwent Police & South Wales Police Joint Armed Response Unit

=== Scotland ===
Police Scotland

Most police powers and functions have been inherited by the Scottish Government and Scottish Parliament from the former Scottish Office (1885–1999). Areas for which legislative responsibility remains with the UK Government include national security, terrorism, firearms and drugs. The Police (Scotland) Act 1967, as amended, was the basis for the organisation and jurisdiction of the eight former territorial forces in Scotland that were formed in 1975. These forces covered one or more of the areas of the local government regions established in the 1975 local government reorganisation (and since abolished), with minor adjustments to align with the post-1996 council area borders. These forces provided most of the police services to the public of Scotland, although Scottish police officers also have limited jurisdiction throughout the rest of the United Kingdom as required (See above comments under English and Welsh forces).

In 2011, the Scottish Government announced that it planned to amalgamate the eight territorial forces in Scotland, along with the Scottish Crime and Drug Enforcement Agency, into a single agency. (Note: The eight Scottish territorial forces were Central Scotland Police, Dumfries and Galloway Constabulary, Fife Constabulary, Grampian Police, Lothian and Borders Police, Northern Constabulary, Strathclyde Police and Tayside Police) The Police and Fire Reform (Scotland) Act 2012, an Act of the Scottish Parliament, codified this amalgamation and brought about the new Police Service of Scotland (to be known as "Police Scotland"). The new force was established on 1 April 2013.

In 2017, plans were being debated in the Scottish Parliament to merge railway policing with Police Scotland.

As of December 2019, police numbers in Scotland were:

- Police officers: 17,259
- Special constables: 531
- Other staff: 6,168

Community Support Officers, commonly referred to as "Police Community Support Officers", were established by Section 38(2) of the Police Reform Act 2002, which applies only to England and Wales. There are therefore no Community Support Officers in Scotland.

=== Northern Ireland ===
Police Service of Northern Ireland

County and borough based police forces were not formed in Ireland as they were in Great Britain, with instead a single Royal Irish Constabulary covering most of Ireland (the exceptions being the Dublin Metropolitan Police, which was responsible for policing in Dublin, and the Londonderry Borough Police and Belfast Town Police, both replaced by the RIC in the late Victorian period). The Royal Ulster Constabulary was formed in 1922 after the establishment of the Irish Free State, and served until the reforms of the police under the terms established initially by the Good Friday Agreement of 1998 undertaken by the Patten Commission, which led to dissolution of the RUC in 2001. The Police (Northern Ireland) Act 2000 sets out the basis for the organisation and function of the police force in the province. Until 2010, police powers were not transferred to the devolved Northern Ireland Executive, unlike Scotland, instead remaining with the Northern Ireland Office. However, in January 2010 agreement was reached between the two largest parties in the Assembly, the DUP and Sinn Féin, over a course that would see them assume responsibility for policing and justice from April.

As of April 2007 police numbers in Northern Ireland were:

- Police officers: 7,216
- Full-time reserve police officers: 335
- Part-time police officers: 684
- Other staff: 2,265

Police in Northern Ireland do not employ Police Community Support Officers

=== National Collaborative Units ===
==== Bodies hosted by the National Police Chiefs' Council (NPCC) ====
- National Wildlife Crime Unit – A police unit run by the NPCC that gathers intelligence on wildlife crime and provides analytical and investigative support to law enforcement agencies across the United Kingdom.
- National Counter Terrorism Security Office – A police unit run by the NPCC, which advises the British government on its counter terrorism strategy.
- National Vehicle Crime Intelligence Service – A police unit run by the NPCC, tasked with combating organised vehicle crime and the use of vehicles in crime.

==== Bodies hosted by territorial police forces ====
- National Domestic Extremism and Disorder Intelligence Unit – A police unit that is part of the Metropolitan Police Service Specialist Operations Directorate, tasked with coordinating police response to domestic extremism across the United Kingdom.
- Protection Command – A police unit that is part of the Metropolitan Police Service Specialist Operations Directorate, responsible for providing protective security to the government/diplomatic community and the Royal Family within the United Kingdom.
- National Fraud Intelligence Bureau – A police unit hosted by the City of London Police, tasked with combating economic crime throughout the United Kingdom.
- National Ballistics Intelligence Service (Great Britain) – A police unit hosted by West Midlands Police, tasked with gathering and disseminating fast time intelligence on the criminal use of firearms across Great Britain.
- National Police Air Service (England and Wales) – A police aviation service hosted by West Yorkshire Police, that provides centralised air support to all police forces in England and Wales.

== Special police forces ==
Three agencies are defined in legislation as "special police forces". As these forces are responsible to specific areas of infrastructure, they answer to the government department responsible for the area they police. All three forces voluntarily submit to inspections by His Majesty's Inspectorate of Constabulary and Fire & Rescue Services:

- Ministry of Defence Police – tasked with providing armed security, uniformed policing, and investigative services to Ministry of Defence installations throughout the United Kingdom.
- Civil Nuclear Constabulary – responsible for providing law enforcement and security at or within 5 km (3.1 mi) of any relevant nuclear site and for nuclear materials in transit within the United Kingdom.
- British Transport Police – responsible for providing law enforcement at certain railways and light-rail systems in Great Britain.

The Anti-terrorism, Crime and Security Act 2001 gave the British Transport Police and Ministry of Defence Police a limited, conditional authority to act outside of their primary jurisdiction, if the situation requires urgent police action and the local force are not readily available, or if they believe there is risk to life or limb, or where they are assisting the local force.

== Non-police force law enforcement ==
=== Uniformed and/or investigative ===
- National Crime Agency (NCA) – An agency that leads UK-wide activities to combat high-level crime such as organised crime. In addition, the NCA acts as the UK point of contact for foreign law enforcement agencies. It replaced the Serious Organised Crime Agency in 2013. The NCA has been compared to the Federal Bureau of Investigation (FBI) in the United States.
- Fair Work Agency (FWA) – an investigative agency for labour exploitation, also working with other agencies on organised crime connected with labour abuse and exploitation. FWA officers have powers under the Police and Criminal Evidence Act 1984 akin to those of police constables in relation to their narrow remit.
- His Majesty's Revenue and Customs (HMRC) – employs customs officers with law enforcement powers to carry out uniformed (e.g. combatting misuse of red diesel) and investigative work (in the Criminal Investigation Branch). They exercise the powers granted under the Customs Management Acts and the Police and Criminal Evidence Act 1984, including arrest, search and detention of people and goods.
- Border Force (BF) – a law enforcement command within the Home Office, responsible for frontline border control operations at air, sea and rail ports. Border Force officers are dual-warranted as immigration and customs officers. They have powers of arrest and detention under the Immigration Act 1971 and Borders, Citizenship and Immigration Act 2009. Designated immigration officers have additional powers from the UK Borders Act 2007, allowing them to arrest a person suspected of non-border offences and detain for a certain period until a police constable can take custody of the person.
- Immigration Enforcement (IE) – a law enforcement command within the Home Office, responsible for preventing abuse, tracking immigration offenders and increasing compliance with immigration law across the UK.
- Fisheries Enforcement Officers (also known as water bailiffs) appointed by the Environment Agency in England and Natural Resources Wales in Wales, have the powers of a constable in relation to the Salmon and Freshwater Fisheries Act 1975. Officers in Scotland are appointed by the District Salmon Fishery Boards, to enforce the Salmon and Freshwater Fisheries (Consolidation) (Scotland) Act 2003. FEOs protect fish and combat related crime (e.g. poaching).
- His Majesty's Prison Service (HMPS) is responsible for managing most prisons in England and Wales. Its Prison Officers, whilst acting as such, have "all the powers, authority, protection and privileges of a constable". Prisons in Northern Ireland and Scotland are managed by the Northern Ireland Prison Service and Scottish Prison Service, respectively.
- Department for Work & Pensions's Economic, Serious and Organised Crime team investigates sophisticated, large-scale fraud within the UK welfare system, targeting organized crime groups. Public Authorities (Fraud, Error and Recovery) Act 2025 granting investigators the power of arrest, search, and seizure.

=== Bodies with limited executive powers ===
- Driver and Vehicle Standards Agency (Great Britain)
- Driver and Vehicle Agency (Northern Ireland)
- The Independent Office for Police Conduct (England and Wales) investigates complaints against police officers and staff of the police forces in England and Wales, and staff of HM Revenue and Customs, the National Crime Agency in England and Wales, the Border Force and officers from the Gangmasters and Labour Abuse Authority. Certain investigators of the IOPC, for the purposes of the carrying out of an investigation and all purposes connected with it, have all the powers and privileges of constables throughout England and Wales and the territorial waters.

=== Bodies with solely investigatory powers ===
The use of investigatory powers is controlled by the Regulation of Investigatory Powers Act 2000. Up to 792 public authorities have powers that are restricted by RIPA.

- Homeland Security Group
- Security Service
- Serious Fraud Office (England, Wales and Northern Ireland)

== Miscellaneous police forces ==
These police forces generally come under the control of a local authority, public trusts or even private companies; examples include some ports police and the Mersey Tunnels Police. They could have been established by individual acts of Parliament or under common law powers. Jurisdiction is generally limited to the relevant area of private property alone and in some cases (e.g. docks and harbours) the surrounding area. This, together with the small size of the police forces, means they are often reliant on the territorial force for the area under whose jurisdiction they fall to assist with any serious matter. The statutory responsibility for law and order sits with the territorial police forces even if there is a specialist police force in the locality. These police forces do not have independent police authorities and their founding statutes (if any) do not generally prescribe their structure and formation.

=== Ports police ===
There are two types of port police in the United Kingdom – most are sworn in under the 1847 act, but a few have acts specific to their port.

Ports police operating under the Harbours, Docks, and Piers Clauses Act 1847

For every port/harbour, an individual act of Parliament (or, more recently, a Harbour (Revision) Order) can incorporate parts of the Harbours, Docks, and Piers Clauses Act 1847 (HDPCA) and apply them to that specific port/harbour. Officers of port police forces are sworn in as "special constables" under section 79 of the 1847 Act, as incorporated by the individual local Act. As a result, officers have the full powers of a constable on any land owned by the harbour, dock, or port and at any place within one mile of any owned land.

The Marine Navigation Act 2013 has potentially enabled ports constables in England & Wales to act as constables beyond this one mile limit, in relation to policing purposes connected with the port only, in a police area where consent has been obtained from the relevant chief constable. This act does not however give general police powers to ports constables beyond their core jurisdiction as set out in the 1847 act, merely in relation to policing purposes connected to the port as set out in the Act. As of 2014, three ports police forces (Dover, Teesport and Bristol) have sought and received consent from the local chief constable, with a fourth (Liverpool) in the process of applying for it. This has enabled these three ports forces to act as constables, in relation to policing purposes connected to the port, throughout the police area in which they are geographically located. There are 224 constables sworn in under the 1847 act. Serious or major incidents or crime generally become the responsibility of the local territorial police force.

- Belfast Harbour Police – Belfast Harbour, Belfast: HDPCA incorporated by section 5 of the Belfast Harbour Act 1847.
- Port of Bristol Police – Port of Bristol, which includes Avonmouth Docks and Royal Portbury Dock
- Port of Felixstowe Police – Port of Felixstowe, Suffolk: HDPCA incorporated by section 3(1)(e) of the Felixstowe Dock and Railway Act 1956.
- Port of Portland Police – Portland Harbour, Isle of Portland: HDPCA incorporated by section 3 of the Portland Harbour Revision Order 1997.
- Falmouth Docks Police – Falmouth Docks, Falmouth, Cornwall: HDPCA incorporated by section 3 of the Falmouth Docks Act 1959 (7 & 8 Eliz. 2. c. xl).
- Port of Dover Police – Port of Dover, Dover: HDPCA incorporated by section 3 of the Dover Harbour Consolidation Act 1954, and incorporation amended by part 4 of the Dover Harbour Revision Order 2006. Given the large amount of property owned by the port, their jurisdiction effectively extends to all of Dover and now throughout Kent (in relation to port policing matters only) in order to be able to take arrested persons to custody suites.

Other ports police

- Port of Liverpool Police – Port of Liverpool, Liverpool: current authority derives from article 3 of the Mersey Docks and Harbour (Police) Order 1975. Port of Liverpool police officers are Crown police officers and not special constables.
- Port of Tilbury Police (formerly the Port of London Authority Police) – Port of Tilbury, Essex: current authority derives from section 154 of the Port of London Act 1968
- Tees and Hartlepool Port Authority Harbour Police – Tees and Hartlepool: current authority derives from section 103 of the Tees and Hartlepool Port Authority Act 1966
- A large, new port on the Thames Estuary (and within the Port of London area) called "London Gateway", the owners have the authority to create their own police force for the port. The legislation also incorporates section 79 of the 1847 act.

=== Parks police ===
==== Parks not controlled by local authorities ====
These small constabularies are responsible for policing specific land and parks. A council owned park, whilst considered a public place when open, is in fact private property and Home Office forces would only have a responsibility to respond to incidents, rather than to patrol. Officers of these forces have the powers of a constable within their limited jurisdiction. They are not constables as dealt with in the general Police Acts.

- Epping Forest Keepers
  Current powers derive from regulations made under Epping Forest Act 1878
- Kew Constabulary (formerly Royal Botanic Gardens Constabulary)
  Constables of this force have full police powers whilst on land belonging to the Royal Botanical Gardens as per the Parks Regulation Act 1872 as amended by section 3 (a) of the Parks Regulation (Amendment) Act 1974.

The Parks Regulation Act 1872 and Ministry of Housing and Local Government Provisional Order Confirmation (Greater London Parks and Open Spaces) Act 1967 provides for the attestation of parks constables.

==== Parks controlled by local authorities ====
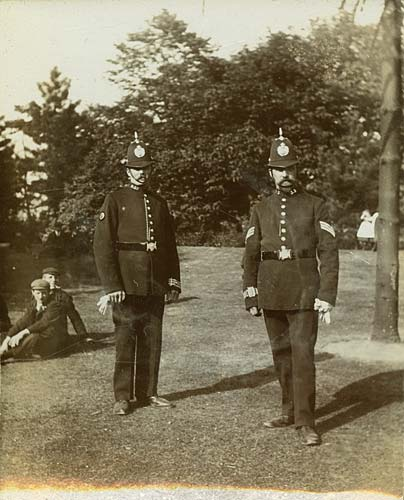
A photograph of officers of the Birmingham Parks Police, taken between c. 1900 and 1910.

Over history, a number of local authorities outside London have maintained their own parks police forces, the most notable being Liverpool (Liverpool Parks Police) and Birmingham (Birmingham Parks Police). No local authority parks police forces currently exist outside London, although the legal powers for them to do so (granted by various local Acts of Parliament) survive in a limited number of cases.

There are some remnant organisations of the old Parks Constabularies/Parks Police, such as the Birmingham Parks Ranger Patrol.

In London, these constabularies are responsible for enforcing byelaws within the parks and open spaces of their respective local authorities. Members of the constabularies are sworn as constables under article 18 of the Greater London Parks and Open Spaces Order 1967. (Note: The 1967 order is scheduled to the Ministry of Housing and Local Government Provisional Order Confirmation (Greater London Parks and Open Spaces) Act 1967.) Members of the constabularies are constables only in relation to the enforcement of the parks byelaws (which, by definition, apply only in the parks).

- Royal Borough of Kensington and Chelsea Parks Police
- Hampstead Heath Constabulary (HHC), also appointed under section 16 of the Corporation of London (Open Spaces) Act 1878 with the full powers and privileges of police constables within their limited jurisdiction.
- Havering Parks Constabulary
- Wandsworth Parks and Events Police

Some of these constables have (or have had) a shared role as security staff for their own local authority's buildings and housing estates with appropriate changes of badges and/or uniform being made when changing to/from park duties.

=== Cathedral constables ===
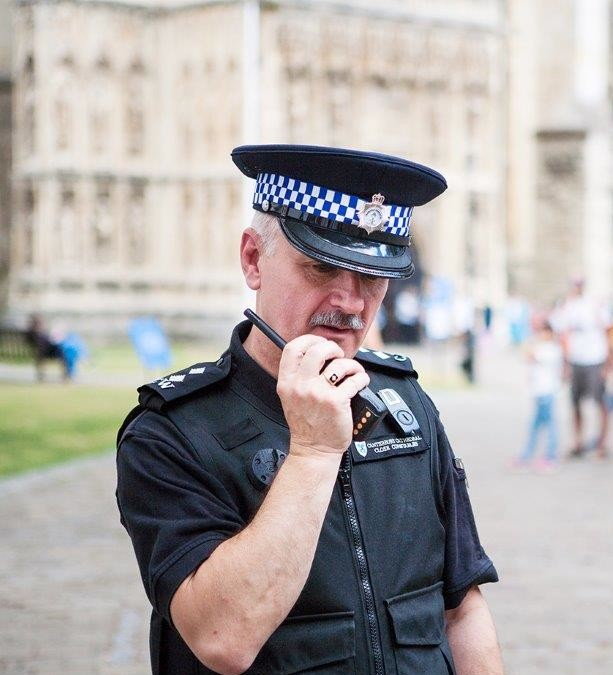
Canterbury Cathedral Constable (Inspector) in beat uniform

Cathedrals that have their own Constabularies consisting of attested constables that keep the peace at each Cathedral.

- York Minster Police
- Canterbury Cathedral Close Constables
- Liverpool Cathedral Constables

=== Market police ===
Traditionally, markets would employ constables to look after markets. Most no longer exist, or exist in a form without attested constables (see below).

- The City of London market constabularies are three small constabularies responsible for security at Billingsgate, New Spitalfields and Smithfield markets run by the City of London Corporation. However, unlike most other miscellaneous police organisations, the members are no longer attested as constables.

=== Other ===
- Belfast International Airport Constabulary – attested under article 19(3) of the Airports (Northern Ireland) Order 1994 as constables for the airport, which employs them.
- Cambridge University Constabulary – attested under the Universities Act 1825 as constables within the university precincts and up to four miles from them.
- Mersey Tunnels Police – attested under section 105 of the County of Merseyside Act 1980 (c. x) as constables within a jurisdiction of the tunnels and all approach roads.

== Military and service police ==
=== Service (Military) Police ===
Each branch of the military has its own service police, though their powers are identical and reciprocal across all three services. The service police is made up of the:

- Royal Navy Police
- Royal Marines Police
- Royal Military Police
- Royal Air Force Police

In the UK, the service police exercise jurisdiction over those serving in the military in any capacity and those civilians subject to service discipline as defined by the Armed Forces Act 2006. They are not 'constables' and do not have any policing powers in relation to the general public in normal circumstances. In British Forces Germany, under the Status Of Forces Act, military police have jurisdiction over British Forces personnel, their families, MOD contractors, and NAAFI staff.

Service Police are Police and Criminal Evidence Act (PACE) trained and all investigations are PACE compliant. They make regular use of civilian police facilities often conducting joint investigations where necessary. The Service Police are able to investigate all crime within their jurisdiction, up to and including Murder, however within the UK, offences of murder and sudden deaths are passed to the local police force as per national jurisdiction agreements.

Whilst operating in conflict zones, the military police will conduct the full range of policing including murder investigations as evidenced by the Sgt Blackman investigation.

=== Defence security organisations ===
Other agencies exist to provide security to MOD and military bases in the UK and abroad.

- Northern Ireland Security Guard Service (NISGS) – Civilian Security Officers belonging to the Northern Ireland Security Guard Service are attested as Special Constables. They are armed, as is customary in Northern Ireland for security forces.
- Germany Guard Service (GGS) – MOD uniformed civilian security officers providing armed security and access control to British Forces Germany units
- Military Provost Guard Service (MPGS) – part of the Army Adjutant General's Corps, tasked with armed security at military establishments in mainland UK.
- Ministry of Defence Guard Service (MGS) – civilian unarmed security officers providing security and access control at MOD and some military establishments.

== Bodies with limited enforcement powers ==
There are also non-police (of any type) organisations who have been given certain powers to enforce rules, regulations and laws.

1. Under the community safety accreditation scheme (CSAS) and the similar railway safety accreditation scheme (RSAS), police forces in England and Wales have the power to grant limited powers to official persons (such as council wardens and private security staff), for example, the power to confiscate alcohol from under 18s.
2. Under the national railway byelaws, any 'authorised person' may ensure all persons on the railway are abiding by the byelaws. Generally, railway train operating companies (TOCs) leave this to dedicated enforcement officers. Sometimes these officers will have powers under the Railway safety accreditation scheme and as they are working for the railway, they also have powers under the railway byelaws.

Under the community safety accreditation scheme (CSAS), there are many different people involved, such as council staff, park rangers or private security staff that work for councils and local authorities and many different titles are used:

Community based

- Community protection officer
- Street marshal
- Street Wise marshal
- Community safety officer
- Patrol officer
- Park ranger
- Neighbourhood warden
- Hospital security guard
- Security officer
- Security guard
- Street warden
- Community warden
- Business warden
- Business improvement district ranger
- Street ranger
- Council officer
- Tri-service safety officer
- Taxi and private hire compliance officer

Railway based

(Officers with powers under both national byelaws and RSAS)

- Protection officer
- Rail neighbourhood officer

== Crown Dependencies ==
The Crown Dependencies (Note: French: Dépendances de la Couronne; Manx: Croghaneyn-crooin; Jèrriais: Dépendances d'la Couronne) are three offshore island territories that are self-governing possessions of the British Crown. Although not sovereign British territory, their administration is similar to the British Overseas Territories.

=== Isle of Man ===
- The Isle of Man Constabulary (Meoiryn-Shee Ellan Vannin) is the police service of the Isle of Man.
- The Isle of Man Prison and Probation Service runs the Isle of Man Prison, the only prison on the island.
- Isle of Man Customs and Excise Division is tasked with customs duties on the island.

Defunct

- The Isle of Man Airport Police policed the main Isle of Man Airport (in Ronaldsway), with officers who were "warranted constables" under the Isle of Man Airports and Civil Aviation Act. Disbanded September 2019.

Flag	Logo	Service/Force Name	Location	Information
		Isle of Man Constabulary (Meoiryn-Shee Ellan Vannin)	Isle of Man	Civilian main police force for the Crown Dependency
Flag	Logo	Service/Force Name	Location	Information
		Isle of Man Customs and Excise Division	Isle of Man	Administers all Customs and Excise duties
Flag	Logo	Service/Force Name	Location	Information
		Isle of Man Prison and Probation Service	Isle of Man	Administers HM Prison and probation on the Isle

=== Bailiwick of Jersey ===
- The States of Jersey Police (Police d'États de Jersey) is the police service of Jersey. It was established in its current form by the Police Force (Jersey) Law, 1974 and consists of around 240 officers.

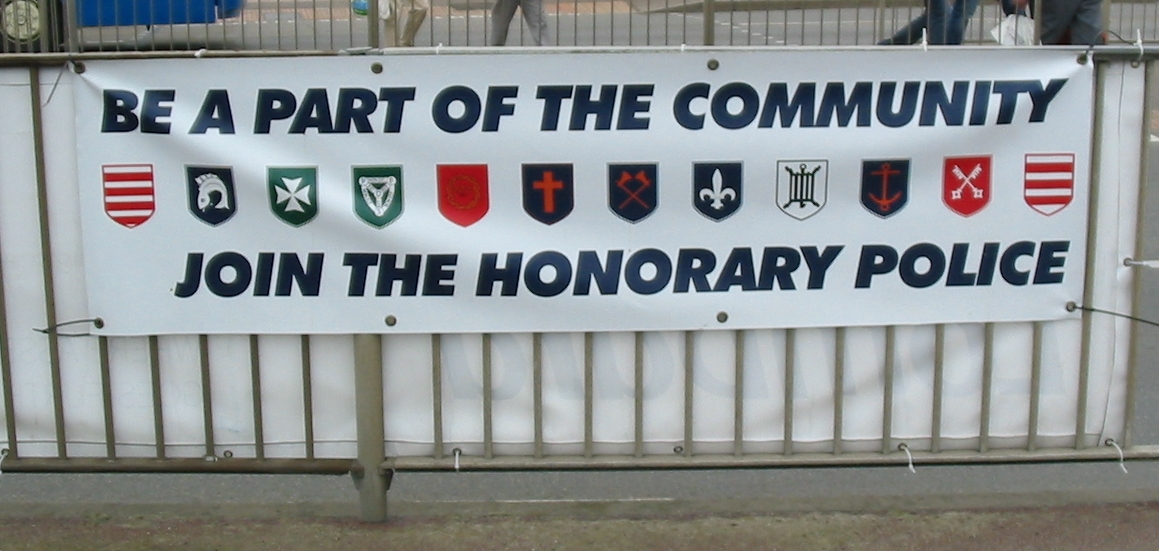
A recruiting banner for the Honorary Police showing the arms of each parish: (from left to right) Grouville, St Brelade, St John, Trinity, St Saviour, St Ouen, St Helier, St Mary, St Lawrence, St Clement, St Peter, St Martin

- States of Jersey Customs and Immigration Service
- Honorary Police – There is an Honorary Police (French: Police Honorifique) force in each parish in Jersey. Honorary Police officers have, for centuries, been elected by parishioners to assist the connétable of the Parish to maintain law and order, and to this day the only person who may charge a person with an offence is the centenier of the parish in which the offence allegedly took place. Officers are elected as centeniers, vingteniers or constable's officers, each with various duties and responsibilities.
- Jersey Prison Service, responsible for running the HM Prison La Moye.

Flag	Logo	Service/Force Name	Location	Information
		States of Jersey Police (Police d'États de Jersey)	Jersey	Main civilian police force for the Crown Dependency
Flag	Logo	Service/Force Name	Location	Information
		States of Jersey Customs and Immigration Service	Jersey	Administers all Customs and Immigration duties
Flag	Logo	Service/Force Name	Location	Information
		Honorary Police (French: Police Honorifique)	Jersey	maintain law and order in their parish
Flag	Logo	Service/Force Name	Location	Information
		Jersey Prison Service	HM Prison La Moye	run HM Prison

=== Bailiwick of Guernsey ===
- The States of Guernsey Police Service (États de Guernesey Service de police) is the local police force for the Crown dependency of Guernsey. In addition to providing police for the island of Guernsey itself, the Guernsey Police also provides detachments for the islands of Alderney, Herm and Sark.
- Guernsey Border Agency, responsible with policing cross border and financial crime, customs and immigration.
- Guernsey Prison Service, responsible for running HMP Guernsey, the main prison on the island.

Flag	Logo	Service/Force Name	Location	Information
Flag of Guernsey		States of Guernsey Police Service (États de Guernesey Service de police)	Guernsey	Main civilian police force for the Crown Dependency
Flag	Logo	Service/Force Name	Location	Information
Flag of Guernsey		Guernsey Border Agency	Guernsey	Administers all Customs and Immigration duties
Flag	Logo	Service/Force Name	Location	Information
Flag of Guernsey		Honorary Police (French: Police Honorifique)	Jersey	maintain law and order in their parish

== Overseas Territories ==
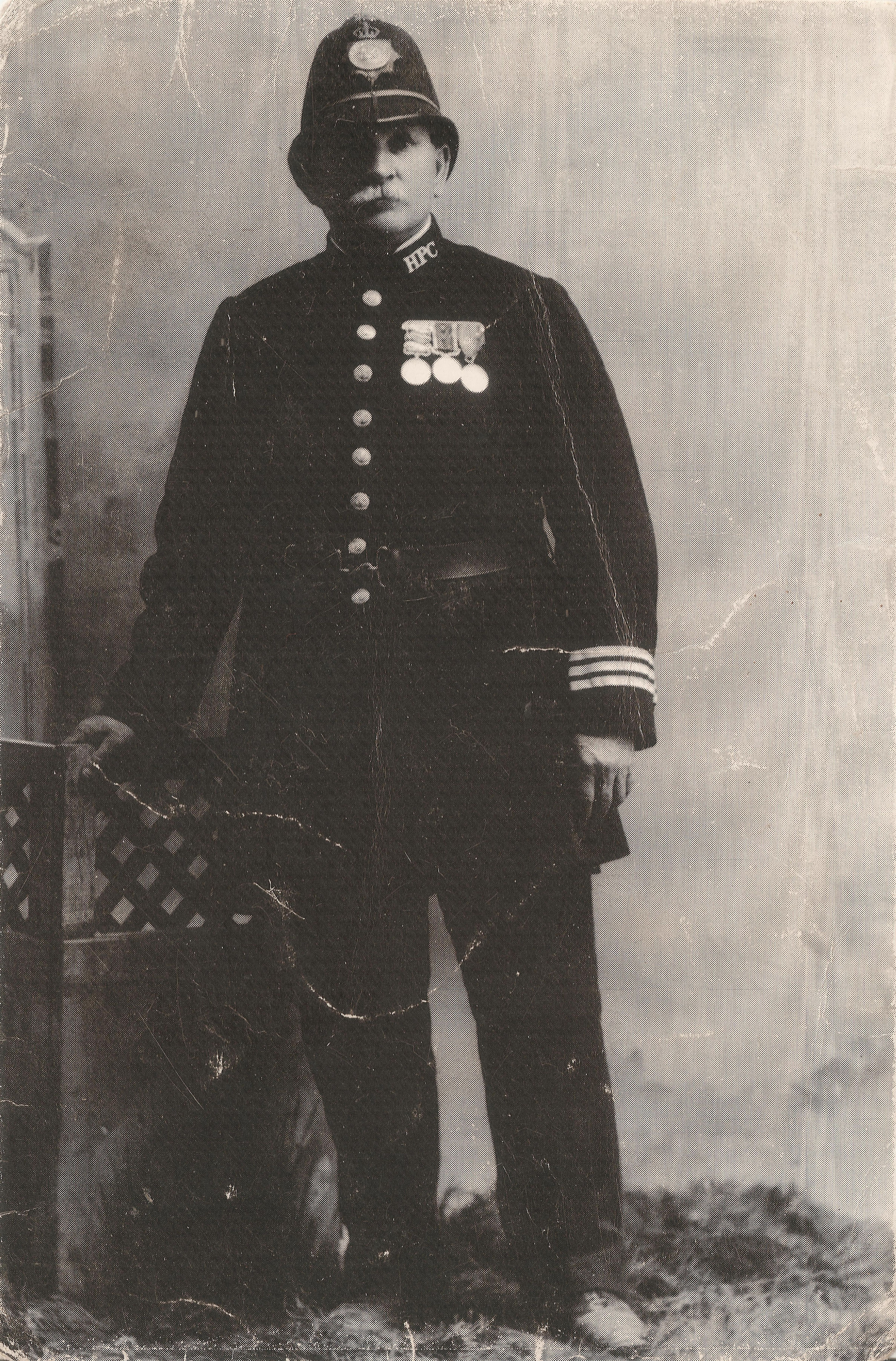
Police Sergeant Thomas James Powell of the Bermuda Police Force, c. 1890

The British Overseas Territories (BOTs) are British sovereign territory, mostly islands, within most of which most competencies (aspects of governance) are delegated to local administrations, but for which the government of the United Kingdom is ultimately responsible and retains responsibility for serious matters, such as defence and security, with police forces directly under the control of the governor.

Consequently, law enforcement in these territories closely mirrors the UK, with some influence from other nations. Some of these agencies are very old and were set up centuries ago.

=== Civil police ===
Almost all BOTs have a civil police force. Some forces may serve more than one island or territory. See below for details.

Name of territory	Flag of territory	Arms of territory	Civilian police force/service	Military or defence police	Location	Motto	Information
Sovereign Base Areas, Cyprus			Civilian Sovereign Base Areas Police (SBA Police)	Military Cyprus Joint Police Unit (CJPU) (includes RN Police, RMP and RAF Police)	Cyprus, Mediterranean Sea		Civilian defence police and British service police are responsible for policing the SBAs
Anguilla			Royal Anguilla Police Force (RAPF)		Caribbean, North Atlantic Ocean		
Bermuda			Bermuda Police Service (BPS) Airport Security Police of Bermuda	Regimental Police of the Royal Bermuda Regiment; Royal Naval Dockyard, Bermuda Police (defunct); Bermuda Garrison Police (defunct)	North Atlantic Ocean between Cape Hatteras, Cape Sable Island, the Caribbean, and the Azores	"Making Bermuda Safer"	
British Antarctic Territory			None	None	Antarctica	N/A	
British Indian Ocean Territory			British Indian Ocean Territory Police (BIOT Police) (service police)	All BIOT Police are serving military police of the British Armed Forces	Indian Ocean		BIOT police are serving military police NCOs and officers from the British Armed Forces
British Virgin Islands			Royal Virgin Islands Police Force (RVIPF)	None	Caribbean, North Atlantic Ocean	"Service with courage, knowledge and integrity"	
Cayman Islands			Royal Cayman Islands Police Service (RCIP)	None	Caribbean		
Falkland Islands			Royal Falkland Islands Police (RFIP)	Joint Service Police & Security Unit (JSPSU) of British Forces South Atlantic	South Atlantic Ocean	"Integrity, Fairness and Respect"	JSPSU on the island are sworn in as RFIP reserve constables, so that they have full civil police powers during their tour of duty.
Gibraltar			Royal Gibraltar Police (RGP)	Gibraltar Defence Police (GDP), Joint Provost and Security Unit (JPSU) (military police)	Iberian Peninsula, Continental Europe	"Delivering a Safer Gibraltar through Excellence in Policing" (RGP)	
Montserrat			Royal Montserrat Police Service (RMPS)	None	Caribbean, North Atlantic Ocean		
Pitcairn Islands			see Law enforcement in the Pitcairn Islands (seconded officers from New Zealand Police)	None	Pacific Ocean		Serious sexual abuse history. New Zealand police and prison officers carry out services on the Island(s).
Saint Helena, Ascension and Tristan da Cunha			Royal Saint Helena Police Service (RSHPS) police all three islands	None	South Atlantic Ocean	"Protecting and serving our community" (SHPS)	
South Georgia and the South Sandwich Islands			See Information box	JSPSU of British Forces South Atlantic would carry out any MP functions needed	South Atlantic Ocean		Reserve police officers. Chief of Police is the Chief of Royal Falkland Islands Police (RFIP), any full-time officer needed is also RFIP
Turks and Caicos Islands			Royal Turks and Caicos Islands Police Force (RTCIPF)	None	Lucayan Archipelago, North Atlantic Ocean, West Indies	"To make the Turks and Caicos Islands a safe and secure country in which to visit, invest, work, and live"	One of the oldest forces – founded in 1799

==== List ====
- Bermuda Police Service
- Bermuda Airport Security Police
- Royal Anguilla Police Force
- Pitcairn Islands Police
- Royal Cayman Islands Police Service
- Royal Falkland Islands Police
- Royal Montserrat Police Force
- Royal Virgin Islands Police Force
- Royal Saint Helena Police Service
- Royal Gibraltar Police
- Royal Turks and Caicos Islands Police Force

=== Ministry of Defence overseas police ===
- Sovereign Base Areas Police (Cyprus) – polices the SBA areas in Cyprus
- Gibraltar Defence Police – polices all defence areas and people in Gibraltar

=== Overseas service (military) police ===
- British Indian Ocean Territory Police – military police that act as the police for BIOT
- Cyprus Joint Police Unit – tri-service military police
- Falkland Islands Joint Service Police Security Unit – tri-service military police (JSPSU)
- Gibraltar Joint Provost and Security Unit – tri-service military police (JPSU)

=== Prison service and corrections ===
- His Majesty's Prison Service Turks and Caicos
- Bermuda Department of Corrections
- His Majesty's Prison Gibraltar
- His Majesty's Prison and Probation Service, Falkland Islands
- His Majesty's Virgin Islands Prison Service (HMVIP)
- His Majesty's Cayman Islands Prison Service
- His Majesty's Prison Anguilla
- His Majesty's Prison Montserrat

=== Customs, immigration and border ===
- His Majesty's Customs (Gibraltar)
- Border and Coastguard Agency (Gibraltar)
- Turks & Caicos Customs Department
- Turks and Caicos Immigration Department
- His Majesty's Customs, British Virgin Islands
- His Majesty's Customs and Excise (St Helena)
- His Majesty's Customs Bermuda
- Cayman Islands Customs and Border Control (CBC)

N.B. "His Majesty's" is often shortened to HM.

== Overseas law enforcement in the UK ==
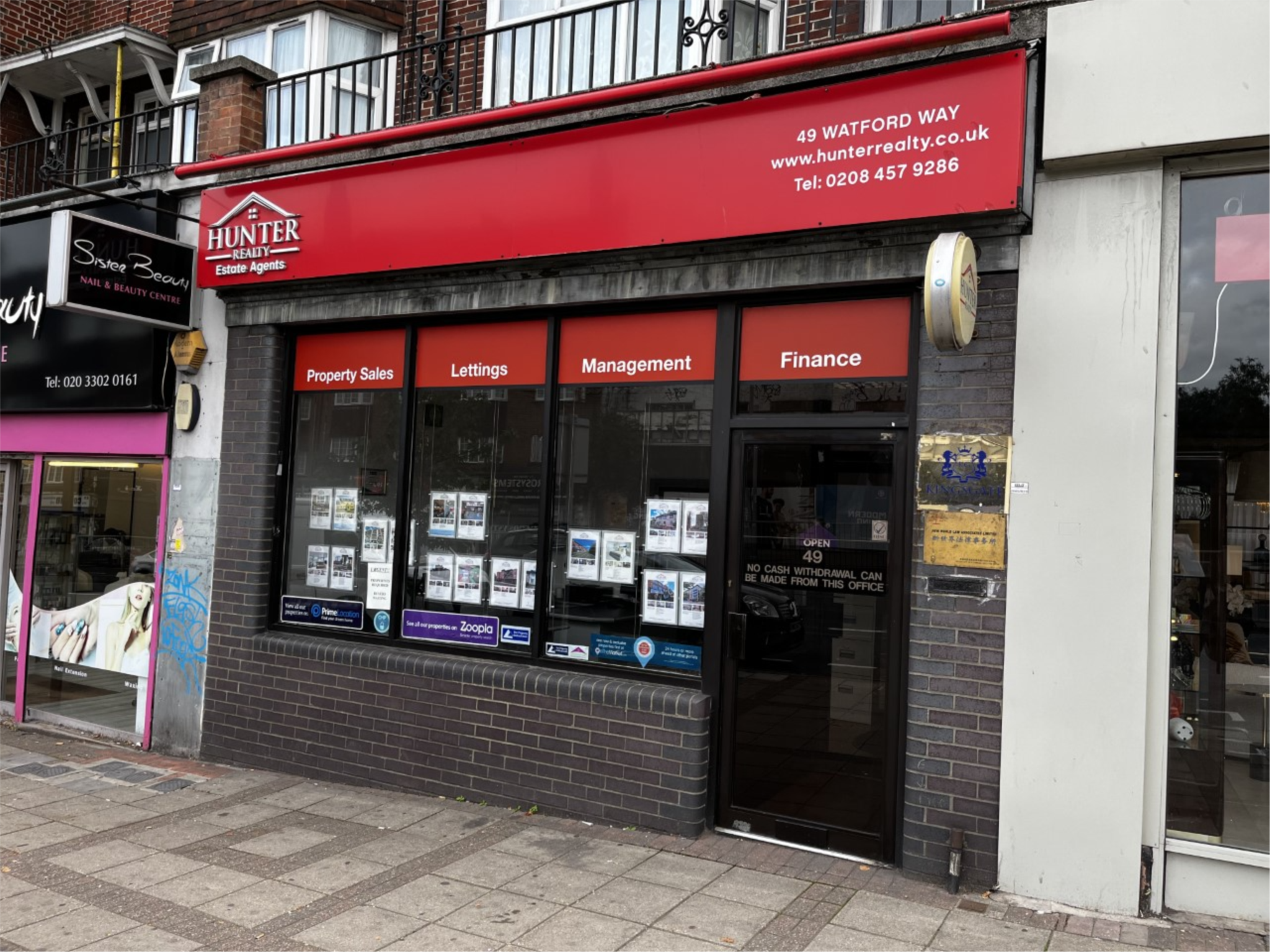
Chinese police overseas service station, Hendon, London

There are certain instances where police forces of other nations operate in a limited degree in the United Kingdom:

- Garda Síochána – Under an agreement between the British Government and the Irish Government and under the United Nations Convention on the Law of the Sea, the Garda Síochána and the Radiological Protection Institute of Ireland are allowed to inspect the Sellafield nuclear facility in Cumbria.
- Police aux Frontières – As part of the Channel Tunnel agreement between the British and French governments, the Police aux Frontières maintains a presence at St. Pancras International, Ebbsfleet International and Ashford International railway stations and on Eurostar trains. The British Transport Police have a reciprocal arrangement at the Gare du Nord in Paris. The Police aux Frontieres also maintain a presence at passport control at the Eurotunnel terminal in Folkestone and at Dover port, whilst Kent Police maintains a presence at Coquelles on the French side of the tunnel. Similar arrangements allow the Border Force to operate juxtaposed controls in France and Belgium.
- Military police of visiting forces while present within the terms of the Visiting Forces Act 1952.
- Chinese service stations in Croydon, Hendon and Glasgow are not legally recognised or permitted by the UK Government to undertake any form of Law Enforcement activities.

== See also ==
- Battenburg markings
- Sillitoe tartan
- Jam sandwich (slang)
- List of defunct law enforcement agencies in the United Kingdom
- List of law enforcement agencies in England and Wales
- List of law enforcement agencies in Northern Ireland
- List of law enforcement agencies in Scotland
- List of United Kingdom uniformed services
- Law enforcement in the United Kingdom
- Table of police forces in the United Kingdom
- Collar number
- Warrant card
- Royal Hong Kong Police Force
