= List of law enforcement agencies in England and Wales =

Map of England and Wales within the United Kingdom

This is a list of law enforcement agencies in England and Wales.

== National law enforcement ==
Police

- Ministry of Defence Police
- Civil Nuclear Constabulary
- British Transport Police

Bodies with police powers

- National Crime Agency

Bodies with limited executive powers

- Border Force
- Immigration Enforcement
- His Majesty's Revenue and Customs
- Driver and Vehicle Standards Agency
- Independent Police Complaints Commission

Bodies with solely investigatory powers

- Office for Security and Counter-Terrorism
- Security Service
- Serious Fraud Office

Bodies hosted by the Association of Chief Police Officers

- National Wildlife Crime Unit
- National Counter Terrorism Security Office
- National Vehicle Crime Intelligence Service

Bodies hosted by territorial police forces

- National Domestic Extremism and Disorder Intelligence Unit
- Protection Command
- National Fraud Intelligence Bureau
- National Ballistics Intelligence Service
- National Police Air Service

== Subnational law enforcement ==
Regional counter terrorism units

- South East Counter Terrorism Unit
- South West Counter Terrorism Unit
- Metropolitan Police Service Counter Terrorism Command
- East Counter Terrorism Intelligence Unit
- East Midlands Counter Terrorism Intelligence Unit
- West Midlands Counter Terrorism Unit
- Welsh Extremism and Counter Terrorism Unit
- North West Counter Terrorism Unit
- North East Counter Terrorism Unit

Regional organised crime units

- South East Region Organised Crime Unit
- South West Region Organised Crime Unit
- Metropolitan Police Service Specialist, Organised and Economic Crime Command
- Eastern Region Special Operations Unit
- East Midlands Special Operations Unit
- West Midland Regional Organised Crime Unit
- Southern Wales Regional Organised Crime Unit
- North West Regional Organised Crime Unit
- North East Region Special Operations Unit

Territorial police forces

- Avon and Somerset Constabulary
- Bedfordshire Police
- Cambridgeshire Constabulary
- Cheshire Constabulary
- City of London Police
- Cleveland Police
- Cumbria Constabulary
- Derbyshire Constabulary
- Devon and Cornwall Police
- Dorset Police
- Durham Constabulary
- Dyfed-Powys Police
- Essex Police
- Gloucestershire Constabulary
- Greater Manchester Police
- Gwent Police
- Hampshire Constabulary
- Hertfordshire Constabulary
- Humberside Police
- Kent Police
- Lancashire Constabulary
- Leicestershire Constabulary
- Lincolnshire Police
- Merseyside Police
- Metropolitan Police
- Norfolk Constabulary
- Northamptonshire Police
- Northumbria Police
- North Wales Police
- North Yorkshire Police
- Nottinghamshire Police
- South Wales Police
- South Yorkshire Police
- Staffordshire Police
- Suffolk Constabulary
- Surrey Police
- Sussex Police
- Thames Valley Police
- Warwickshire Police
- West Mercia Police
- West Midlands Police
- West Yorkshire Police
- Wiltshire Police

Ports police

- Port of Bristol Police
- Port of Felixstowe Police
- Port of Portland Police
- Falmouth Docks Police
- Port of Dover Police
- Port of Liverpool Police
- Port of Tilbury Police
- Tees and Hartlepool Port Authority Harbour Police

Parks police

- Epping Forest Keepers
- Kew Constabulary
- Parks Police Service
- Hampstead Heath Constabulary
- Hillingdon Parks Patrol Service

Other

- Cambridge University Constabulary
- Mersey Tunnels Police
- Church of England cathedral constables
- Royal Parks Constabulary, closed down in 2000.
- Marine and Fisheries Division, Wales

== See also ==
- List of law enforcement agencies in the United Kingdom, Crown Dependencies and British Overseas Territories
- List of law enforcement agencies in Northern Ireland
- List of law enforcement agencies in Scotland
