= List of law enforcement agencies in Scotland =

Map of Scotland within the United Kingdom

This is a list of law enforcement agencies in Scotland.

Police

- Police Scotland
- British Transport Police
- Ministry of Defence Police
- Civil Nuclear Constabulary

Bodies with police powers

- National Crime Agency

Bodies with limited executive powers

- Border Force
- Immigration Enforcement
- His Majesty's Revenue and Customs
- Driver and Vehicle Standards Agency

Bodies with solely investigatory powers

- Office for Security and Counter-Terrorism
- Security Service

Bodies hosted by the Association of Chief Police Officers

- National Wildlife Crime Unit
- National Counter Terrorism Security Office
- National Vehicle Crime Intelligence Service

Bodies hosted by territorial police forces

- National Domestic Extremism and Disorder Intelligence Unit
- Protection Command
- National Fraud Intelligence Bureau
- National Ballistics Intelligence Service

Environmental regulation

- Scottish Environment Protection Agency

== See also ==
- List of law enforcement agencies in the United Kingdom, Crown Dependencies and British Overseas Territories
- List of law enforcement agencies in England and Wales
- List of law enforcement agencies in Northern Ireland
