= List of national border guard agencies =

This is the list of the Border Guard agencies in different countries. Such agencies may also be known as Border Patrol, Border Police, Border Troops, Frontier Guard or Frontier Police.

== Asia ==
=== Bangladesh ===
- Border Guard Bangladesh - Primary Border Security Force
- Bangladesh Coast Guard - Coastal Area Security Force
- Bangladesh Customs - Principal Customs Agency
- Department of Immigration and Passport
- Immigration Police

=== People's Republic of China ===
- General Administration of Customs - Primary customs and excise agency.
- Ministry of Public Security
  - National Immigration Administration - China Immigration Inspection (CII)
- People's Armed Police Border Defense Corps - Border patrol and control functions in remote regions.

=== Hong Kong ===
- Hong Kong Immigration Department
- Hong Kong Customs & Excise

=== India ===
- Border Security Force – 245,000 personnel on the Pakistan and Bangladesh Border
- Indo-Tibetan Border Police – 77,000 personnel on the Tibet (China) Border
- Assam Rifles – 50,000 personnel organised into 46 battalions, an internal security force with secondary duties along the eastern borders of Myanmar.
- Sashastra Seema Bal (SSB) – 82,000 personnel on the Bhutan and Nepal Borders
- Indian Coast Guard (ICG) – a specialized maritime force under India's Ministry of Defence dedicated to protecting the sea borders.

=== Indonesia ===
- Customs - oversee traffic of goods.
- Immigration - oversee traffic of people.
- Land Border : Border Patrol Task Force (Satuan Tugas Pengamanan Perbatasan abbreviated Satgas Pamtas), which consist of Infantry battalions from the Indonesian Army.
- Sea Border : Maritime Security Agency, Navy, Sea and Coast Guard, Maritime Police and Marine and Fisheries Resources Surveillance.

=== Iran ===
- Border Guard Command

=== Israel ===
- Israel Border Police

=== Kyrgyzstan ===
- State Border Guard Service (Kyrgyz Republic)

=== Macau Special Administrative Region ===
- Public Security Police Force

=== Malaysia ===
- Immigration Department of Malaysia
- Royal Malaysian Customs Department
- Malaysia Maritime Enforcement Agency
- Malaysian Armed Forces
- Royal Malaysia Police

=== Myanmar ===
- Border Guard Police
- Border Guard Forces
- Myanmar Coast Guard

=== Pakistan ===
- Pakistan Customs - oversee traffic of goods
- Frontier Corps
  - Frontier Corps Balochistan (North) on the central border with Afghanistan
  - Frontier Corps Balochistan (South) on the western border with Iran and the southwestern part of the border with Afghanistan
  - Frontier Corps Khyber Pakhtunkhwa (North) on the northwestern border with Afghanistan
  - Frontier Corps Khyber Pakhtunkhwa (South) on the central border with Afghanistan
- Gilgit-Baltistan Scouts on the northeastern border with China and part of the Line of Control with Indian Kashmir
- Pakistan Coast Guards - patrol force on the southern coast
- Pakistan Maritime Security Agency, a coast guard on the southern maritime border
- Pakistan Rangers
  - Punjab Rangers on the northeastern border with India
  - Sindh Rangers on the southeastern border with India.

=== Singapore ===
- Immigration and Checkpoints Authority
- Singapore Customs

=== South Korea ===
- Korea Immigration Service
- Korea Customs Service

=== Tajikistan ===
- Tajik Border Troops

=== Thailand ===
- Border Patrol Police
- Paramilitary Marine Regiment
- Thahan Phran

=== Republic of China ===
- National Immigration Agency of the Ministry of the Interior of Taiwan Political Authority - Immigration and border security
- Customs Administration of Ministry of Finance - handles customs

=== United Arab Emirates ===
- United Arab Emirates Coast Guard
- The Dubai Council for Border Crossing Points Security

=== Vietnam ===
- Vietnam Border Guard

== Europe ==
=== European Union ===
- Frontex

=== Albania ===
- Border and Migration Police

=== Andorra ===
- Police Corps of Andorra

=== Belarus ===
- State Border Committee of the Republic of Belarus
- Border Guard Service of Belarus

=== Bulgaria ===
- Bulgaria Border Police

=== Czech Republic ===
- Policie České republiky - Služba cizinecké policie

=== Croatia ===
- Croatian Border Police

=== Estonia ===
- Police and Border Guard Board (Estonian: Politsei- ja Piirivalveamet)

=== Finland ===
- Finnish Border Guard

=== France ===
- Directorate-General of Customs and Indirect Taxes
- Direction centrale de la police aux frontières
- Gendarmerie Nationale

=== Georgia ===
- Patrol Police Department (border control)
- Border Police of Georgia (border supervision)

=== Germany ===
- German Federal Police (formerly known as the Bundesgrenzschutz from 1951-2005)
- Bundeszollverwaltung (Federal Customs Service)

=== Ireland ===
- Garda Síochána
- Border Management Unit, Dept of Justice. BMU is responsible for Immigration at Dublin Airport

=== Italy ===
- Polizia di Stato
- Guardia di Finanza

=== Latvia ===
- State Border Guard

=== Liechtenstein ===
- Border and Customs Unit

=== Lithuania ===
- State Border Guard Service

=== Moldova ===
- Moldovan Border Police

=== Netherlands ===
- Royal Marechaussee

=== Norway ===
- Garnisonen i Sør-Varanger

=== Poland ===
- Border Guard (Poland) (Polish: Straż Graniczna)

=== Portugal ===
- Serviço de Estrangeiros e Fronteiras (Immigration and Border Service)
- Guarda Nacional Republicana (Unidade de Controlo Costeiro) (Border Surveillance)

=== Romania ===
- Romanian Border Police (Romanian: Poliţia de Frontieră)

=== Russia ===
- Border Guard Service of Russia (Russian: Пограничная служба России)

=== Spain ===
- National Police (border control, immigration, refuge and asylum, extradition and expulsion)
- Guardia Civil (border surveillance)

=== Sweden ===
- Swedish Police Authority

=== Switzerland ===
- Border Guard Corps (land borders and the airports of Basel (together with French Border police), Geneva and Lugano
- Cantonal police of Berne (at Bern-Belp airport)
- Cantonal police of Zurich (at Zurich airport)

=== Turkey ===
- Department of Foreigners, Borders and Asylum
- Border Gendarmerie
- Coast Guard Command
- General Directorate of Customs Protection

=== Ukraine ===
- State Border Guard Service of Ukraine (Ukrainian: Державна Прикордонна Служба України)

=== United Kingdom ===
- Border Force

==== Guernsey ====
- Guernsey Border Agency

==== Jersey ====
- Customs and Immigration Service

== North America ==
=== Canada ===
- Canada Border Services Agency

=== Mexico ===
- Instituto Nacional de Migración

=== United States ===
- U.S. Customs and Border Protection
  - U.S. Border Patrol

== Oceania ==
=== Australia ===
- Australian Border Force

=== New Zealand ===
- Immigration New Zealand
- New Zealand Customs Service

== South America ==
=== Colombia ===
- Migración Colombia

== Defunct agencies ==
=== East Germany ===
- Grenztruppen der DDR

=== Nazi Germany ===
- Zollgrenzschutz

=== Fascist Italy ===
- Guardia alla Frontiera

=== Soviet Union ===
- Soviet Border Troops

=== Austria-Hungary ===
- Grenz Infantry
