= Common Travel Area =

Open-borders area between the United Kingdom and Ireland

Common Travel Area Comhlimistéar Taistil
- Open borders area
- Established: 1923
- Members: List: United Kingdom; Ireland; Guernsey; Isle of Man; Jersey

Area
  - covered: 315,134 km^{2} (121,673.9 sq mi)

Population
  - covered: 73,061,814

The Common Travel Area (CTA; Irish: Comhlimistéar Taistil, Welsh: Ardal Deithio Gyffredin) is an open borders area comprising the United Kingdom, Ireland, the Isle of Man and the Channel Islands (Guernsey and Jersey). The British Overseas Territories are not included. Governed by non-binding agreements, (Note: The CTA is however referred to in legislation, such as the UK's Immigration Act 1971 (c. 77).) the CTA maintains minimal border controls, allowing easy passage for British and Irish citizens with limited identity documentation, albeit with some exceptions. Sustaining the CTA requires cooperation between British and Irish immigration authorities.

In 2014, the British and Irish governments initiated a trial programme to recognise each other's visas for travel within the CTA. As of August 2022, this programme extends to Chinese and Indian nationals, albeit with restrictions on certain visa categories. Nationals of other countries and holders of non-qualifying visas must obtain separate visas for both countries and are not eligible for transit visa exceptions if travelling through the United Kingdom to Ireland.

Since 1997, the Irish government has implemented systematic identity checks on air travellers arriving from the United Kingdom and selective checks on sea travellers, with occasional checks at land borders.

== History ==
=== 1923 agreement ===
The Irish Free State seceded from the United Kingdom of Great Britain and Ireland in December 1922, at a time when systematic passport and immigration controls were becoming standard at international frontiers. Although the British had imposed entry controls in the past – notably during the French Revolution – the imposition of such controls in the 20th century dated from the Aliens Act 1905 (5 Edw. 7. c. 13), before which there was a system of registration for arriving foreigners.

Before the creation of the Irish Free State, British immigration law applied in Ireland as part of the United Kingdom. With the imminent prospect of the secession of most of Ireland from the United Kingdom in 1922, the British Home Office was disinclined to impose passport and immigration controls between the Irish Free State and Northern Ireland, which would have meant patrolling a porous and meandering 499 km (310 mi) long land border. If, however, the pre-1922 situation were to be continued, the new Irish immigration authorities would have to continue to enforce British immigration policy after independence. The Department of Home Affairs in the newly established Irish Free State was found to be receptive to continuing with the status quo and an informal agreement to this effect was reached in February 1923: each side would enforce the other's immigration decisions and the Irish authorities would be provided with a copy of the UK's suspect-codex (or 'Black Book') of any personae non gratae in the United Kingdom.

The agreement was provided for in British law by deeming the Irish Free State, which was a dominion, to be part of the United Kingdom for the purposes of immigration law. It was fully implemented in 1925 when legislation passed in both states provided for the recognition of the other's landing conditions for foreigners. This may be considered to have been the high point of the CTA – although it was not called that at the time – as it almost amounted to a common immigration area. A foreigner who had been admitted to one state could, unless his or her admission had been conditional upon not entering the other state, travel to the other with only minimal bureaucratic requirements.

The CTA was suspended on the outbreak of the Second World War in September 1939, and travel restrictions were introduced between the islands of Great Britain and Ireland. This meant that travel restrictions even applied to people travelling within the UK if they were travelling from Northern Ireland to elsewhere in the UK.

=== 1952 agreement ===
After the war, the Irish re-instated their previous provisions allowing free movement, but the British declined to do so pending the agreement of a "similar immigration policy" in both states. Consequently, the British maintained immigration controls between the islands of Ireland and Great Britain until 1952, to the consternation of Northern Ireland's Unionist population. In 1949 The Republic of Ireland Act abolished the last remaining functions of the British monarch from Irish law, which resulted in Ireland leaving the Commonwealth of Nations as it had become a republic.

No agreement on a similar immigration policy was publicised at the time, but a year after the Irish Minister for Justice referred to the lifting of immigration controls between the two islands as "a matter for the British themselves", the British began referring to the CTA in legislation for the first time. The content of the agreement is provided for in relevant immigration law.

The CTA has meant that Ireland has been required to follow changes in British immigration policy. The Commonwealth Immigrants Act 1962 imposed immigration controls between the United Kingdom and Commonwealth countries. In Ireland, the Aliens Order 1962 replaced the state's previous provision exempting all British subjects from immigration control with one exempting only those born in the United Kingdom. The scope of the Irish provision was thus more restrictive than the British legislation as it excluded from immigration control only those British citizens born in the United Kingdom, and imposed immigration controls on those born outside the UK. The latter group would have included individuals who were British citizens by descent or by birth in a British colony. This discrepancy between the UK's and Ireland's definition of a British citizen was not resolved until 1999 by an order which exempted all (and only) British citizens from immigration control.

=== 2008 proposal ===
In July 2008, the UK Border Agency (the predecessor of UK Visas and Immigration) published a consultation paper on the CTA that envisaged the imposition of immigration controls for non-CTA nationals, and new measures for identity checks of CTA nationals, as well as an advance passenger information system, on all air and sea crossings between the islands of Ireland and Great Britain.

While passport controls were proposed to be applied to travellers between Great Britain and the Republic of Ireland, the nature of possible identity controls between Great Britain and Northern Ireland was not clear. This led to controversy because Northern Ireland is part of the United Kingdom, and a prominent Unionist described the proposed arrangements as "intolerable and preposterous". The nature of identity checks between Northern Ireland and Great Britain was characterised by the British government as follows:

Section 14 of the Police and Justice Act 2006 introduced a new power that will allow the police to capture passenger, crew and service information on air and sea journeys within the United Kingdom. ... It is expected that this police power will only apply to air and sea routes between Great Britain and Northern Ireland. Passengers will not be required to use passports, but may be required to produce one of several types of documentation, including passports, when travelling, to enable the carrier to meet the requirements of a police request.

— Liam Byrne, Minister of State for Immigration, Citizenship and Nationality, House of Commons Debate, 14 January 2008.

As far as the land border is concerned, the proposal indicated that the border would be "lightly controlled" and a joint statement in 2008 by both governments confirmed that there are no plans for fixed controls on either side of the border.

On 1 April 2009, an amendment moved by Lord Glentoran in the House of Lords defeated the British government's proposal and preserved the CTA. The relevant clause was re-introduced by Home Office minister Phil Woolas in the Public Bill Committee in June, but again removed in July after opposition pressure.

=== 2011 memorandum of understanding ===
2011 marked the first public agreement between the British and Irish governments concerning the maintenance of the CTA. Officially entitled the "Joint Statement Regarding Co-Operation on Measures to Secure the External Common Travel Area Border" it was signed in Dublin on 20 December 2011 by the UK's immigration minister, Damian Green, and Ireland's Minister for Justice and Equality, Alan Shatter. The two ministers also signed an unpublished memorandum of understanding at the same time.

In common with its non-published predecessors, the 2011 agreement is nonbinding, with its eighth clause stating that the agreement "is not intended to create legally binding obligations, nor to create or confer any right, privilege or benefit on any person or party, private or public".

The agreement commits the two governments to continue their co-operation through the CTA, to align their lists of visa-free countries, to develop "electronic border management system/s", to engage in data sharing to combat the "abuse" of the CTA, and to work toward a "fully-common short stay visit visa".

=== 2016–2017: Brexit ===
The UK voted to leave the European Union in a referendum on 23 June 2016 (and ceased to be a member state on 31 January 2020). This withdrawal from the EU makes the Republic of Ireland–United Kingdom border on the island of Ireland an external border of the European Union. However, the Irish and British governments and the President of the European Council have stated that they do not wish for a hard border in Ireland, taking into account the historical and social "sensitivities" that permeate the island. In September 2016 the British Secretary of State for Exiting the European Union, David Davis, stated that the British government would not seek a return to a "hard border" between the UK and Ireland.

In October 2016, the British and Irish governments considered in outline a plan entailing British immigration controls being applied at Ireland's ports and airports after Brexit, so that the UK might control migration by EU citizens (other than Irish nationals) across the open border into the United Kingdom. This would avoid passport checks being required between the Republic of Ireland and Northern Ireland (i.e. the UK). However, this agreement was never finalised and was met by opposition from political parties in Ireland. On 23 March 2017, it was confirmed that British immigration officials would not be allowed to use Ireland's ports and airports.

In June 2017, the British government's policy paper on the position of EU citizens in the UK stated a desire to "protect the Common Travel Area arrangements", stating that "Irish citizens residing in the UK will not need to apply for 'settled status' to protect their entitlements".

=== 2019 memorandum of understanding ===
On 8 May 2019, Tánaiste Simon Coveney and British Cabinet Office minister David Lidington signed a memorandum of understanding in an effort to secure the rights of Irish and British citizens post-Brexit. The document was signed in London before a meeting of the British-Irish Intergovernmental Conference, putting the rights of both states' citizens, already in place under the Common Travel Area, on a more secure footing.

Paragraph 17 of the memorandum of understanding states: "The foregoing record represents the common understanding of the Participants upon the matters referred to therein. It is not of itself intended to create legally binding obligations. The longstanding durability of the CTA has benefited from a degree of flexibility and the detail of the foregoing arrangements may continue to evolve".

The agreement, which is the culmination of over two years' work of both governments, means the rights of both countries' citizens are protected after Brexit while also ensuring that Ireland will continue to meet its obligations under EU law. The agreement took effect on 31 January 2020 when the United Kingdom eventually left the European Union.

=== COVID-19 pandemic ===
The COVID-19 pandemic led to the Irish government implementing a series of measures restricting or imposing additional conditions for entry from the UK. The British government did not at any time restrict or impose additional conditions for entry from Ireland, with the exception of travellers who had been outside the CTA within the preceding 10-14 days.

=== British immigration system from 2021 ===
On 31 December 2020, the Immigration Act 1971 was amended by adding "An Irish citizen does not require leave to enter or remain in the United Kingdom..." (Note: The rest of section 3ZA sets out exceptions.) The act repeals free movement rights for other EU citizens from 1 January 2021, but makes exceptions for Irish citizens. Guidance from the government also states: "Irish citizens will continue to be able to enter and live in the UK as they do now".

== Identity and immigration checks ==
=== Channel Islands ===
Immigration checks are carried out by the Guernsey Border Agency and the Jersey Customs and Immigration Service on passengers arriving in the Channel Islands only from outside the CTA.

The requirement for EU citizens to present passports to enter the Common Travel Area resulted in a drop of day visitors to Jersey in particular, resolved in 2022 when Jersey (with UK approval) permitted French nationals to enter Jersey on day trips using just their national ID card. Guernsey followed suit, permitting French nationals to day trip to Alderney, Sark and Guernsey. This concession is likely to end when the Electronic Travel Authorisation becomes applicable to French citizens.

=== Ireland ===
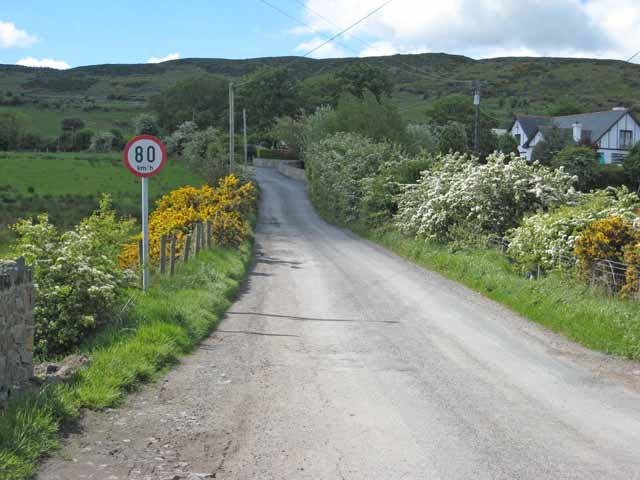
The border at Killeen, County Armagh, marked only by a speed limit sign

In 1997, Ireland changed its immigration legislation to allow immigration officers to examine (i.e. request identity documents from) travellers arriving in the state by sea or air (from elsewhere in the CTA) and to refuse them permission to land if they are not entitled to enter. Although formally this applies only to people other than Irish and British citizens, both of the latter groups are effectively covered as they may be required to produce identity documents to prove that they are entitled to the CTA arrangements. Targeted controls are conducted along the land border in what are referred to as "intelligence driven operations". Air passengers arriving at Irish airports from elsewhere in the CTA are no longer channelled separately from those arriving from outside the CTA. Consequently, all sea and air passengers must pass through Irish immigration checks administered by the Garda National Immigration Bureau (GNIB). While British citizens are not required to be in possession of a valid travel document as a condition of entry, they may be required to satisfy immigration officials as to their nationality.

The nature of the Irish controls was described by an Irish High Court judge, Mr Justice Gerard Hogan, in the following terms:

The practical result of this is that all persons arriving by air from the United Kingdom face Irish immigration controls. While in theory both Irish and British citizens are entitled to arrive here free from immigration control by virtue of the common travel area, increasingly in practice such passengers who arrive by air from the United Kingdom are required to produce their passports (or, at least, some other form of acceptable identity document) in order to prove to immigration officers that they are either Irish or British citizens who can avail of the common travel area.

In 2012, a pilot project was set up to use civilian staff from the Immigration section of the Irish Naturalisation and Immigration Service (INIS) to work with GNIB staff at immigration control at Dublin Airport. INIS staff would be responsible for performing all "in-booth" duties (including examining arriving passengers), but would not take part in any matters related to restraint, detention or arrest.

==== Transit without visa for Irish biometric visa holders ====
British visa requirements published in July 2019 allow certain travellers to transit without visa "landside" (i.e. those who need or wish to pass through the British border and enter the UK). They must arrive and depart by air, have a confirmed onward flight that departs before 23:59 the following day, and hold the correct documents for their destination (e.g. a visa for that country if required).

Nationals of all countries need a visa to transit landside unless they hold a valid Irish biometric visa, endorsed BC or BC BIVS, and are travelling to Ireland. Therefore, a holder of a biometric Irish visa does not require a separate British visa if transiting landside through the British border on their way to Ireland.

=== Isle of Man ===
The Isle of Man Government reports that "on-entry Immigration Control is rarely undertaken in the Isle of Man as there are very few transport services entering the Isle of Man from outside the CTA." As of August 2026 the only regular commercial air service between the Isle of Man and an airport outside the Common Travel Area is Geneva Switzerland in the winter months, plus charters to Faro and Costa de Sol.

The Isle of Man is considered a part of the UK for customs purposes, and so there are no routine customs checks on travellers arriving from the UK.

=== United Kingdom ===
The UK Border Force does not carry out routine immigration checks on travellers (regardless of nationality) arriving in the UK from another part of the CTA. However, the UK Border Force carries out selective customs checks on travellers arriving from elsewhere in the CTA.

==== Travel within the UK ====
During The Troubles, Section 8 of the Prevention of Terrorism (Temporary Provisions) Act 1974 provided for temporary powers to examine persons travelling between Northern Ireland and Great Britain. Schedule 7 of the Terrorism Act 2000 provides for similar powers and remains in force.

According to the Home Office, with regard to the legal basis for identity screening and immigration checks at airports and sea ports, as carried out on passengers travelling between Northern Ireland and Great Britain, "Immigration Enforcement officers may arrest without warrant anyone they have reasonable grounds to suspect has committed an immigration offence and/or may be liable for removal directions." Section 31.19.3 of the Enforcement Instructions and Guidance (part of the visas and immigration operational guidance), relating to the case law Baljinder Singh v. Hammond, said "Any questioning must be consensual. The paragraph 2 power to examine does not include a power to compel someone to stop or to require someone to comply with that examination. Should a person seek to exercise their right not to answer questions and leave, there is no power to arrest that person purely on suspicion of committing an immigration offence."

As in most countries, airlines may require photo identification (e.g. a passport or a driving licence) for internal flights between destinations within the UK.

Because of the Northern Ireland Protocol as the result of Brexit, custom checks may be conducted for movement from Great Britain to Northern Ireland.

== Common visa system ==
In October 2014, the British and Irish governments signed a memorandum of understanding, which became known as the British-Irish Visa Scheme, paving the way for mutually recognised visas allowing visitors to travel to the UK and Ireland on a single visa. The UK and Ireland recognised short-term visas issued for just Chinese and Indian nationals. A visa is needed from the first country the visitor enters.

While the CTA has, for most of its history, involved an open or relatively open border, since the Second World War this has not meant that someone who legally entered one part of the CTA was automatically entitled to enter another part. Unlike the Schengen Agreement, the CTA currently provides no automatic mechanism for the mutual recognition of leave to enter and remain, and the UK and Ireland operate separate visa systems with distinct entry requirements.

In July 2011, Ireland introduced a short-stay visa waiver programme under which the normal requirement for certain nationalities to hold an Irish visa is waived for visitors to the UK who hold valid British visas. Belarus and Russia were removed from the list on 25 October 2022. The scheme is scheduled to end on 31 October 2026.

The Channel Islands and the Isle of Man allow entry to holders of British visas (with some exceptions). Both the Bailiwick of Guernsey and the Bailiwick of Jersey immigration authorities check all entrants other than those from the UK.

Nationalities that need a visa for Ireland but not for the UK:

- Bahrain
- Kuwait
- Marshall Islands
- Mauritius
- Micronesia
- Oman
- Palau
- Papua New Guinea
- Peru
- Qatar
- Saint Kitts and Nevis
- Saudi Arabia

Nationalities that need a visa for the UK but not for Ireland:

- El Salvador
- Fiji
- Ukraine

Nationalities that may use a British or Irish visa to travel between the UK and Ireland:

- China
- India

Nationalities that may use a British visa to travel from the UK to Ireland:

- Bahrain
- Bosnia and Herzegovina
- Colombia
- Indonesia
- Kazakhstan
- Kosovo
- Kuwait
- Montenegro
- North Macedonia
- Oman
- Peru
- Philippines
- Qatar
- Saudi Arabia
- Serbia
- Thailand
- Turkey
- Uzbekistan
- Vietnam

== Freedom of movement ==
British and Irish citizens enjoyed the right to live in each other's countries under European Union law, but even after Brexit the provisions that apply to them are generally more far reaching than those that apply to other European Economic Area nationals. As of February 2020, entry to the Common Travel Area by citizens of third countries is controlled by British or by Irish immigration officers according to the point of entry: arrangements after the UK leaves the post-Brexit transition period are yet to be determined.

=== British citizens in Ireland ===
Under Irish law, all British citizens—including Manx people and Channel Islanders, who were not entitled to take advantage of the European Union's freedom of movement provisions—are exempt from immigration control and immune from deportation. They are entitled to live in Ireland without any restrictions or conditions. They have, with limited exceptions, never been treated as foreigners under Irish law, having never been subject to the Aliens Act 1935 or to any orders made under that Act. British citizens can thus move to Ireland to live, work or retire and unlike EU citizens, they are not required to demonstrate having sufficient resources or have private health insurance in order to retire. This is due to the fact that British citizens are also entitled to use Irish public services on the same basis as Irish citizens in Ireland.

=== Irish citizens in the United Kingdom ===
Under British law, Irish citizens are entitled to enter and live in the United Kingdom without any restrictions or conditions. They also have the right to vote, work, study and access welfare and healthcare services.

Before 1949, all Irish citizens were considered under British law to be British subjects.

After Ireland declared itself a republic in 1949, a consequent British law gave Irish citizens a similar status to Commonwealth citizens in the United Kingdom, notwithstanding that they had ceased to be such. Thus, much like British citizens in Ireland, Irish citizens in the United Kingdom have retained similar legal rights.

Irish citizens have not, however, like Commonwealth citizens, been subject to immigration control in the UK since the enactment of the Commonwealth Immigrants Act 1962. Unlike Commonwealth citizens, Irish citizens have generally not been subject to entry control in the United Kingdom and, if they move to the UK, are considered to have 'settled status' (a status that goes beyond indefinite leave to remain). They may be subject to deportation from the UK upon the same basis as other European Economic Area nationals. In practice, however, this is extremely difficult and occurs only in exceptional circumstances.

In February 2007, the British government announced that a specially lenient procedure would apply to the deportation of Irish citizens compared to the procedure for other European Economic Area nationals. As a result, Irish nationals are not routinely considered for deportation from the UK when they are released from prison. The government's approach to the deportation of Irish citizens since 2007 is to only deport Irish citizens where recommended by a court in sentencing or in exceptional circumstances where that deportation is in the public interest.

=== Other European Economic Area nationals ===
Nationals of member states of the European Economic Area other than British and Irish nationals have the right to freely enter and reside in Ireland under European Union law (and had the same right in the UK while the latter was a member of the EU). They are required to carry a valid travel document, a passport or a national identity card, for entering the CTA and for travelling between Ireland and the UK.

But plans for a UK electronic travel authorisation would reduce the right to travel in the Common Travel Area for non-Irish EU citizens. This decision was reversed. Those legally resident in the Republic of Ireland who would not normally need a British visa would be exempt from having to apply for an Electronic Travel Authorisation if they are arriving in Northern Ireland from within the Common Travel Area.

== Citizens' rights ==
The citizens' rights are very similar to rights as if they were natural citizens of that country, the only real difference being that Irish citizens resident in Great Britain are not granted a British Passport and British citizens resident in Ireland are not granted an Irish Passport.

=== Working ===
British or Irish citizens can work in either country, including on a self-employed basis, without needing any permission from the authorities.

In support of this, the British government is committed to ensuring that, now that the UK has left the EU, appropriate and comprehensive provisions continue to be in place for the recognition of professional qualifications obtained in Ireland. The Irish government has also committed to working to ensure the provision of arrangements with the UK to recognise professional qualifications.

=== Education ===
British and Irish citizens have the right to access all levels of education in either state, on terms no less favourable than those available to the citizens of that state. Both governments have committed to taking steps to ensure that this continues now that the UK has left the EU.

Both governments have also committed to taking steps to ensure that British and Irish citizens pursuing further and higher education in the other state, will continue to have the right to qualify for student loans and support under applicable schemes and eligibility conditions.

=== Social security benefits ===
British or Irish citizens residing or working in the other's state, working in both states or working across the border are subject to only one state's social security legislation at a time. They can access social security benefits and entitlements, including pensions, from whichever state they are subject to the social security legislation of, regardless of where they are living.

When working in the CTA, workers pay into the social security scheme of the state where the employer is 'based for tax purposes' (Multinational corporations may have such a base in each state). They are entitled, when in the other state, to the same social security rights, and are subject to the same obligations, as citizens of that state.

Workers also have the right to access social security benefits on the same basis as citizens of the state where they are employed. The British and Irish governments have concluded a bilateral agreement to ensure that these rights will continue to be protected now that the UK has left the EU.

=== Healthcare ===
British and Irish citizens have the right to access healthcare in either state. When visiting they also have the right to access needs-arising health care during their stay. Both governments have committed to taking steps to ensure that this will continue now that the UK has left the EU.

=== Social housing support ===
British or Irish citizens residing in the other state have the right to access social housing, including supported housing and homeless assistance, on the same basis as citizens of that state. Both governments have committed to taking steps to ensure that this will continue now that the UK has left the EU.

=== Voting rights ===
British or Irish citizens living in the other state are entitled to register to vote with the relevant authorities for local and national parliamentary elections only in that state on the same basis as citizens of that state. Upon reaching voting age, they are entitled to vote in those elections on the same basis as citizens of that state. Both governments have committed to ensuring that these arrangements will continue now that the UK has left the EU. However, while Irish citizens can vote in British referendums, British citizens are not able to vote in Irish referendums, presidential elections or Irish elections for the European Parliament.

== Schengen Area ==
A clickable Euler diagram showing the relationships between various European regional organisations

In 1985, five member states of the European Economic Community (EEC) signed the Schengen Agreement on the gradual phasing out of border controls between them. This treaty and the implementation convention of 1990 paved the way for the creation of the Schengen Area which was implemented in 1995, and by 1997 all European Union member states except the United Kingdom and Ireland had signed the agreement. The Amsterdam Treaty, drafted that year, incorporated Schengen into EU law while giving Ireland and the UK an opt-out permitting them to maintain systematic passport and immigration controls at their frontiers. The wording of the treaty makes Ireland's opt-out from eliminating border controls conditional on the Common Travel Area being maintained. An important reason for the Schengen Agreement was to make daily cross-border commuting by workers easier as a part of free movement for workers. The United Kingdom and Ireland have a short land border, which is only to part of the UK, making this reason less important to them.

The British government has always refused to lower its border controls as it believes that the island status of the CTA puts the UK in a better position to enforce immigration controls than mainland European countries with "extensive and permeable land borders". While not signing the Schengen Treaty, Ireland has always looked more favourably on joining but has not done so in order to maintain the CTA and its open border with Northern Ireland, though in 1997 Ireland amended its Aliens Order to permit identity and immigration controls on arrivals from the United Kingdom.

== Identification requirements ==
Most transport operators permit passengers to travel within the Common Travel Area without a passport, although photo ID is required for Irish or British citizens travelling by air, and Ryanair requires all passengers to carry a passport or a national identity card, although for domestic British flights other photo ID might be accepted.

In 2014, a private member's bill was put before the Oireachtas which proposed to prohibit transport operators from requiring the production of a passport for travel within the Common Travel Area, but it was not passed. The Irish government in October 2015 started issuing passport cards, which are the same size as national identity cards of other EU countries and are accepted by all transport operators, but the issuing of a passport card requires the holder to already have a conventional passport book.

== See also ==
- British nationality law
- Irish nationality law
- Ireland–United Kingdom relations
  - Foreign relations of the Republic of Ireland
  - Foreign relations of the United Kingdom
- Central America-4 Border Control Agreement
- Nordic Passport Union
- Schengen Area an arrangement, similar to the Common Travel Area, between European countries
- UK Immigration Service
- Visa policy of the European Union
- Trans-Tasman Travel Arrangement an arrangement, similar to the Common Travel Area, between Australia and New Zealand
- Union State, an arrangement, similar to the Common Travel Area, that exists between Belarus and Russia
- 1950 Indo-Nepal Treaty of Peace and Friendship
- United Kingdom–Crown Dependencies Customs Union
