= Portland Police =

Portland Police may refer to:

- Port of Portland Police Department (Oregon), USA
- Port of Portland Police (United Kingdom)
- Portland Police Bureau, Oregon, USA
- Portland Police Department (Maine), USA

== See also ==
- Port of Portland Police (disambiguation)
