= Association of Chief Police Officers =

British not-for-profit limited company

Agency overview
- Formed: 1948, not-for-profit limited company incorporation 1997
- Dissolved: April 2015, replaced by the National Police Chiefs' Council
- Employees: 21

Operational structure
- Headquarters: 10 Victoria Street, London, SW1H 0NN
- Agency executive: Sir Hugh Orde, Chief constable

Website
- http://www.acpo.police.uk (archived link from March 2015)

The Association of Chief Police Officers of England, Wales and Northern Ireland (ACPO) was a not-for-profit private limited company that for many years led the development of policing practices in England, Wales, and Northern Ireland. Established in 1948, ACPO provided a forum for chief police officers to share ideas and coordinate their strategic operational responses, and advised government in matters such as terrorist attacks and civil emergencies. ACPO coordinated national police operations, major investigations, cross-border policing, and joint law enforcement. ACPO designated Senior Investigative Officers for major investigations and appointed officers to head ACPO units specialising in various areas of policing and crime reduction.

The last ACPO president, from April 2009 until its dissolution, was Sir Hugh Orde, who was previously the chief constable of the Police Service of Northern Ireland.

ACPO was funded by Home Office grants, profits from commercial activities and contributions from the 44 police authorities in England, Wales, and Northern Ireland.

Following the Parker Review into ACPO, it was replaced in 2015 by a new body, the National Police Chiefs' Council, set up under a police collaboration agreement under Section 22A of the Police Act 1996.

== Background ==
UK policing sprang from local communities in the 1800s. Since the origins of policing, chief officers have regularly associated to discuss and share policing issues. Although ACPO as now recognised was formed in 1948, records of prior bodies go back to the early 1900s. The UK retains a decentralised model of policing based around the settlement which emerged from the Royal Commission on the work of the Police in 1962.

ACPO continued to provide a forum for chief officers across 44 local police forces and 13 national areas across England, Wales and Northern Ireland, and provided local forces with agreed national policies and guidelines. Originally more of a gentleman's club, it soon evolved into an effective body for representing senior ranks in the police service.

ACPO failed to convince its sponsors to contribute to its survival and in May 2011 the BBC reported that ACPO would run out of money in February 2012 without extra funding. ACPO was half-funded by the Home Office and half by 44 police authorities. A third of police authorities refused to pay in 2010 and another third were undecided. The Association of Police Authorities said the withdrawal of funding by police authorities was "partly due to a squeeze on their income". ACPO was due to wind up formally in April 2015.

== Constitutional status ==
Over time, demands for coordination across the police service increased as society changed, for example to take account of new developments in international terrorism and organised crime, or roles such as monitoring offenders on release from prison or working with young people to divert them from crime.

In 1997, ACPO was incorporated as a private company limited by guarantee. As a private company, ACPO was not subject to freedom of information legislation. It was not a staff association; the staff association for senior police officers was a separate body, the Chief Police Officers' Staff Association (CPOSA).

The change in structure from a "band of volunteers" to a limited company allowed the organisation to employ staff, enter into contracts for accommodation and publish accounts.

A number of options were considered for the status of ACPO, including charitable status, but all were discounted.

Chief constables and commissioners are responsible for the direction and control of policing in their force areas. Although a national body and recognized by the government for consultation, ACPO had no powers of its own, nor any mandate to instruct chief officers. However, the organisation allowed chief officers to form a national policy rather than replicate the work in each of their forces. For example, after the 1980–81 riots in 27 British cities including in St. Pauls and Brixton ACPO began to prepare the Public Order Manual of Tactical Operations and Related Matters. Police forces began training in its tactics late in 1983.

== Membership ==
ACPO was not a staff association. It acted for the police service, not its members. The separate Chief Police Officers' Staff Association acts for chief officers.

ACPO was composed of the chief police officers of the 44 police forces in England and Wales and Northern Ireland, the deputy chief constable and assistant chief constable of 42 of those forces and the deputy commissioner, assistant commissioner, deputy assistant commissioner and commanders of the remaining two – the Metropolitan Police and City of London Police. Certain senior non-police staff and senior members of national police agencies and certain other specialised and non-geographical forces in the UK, the Isle of Man and the Channel Islands were also members.

As of March 2010, there were 349 members of ACPO. The membership elected a full-time President, who held the office of Chief Constable under the Police Reform Act 2002.

== ACPO bodies ==
ACPO was responsible for several ancillary bodies, which it either funded or which received Home Office funding but which reported to ACPO:

=== ACPO Criminal Records Office ===
The ACPO Criminal Records Office (ACRO) was set up in 2006 in response to a perceived gap in the police service's ability to manage criminal records and in particular to improve links to biometric data. The initial aim of ACRO was to provide operational support relating to criminal records and associated biometric data, including DNA and fingerprint recognition.

It also issues police certificates, for a fee, needed to obtain immigration visas for countries including Australia, Belgium, Canada, Cayman Islands, New Zealand, South Africa and the United States.

The organisation continues under the style "ACRO Criminal Records Office" under the control of Hampshire Constabulary.

Between 17 January 2023 and 21 March 2023, a two-month cybersecurity incident affected the ACPO Criminal Records Office (ACRO) website. On 21 March 2023, ACRO announced that applications were no longer available online. Applications for police certificates, crucial for some visas to New Zealand, the United States, and Canada, are being processed manually by email, during the forced shut down, until the systems are fixed.

=== ACPO Vehicle Crime Intelligence Service ===
The Association of Chief Police Officers Vehicle Crime Intelligence Service (AVCIS), later the National Vehicle Crime Intelligence Service (NAVCIS), was managed by ACPO, and was responsible for combating organised vehicle crime and the use of vehicles in crime.

=== National Community Tension Team ===
The National Community Tension Team (NCTT) was an ACPO body which monitored religious, racial, or other tensions within communities, and provided liaison between police forces and community organisations.

=== National Counter Terrorism Security Office ===
The National Counter Terrorism Security Office was funded by, and reported to, ACPO and advised the British government on its counter terrorism strategy.

=== Police National Information and Co-ordination Centre ===
ACPO was responsible for coordinating the national mobilisation of police resources at times of national need through the Police National Information and Co-ordination Centre (PNICC), which it set up in 2003. This included ensuring policing resilience during major events such as emergency response to serious flooding or the investigation of a terrorist attack. PNICC sat alongside the government in COBR (Cabinet Office Briefing Room) to advise on national issues. PNICC also handled support to overseas crises involving UK nationals.

It employed three full-time staff, with other staff seconded to it as needed and is funded by contributions from each of the police forces.

=== Counter Terrorism Internet Referral Unit ===
The Counter Terrorism Internet Referral Unit (CTIRU) was set up in 2010 by ACPO (and run by the Metropolitan Police) to remove unlawful terrorist material content from the Internet with a focus on UK based material.

The December 2013 report of the Prime Minister's Extremism task force, said that it would "work with internet companies to restrict access to terrorist material online which is hosted overseas but illegal under UK law" and "work with the internet industry to help them in their continuing efforts to identify extremist content to include in family-friendly filters" which would likely involve lobbying ISPs to add the CTIRU list to their filters without the need for additional legislation.

=== National Wildlife Crime Unit ===
The National Wildlife Crime Unit is a national police unit that gathers intelligence on wildlife crime and provides analytical and investigative support to law enforcement agencies.

== Controversies ==
=== Freedom of information ===
ACPO had been criticised as being unaccountable to Parliament or the public by virtue of its limited company status. In October 2009, Sir Hugh Orde stated that ACPO would be "more than happy" to be subject to the Freedom of Information Act. On 30 March 2010, the Ministry of Justice announced that ACPO would be included under the FOI Act from October 2011. In its response, the organisation stated that "Although organisations cannot voluntarily comply with the Act, a large proportion of ACPO's work is public already or available under FOI through any police force". In January 2011 its website still said it: "is unable to do is to respond to requests for information under the Act. The organisation is too small and there are too few members of staff to be able to conduct the necessary research and to compile the responses". From November 2011, however, FOI requests could be made to ACPO.

=== Apartments ===
The organisation was criticised in February 2010 for allegedly spending £1.6 million per year from government anti-terrorist funding grants on renting up to 80 apartments in the centre of London which were reported as being empty most of the time. The organisation responded that it had reviewed this policy and would reduce the number of apartments.

=== Undercover activities ===
As a result of The Guardian articles with regards to the activities and accusations of PC Mark Kennedy of the National Public Order Intelligence Unit within the National Extremism Tactical Co-ordination Unit, and the collapse of the subsequent trial of six activists, a number of initiatives and changes were announced:

- Acknowledging that "something had gone very wrong" in the Kennedy case to the Home Affairs Select Committee, Home Office minister Nick Herbert stated that ACPO would lose control of three teams involved in tackling domestic extremism. Herbert announced that the units would be transferred to the Metropolitan Police, with acting commissioner Tim Godwin confirming that this would occur at the earliest possible timescale.
- Her Majesty's Inspectorate of Constabulary announced that Bernard Hogan-Howe would lead an investigation into ACPO, to assess whether undercover operations had been "authorised in accordance with law" and "proportionate".
- The Association of Police Authorities said it was ending its annual £850,000 grant to ACPO.

=== DNA database ===
ACPO has supervised the creation of one of the world's largest per-capita DNA databases, containing the DNA profiles of more than one million unconvicted people. ACPO's guidelines that these profiles should only be deleted in "exceptional circumstances" were found to be unlawful by the UK Supreme Court in May 2011. They were found to be incompatible with the European Convention on Human Rights, following the ruling by the European Court of Human Rights in S and Marper v United Kingdom. On 1 May 2012, the Protection of Freedoms Act 2012 completed its passage through Parliament and received Royal Assent. Up until it ceased to exist in 2015, ACPO did not reissue revised guidelines to replace its unlawful DNA exceptional procedure. Big Brother Watch, in a report of June 2012, has adopted the view that, despite the Protection of Freedoms Act 2012, the retention of DNA in England and Wales remains an uncertain and illiberal regime.

=== Fake uniforms ===
During the summer of 2011, Hugh Orde, then president of the ACPO, was seen wearing a dark blue police-style uniform with ACPO insignia, and was accused of wearing a fake uniform. Senior police officers claimed that the uniform was not that of any police force in the country but "closely resembled" the uniform worn by former Metropolitan Police commissioner Paul Stephenson. Sam Leith, an author, journalist and literary editor of The Spectator, mocked Orde's decision "to wear this Gadaffi-style pretend uniform on television", and suggested it was "a subliminal pitch for the Met Commissioner's job". Brian Paddick, a retired Deputy Assistant Commissioner then seeking to be the Liberal Democrat candidate for Mayor of London, said: "It's unusual for the president of ACPO to appear in all these interviews in uniform. He is sending a clear signal: 'how would I look in the commissioner's uniform?'"

== Parker Review ==
In 2013, an independent review of ACPO by General Sir Nick Parker was published. It recommended that ACPO be replaced by a new body, in the interests of greater transparency and cost effectiveness. On the basis of these recommendations, a new organization, the National Police Chiefs' Council, was set up to replace ACPO, which it did on 1 April 2015.
