= Port of Portland Police =

Port of Portland Police may refer to two police forces:

- Port of Portland Police (United Kingdom), Isle of Portland, United Kingdom
- Port of Portland Police Department (Oregon), Portland, Oregon, United States

== See also ==
- Portland Police (disambiguation)
