= Wildlife liaison officer =

British policing role

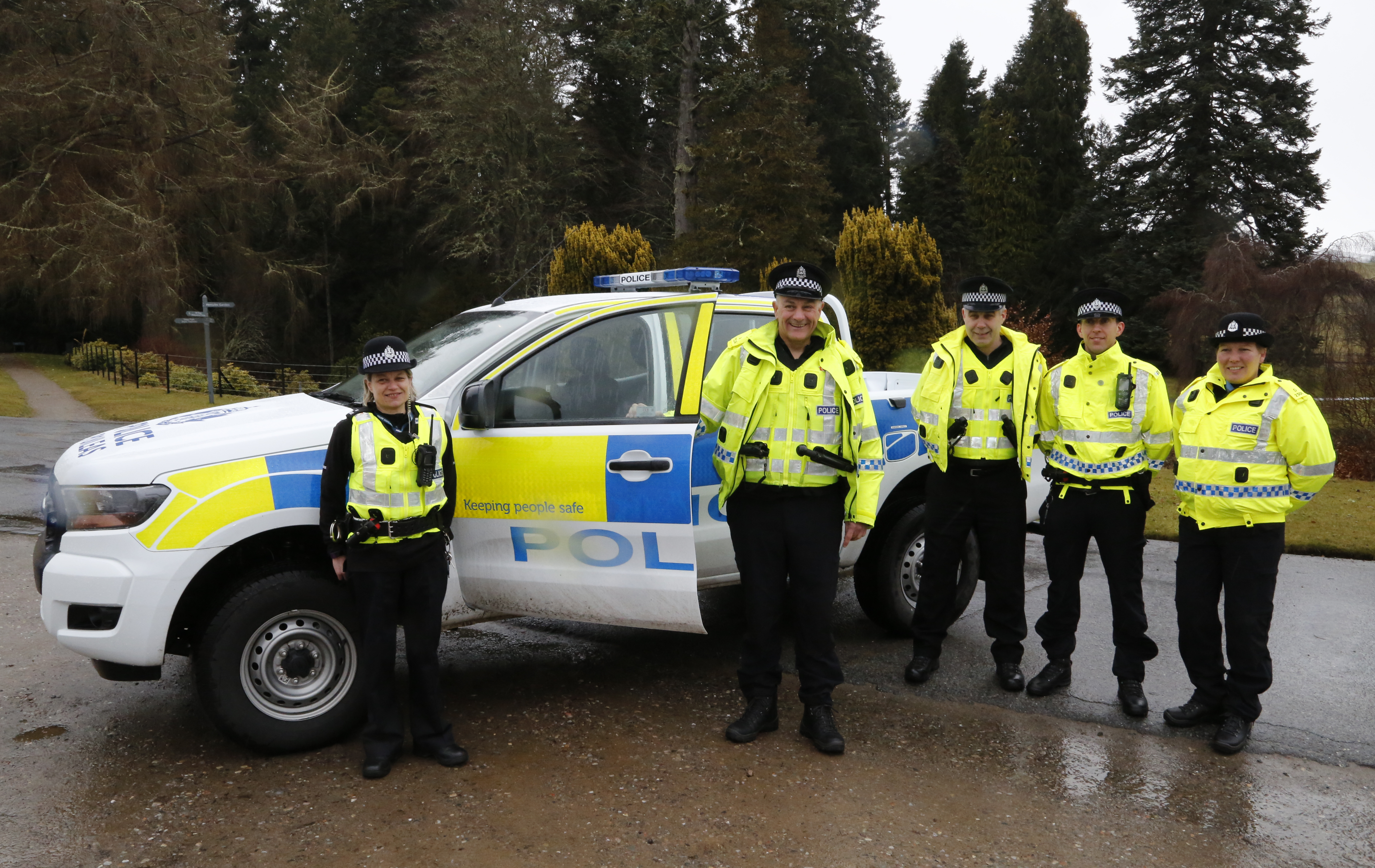
Wildlife crime officers working for Police Scotland in 2018

In the United Kingdom a Wildlife Liaison Officer (Wildlife Crime Officer in Scotland) is a specialist police officer tasked with combating wildlife crime, such as disturbance to native animals or the illegal import of animals or their by-products.

The role can be a full-time duty, or an adjunct to other duties.

== See also ==
- National Wildlife Crime Unit
