= Hillingdon Parks Patrol Service =

Hillingdon Parks Patrol Service was a small patrol body, responsible for policing the parks and open spaces of the London Borough of Hillingdon, England.

Members of the patrol service were sworn as constables from at least 2009 under section 18, Ministry of Housing and Local Government Provision Order Confirmation (Greater London Parks and Open Spaces) Act 1967. Such constables had the powers of a constable to enforce by-laws in relation to the parks and open areas of the borough.

All serious or major crime or incidents remained the responsibility of the local Home Office police force, the Metropolitan Police.

The patrol service had ceased to exist by November 2016, and their functions were split between other teams in the Council.

== See also ==
- Law enforcement in the United Kingdom
- List of law enforcement agencies in the United Kingdom, Crown Dependencies and British Overseas Territories
- Park police
