= Royal Falkland Islands Police =

- Badge of the RFIP

- Flag of the Falkland Islands
- Abbreviation: RFIP
- Motto: Integrity, Fairness and Respect.

Agency overview
- Formed: 1846
- Employees: 26 in total 20 police officers A pool of reserve police officers 6 police staff

Jurisdictional structure
- Operations jurisdiction: Falkland Islands
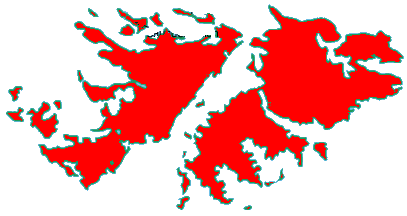
- Map of Royal Falkland Islands Police's jurisdiction
- Area: 12,173 km^{2} (4,700 sq mi)
- Population: 3,750 residents (approx), plus military garrison
- General nature: Local civilian police

Operational structure
- Headquarters: Stanley
- Constables: 20
- Civilians: 6
- Agency executives: T/ Superintendent Tom O'Brien, Chief Police Officer; T/ Inspector Cheryl Abrahams, Deputy Chief Police Officer

Facilities
- Stations: 1

Website
- https://www.police.gov.fk/

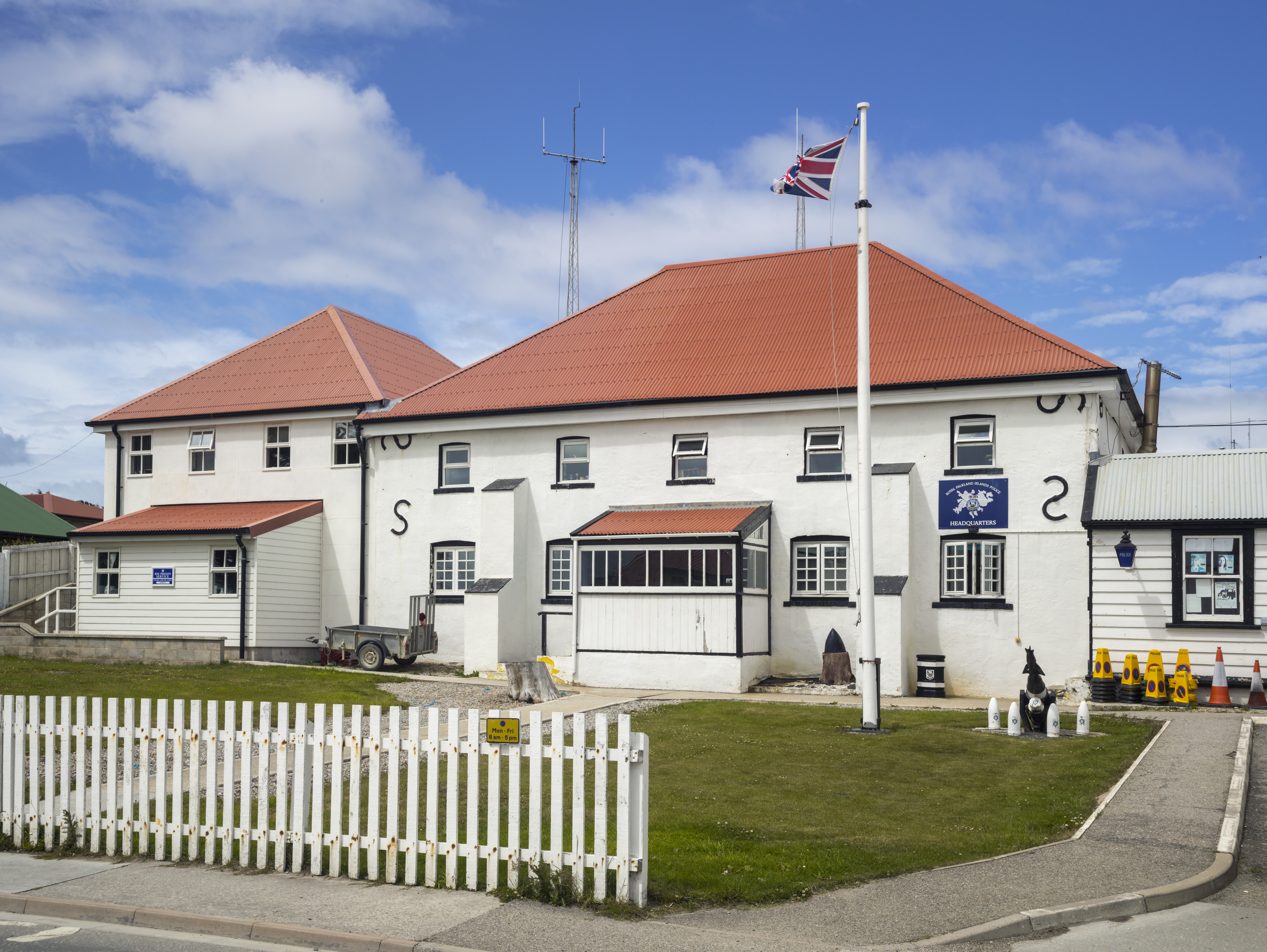
Royal Falkland Islands Police Headquarters, Stanley

The Royal Falkland Islands Police (RFIP) is the territorial police force responsible for law enforcement within the Falkland Islands.

== History ==
The force was established on 1 November 1846 with the appointment of Francis Parry as Chief Constable.

The Constables Ordinance 1846, which had been enacted by the colony's Legislative Council on 27 October of that year, created an organisation that has remained at the service of the public ever since.

It was initially staffed by three officers – the Chief Constable, the Gaoler (responsible for prisoners), and the Night Constable (responsible for policing during the night).

The police station, which has remained the headquarters building since it was completed in 1873, is situated centrally in Stanley. The building, which has had several wooden extensions added over the years, was built of stone by the detachment of Royal Marines that were stationed in the colony at that time.

Today all serving police officers are based at Stanley police station or the military base. Historically local constables were based at Fox Bay (by 1900), and the Jason Islands (by 1920), with another at Grytviken in South Georgia (also by 1920) chiefly to prevent seal poaching.

The police station took a direct hit from a British missile during the Falklands War on 11 June 1982 and was severely damaged.

The Falkland Islands Police Force was granted the "Royal" prefix by Queen Elizabeth II on 1 January 1992.

The fabric of the building was repaired but after 135 years of continual service it was totally refurbished in 2008. This was completed in 2009 with the new jail being opened by the Princess Royal on 24 March 2009.

== Operation ==
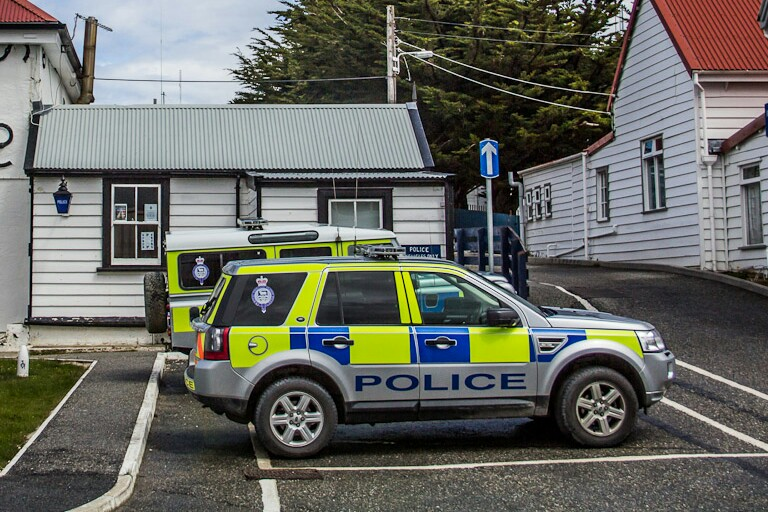
RFIP patrol vehicles at Stanley police station.

The current Chief Police Officer is Superintendent Tom O'Brien.

Communication is based on VHF FM radio and is encrypted. It is monitored from a Joint Control Room (JCR) in Stanley. The use of a repeater greatly extends the range of coverage.

Codes of practice are published originating from the Criminal Justice Ordinance 1989. All equipment issued to officers and practices used to comply with Home Office and Association of Chief Police Officers (ACPO) guidelines.

In common with British police practice, officers are not routinely armed.

Owing to the small size of the force, there are no permanent armed response units, although some officers are trained and certified as authorised firearms officers.

== Personnel ==
The RFIP has a total staff of 26, including sworn warranted constables and support staff to support the JCR.

The RFIP consists of:

- a Superintendent (Chief Police Officer),
- an Inspector (deputy),
- a Detective Sergeant,
- two uniformed Sergeants,
- twelve Police Constables,
- two Detective Constables,
- one Public Protection Officer
- two Reserve Police Sergeants
- a pool of Reserve Police Constables (similar to UK special constables but paid).

There are also

- a Senior Clerk,
- Five Controllers.

=== Ranks ===
The force uses the following standard British policing ranks:

Ranks of Royal Falkland Islands Police
Rank	Superintendent (Chief of Police)	Inspector (Deputy Chief of Police)	Sergeant	Constable	Reserve constable
Insignia	UK Police Superintendent Epaulette	UK Police Inspector Epaulette	UK Patrol Sergeant Epaulette	UK Police Constable Epaulette	UK Police Constable Epaulette

The RFIP is headed by a Chief Police Officer, who holds the rank of superintendent. The Chief Police Officer is assisted by a deputy chief officer who holds the rank of inspector.

=== Uniformed policing ===
Uniformed community policing is carried out by a team of twelve police constables and a pool reserve constables, supervised by two police sergeants.

=== Criminal Investigation Department ===
The island's permanent CID was formed in 2018. Previously criminal detection was undertaken by uniformed police officers. The CID is staffed by two detective constables and one detective sergeant.

== Prison service ==
Until November 2014, the RFIP also provided prison services on the Falkland Islands.

Since then, there has been a separate and independent prison service located adjacent to the police station provided by HM Prison Service.

== Other Falklands police services ==
Owing to the large military presence on the Falkland Islands there is always a contingent of military police – known as Joint Service Police & Security Unit (JSPSU), British Forces South Atlantic – stationed on the island.

As a matter of policy, all British military police officers from all three services assigned to the Falklands are also sworn in as RFIP reserve constables, so that they have full civil police powers during their tour of duty.

== See also ==
- International Criminal Police Organization (Interpol)
- Military police of the United Kingdom
