= National Police Chiefs' Council =

Co-ordinating body for policing in the UK

- Abbreviation: NPCC

Agency overview
- Formed: 1 April 2015
- Preceding agency: Association of Chief Police Officers

Jurisdictional structure
- Operations jurisdiction: United Kingdom

Operational structure
- Headquarters: 50 Broadway, London, SW1H 0BL
- Agency executive: Gavin Stephens, Chair

Website
- www.npcc.police.uk

The National Police Chiefs' Council (NPCC) is a national coordination body for law enforcement in the United Kingdom and the representative body for senior police officers in the United Kingdom. Established on 1 April 2015, it replaced the former Association of Chief Police Officers (ACPO), following the Parker Review of the operations of ACPO.

== History ==
A body bringing together chief officers to share ideas and drive improvements in policing has existed since the origins of policing. ACPO was formed in 1948 and its structure and work developed in response to national policing needs.

In 2010, the Cameron Government announced a series of police reforms including local accountability through Police and Crime Commissioners (PCC), and the creation of the National Crime Agency and the College of Policing. In 2013, the PCCs commissioned General Sir Nick Parker to review the services that ACPO provided and make recommendations about the requirements of a national policing body following the fundamental changes in policing. In 2014, a group of chief officers and PCCs began working together to implement Parker's recommendations and develop a national body. Chief officers voted in support of the group's proposals in July 2014. Chief Constable Sara Thornton was appointed to chair the NPCC on 2 December 2014. ACPO was closed down on 31 March 2015.

Assistant Commissioner Martin Hewitt was appointed as Chair in April 2019, after being elected to the role in November 2018. After serving for two full terms, he was succeeded by Chief Constable Gavin Stephens, who was appointed in April 2023 after being elected to the role in October 2022.

In 2021–2022, the NPCC began to introduce a new operating model. This saw the creation of a new Strategic Hub expanding the central support to Chief Constables and NPCC leads, and boosting the NPCC's coordination of critical national policing issues.

== Structure and membership ==
The NPCC is a collaboration body that enables independent Chief Constables and their forces to work together to improve policing for the public. The NPCC employs a Chair and a team to run and support its work. Legally, the NPCC is a national unit hosted by the Metropolitan Police Service, but acts independently.

The NPCC is underpinned by a legal agreement between relevant parties under Section 22a of the Police Act 1996 signed by Chief Constables, PCCs and non Home Office force equivalents.

In addition, from 2019-20 following a letter of agreement with NPCC, Police Scotland contributes to the funding of the NPCC, and the Chief Constable has the same involvement in the governance and arrangements of the NPCC as any other Chief Officer or PCC who is a signatory to the Section 22a agreement.

The NPCC brings together and is funded by police forces across the United Kingdom, as well as the armed services and some British Overseas Territories. It draws on the efforts and expertise of chief officers (those ranked assistant chief constable and above, or commander and above in MPS and City of London Police) and senior police staff equivalents. It coordinates police forces' collective operational responses to national threats such as terrorism, organised crime, and national emergencies.

The current NPCC chair is Gavin Stephens. Jeremy Vaughan and Rachel Swann QPM (chief constables of South Wales Police and Derbyshire Constabulary, respectively) support him as vice-chairs in addition to serving as chief officers within their forces.

=== Chief Constables' Council ===
Chief Constables' Council is the senior operational decision-making body for the NPCC. It brings together Chief Constables of police forces in the United Kingdom. These include those commanding territorial police forces as well as the Chief Constable of British Transport Police; the Chief Constable of the Ministry of Defence Police; the Chief Officer of the Civil Nuclear Constabulary, the Director General for the National Crime Agency (NCA), and the Chief Executive of the College of Policing. Chief Constables’ Council meets around four times a year, and is chaired by the NPCC Chair.

This body provides a forum for Chief Constables to discuss and consider issues and challenges in operational policing and, working alongside the College of Policing, agree national standards and common approaches.

=== Coordination committees ===
Chief officers support the NPCC by taking responsibility for crime and policing issues from a national operational perspective.

The decisions made by Chief Constables' Council are progressed through 13 coordination committees. Each committee is led by a chief officer, supported by a number of portfolios and working groups also led by chief officers, or police staff of an equivalent rank.

The outputs of NPCC committees are disseminated across forces for implementation at the discretion of each operationally independent Chief Constable. The committees are:

- Counter Terrorism (chaired by head of Counter Terrorism Policing)
- Crime Operations
- Criminal Justice
- Digital, Data and Technology
- Diversity, Equality and Inclusion
- Finance
- International
- Local Policing
- Operations
- Performance Management
- Prevention
- Science and Innovation
- Workforce

Coordination committees work closely with the College of Policing to assist in the development of professional practice for police officers in different areas of policing. Representatives from the Government and other stakeholders in the criminal justice system and third sector are involved in the committees' work to include a range of perspectives.

== National Police Coordination Centre (NPoCC) ==
The National Police Coordination Centre (NPoCC) is a national unit reporting to the NPCC Chair that provides support to forces across the United Kingdom, Crown Dependencies and British Overseas Territories. As of January 2025, Assistant Chief Constable Mark Williams is the Strategic Lead, in addition to being the National Mobilisation Coordinator.

NPoCC is made up of a small number of officers and staff drawn on secondment from police forces across the UK and is formed into two teams: Operations, and Strategic Intelligence and Briefing. NPoCC is funded by contributions from all forces under a separate Section 22a Collaboration Agreement.

NPoCC also provide a central co-ordination function for UK policing. Examples of such work include: Operation Talla (the national policing response to the COVID-19 pandemic) and Operation Wirebrick (the mobilisation of thousands of items of spare equipment to support colleagues in Ukraine, Moldova and Poland). NPoCC also coordinate nationally significant protests and public order activity.

Internationally, NPoCC support the British Overseas Territories, and will work with the Foreign, Commonwealth & Development Office on responses to major issues, such as contingency planning during the hurricane season. In addition, NPoCC work with forces from overseas territories and Crown Dependencies to ensure that their officers are represented and present during events of significant importance, such as at the Coronation of King Charles III.

NPoCC also support Chief Officers at the Civil Contingencies Committee (COBR) and regularly represent UK policing at official or ministerial level meetings relating to protest or disorder.

== United Kingdom Football Policing Unit (UKFPU) ==
The United Kingdom Football Policing Unit (UKFPU) are a team of police officers and police staff that support police forces and partner agencies to reduce incidents of football related anti-social behaviour, violence and disorder involving UK supporters.

The UKFPU gives advice, assistance and training to all police forces in England and Wales in order to provide a consistent approach to football events. The unit also provides the football arrest figures that are published annually by the Home Office.

== National Police Freedom of Information and Data Protection Unit (NPFDU) ==
The NPFDU acts as a national coordination body in providing professional advice and support for forces and stakeholders in all matters relating to both freedom of information (FOI) and data protection (DP) within the UK police service. It is underpinned by a separate Section 22a Collaboration Agreement.

== National Policing Units ==
The NPCC collaborates with a number of national policing units and bodies that operate across the UK.

- ACRO Criminal Records Office (ACRO)
- Counter Terrorism Policing
- National Business Crime Centre
- National Vehicle Crime Intelligence Service (NaVCIS)
- National Ballistics Intelligence Service (NABIS)
- National Domestic Extremism and Disorder Intelligence Unit (NDEDIU)
- National Police Air Service (NPAS)
- National Wildlife Crime Unit (NWCU)
- UK National Disaster Victim Identification Unit (UK DVI)

== See also ==
- The Hydrant Programme
- Tackling Organised Exploitation (TOEX) Programme
- Vulnerability Knowledge and Practice Programme (VKPP)
