= Birmingham Parks Police =

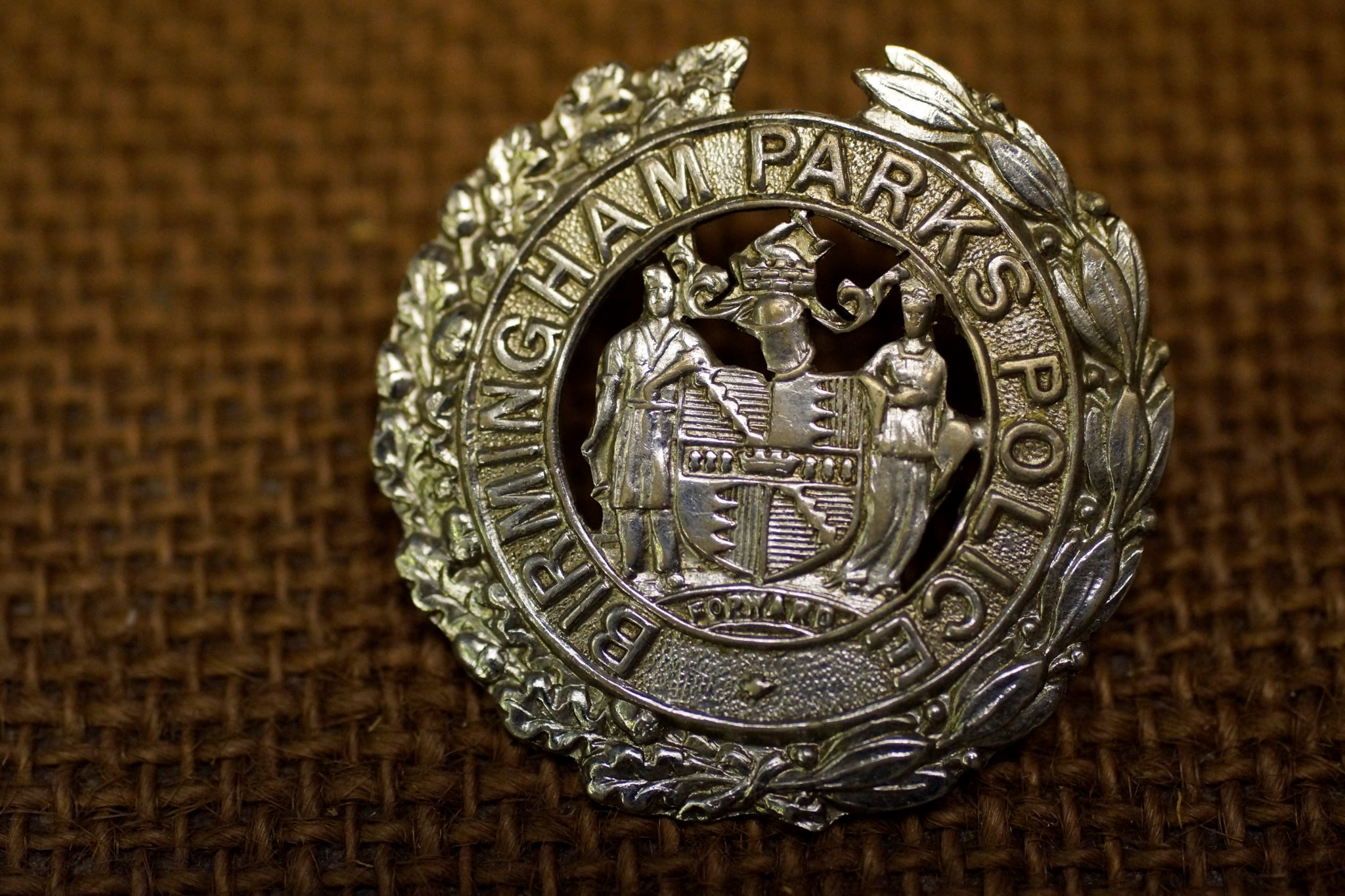
Cap badge (pre-1930)

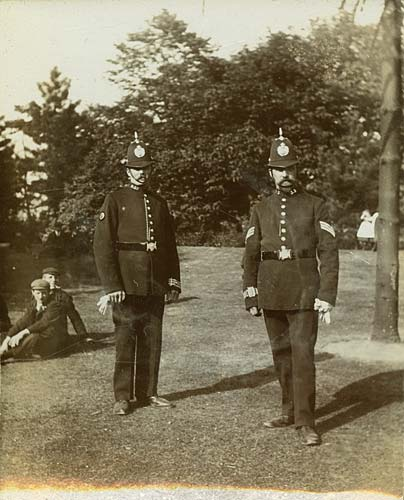
A photograph of officers of the Parks Police, taken between c. 1900 and 1910

Birmingham Parks Police was a small police force maintained by Birmingham Corporation to police the parks and open spaces of Birmingham, United Kingdom. They were first formed in 1912 and were disbanded in 1962, when they were replaced with Park Rangers.

== History ==
The parks of Birmingham were, at first, patrolled by Birmingham City Police. In the 1880s, the Parks Committee of the Corporation applied to Worcestershire Constabulary for additional officers to patrol Cannon Hill Park, because whilst the park was maintained by the Corporation, it was mainly used by ratepayers of Worcestershire. In 1883, the Birmingham Corporation (Consolidation) Act 1883 (46 & 47 Vict. c. lxx) permitted the corporation to appoint park keepers as constables. They were required to take the oath that a constable of the regular city police took under the Municipal Corporations Act 1882. They then had the "powers, authorities and privileges" of such a constable within the corporation's parks, whether within the limits of the city or not. In the late 1880s, reports in the Birmingham Daily Post show that both Cannon Hill Park and Calthorpe Park had become the location for sexual assaults on both adults and children, and the Parks Committee was keen to have more police to patrol Cannon Hill Park.

Minutes of the Parks Committee from 1907 suggest that the Committee thought that the levels of policing in the parks were insufficient, and that ordinary park employees were often left to deal with situations themselves. It was reported that:

...the ordinary park employee is ineffective to control certain classes frequenting the parks or recreation grounds, and in many instances is practically set at defiance by the rougher element...

— BCC Parks Committee Minutes, Meeting of 16 July 1907

Birmingham Parks Police was founded in 1912, and went on to patrol the parks until 1962, when they were replaced by Park Rangers. After their creation, the Committee noted that criminal proceedings had been started against several people for "indecent exposure and indecent conduct with young girls in the parks".

As with many occupations, women were first appointed to the Parks Police during World War I - partly to replace conscripted men, but also to assist in the supervision of children who used the parks. After the war, it was also thought that female police officers might help to prevent indecent exposure and sexual assaults on children. The National Council of Women of Great Britain presented an appeal to the Parks Committee in 1924 for more police, particularly women police officers "in the interests of public morality and decency and particularly for the safeguarding of little children", complaining that the supervision of parks was inadequate, and citing several recent cases of "misconduct and indecency", particularly at Warley, Cannon Hill, Swanshurst and Sparkhill parks.

== See also ==
- Law enforcement in the United Kingdom
- List of defunct law enforcement agencies in the United Kingdom
