= Royal Anguilla Police Force =

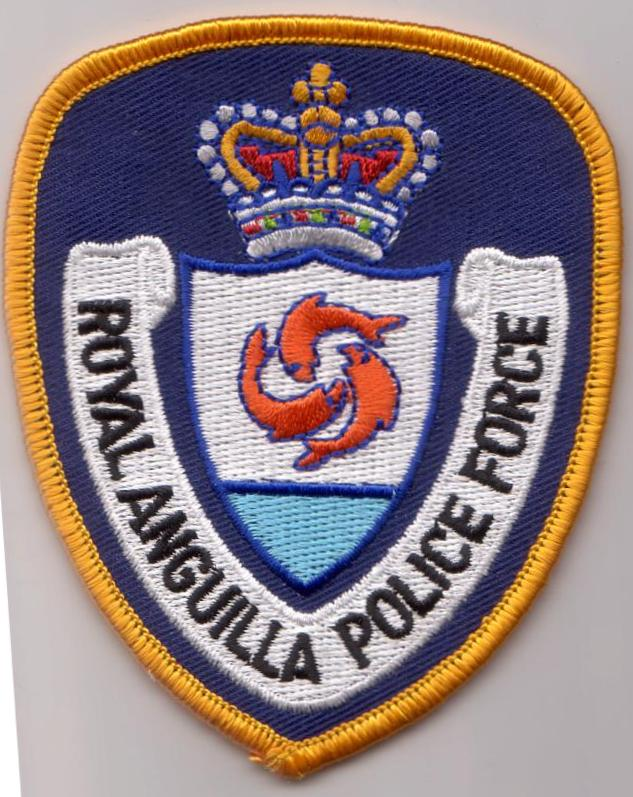
- Shoulder patch of the Royal Anguilla Police Force

- The crest of the Royal Anguilla Police Force

- Flag of Anguilla
- Abbreviation: RAPF

Agency overview
- Formed: 28 January 1972
- Employees: ~100

Jurisdictional structure
- National agency: Anguilla
- Operations jurisdiction: Anguilla
- Area: 91 square kilometres (35 sq mi)
- Population: 15,753 (2021 est.)
- Primary governing body: Government of Anguilla
- Secondary governing body: Governor of Anguilla
- General nature: Local civilian police

Operational structure
- Constables: ~100
- Agency executive: Robert Muir Clark, Commissioner of Police

Website
- Official Website Facebook Page

The Royal Anguilla Police Force (RAPF), known as the Anguilla Police Force until 1990, is the police force of Anguilla, a British Overseas Territory in the Caribbean.

== History ==
The Anguilla Police Force was formed on 28 January 1990, after Anguilla separated from Saint Christopher and Nevis. It received the "Royal" prefix from Queen Elizabeth II in 1990.

== Structure ==
The Royal Anguilla Police Force is headquartered in The Valley, Anguilla.

The majority of RAPF officers are recruited from Anguilla or the wider Caribbean region. Specialist officers from the United Kingdom including criminal investigators and firearms officers are also embedded in the RAPF, funded by the UK Foreign, Commonwealth & Development Office. This support was increased in May 2025.

The Commissioner of Police is often recruited from a force in the United Kingdom: from 2015 the force was led by Commissioner Paul Morrison who transferred from Sussex Police in England, and from January 2021 by David Lynch, also from Sussex Police. Since May 2023, it has been led by Robert Muir Clark, who came from the Police Service of Northern Ireland.

== Training ==
Recruits to the RAPF carry out internal training at the Anguilla Recruit Training Centre, which includes physical training, foot drill, and training on motor vehicle collisions. The recruits wear a uniform similar to RAPF constables, but they wear a baseball cap until they pass the training when they receive standard headdress.

Specialist training for RAPF officers is also provided by the United Kingdom and other British Overseas Territories; in June 2025, RAPF firearms instructors attended regional training delivered by UK police in Bermuda.

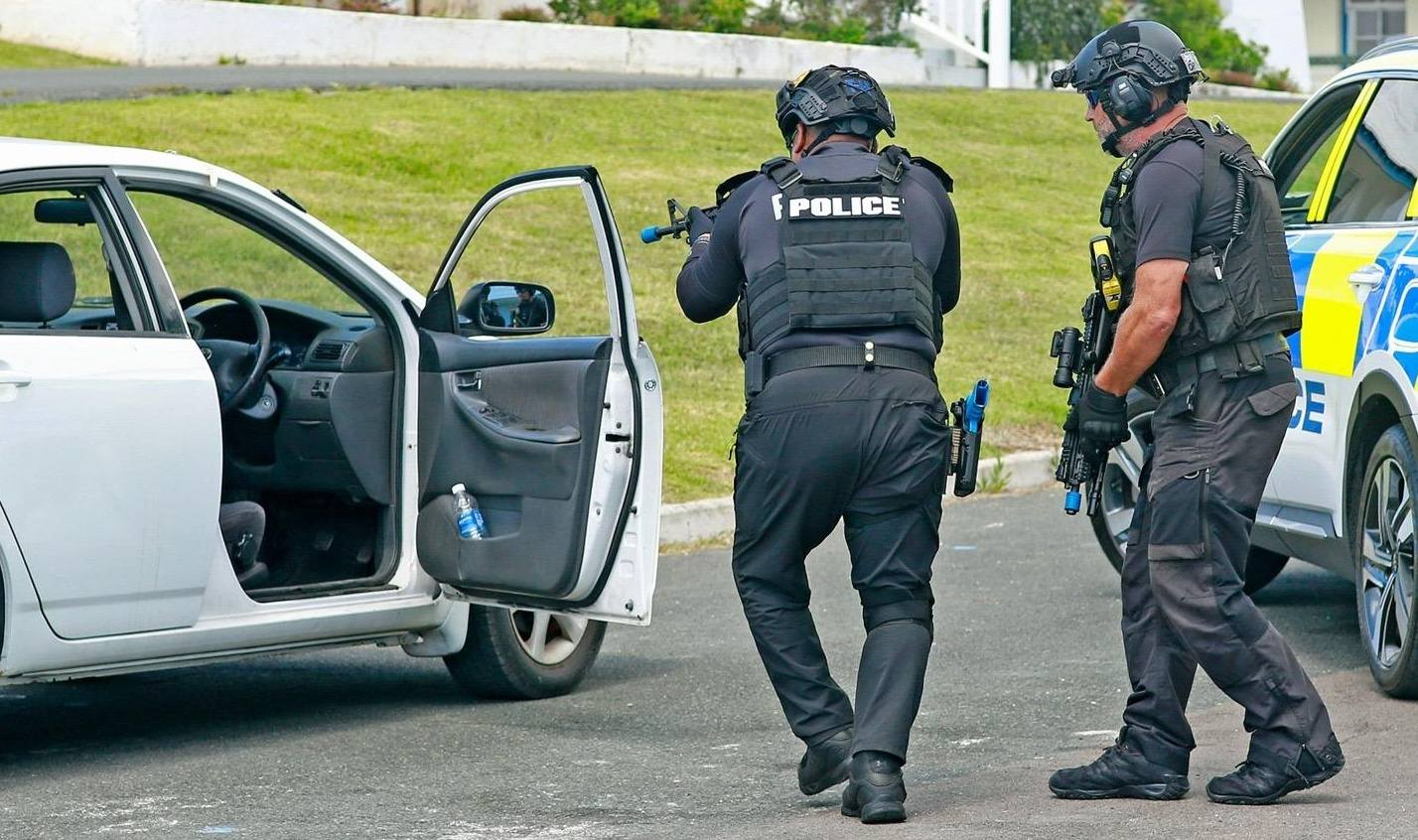
RAPF officers participating in firearms training in Bermuda

== Uniform ==
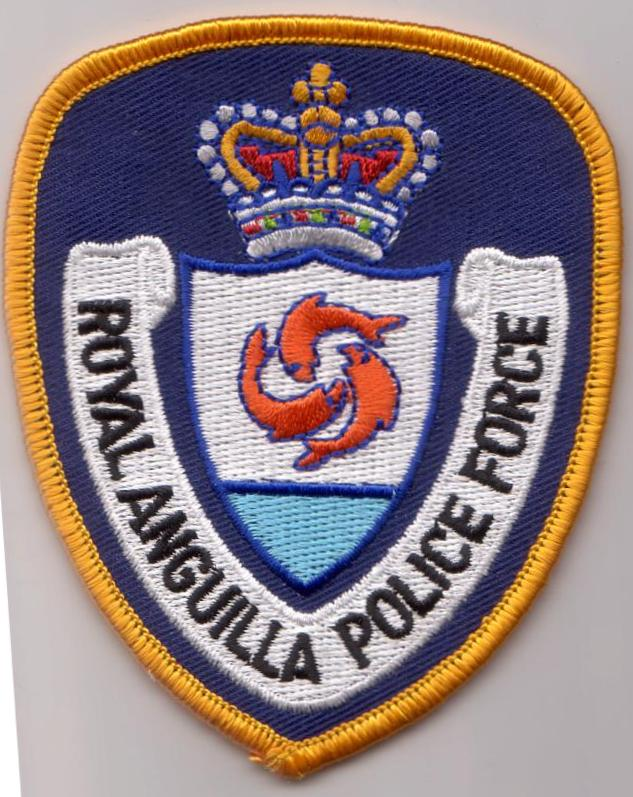
Royal Anguilla Police Force shoulder patch

=== Formal uniform ===
The formal uniform is for ceremonial, public duties and formal occasions (such as the arrival/departure of the Governor). This consists of:

==== Males ====
- Black tunic with closed collar, silver buttons and whistle on chain
- Black trousers with silver piping
- Black socks and black shoes
- White pith helmet with RAPF capbadge, chinstrap and spike in silver
- White belt with central clasp

Male officers with the rank of inspector and above, wear the tunic open at the collar, with a white shirt and black tie underneath. A Sam Browne belt in black is worn over the top and a swagger stick is carried underneath the arm. Peaked caps are worn by senior officers and may replace the pith helmet for junior officers.

==== Females ====
- Black tunic with closed collar, silver buttons and whistle on chain
- Black skirt with silver piping
- Black socks and black shoes
- White-topped bowler hats with RAPF capbadge
- White belt with central clasp

==== Insignia ====
All ranks wear rank insignia on their tunics and medal ribbons are worn on the left of the tunic, with full-sized medals for parades.

==== Arms ====
When on certain parades, No.4 Lee Enfield rifles are carried by junior ranks, with senior officers carrying a police sword.

=== Everyday uniform ===
The everyday uniform is worn for when the formal or operations uniform is not suitable. It consists of:

==== Males ====
- White shirt, with silver buttons and whistle
- Black trousers with silver piping
- Black belt & shoes

==== Females ====
- White shirt, with silver buttons and whistle
- Black skirt with silver piping and stockings
- Black belt and shoes

== Equipment ==
Following the British policing model, most RAPF officers are not routinely armed.
