= Guernsey Border Agency =

- Abbreviation: GBA

Agency overview
- Formed: 1975

Jurisdictional structure
- Operations jurisdiction: Guernsey, Alderney, Sark, Herm, GBG
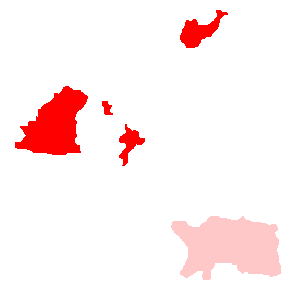
- Map of Guernsey Border Agency's jurisdiction
- Area: 78 km²
- Population: Approx 67,500
- Specialist jurisdictions: Customs, excise, gambling; Immigration

Operational structure
- Headquarters: Hospital Lane, St Peter Port
- Agency executive: Patrick Rice (Head of Law Enforcement), Chief Officer

Facilities
- Stations: 1

Website
- Website

The Guernsey Border Agency is the law enforcement body charged with tackling cross border crime and administering the customs and immigration systems for the Bailiwick of Guernsey. The agency is headed by a Chief Officer - Patrick Rice (Head of Law Enforcement)

The Agency has been established in shadow form following a decision to separate the executive functions of setting strategy and policy (which will be the responsibility of the Home Department and a law enforcement commission) and operational law enforcement. The island has had an integrated customs and immigration function since 1975. The new agency brings financial crime and drugs responsibilities to the new agency from the Guernsey Police.

The agency has around 90 officers and staff. It has a cutter and can call on mutual aid from French customs and UK Border Force aircraft and vessels if required.

The agency is based at New Jetty, White Rock, St Peter Port, Guernsey.

== Officers ==
The GBA is a uniformed force of customs officers who have powers of arrest, search and detention.

=== Uniform ===
Operational Uniform

The operational uniform consists of:

- black polo shirt
- black trousers
- black jacket
- high-visibility stab/equipment vests
- rank slides

Baseball caps and life jackets are worn for marine duties.

Service (formal) dress

The service dress (worn for court, parades, formal occasions etc.) is a classic British customs officer uniform, consisting of:

- Dark blue naval-style tunic/jacket
- Dark blue trousers
- White shirt
- Tie
- White-topped peaked cap (males) with GBA capbdage
- White-topped bowler cap (females) with GBA capbadge
- Polished suit shoes

=== Equipment ===
GBA officers do not carry firearms, but carry similar equipment to UK and Channel Island police and enforcement agencies:

- Baton
- Incapacitant spray
- Handcuffs
- Secure radio
- Torch

=== Pay ===
The Government website states that the pay for a Customs Officer (Grade 3) is:

Grade: 3 - £28,441 to £40,102
