= National Ballistics Intelligence Service =

UK intelligence service for firearm-related criminality

Agency overview
- Formed: 2008
- Headquarters: Birmingham, England, United Kingdom
- Website: nabis.police.uk

The National Ballistics Intelligence Service (NABIS) is a British intelligence service dedicated to managing and providing detailed information regarding firearm-related criminality. The service aims to use its database to store ballistics information about police cases involving firearms, and consequently maintain it for future use and reference. The service operates four facilities to test and analyse firearms evidence to help link it with other cases. These are based in Birmingham, London, Manchester and at Gartcosh in the Scottish Crime Campus in the town.

The service was officially launched on 1 April 2008 and can be roughly compared to the ATF in the United States.

NABIS is an independent national policing organisation that is hosted by West Midlands Police (WMP) for financial and legal purposes. Four regional forensic hubs operate within four host forces/organisations: Greater Manchester Police (GMP), West Midlands Police (WMP), Metropolitan Police Service (MPS) and the Glasgow unit of SPA Forensic Services. The staff are around 40 in number.

== See also ==
- British intelligence agencies
- National Police Chiefs' Council
- Police National Computer
