= Port of Portland Police (United Kingdom) =

British police force

- Badge of the Portland Port Police

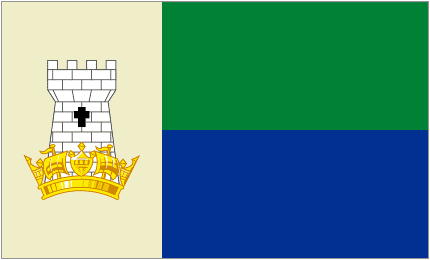
- Flag of the Isle of Portland

Jurisdictional structure
- Operations jurisdiction: UK
- Legal jurisdiction: Port of Portland and up to 1-mile (1.6 km) from boundary.
- Constituting instrument: Harbours, Docks and Piers Clauses Act 1847
- General nature: Civilian police

Facilities
- Stations: 1

Website
- www.portland-port.co.uk/portland+port+police

The Port of Portland Police is a non-Home Office ports police force responsible for the Port of Portland in Dorset, United Kingdom.

== History ==
The force was established in 1997 when the Portland Harbour Authority bought the port from the British Government. It is a body of constables attested under section 79 of the Harbours, Docks, and Piers Clauses Act 1847 (as incorporated by Portland Harbour Revision Order 1997). The Port Police staff the main entrance to the port 24 hours a day, year-round.

== Present day ==
In February 2018, four new constables were sworn in. In July 2020, the Port Police agreed a memorandum of understanding with the local police force, Dorset Police. This will involve the sharing of assets, improving communication and allowing the collation of information.

== Duties ==
The Port Police guard the main entrance to the port, 24 hours a day, all-year-round.

The Port Police are responsible for ensuring the security and safety of the port and its tenants, employees, users and visitors as well as the international ships visiting the port.

The Port of Portland has its own byelaws (Portland Port General Byelaws 2018) and these are enforced by the Port Police.

== Powers ==
All Port Police officers are sworn in as "special constables" under Section 79 of the Harbours, Docks, and Piers Clauses Act 1847 (HDPCA). The act uses the term 'special constable'; at the time this act was passed 'special constable' meant any constable who was not a member of a territorial police force.

As a result, officers have the full powers of a constable on "any land owned by the harbour, dock, or port and at any place within one mile of any owned land".

== Uniform ==
Portland Port Police officers wear a typical UK Port Police uniform.

- Black t-shirt or white shirt & black tie
- Black trousers
- Black jacket with police markings and rank slide
- Black boots
- Custodian helmet (males) with Portland Port Police helmet badge.
- Peaked cap with black and white checquered cap band and capbadge.

All officers have a "warrant card" which is used to identify their authority as constables.

== Rank structure ==
The rank structure of the Portland Port Police force is as follows:

Rank Structure of the Portland Port Police
Rank	Port police constable	Sergeant	Inspector
Insignia	UK Police Constable Epaulette	UK Patrol Sergeant Epaulette	UK Police Inspector Epaulette

== See also ==
- Law enforcement in the United Kingdom
- Port police
