= States of Jersey Customs and Immigration Service =

Agency overview
- Formed: 1 January 2005
- Preceding agencies: Customs and Excise; Immigration and Nationality

Jurisdictional structure
- Operations jurisdiction: Jersey
- Legal jurisdiction: Jersey

Operational structure
- Headquarters: Maritime House, La Route du Port Elizabeth, St. Helier
- Agency executive: Rhiannon Small, Head of Service

Website
- Official website

States of Jersey Customs and Immigration Service, formed from the amalgamation of the Customs & Excise Department (formerly known as the Bureau des Impôts) and the Immigration and Nationality Department holds one of the oldest government posts in Jersey. The post of Agent of the Impôts, now Head of Service, dates back to 1602.
