= National Vehicle Crime Intelligence Service =

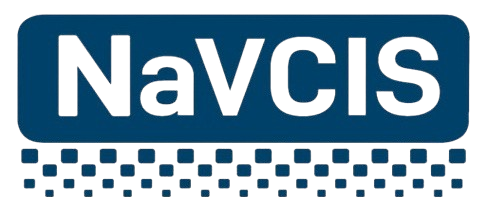
Official logo

The National Vehicle Crime Intelligence Service (NaVCIS), formerly known as the Association of Chief Police Officers Vehicle Crime Intelligence Service (AVCIS) is a British police unit.

Originally set up and run by the Association of Chief Police Officers, it is responsible for combating organised vehicle crime and the use of vehicles in crime. AVCIS was formed in 2006 to replace the vehicle crime related functions of the National Criminal Intelligence Service which was disbanded with the creation of the Serious Organised Crime Agency and is based in Warwickshire.

NaVCIS works with a number of other agencies and private companies to maintain the downward pressure on vehicle crime which saw it reduce by 50% between 2001 and 2010-11.

== See also ==
- National Police Chiefs' Council
