= National Counter Terrorism Security Office =

Police unit of the United Kingdom

The National Counter Terrorism Security Office (NaCTSO) is a police unit. It is funded by, and reports to, the Home Office, which advises the British government on its counter-terrorism strategy.

The National Counter Terrorism Security Office supports the protection of the United Kingdom's crowded spaces, hazardous and potentially vulnerable or at risk sites, as well as offering advice on a range of threats and dangerous substances. They work alongside the Centre for the Protection of National Infrastructure and Counter Terrorism Policing.

The National Counter Terrorism Security Office is also responsible for running National Counter Terrorism Security Advisers (CTSA's) network. National Counter Terrorism Security Advisers are embedded in police forces across the UK and provide direct support and guidance to help build the resilience (cf. also psychological resilience) and security of the United Kingdom from terrorist attacks.

== Publications ==
=== 2015 (six) ===
Target hardening of devices - (27 November 2015)

Online radicalization - (26 November 2015)

Industry preparedness - (25 November 2015)

Developing Dynamic Lockdown Procedures - (Published 18 November)

Recognising the terrorist threat - (Updated 21 July)

Terrorist incident in Tunisia - FCO guidance and assistance - (Published 27 June)

=== 2014 (thirteen) ===
NaCTSO moves to GOV.UK - (Published 27 November)

Counting the cost - (Published 25 November)

Protecting your business's assets - (Published 24 November)

Secure your fertilizer - (Published 24 November)

Secure hazardous materials to help prevent terrorism - (Published 24 November)

Counter-terrorism support for businesses and communities - (Published 24 November)

Business continuity planning - (Published 19 November)

Managing the risks from terrorism - (Published 19 November)

Securing hazardous materials - (Published 19 November)

Security of fertiliser storage on farms - (Published 14 November)

Protecting crowded places from terrorism - (Published 14 November)

Security considerations for requests to photograph sites - (Published 2 July)

Protecting crowded places: design and technical issues - (Published 16 April)

=== 2012 (six) ===
Security at general aviation airfields - (Published 19 November)

Dual-use chemicals: reminders for shops and suppliers - (Published 14 November)

Counter-terrorism advice for airports and airfields - (Published 1 November)

Security advice for pubs, clubs and bars - (Published 1 June)

Transport security - (Published 1 January)

Crowded places: the planning system and counter-terrorism - (Published 1 January)

=== 2011 (two) ===
Secure in the knowledge: building a secure business - (Published 17 January)

Counter terrorism protective security advice for your business outside the UK - (Published 1 January)

=== 2009 (four) - places of worship, major events, health, Higher and Further education ===
Counter terrorism protective security advice for places of worship - (Published 1 January)

Counter terrorism protective security advice for major events - (Published 1 January)

Counter terrorism protective security advice for health - (Published 1 January)

Counter terrorism protective security advice for Higher and Further Education - (Published 1 January)

=== 2008 (two) - hotels and restaurants & commercial centres ===
Counter terrorism protective security advice for hotels and restaurants - (Published 1 January)

Counter terrorism protective security advice for commercial centres - (Published 1 January)

Counter terrorism protective security advice for cinemas and theatres - (Published 1 January)

=== 2007 (two) - visitor attractions & bars, public houses and clubs ===
Counter terrorism protective security advice for visitor attractions - (Published 1 January)

Counter terrorism protective security advice for bars, pubs and clubs - (Published 1 January)

=== 2006 (two) - stadia and arenas & shopping centres ===
Counter terrorism protective security advice for stadia and arenas - (Published 1 January)

Counter terrorism protective security advice for shopping centres - (Published 1 January)

== See also ==
- Counter terrorism
