= National Wildlife Crime Unit =

The National Wildlife Crime Unit (NWCU) is a British national police unit that gathers intelligence on wildlife crime and provides analytical and investigative support to law enforcement agencies.

== History ==
The idea was first piloted in 2002 and the unit initially functioned as a department within the National Criminal Intelligence Service.

The NWCU was officially launched on 18 October 2006 as a standalone police-led Unit and tasked with targeting and disrupting serious wildlife crime, such as the illegal import of rare species. According to then Minister for Biodiversity Barry Gardiner, its role was to tackle an "illegal billion-pound industry".

In 2016, the fate of the agency became uncertain, following a lack of commitment from the Government to include it in the budget documents following a spending review by then Chancellor of the Exchequer George Osborne. Following several months of uncertainty and speculation, during which numerous conservationists and environmental organisations petitioned the British government regarding the agency's survival, the Home Office and the Department for Environment Food and Rural Affairs announced a four-year funding period for the National Wildlife Crime Unit, securing its long-term future.

It operated from London during its time in the National Criminal Intelligence Services before moving to the old police station Livingston, Scotland in 2006, where it would remain for the next 10 years of its existence. That building was due for redevelopment and in September 2016, the NWCU relocated to Stirling, which is also in Scotland.

== Structure ==
The NWCU is made up of 15 staff members, including analysts, intelligence officers and investigative support officers from the police, Her Majesty's Revenue and Customs, the Department for Environment, Food and Rural Affairs, and TRAFFIC International. The NWCU can also support local investigations when specialist support is necessary.

The funding for the NWCU comes jointly from the Home Office and the Department for Environment.

== Functions ==
The United Kingdom has some of the most stringent wildlife controls anywhere in the world when it comes to illegal wildlife trading. The NWCU deals with the trade in endangered species, illegal taxidermy and auction sales, bat and badger-related offences, marine species, reptile smuggling, wild bird netting, egg collecting, animal health issues and dangerous wild animals.

== See also ==
- Wildlife liaison officer
- National Police Chiefs' Council
- Wildlife and Countryside Act 1981
- Animal welfare in the United Kingdom
- Royal Society for the Prevention of Cruelty to Animals
- Scottish Society for Prevention of Cruelty to Animals
