= Police National Computer =

UK database of criminal, driving and property records

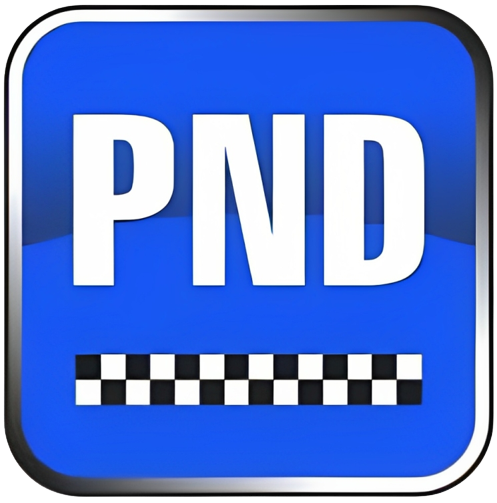
The logo for the Police National Database software used by members of British law enforcement.

The Police National Computer (PNC) is a crime information center and database used by members of the United Kingdom law enforcement and other non-law enforcement agencies, maintained by the Criminal Records Office (ACRO) under the governance of the National Police Chiefs' Council. Originally developed in the early 1970s, PNC1 went "live" in 1974, providing UK police forces with online access to the lost/stolen vehicle database. The vehicle owners application quickly followed, giving the police online access to the names/addresses of every vehicle owner in the UK.

The PNC started holding nominal information based on the computerisation of criminal records held by the Metropolitan Police and other police forces in the late 1970s. These records could be accessed online in real-time by all UK police forces via the "Names" applications. It now consists of several databases available 24 hours a day, giving access to information of national and local matters. As of 18 January 2021, Kit Malthouse said that there are 13 million person records, 58.5 million driver records, and 62.6 million vehicle records stored on the PNC. The PNC is currently the responsibility of the Home Office. Between 2007 and 2012, it was maintained by the National Policing Improvement Agency (NPIA) which inherited the activities of the now disbanded Police Information Technology Organisation (PITO). It is to be decommissioned upon the expiry of its current support contract in March 2026, being replaced by the Law Enforcement Data Service (LEDS) system.

== History ==
In 1969, the National Police Computer was set to be launched in 1972. Another government computer system was the GPO National Data Processing System, set up in 1969.

Since its inception in 1974, the PNC has undergone numerous changes that were gradually introduced. The most notable was the introduction of the Phoenix (Police and Home Office Enhanced Names Index) in 1995. This format has been retained to the present day.

The PNC is based on a Fujitsu BS2000/OSD SE700 mainframe and developed in ADABAS, with recent PNC applications held on UNIX servers. There are around 26,000 directly connected terminals and 25,000 terminals that are connected via local police force computer systems. The mainframe is connected to the end user in several ways: for high volume users (i.e., other police forces) via secure IP network; for low volume users, a secure dial-up link is provided by Cable & Wireless. Another connection method is via an X.25 packet-switched network; this method is being phased out. Databases for vehicles and driving licences are copied from the DVLA databases in the early morning; there is no service loss when an update is in progress. The mainframe server is located at the Hendon Data Centre with back-up servers located around the UK.

In 2005, the only back-up server was located next to Hertfordshire Oil Storage Terminal in Buncefield, which was the scene of a major civil emergency when it burned to the ground in December 2005. According to the Home Office, the location had been assessed as low-risk notwithstanding that the site was 100 yards (91 m) from a disaster hazard.

== Users ==
Requests for access to PNC are decided upon by the PNC Information Access Panel (PIAP). The members of the panel are the National Police Chiefs' Council (NPCC), the Association of Police Authorities, and the Home Office. Delegated or subcontracted users exist.

Organisations with full access:

- All territorial police forces of Great Britain
- Police Service of Northern Ireland (PSNI)
- British Transport Police (BTP)
- Civil Nuclear Constabulary
- Isle of Man Constabulary
- States of Jersey Police
- States of Guernsey Police Service
- National Identification Service (NIS)
- National Crime Agency (NCA)
- Serious Fraud Office (SFO)
- Ministry of Defence Police (MDP)
- HM Revenue & Customs
- Security Service (MI5)
- Secret Intelligence Service (MI6)
- Government Communications Headquarters (GCHQ)
- Defence Intelligence Staff
- Department for Work and Pensions
- National Police Chiefs' Council (NPCC)

Other organisations have restricted access to names file only.

- HM Courts & Tribunals Service
- Probation Service
- Criminal Records Bureau
- Royal Military Police
- Royal Air Force Police
- Royal Navy Police
- Royal Marines Police

PIAP has defined the following organisations as non-police and has agreed that authorised users within these organisations may have names file only access commensurate with their previously stated and agreed business needs.

Non-police organisations with access to PNC:

Non-Police Organisation	Read and write access	Read-only access	Access to PHOENIX/names index
Access Northern Ireland	-	✓	✓
Belfast Harbour Police	Unknown	Unknown	Unknown
Belfast International Airport Constabulary	Unknown	Unknown	Unknown
Cambridge University Constabulary	Unknown	Unknown	Unknown
Canterbury Cathedral Close Constables	Unknown	Unknown	Unknown
Charity Commission for England and Wales	-	✓	✓
Chester Cathedral Constables	Unknown	Unknown	Unknown
Children and Family Court Advisory and Support Service	-	✓	✓
Civil Nuclear Constabulary	-	✓	✓
College of Policing	-	✓	✓
Competition and Markets Authority	-	✓	✓
Criminal Cases Review Commission	-	✓	✓
Defence Vetting Agency	Unknown	Unknown	Unknown
Department for Business, Innovation, Science and Trade	Unknown	Unknown	Unknown
Department for Environment, Food and Rural Affairs	Unknown	Unknown	Unknown
Department for Transport	Unknown	Unknown	Unknown
Department for Work and Pensions	-	✓	✓
Disclosure and Barring Service	-	✓	✓
Disclosure Scotland	-	✓	✓
Driver and Vehicle Licensing Agency	-	✓	-
Driver and Vehicle Standards Agency	-	✓	✓
Environment Agency	-	✓	✓
Epping Forest Keepers	Unknown	Unknown	Unknown
Falmouth Docks Police	Unknown	Unknown	Unknown
Financial Conduct Authority	-	✓	✓
Foreign, Commonwealth and Development Office	Unknown	Unknown	Unknown
Gangmasters and Labour Abuse Authority	-	✓	✓
G4S	Unknown	Unknown	Unknown
Hampstead Heath Constabulary	Unknown	Unknown	Unknown
Health and Safety Executive	-	✓	✓
His Majesty's Inspectorate of Constabulary and Fire & Rescue Services	-	✓	✓
His Majesty's Prison Service	-	✓	✓
His Majesty's Revenue and Customs	✓	-	✓
National Highways	✓	-	-
Hillingdon Parks Patrol Service	Unknown	Unknown	Unknown
Home Office	✓	-	✓
House of Commons	-	✓	✓
House of Lords	-	✓	✓
Independent Office for Police Conduct	-	✓	✓
Kew Constabulary	Unknown	Unknown	Unknown
Larne Harbour Police	Unknown	Unknown	Unknown
Liverpool Cathedral Constables	Unknown	Unknown	Unknown
Marine Management Organisation	-	✓	✓
Medicines and Healthcare products Regulatory Agency	-	✓	✓
Mersey Tunnels Police	-	✓	✓
Ministry of Justice (Jury Vetting)	-	✓	✓
Ministry of Justice (Warrant Enforcement)	✓	-	✓
National Air Traffic Services	-	✓	✓
National Assembly for Wales	-	✓	✓
NHS Counter Fraud and Security Management Service Division	-	✓	✓
Natural Resources Wales	-	✓	✓
Office for Civil Nuclear Security	Unknown	Unknown	Unknown
Office of Fair Trading	Unknown	Unknown	Unknown
Parks Police Service	Unknown	Unknown	Unknown
Port of Bristol Police	Unknown	Unknown	Unknown
Port of Dover Police	Unknown	Unknown	Unknown
Port of Felixstowe Police	Unknown	Unknown	Unknown
Port of Liverpool Police	-	✓	✓
Port of Portland Police	Unknown	Unknown	Unknown
Port of Tilbury Police	-	✓	✓
Post Office	-	✓	✓
Royal Mail	✓	-	✓
Scottish Society for the Prevention of Cruelty to Animals	-	✓	✓
Serious Fraud Office	✓	-	✓
States of Jersey Customs and Immigration Service	-	✓	✓
Tees and Hartlepool Port Authority Harbour Police	Unknown	Unknown	Unknown
The Insolvency Service	-	✓	✓
Thurrock Council	-	✓	✓
Trading Standards	-	✓	✓
UK Security Vetting	-	✓	✓
UK Visas and Immigration	Unknown	Unknown	Unknown
Vehicle and Operator Services Agency	Unknown	Unknown	Unknown
Wandsworth Parks and Events Police	Unknown	Unknown	Unknown
York Minster Police	Unknown	Unknown	Unknown

== Databases ==
PNC contains several separate databases; these include:

- Names File: This contains a large amount of information about people who have been convicted, cautioned or recently arrested (referred to as "nominals" on the PNC). This includes links to fingerprints and DNA. (The PNC is a text-only computer so no graphical information is stored; photos that are taken while in custody have information relating to their location so enquiries can be made to obtain a copy of them.) Nominals can be placed on the PNC as "Wanted/Missing" if they are sought in connection with a crime, on warrant and failed to appear at court, AWOL from military service or reported missing. All recent previous arrests and convictions will appear on PNC as well as any impending offences; full disposal history is also included, which shows the sentence handed down for each offence. Numerous other items of information are also stored, including all previous addresses, co-defendants, local intelligence, marks/scars and descriptions.
- Vehicle File: Provides details on the registered keepers of motor vehicles, as well as storing other information from the DVLA as to vehicles' statuses (Tax Expired, V23 Submitted, Stolen, Chassis Number, Engine Number etc.). Certain reports can be added by the police that relate to the vehicle or occupant status; examples include whether the occupants are believed to be involved in crime or are missing, whether the vehicle is stolen, and whether the vehicle is believed to be cloned. The vehicle record system is currently linked to the Motor Insurance Database (maintained by the Motor Insurers Bureau), which can confirm whether insurance policies are on vehicles, and the details of these policies such as named drivers, policy dates, policy number and insurance company. The Vehicle Operator Services Agency (VOSA) has computerised the MOT; as a result, a link has been created to the PNC, which shows the expiration date of the MOT tests for vehicles. The vehicle file actually contains two separate databases (that show on a single screen), one of which is updated and controlled by the DVLA, and the second part is the responsibility of the police (including vehicle reports, to which the DVLA does not have access).
- Property File: Certain types of stolen and found property can be placed onto the PNC system. These are recorded under the following categories: Trailers (including sidecars), Plant (non-DVLA-registered agricultural and construction machinery), Engines (those that do not fall under other categories), Animal (registered animals), Marine Craft, and Firearms (including imitation firearms).
- Drivers File: This recently added database contains information on 48 million people who either hold driving licences or are disqualified from holding them. The record contains information relating to test passes, endorsements and the licence entitlements. This database is the responsibility of the DVLA and is updated every morning.

PNC operators undergo initial training to operate the system, which usually consists of a five-day course to view data and conduct simple queries. Further courses are available to expand users' access level to update and conduct more in-depth queries. Penalties for misuse of the PNC and unlawful access of data are severe; it will likely lead to dismissal and sometimes a court appearance for breaching the Data Protection Act 1998.

A number of criminal justice partners are linked to the PNC, giving them access to the information held on the computer. About 5,000 checks are made each week through the "Jurors" link, which allows Crown Courts to check whether proposed jurors have criminal records. Previously, the Courts Service struggled to meet its target of randomly checking 20 per cent of potential jury members.

With the growth of trans-national criminality, the PNC was linked to the Schengen Information System (SIS), which shares certain information Europe-wide. This is no longer the case since the UK left the European Union in 2020.

The Police National Computer is one of the main sources of information accessed when a Disclosure and Barring Service check is made. It holds indefinite records of convictions and cautions, which are revealed in Disclosure and Barring Service checks. While of use in informing prospective employers as to the suitability of applicants for particular jobs, the information disclosed can show information that applicants may think is of no relevance, such as a juvenile conviction for shoplifting. Concerns have been expressed that the indefinite retention of old convictions and cautions is unwarranted.

Because of changes to legislation on 29 May 2013, DBS removed certain specified old and minor offences from criminal record certificates issued from this date. The filtering rules and the list of offences that will never be filtered are available on the DBS website.

A major data loss was discovered in January 2021, and a UK Home Office press release at the time provides information on the extent of the loss and the work to restore the data.

=== Impact Nominal Index ===
In 2002, IMPACT delivered a tactical, complementary service to the PNC, called the Impact Nominal Index (INI).

=== Police National Database ===
Delivery of the PND (Police National Database) was the first recommendation of the Bichard report. Contractor Logica was awarded a contract of £75-million to build and deliver the PND in 2007, but this was not commenced until May 2010 when the first forces began to load their data on to the new system. In November 2010, Northumbria Police became the first force to connect to the PND and to begin to use the new system. From June 2011, all Home Office forces were connected and using the PND.

PND is not a replacement for PNC; as of 2023 it holds 2 billion searchable records, and captures data from 220 different systems from 53 contributing police forces and law enforcement agencies. It is operated by the Canadian company CGI Group on behalf of the Home Office. CGI bought the original PND operator, Logica, in 2012.

The Police National Database aims to:

- Safeguard children and vulnerable people;
- Counter terrorism; and
- Prevent and disrupt serious organized crime.

As of 26 July 2016, the Police National Database reportedly stored 20 million images.

== Future of the PNC ==
In 2016, it was announced that the PNC would be decommissioned at the same time as the PND contract expired in 2019 and, under the guise of the National Law Enforcement Data Programme, a replacement would combine both systems, for the first time merging intelligence and conviction history against one nominal record. The National Law Enforcement Data Service would provide a less police-centric platform servicing all public enforcement agencies, including Border Force, HM Revenue and Customs, the Driver and Vehicle Licensing Agency and the Charity Commission.

In order to ensure that only relevant data are visible to each agency, user-based access controls will limit the segments of records that an agency can access to the very minimum they require to achieve their aims. The LEDS system was in advanced development in 2024, with the PNC due to be decommissioned upon the expiry of its support contract in March 2026.

== Public right of access ==
Any person now has the right to view their PNC record, if any, online or via post, free at www.acro.police.uk. This is done online where the user presents a list of addresses for the previous 10 years and an upload of an ID document, but this can also be presented offline. The results can be sent by either post or email.

These data are separate to any data a local force may hold on an individual – e.g., statements, summons files and traffic fixed penalties. This information can be requested through the relevant local force through a Subject Access Request under the Data Protection Act 2018.

== See also ==
- Crimint
- United Kingdom National DNA Database
- National Ballistics Intelligence Service
- Aerial roof markings
- Canadian Police Information Centre, Canadian equivalent law enforcement database
- National Crime Information Center, American equivalent of the PNC
