= Royal Borough of Kensington and Chelsea Parks Police =

Law enforcement for parks and open spaces

- Coat of arms of the Royal Borough of Kensington and Chelsea

Agency overview
- Formed: 1991 (original), 2019 (re-formed)
- Preceding agency: Parks Police Service (2013–2019)

Jurisdictional structure
- Operations jurisdiction: England, UK
- Legal jurisdiction: parks within Kensington and Chelsea
- Governing body: Royal Borough of Kensington and Chelsea, Community Safety Department
- Constituting instrument: Section 18, Ministry of Housing and Local Government Provisional Order Confirmation (Greater London Parks and Open Spaces) Act 1967
- General nature: Local civilian police

Operational structure
- Headquarters: Parks Police Service, The Stable Yard, Holland Park
- Constables: 11 (2 Sergeants, 9 constables)
- Parent agency: RBKC Community Safety Department

Facilities
- Stations: 1
- Cars: Toyota

Website
- https://www.rbkc.gov.uk/leisure-and-culture/parks-police-service

The Royal Borough of Kensington and Chelsea Parks Police is a body of constables responsible for policing the parks and open spaces of the London Borough of Kensington and Chelsea. In 2013, it was merged with the Hammersmith and Fulham Parks Constabulary to form the Parks Police Service. Then, in July 2019 The Royal Borough of Kensington and Chelsea Parks Police moved away from The London Borough of Hammersmith and Fulham Parks Constabulary, once again becoming a single service.

== Organisation and Duties ==
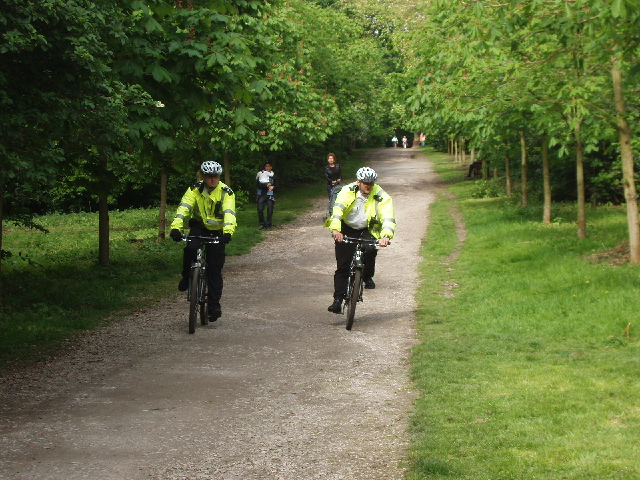
RBKC Parks Police patrol on bicycles in Holland Park

The Royal Borough of Kensington and Chelsea Parks Police is part of the Community Safety Department of the Kensington and Chelsea London Borough Council and provides a uniformed body of constables across the twenty-five parks and open spaces in the Royal Borough of Kensington and Chelsea, to detect and deter crime.

=== Officers ===
The Parks Police consists of two Sergeants (one of whom is the Principal Officer of RBKC Parks Police) and nine Constables.

The two Sergeants report to the RBKC Council Senior Community Safety Officer.

Their specific duties include:

- reporting crime within the parks
- dealing with anti-social behaviour
- detaining offenders
- enforcing bye-laws and the dog control public spaces protection orders
- security at park events
- dog chipping and dog shows
- attending park user group meetings
- crime prevention
- lost property in parks
- truancy patrols.

Applicants considered to be Parks Police Constables are expected to have previous experience as an attested constable (regular officer or Special Constable) with a Home Office force, British Transport Police or the now disbanded Royal Parks Constabulary.

== Powers ==
Members of the constabulary are sworn in as constables under Article 18 of the Ministry of Housing and Local Government Provisional Order Confirmation (Greater London Parks and Open Spaces) Act 1967, meaning they have powers of a constable to deal with bye-laws relating to parks and open spaces under their control.

The Act states:

"A local authority may procure officers appointed by them, for securing the observance of the provisions of all enactments relating to open spaces under their control, or management and of the byelaws and regulations made thereunder to be sworn in as constables for that purpose but any such officer shall not act as a constable unless in uniform, or provided with a warrant." (Emphasis added).

Article 19 goes on to state:

"Any constable, or any officer of a local authority, authorised in writing to enforce byelaws having effect in relation to an open space and any person called to the assistance of such constable, or officer may, without other warrant than this order, seize and detain any person committing, or having committed, any offence against such byelaws whose name or residence is unknown to and cannot be ascertained by such officer or constable and take him to a police station or before a justice to be dealt with according to law:... ". (Emphasis added).

Effectively, this Act gives RBKC Parks Police Constables powers to arrest any person, whom they suspect has broken the park byelaws and who cannot provide them with his/her name and address.

They are warranted constables providing a police service, and as such have powers of arrest, power to seize illicit drugs, and authority to carry police weapons (such as batons).

=== Arrests ===
In 2008, the constabulary made 30 arrests, mainly for possession of drugs, minor thefts and antisocial behaviour.

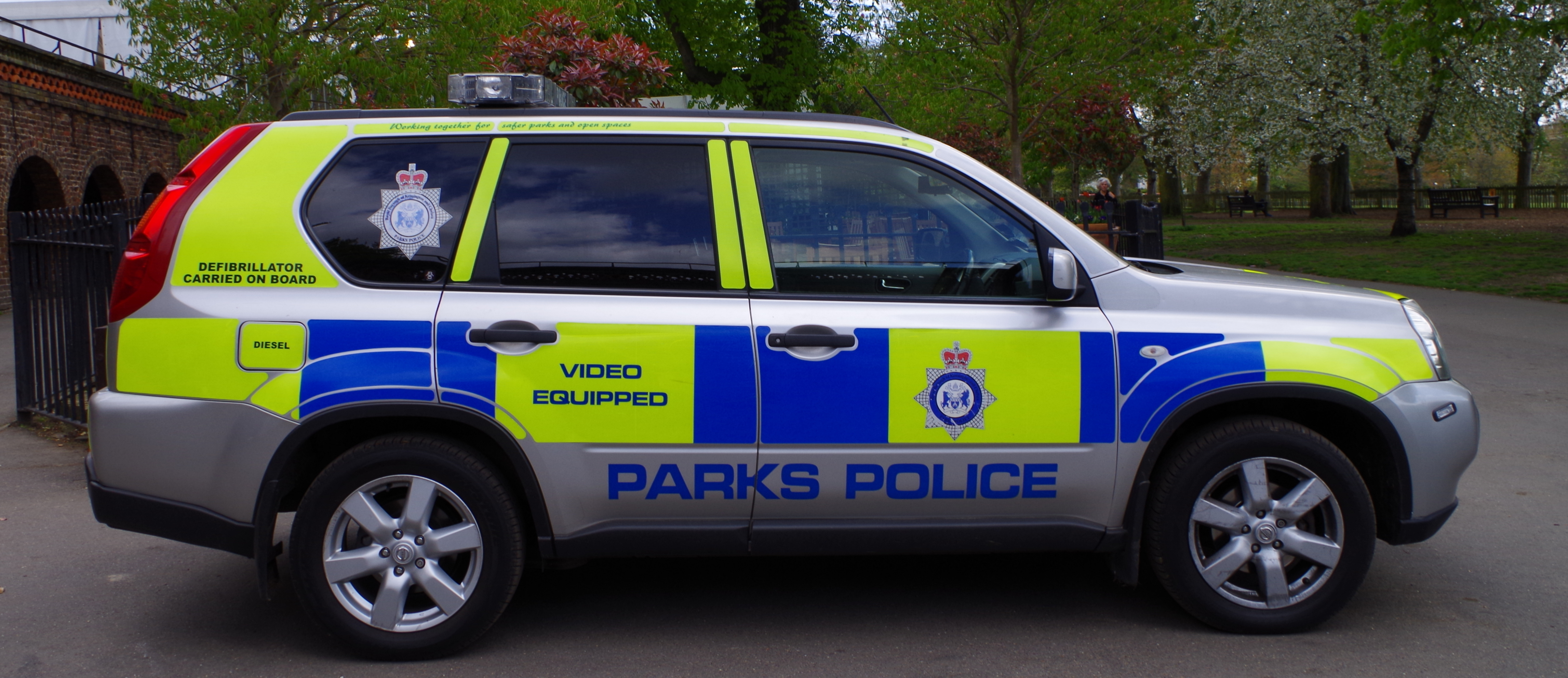
RBKC Parks Police Nissan X-Trail, equipped with video and defibrillator

== Uniform and Equipment ==
The Constables wear a typical British police uniform, which includes:

- white shirt
- black tie (male) or cravat (female)
- dark blue or black trousers
- black peaked cap with black and white chequered capband with RBKC Parks Police capbadge (male)
- black bowler cap with black and white chequered capband with RBKC Parks Police capbadge (female)
- black or dark blue trousers
- black stab vest with RBKC Parks Police logo and wording
- high-visibility jackets.

All constables have and wear a collar number when in uniform, which is on their epaulettes in operational dress.

=== Equipment ===
Park Police constables are warranted constables and therefore carry expandable batons (Monadnock Autolock) , as well as rigid handcuffs, radios, body worn video-cameras, K9 dog spray and other police equipment.

Parks Police use motor vehicles and pedal cycles to patrol, as well as carrying out usual foot patrols.

In 2021, the Parks Police introduced two new vehicles:

- BMW Hybrid vehicle
- Nissan Electric vehicle

both liveried with yellow-and-blue Battenburg markings and equipped with blue lights.

As of 2025, the Parks Police have one vehicle:

- A Toyota BZ4X fully electric vehicle, marked up in battenburg with blue roof and grille lights, public address system and siren.

== Ranks ==
There are two ranks within the RBKC Parks Police.

Sergeant	PS Epaulette
Parks Constable	PC Epaulette

== Relationship with other police ==
The parks are not a separate police area and as such are part of the Metropolitan Police District. Therefore, the Metropolitan Police are ultimately statutorily responsible for policing the parks and the investigation of crime committed within them. The RBKC Parks Police between 2013 and 2019 was merged with the Hammersmith and Fulham Parks Constabulary.

== See also ==
- Law enforcement in the United Kingdom
- List of law enforcement agencies in the United Kingdom, Crown Dependencies and British Overseas Territories
- Hammersmith and Fulham Parks Constabulary
