= York Minster Police =

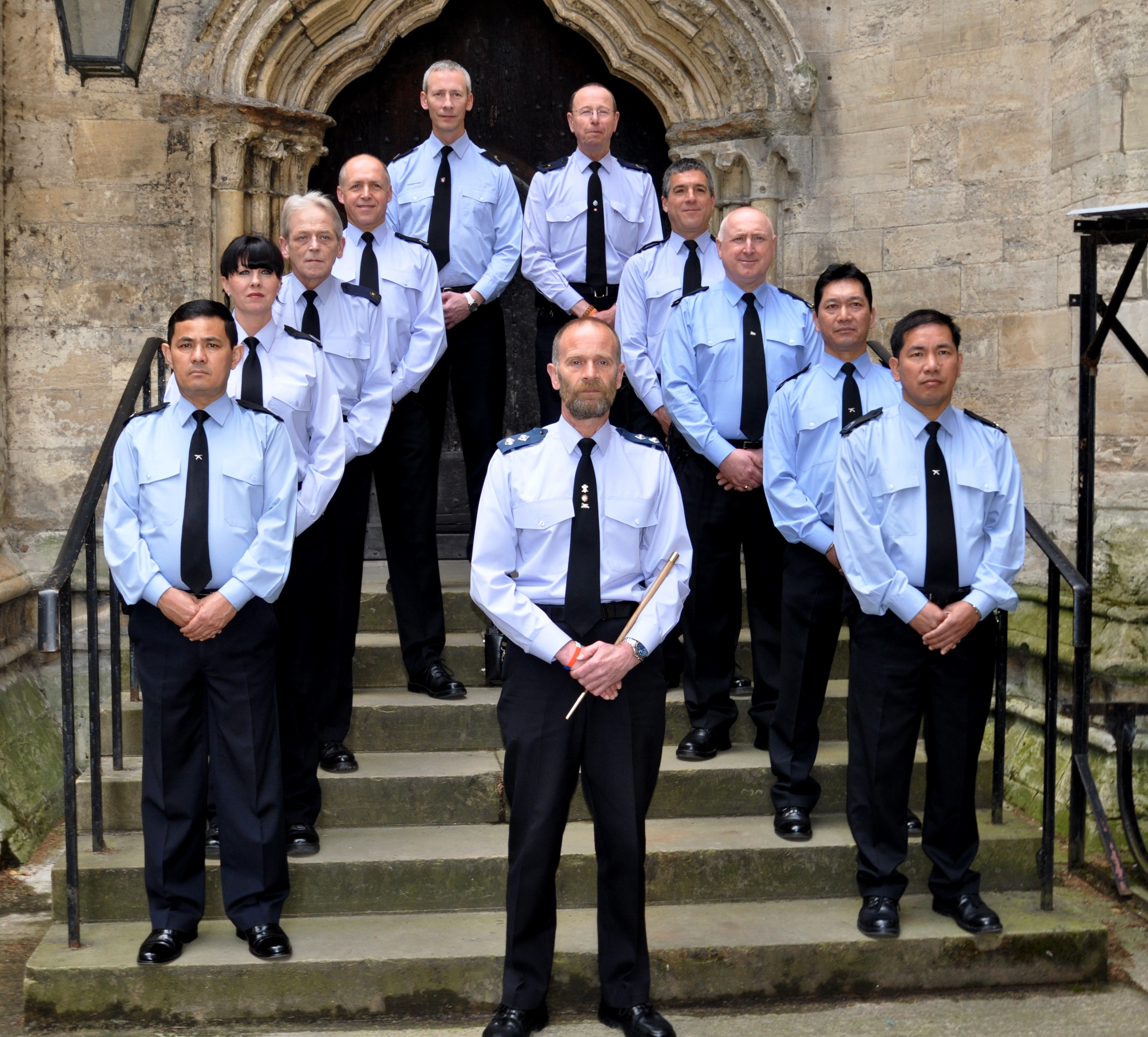
- The York Minster Police in 2010

- Badge of the York Minster Police

Agency overview
- Formed: 13th Century (1275), re-attested 2017

Jurisdictional structure
- Operations jurisdiction: Cathedral and Metropolitical Church of Saint Peter in York (York Minster), England, UK
- Legal jurisdiction: York Minster and adjoining Precincts
- Governing body: York Minster
- General nature: Local civilian police

Operational structure
- Agency executive: Mark Sutcliffe, Inspector of Cathedral Police and Head of Security (Chief Police Officer)

Facilities
- Stations: 1

York Minster Police is a small, specialised cathedral constabulary responsible for security in York Minster and its precincts in York, United Kingdom.

== History ==
The Liberty of St Peter and Peter Prison was formed in 1106, and appointed its own officers (including constables) independently of the city of York. Following the Minster fire in 1829, the Chapter of the cathedral ordered that "Henceforward a watchman/constable shall be employed to keep watch every night in and about the cathedral", and bemoaned the lack of one previously.

The Liberty was abolished in 1839, as a result of which any constables appointed for the Liberty would have been transferred to the new municipal borough of the city of York, and as the liberty ceased to exist it could no longer appoint constables. It is then that the first record is available of the employment of Thomas Marshall as a watchman, which lasted until 1854 at the salary of forty-one pounds and twelve shillings per year. The title of "Minster Police" was first recorded in 1855, when William Gladin replaced Marshall. Gladin lived at 2 Precentor's Court, adjacent to the Minster.

== Present day ==
There are now ten officers, two wardens and one sergeant, of the Minster Police. In addition to their policing role, the officers are the custodians of over 380 sets of keys, provide information and directions to tourists, oversee fire safety, and security for the movement of cash around the Minster. The local territorial police force, North Yorkshire Police retains primacy of policing throughout the county including York Minster, being responsible for the investigation of all crime and leading on all major or serious incidents.

=== Powers ===
In February 2017 it was reported that the Minster Police would be "given back powers of arrest after 80 years" by ITV News. A former territorial experienced police officer was brought in to update the constables on their power and training and the Minster Police "can deal with situations appropriately at the right level". A ceremony was reported to take place in the Spring to mark this change.

The BBC News website reported that: "Powers were returned to the force following the signing of a memorandum of understanding between the Chapter of York and the Chief Constable of North Yorkshire [Police]. The memorandum recognises that although security provision inside the minster and its precinct remain the responsibility of cathedral constables, North Yorkshire Police will be responsible for investigating all crime.

Any arrested people are handed over to North Yorkshire Police for transport and processing and the force will be responsible for the submission of prosecution files. The Minster Police constabulary is thought to be the oldest continuing police service in the country".

All officers have completed the Level 3 Certificate in Cathedral Constable Attestation.

== Uniform and equipment ==
The uniform consists of white and blue shirts, black ties (for men), black and white cravats (for women) black pull-over jumpers, yellow high-visibility jackets, black boots and a peaked cap with blue and white Sillitoe tartan or "dicing" as a cap-band. Female officers also wear this peaked cap, as opposed to the bowler cap which is worn by many British and Overseas Territories female officers. Officers can also wear a stab vest with "YORK MINSTER POLICE" written on the back, to easily identify them as such. Rank slides are worn on the shoulders of the shirt, jumper and vest. They wear numerals on their epaulettes together with the Minster's crest of crossed keys surmounted by a crown and "YORK MINSTER POLICE" wording.

There is also a dark blue police tunic to be worn over the shirt, for more formal occasions or day-to-day policing. If the constable has been awarded any decorations (medals) then their ribbons should be worn on the left breast of the tunic.

Officers carry radios (walkie-talkies) and can use earpieces.

=== Ranks ===
York Minster police ranks
Rank	Inspector; Formerly Head Constable	Sergeant; Formerly Senior Constable	Constable	Warden
Insignia				

== Numbers ==
The force is one of only seven cathedral forces in the world and the Minster Police includes two female Constables. The Minster Police comprises ten Cathedral Constables and one Police Sergeant. There are also two unsworn Police Wardens.

== See also ==
- Liverpool Cathedral Constables
- Canterbury Cathedral Close Constables
- Chester Cathedral Constables
- Cathedral constable
- Law enforcement in the United Kingdom
- List of law enforcement agencies in the United Kingdom
