= Washington National Cathedral Police =

Private police force

Protestant Episcopal Cathedral Foundation Police National Cathedral Police
- Flag of the District of Columbia
- Abbreviation: PECF Police

Jurisdictional structure
- Operations jurisdiction: Washington D.C., District of Columbia, United States
- Legal jurisdiction: District of Columbia
- General nature: Civilian police

Operational structure
- Officers: 20 Members
- Parent agency: Protestant Episcopal Cathedral Foundation

The Protestant Episcopal Cathedral Foundation Police (PECF Police), commonly known as the National Cathedral Police is a private police force responsible for security policing functions of the Protestant Episcopal Cathedral Foundation, which primarily consists of the Washington National Cathedral in Washington, DC, in the United States. The 57-acre grounds of the National Cathedral include three schools (Beauvoir, St. Albans School, and the Cathedral school), a parish church, places of religious study, the bishop's house and administration, plus assorted other buildings, gardens and playing fields. The police agency numbers around 20 members, who are licensed as special police officers by the Metropolitan Police Department of the District of Columbia, all sworn members carry firearms (and other police equipment), and may exercise full police powers when on Cathedral Foundation property or off-property when in "fresh pursuit" of suspects.

== Functions ==
The main functions of the National Cathedral Police, in addition to public safety, are protection details with other law enforcement agencies, traffic control, school safety assignments, and community oriented policing. and the force works closely with both the Metropolitan Police and federal agencies when planning major state events, such as the funeral of President Ronald Reagan. The Protestant Episcopal Cathedral Foundation was chartered by President Benjamin Harrison on January 6, 1893.

== Powers and authority ==
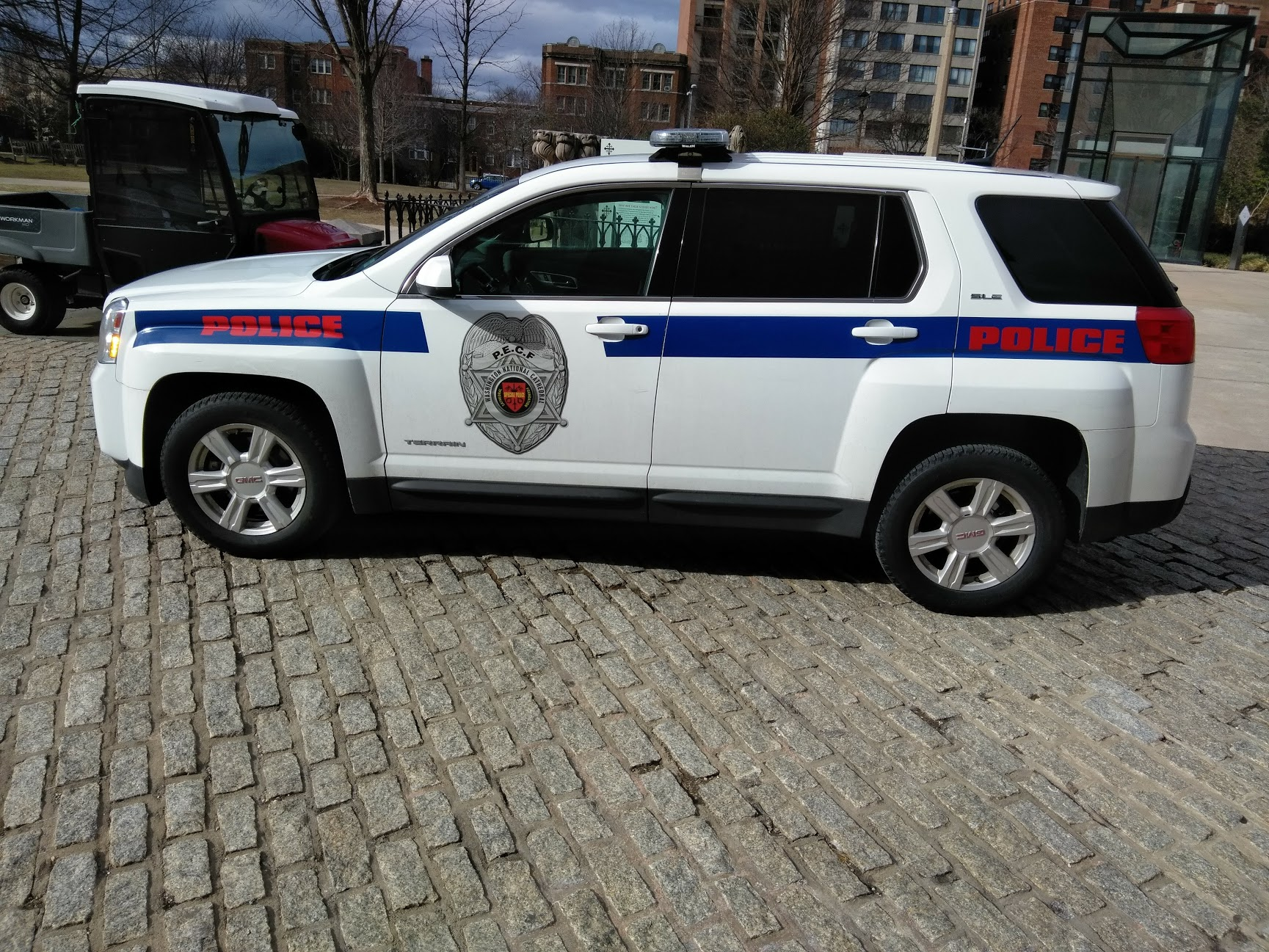
National Cathedral Police vehicle

Police officers employed by this department have full arrest authority while on duty, pursuant to the DC Code of Municipal Regulations (DCMR), Title 6a, Chapter 11, Section 1109.3 and DCMR Title 17, Chapter 21, Section 2113.4.

== Training ==
The National Cathedral Police have attended the Washington DC Campus Law Enforcement Academy (CPSI), this academy is sanctioned by DC City Council and is attended by George Washington University Police and University of the District of Columbia Police as well as several other law enforcement agencies.

== Rank structure ==
These are the ranks within the agency:

- Officer
- School Resource Officer
- Corporal

Officials:

- Sergeant
- Lieutenant
- Captain
- Chief

Civilian members:

- Emergency Management Specialist
- Human Resources
- Benefits Specialist
- Station Clerks

== See also ==
- List of law enforcement agencies in the District of Columbia
- Cathedral constable, equivalent in England
