= Chester Cathedral Constables =

Constables who maintain order in Chester Cathedral

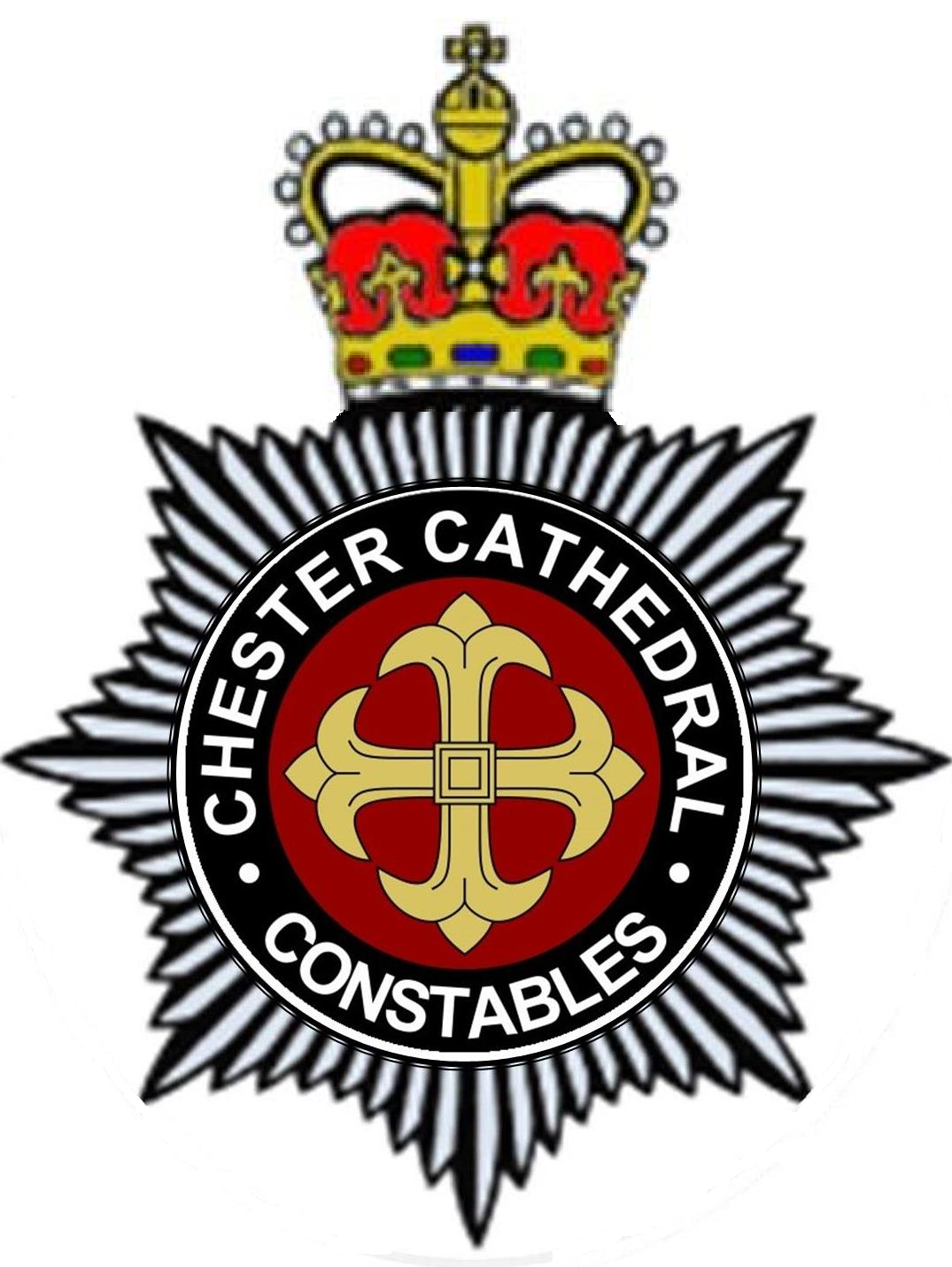
Cap badge of the Chester Cathedral Constables

Chester Cathedral Constables were a small team of cathedral constables who maintained order and security in and around the precincts of Chester Cathedral. Their duties were derived from the medieval period when common law gave custodians the powers to protect religious buildings and their communities from harm, theft, and violence. In January 2021, after more than 700 years of service, the constables were stepped down.

With the demise of the Chester Cathedral Constables, the remaining three cathedrals in the United Kingdom to retain them are Canterbury Cathedral Close Constables, York Minster Police, and Liverpool Cathedral Constables.

== Modern history ==
In December 2011, Chester Cathedral appointed a head constable to lead a new team of volunteer constables to maintain security, and to keep good order within the cathedral and its precincts.

The two longest serving were assisted with training in 2015 by the local territorial force in Cheshire. Although volunteers, they were not appointed as special constable as they worked for a private constabulary. In August and October 2017 they were joined by three former Special Constables, leaving Chester Cathedral Constabulary with five serving cathedral constables.

In June 2017 a Memorandum of Understanding (MoU) was signed by Chester Cathedral Constables (represented by Inspector Chris Jones) and Cheshire Constabulary (represented by the Chief Constable). Under the terms of the MoU the territorial police force acknowledged the right of sworn cathedral constables to carry rigid batons and handcuffs and carry out arrests. The cathedral constables agreed to deliver all arrested persons to Cheshire Constabulary for processing and custody. The MoU also acknowledged that the cathedral constables would be the initial point of contact for all policing matters on cathedral Dean & Chapter property, passing offences of a serious nature to Cheshire Police.

In common with other members of the Cathedral Constables Association (CCA), the former positions of Head Constable and Deputy Head Constable were replaced with the ranks of Inspector and Sergeant.

Chester Cathedral Constables police ranks
Ranks	Inspector; Formerly Head Constable	Sergeant; Formerly Senior Constable	Constable	Warden
Insignia				

== Abolition ==
in January 2022, Chester abolished the Chester Cathedral Constables. The remaining seven constables were transferred to the employment of the Liverpool Cathedral Constables.

== See also ==
- Cathedral constable
- Law enforcement in the United Kingdom
- List of law enforcement agencies in the United Kingdom
