= Cathedral constable =

Constable employed by a cathedral of the Church of England

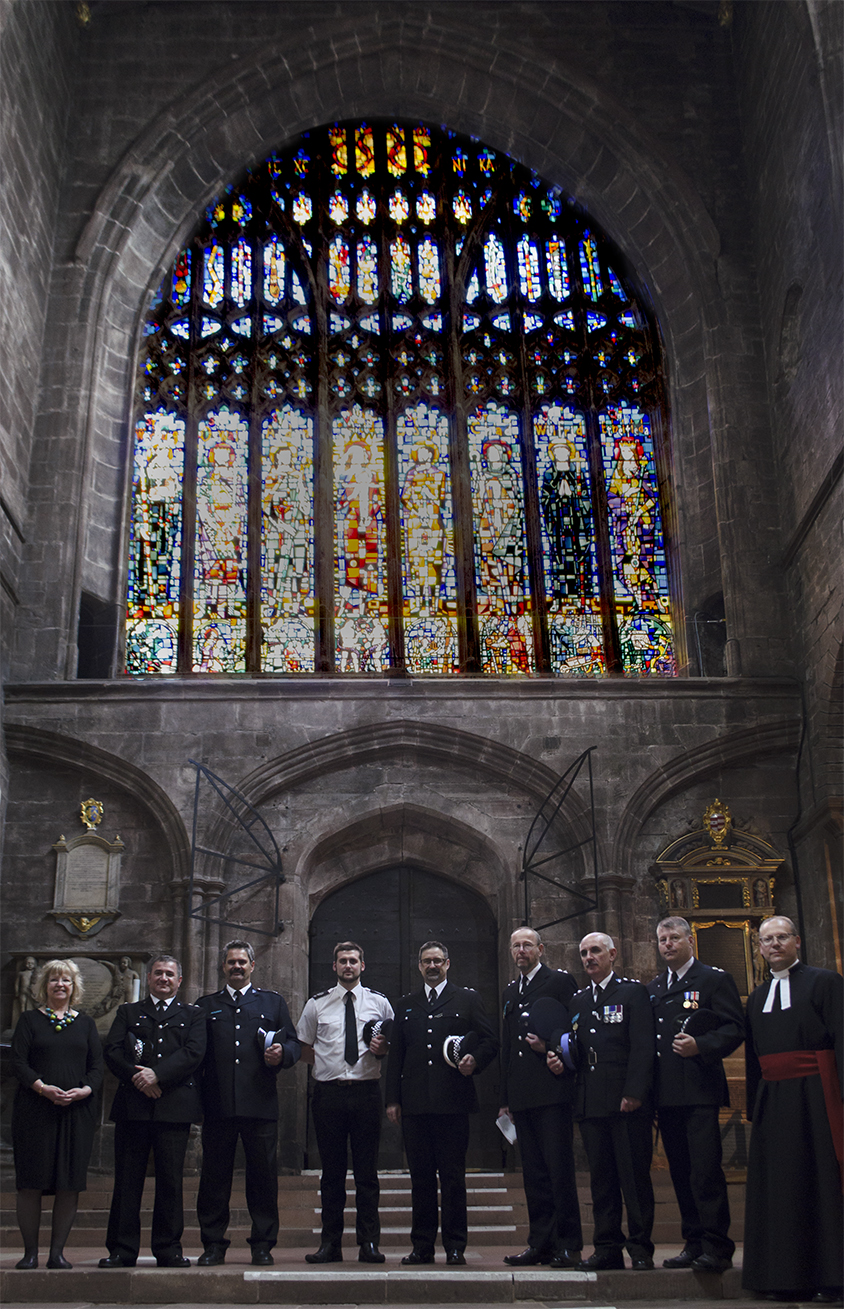
Attestation of constables at Chester Cathedral

A cathedral constable is a constable employed by a cathedral of the Church of England. They have been appointed under common law and cathedral statutes (ecclesiastical law) for nearly 800 years.

== History ==
Cathedral constables have a long history and can trace their lineage back to the 13th century.

Before the onset of professional policing something often overlooked is the close relationship which once existed between the church and the imposition of law and order. In the Middle Ages the parish was the smallest unit of local government in the country. Every parish was centred around the local church, and after the Reformation was responsible for administering civil and religious government at a local level. Many parishes developed a vestry – a small body of village officials, answerable only to the bishop and the local justices, and who were responsible for the ecclesiastical and secular well-being of the parish they served.

Parish constables, sometimes referred to as petty constables, were attested by justices of the peace but accountable to the local churchwardens. Like parish constables, church wardens were locally appointed and oversaw the administration of the parish, good order during services, and the upkeep of the church fabric and property. Similarly, many cathedrals employed constables to keep watch and maintain law and order within the cathedral and its precincts; an area often known as the Close. These officers were appointed by, and answerable to, the cathedral Dean and Chapter.

== Current operations ==
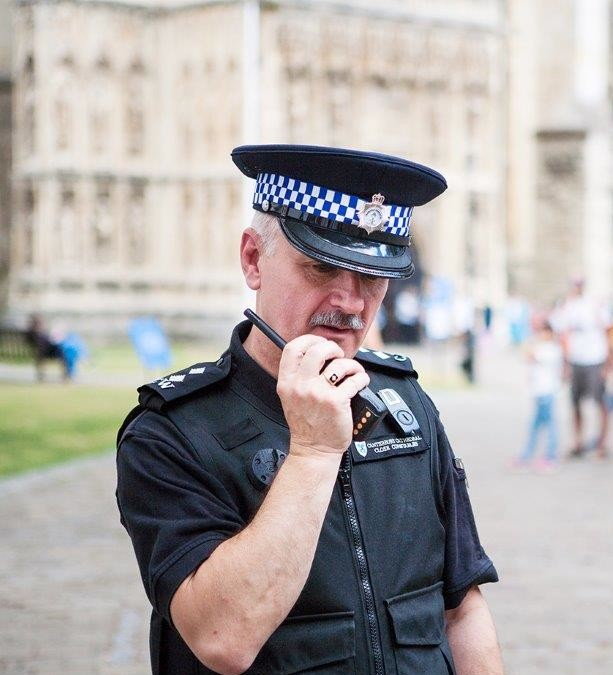
Canterbury Cathedral Constable

Constables are employed at three cathedrals:

- York Minster Police at York Minster
- Liverpool Cathedral Constables at Liverpool Cathedral
- Canterbury Cathedral Close Constables at Canterbury Cathedral

During the 21st century, constables have also operated at:

- Salisbury Cathedral Constables (abolished 2010)
- Hereford Cathedral Constables (abolished 2014)
- Chester Cathedral Constables (abolished January 2021)

== Training, equipment, and uniform ==
Cathedral constables wear a uniform very similar to British territorial police forces.

=== Attestation ===
Some officers are attested and hold the office of constable within the cathedral's curtilage, whilst others remain un-sworn. Constables who are attested wear a distinguishing royal blue and white Sillitoe tartan chequered cap band to distinguish them from their Home Office police colleagues (black and white chequered cap band) and their un-sworn colleagues (plain hat bands).

A number of officers at Canterbury, York and Liverpool are attested and hold the powers of constable in their respective cathedral and precincts. Newly appointed officers undertake pre-attestation training (provided by the CCA) together with training delivered by their own cathedral. Upon completion, officers are attested and can undertake officer safety training (OST).

=== Chief officers ===
Most of the current constabularies distinguish their chief officer with the rank markings used by a police Inspector in a territorial force. This officer generally bears the title head constable or inspector. There is a formal command structure in each constabulary of superintendent (Canterbury Cathedral only), chief inspector (Canterbury Cathedral only), inspector, sergeant, constable and unattested warden. The position of chief officer exists within the Cathedral Constables' Association (CCA).

=== Training ===
Local training is supplemented by training opportunities organised by the CCA, including the level 3 Certificate in Cathedral Constable Attestation, and individual personal safety training (PST) which is provided under contract by training officers of the Mersey Tunnels Police.

=== Ranks ===
Rank Insignia of the Cathedral Constabularies
Rank	Superintendent; Canterbury Cathedral only	Chief inspector Canterbury Cathedral only	Inspector	Sergeant	Corporal; Canterbury Cathedral only	Constable	Warden
Insignia							

== See also ==
- Corps of Gendarmerie of Vatican City
- Domfreiheit
- Law enforcement in the United Kingdom
- List of law enforcement agencies in the United Kingdom, Crown Dependencies and British Overseas Territories
- Pontifical Swiss Guard
- Washington National Cathedral Police
