= Canterbury Cathedral Close Constables =

Parks police force

Canterbury Cathedral Constables
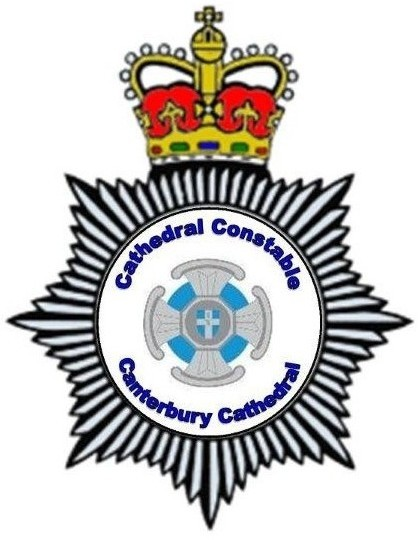
- Crest of the Canterbury Cathedral Constables

Agency overview
- Formed: 12th century, reformed in 2016

Jurisdictional structure
- Operations jurisdiction: England, UK
- General nature: Local civilian police

Operational structure
- Headquarters: Constables' Lodge and Christ Church Gate, Canterbury Cathedral, Kent
- Agency executive: Chief Inspector Fred McCormack, head constable

Facilities
- Stations: 1

The Canterbury Cathedral Close Constables are a cathedral constabulary employed by Canterbury Cathedral to maintain order and security in and around the cathedral. They have the same police powers as regular police in the United Kingdom, including the power of arrest, within the cathedral and its precincts.

The current head constable is Chief Inspector Fred McCormack.

== History ==
To professionalise security the Dean and Chapter, the body that administers Canterbury Cathedral, formed (resurrected) its own constabulary in 2016.

== Uniform and equipment ==
Everyday uniform for the Constables wear black cargo trousers, a black duty shirt/white shirt and tie displaying their Constabulary number and peaked cap with a blue and white Sillitoe tartan band.

For ceremonial duties, a formal dark tunic, dark trousers and white shirt and tie are worn, along with the peaked cap. State medals (if issued) are worn on the left breast and Cathedral Constable Association (CCA) medals are worn on the right.

Since 2016 the close constables have been permitted to use personal protection equipment, including a protective vest, handcuffs and a PR-24 tactical baton.

=== Rank Structure ===
The close constables are led by a Superintendent/head constable, who is supported by an operational Inspector and four Sergeants, each of whom leads a shift supported by four Corporals.

Canterbury Cathedral Close Constables
| Rank | Chief inspector Formerly head constable | Inspector; Formerly deputy head constable | Sergeant; Formerly senior constable | Corporal | Close constable | Warden |
| Insignia | | | | | | |

== See also ==
- York Minster Police
- Liverpool Cathedral Constables
- Chester Cathedral Constables
- Cathedral constable
- Law enforcement in the United Kingdom
- List of law enforcement agencies in the United Kingdom
