= Liverpool Cathedral Constables =

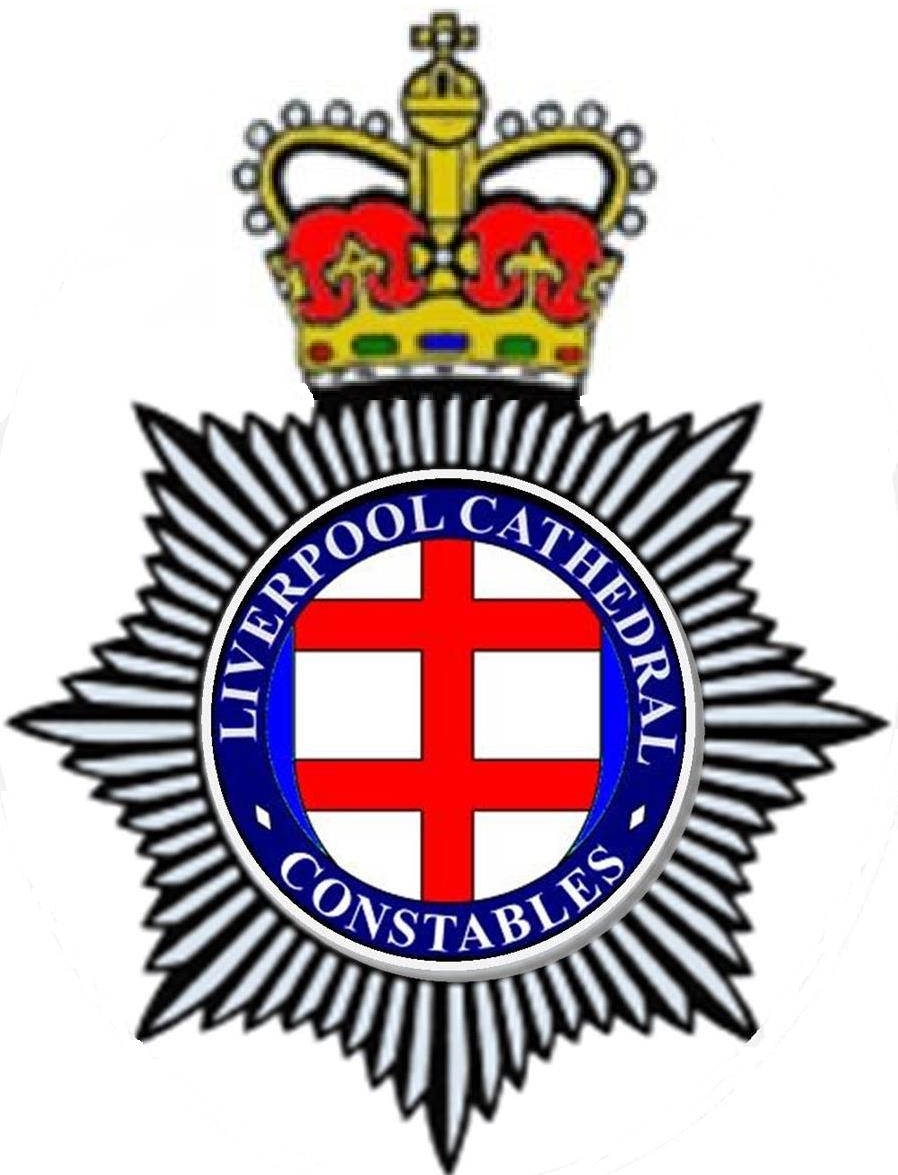
- Liverpool Cathedral Constables' Crest

Jurisdictional structure
- Operations jurisdiction: England, UK
- Legal jurisdiction: Liverpool Cathedral
- Governing body: Liverpool Cathedral
- General nature: Civilian police

Facilities
- Stations: 1

Website
- Official Page on Cathedral Website

Liverpool Cathedral Constables are a cathedral constabulary responsible for providing security for Liverpool Cathedral, in the city of Liverpool, England, in the north-west of the United Kingdom of Great Britain and Ireland.

== History ==
Its officers follow a long-held tradition of cathedral constables dating back to the thirteenth century. At one time many Anglican cathedrals appointed ecclesiastical constables to uphold law and order in and around their precincts.

Today Liverpool Cathedral is one of only three cathedrals nationally still to employ constables, along with York Minster (York Minster Police) and Canterbury Cathedral (Canterbury Cathedral Close Constables). Cathedral constables were employed at Salisbury Cathedral until 2010, when they were replaced with security guards and traffic managers, at Hereford Cathedral until 2014, and Chester Cathedral until 2021 when they were transferred to Liverpool Cathedral.

The constables endeavour to maintain the history and tradition of ecclesiastical constables through the Cathedral Constables' Association. The constables, through the Cathedral Constables' Association, have published a short book entitled, Cathedral Bobbies. The book is a series of reflections related to individual constable's experiences.

== Operations ==
Today, Liverpool Cathedral and its precinct are protected by a team of 10 constables managed by a Head Constable who in turn reports to the Cathedral Inspector. Working in teams of two, they provide 24-hour cover, 365 days a year. The security of the cathedral is not their only responsibility; constables also patrol the adjacent residential college campus, providing security to the young people who live there.

=== Constables' Lodge ===
Constables work out of the Constables’ Lodge, a single storey building at the entrance to the cathedral's precinct, and from where they watch all comings and goings with the aid of an extensive range of CCTV cameras and monitors. In January 2011, the cathedral appointed its first female constable.

== Equipment and uniform ==
The cathedral's constables wear uniforms similar to typical British police officers.

They wear a white shirt with epaulettes, black tie, black combat style trousers, and a high visibility jacket with the words "Cathedral Constable" on the back.

Not all officers are attested, but attested officers are distinguishable by their wearing of a cap with a Sillitoe tartan (black and white chequered) band, the addition of ‘Police’ below Cathedral Constable on their uniform and the carrying of personal safety equipment. All constables are trained to deal with difficult and occasionally dangerous situations whilst ensuring minimal disruption to the spiritual tranquility of the cathedral.

=== Rank Structure ===
The rank structure of the Liverpool Cathedral Constables is smaller than most police forces, due to its size, but the ranks themselves are similar. The senior officer is an Inspector.

Liverpool Cathedral police ranks
| Rank | Inspector; Formerly head constable | Sergeant; Formerly senior constable | Constable | Warden |
| Insignia | | | | |

== Territorial policing ==
More serious crimes and policing incidents on the cathedral precincts are handled by the local territorial police force, Merseyside Police.

== See also ==
- York Minster Police
- Canterbury Cathedral Close Constables
- Cathedral constable
- List of UK & BOT law enforcement agencies
