= Hammersmith and Fulham Parks Constabulary =

Parks police force

Agency overview
- Formed: 2019 (re-formed)
- Preceding agency: Parks Police Service (2013-2019)
- Dissolved: 2021
- Superseding agency: Hammersmith and Fulham Neighbourhood Enforcement Team

Jurisdictional structure
- Operations jurisdiction: England, UK
- Legal jurisdiction: parks within Hammersmith and Fulham
- Governing body: London Borough of Hammersmith and Fulham
- Constituting instrument: Section 18, Ministry of Housing and Local Government Provisional Order Confirmation (Greater London Parks and Open Spaces) Act 1967
- General nature: Local civilian police

Operational structure
- Constables: 14

Website
- Former Official Website

The Hammersmith and Fulham Parks Constabulary was a small constabulary responsible for policing the parks and open spaces of the London Borough of Hammersmith and Fulham. In 2013, it merged with the Royal Borough of Kensington and Chelsea Parks Police to form the Parks Police Service.

In July 2019 the former Parks Police Service (formed in 2013 by the merger of Royal Borough of Kensington and Chelsea Parks Police and Hammersmith and Fulham Parks Constabulary) was dissolved when once again Kensington & Chelsea and Hammersmith & Fulham each took responsibility for their own police service. In 2021, the Hammersmith and Fulham Parks Constabulary was disbanded and replaced with a Neighbourhood Enforcement Team to patrol the whole borough. The new force will have no constabulary powers.

== Powers ==
Members of the constabulary were sworn as constables under section 18, Ministry of Housing and Local Government Provision Order Confirmation (Greater London Parks and Open Spaces) Act 1967. As such, they were warranted constables and had powers of arrest, detention and search, as well as the authority to carry weapons (such as batons), as well as the power to enforce the parks byelaws and regulations.

== Organisation and duties ==
The constabulary consisted of 2 sergeants and 12 constables. They patrolled the borough's 54 parks, open spaces and cemeteries, 365 days a year, with operating hours from 10am to 9pm (October to March) and from midday to 10pm (April to September).

The duties included:

- high visibility uniform patrolling on foot, bicycle and vehicle
- enforcing bye-laws and public space protection orders (PSPOs)
- the prevention and detection of crime
- dealing with anti-social behaviour (ASB)
- working with residents and stakeholders to problem-solve local issues quickly and effectively
- security at events such as the Boat Race, council firework displays and Remembrance Day ceremonies
- lost property in parks
- locking major parks in the evening.

The constabulary also had a key role in supporting the response to any major incidents in the borough. The constabulary were able to monitor CCTV systems covering a number of parks. The constabulary provided a service 365 days a year during daylight hours, and until 11pm during the summer. Some later patrols were also organised to tackle specific problems and respond to residents' concerns.

== Uniform and equipment ==
The Constables wore a typical British police uniform, which included:

- white shirt
- black tie (male) or black and white cravat (female)
- dark blue or black trousers
- black peaked cap with black and white chequered capband with Parks Police capbadge (male)
- black bowler cap with black and white chequered capband with Parks Police capbadge (female)
- black or dark blue trousers
- black stab vest with
- high-visibility jackets

Park Police constables were warranted constables and therefore carry batons, as well as handcuffs, radios and other police equipment. They also wore body cameras and have a GPS tracked digital radio system which allows controllers to track the location of constables in real time.

Parks Police used vehicles to patrol, as well as carrying out usual foot patrols.

== See also ==
- Law enforcement in the United Kingdom
- Royal Borough of Kensington and Chelsea Parks Police
- Parks Police Service (defunct)
- List of law enforcement agencies in the United Kingdom, Crown Dependencies and British Overseas Territories
