= Hampstead Heath Constabulary =

Police in Hampstead Heath, London

- Abbreviation: HHC

Agency overview
- Formed: 1992
- Preceding agencies: London County Council Parks Constabulary; Greater London Council's Warranted Enforcement Team; Hampstead Heath Dog Section (under the control of the London Residuary Body)

Jurisdictional structure
- Operations jurisdiction: UK
- Governing body: City of London Corporation
- Constituting instruments: Section 18, Ministry of Housing and Local Government Provisional Order Confirmation (Greater London Parks and Open Spaces) Act 1967; City of London Open Spaces Department under section 16 of the Corporation of London Open Spaces Act 1878
- General nature: Local civilian police

Facilities
- Stations: 1

The Hampstead Heath Constabulary (HHC) is the organisation that patrols Hampstead Heath, London, which is administered by the City of London Corporation.

== Duties ==
The Hampstead Heath Constabulary consists of 12 constables and acts as the parks police for the Heath. The HHC is:

called upon to enforce Byelaws, Common Law and Criminal Law, protect City of London property and provide a response to any incident that may disrupt the enjoyment of users of these sites.

From their inauguration until 24 May 2018 some constables worked with general purpose police dogs, all licensed to National Police Chiefs' Council (NPCC)/Home Office standards. They have been responsible for patrolling the Heath since 1992.

== Powers ==
Members of the constabulary are attested as constables under Article 18 of the Ministry of Housing and Local Government Provisional Order Confirmation (Greater London Parks and Open Spaces) Act 1967 before a City of London magistrate.

The City of London Corporation is not a relevant local authority for the purposes of the 1967 Act. However, the power to attest officers is enabled by article 5(1) of the London Government Reorganisation (Hampstead Heath) Order 1989, which allows the City of London Corporation to exercise the same functions that the former Greater London Council had in relation to Hampstead Heath. This creates a legal anomaly in that the constabulary powers afforded by their attestation only relate to Hampstead Heath and cannot be exercised in any other park or open space under the control of the City of London.

The officers are appointed under Section 16 of the Corporation of London Open Spaces Act 1878, which gives them the powers "within any open space under the control of the City of London Corporation; other than Epping Forest", which is specifically excluded from the legislation. This additional power differentiates them from other parks constabularies, as it gives Heath officers full police powers, within their jurisdiction.

Thus, they enjoy full powers of a constable in relation to the bylaws and regulations, general law and specific legislation for open spaces. They work in close partnership with the Metropolitan Police, the territorial police force for Greater London, to which all serious criminal offences are passed for further investigation. They also maintain a close relationship with the City of London Police, who supply equipment and training to the service, and further training is also supplied by Surrey Police.

== Uniform and equipment ==
As administered as part of the City of London, the constabulary share a similar uniform with the City of London Police and have red and white chequered sleeve and cap bands (red and white being the colours of the City of London) on their caps, which in most other British police forces are black and white. The operational uniform consists of:

- White shirt & tie/black wicking shirt
- Black trousers
- Boots
- Custodian helmet or peaked cap (male) and bowler cap (female)
- Black fleece
- Black stab vest
- Yellow high-visibility jackets.

As constables they are authorised to carry and use batons, in addition to handcuffs, torches, radios and other typical police equipment. Rank is worn on epaulettes in operational uniform and for Sergeants on the sleeves of tunics. Typical of British police agencies, constables and sergeants wear a collar number to identify themselves.

The HHC patrol the heath on foot, mountain bike and in marked vehicles.

== Ranks ==
Manager	Non-uniformed role
Sergeant	Uk-police-02
Constable/Constable Dog Handler	Uk-police-01

== Identity ==
The Heath Constabulary continue to use the term "Constabulary" rather than "Parks Police" to portray a more local and traditional aim of policing, but for those who are confused by the term the words "Policing Hampstead Heath" have been added to their vehicles to clarify their aim.

The constables are paid for out of charitable and private funds held by the City of London Corporation, and as such, their activity is not subject to the Freedom of Information Act. This contrasts with the status of most other constables appointed within non-territorial police forces, such as port police.

== See also ==
- List of law enforcement agencies in the United Kingdom, Crown Dependencies and British Overseas Territories
