= Parks Police Service =

Defunct Londinian police force

Agency overview
- Formed: 2013
- Preceding agencies: Royal Borough of Kensington and Chelsea Parks Police; Hammersmith and Fulham Parks Constabulary
- Dissolved: 2019
- Superseding agency: Hammersmith and Fulham Parks Constabulary, Royal Borough of Kensington and Chelsea Parks Police

Jurisdictional structure
- Operations jurisdiction: England, UK
- Constituting instrument: Section 18, Ministry of Housing and Local Government Provisional Order Confirmation (Greater London Parks and Open Spaces) Act 1967
- General nature: Local civilian police

Notables
- Award: Queen Elizabeth II Golden Jubilee Medal

The Parks Police Service was a small constabulary responsible for policing 87 parks and open spaces in the boroughs of Kensington and Chelsea and Hammersmith and Fulham. The police force was created through the merger of Hammersmith and Fulham Parks Constabulary and Royal Borough of Kensington and Chelsea Parks Police in 2013. In 2019, the respective councils of Hammersmith & Fulham and Kengsinton & Chelsea disaggregated some of their shared services, including the Parks Police. As such, the Parks Police Service ceased to exist and the Royal Borough of Kensington and Chelsea Parks Police and the Hammersmith and Fulham Parks Constabulary came back into existence.

== Powers ==
Members of the constabulary were sworn as constables under section 18, Ministry of Housing and Local Government Provision Order Confirmation (Greater London Parks and Open Spaces) Act 1967. Such constables have the powers of a constable to deal with by-laws relating to parks and open spaces under their control.

== Staffing ==
The Parks Police Service was staffed by one police inspector, five police sergeants and thirty constables.

The Metropolitan Police Service worked alongside the Parks Police Service, especially assisting with serious crimes.

== Cessation ==
In July 2019, the Royal Borough of Kensington and Chelsea Parks Police service were separated into the Royal Borough of Kensington and Chelsea Parks Police and the Hammersmith and Fulham Parks Constabulary.

== See also ==
- Law enforcement in the United Kingdom
- Hammersmith and Fulham Parks Constabulary
- Royal Borough of Kensington and Chelsea Parks Police
- List of law enforcement agencies in the United Kingdom, Crown Dependencies and British Overseas Territories
