= Sillitoe tartan =

Black (or other) and white chequered pattern, associated with policing

Black-and-white Sillitoe tartan, commonly used by police in the United Kingdom (other than the City of London Police, who use red and white).

Blue and white Sillitoe pattern, commonly used for police in Australia and New Zealand, as well as in Norway and for cathedral constables in England.

Sillitoe tartan is a distinctive chequered pattern, usually black-and-white or blue-and-white, which was originally associated with the police in Scotland. (Note: Tartan is a misnomer, as the pattern is a form of chequer, also known as dicing, not of tartan.) It later gained widespread use in the rest of the United Kingdom and overseas, notably in Australia, as well as Chicago and Pittsburgh in the United States. It is used occasionally elsewhere, including by some Spanish municipal police, in limited use by the New Zealand Police and in parts of Canada, where it is limited to auxiliary police services.

The Sillitoe pattern may be composed of several different colours and numbers of rows depending on local customs, but when incorporated into uniforms or vehicle livery, it serves to uniquely identify emergency services personnel to the public.

== History ==
The pattern was originally used as a symbol of Scottish heraldry, appearing in the coats of arms of various families. It is claimed that the pattern originated from highland soldiers weaving white ribbons into their black helmets. Later, the pattern was also used by some Scottish volunteer regiments of the 1860s and the Lovat Scouts during the early 1900s.

The pattern was first adopted for police use in 1932 by Sir Percy Sillitoe, Chief Constable of the City of Glasgow Police, who required them to be used on cap bands. This was in order to distinguish police from other public servants who wore similar hats. Originally white bands were used, with the black added as the bands otherwise quickly became dirty.

The use of the pattern remained solely Scottish until 1961, where it was adopted by the South Australian Police. It spread to the other Australian states and territories and the wider UK in the 1970s.

== Usage by country ==
=== Australia ===
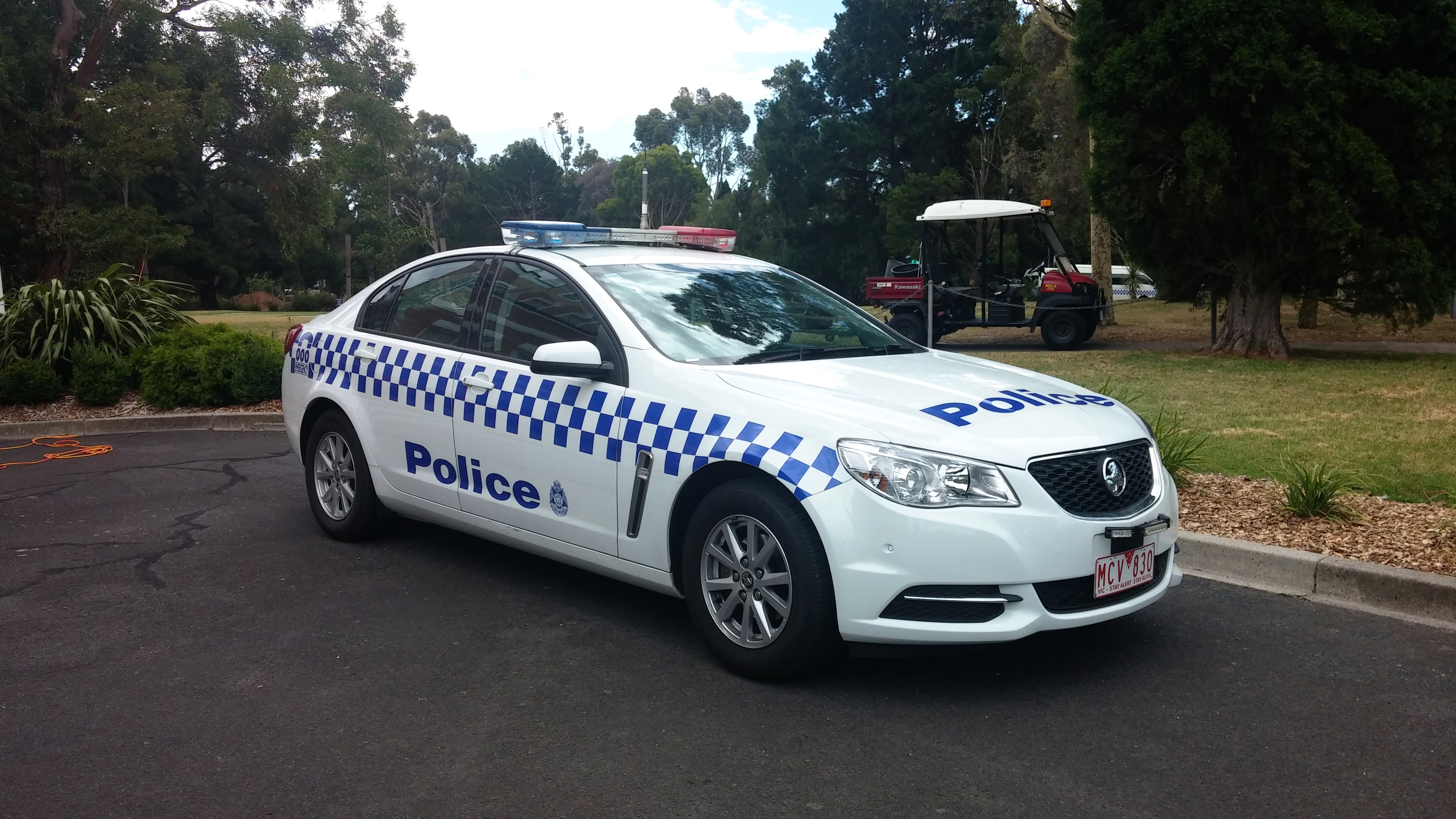
A Victoria Police Holden Commodore VF, Australia

Blue and white chequers have become the ubiquitous symbol of policing in Australia. The pattern was introduced into Australia by the Commissioner of the South Australia Police in 1961, following a fact-finding tour of Glasgow in 1960. Committee member Sgt. W Rodgers suggested the inclusion during his time in SA Police, as he had observed during his earlier years in England. The police forces of the remaining states and territories progressively adopted the pattern during the 1970s until it was displayed on all Australian police uniforms except that of the Australian Federal Police, who use a black and white Sillitoe tartan on their cap bands.

The Australasian Centre for Policing Research (ACPR) approved a national specification for police vehicle markings in 1995 which saw all vehicles marked with a chequer band stripe running the full length of the vehicle. This was adopted by all states with the exception of New South Wales which eventually adopted the national standard in 2002.

Other coloured chequered patterns may be used to denote other emergency services and particular usage varies from state to state. For example, in New South Wales the Ambulance Service uses red and white chequers on ambulances and paramedic's uniforms, while the State Emergency Service uses orange and white Sillitoe tartan. St John Ambulance uses a white and green pattern on their vehicles and operational uniforms in both South Australia and Victoria. In New South Wales the Roads & Maritime Services Traffic Emergency Patrol have adopted a yellow and purple Sillitoe tartan whereas the Victorian counterpart, VicRoads have adopted a green and white variant.

Patterns		Example
State/Territory/Federal/Military: Police	Blue and white	
NSW: Ambulance Service; Northern Territory: Fire and Rescue Service; Victoria: Country Fire Authority	Red and white	
NSW: Fire & Rescue New South Wales, and Surf Life Saving Australia South Australia: Country Fire Service Victoria: Country Fire Authority	Yellow and red	
State Emergency Service	Orange and white	
National: St Andrew's First Aid Australia NSW: Patient Transport Service, Volunteer Rescue Association; South Australia and Victoria: St. John Ambulance, Victoria: VicRoads Transport Safety Services	Green and white	
Western Australia: St John Ambulance Western Australia	Yellow and green	
National: RAAF - Security Forces, NSW: Corrective Services, Marine Rescue NSW; South Australia: Police - Protective Security Services, Victoria: Police - Protective Services Officers	Yellow and blue	
NSW: Transport for NSW Traffic Emergency Patrol Northern Territory: Transit Safety Services	Yellow and purple	
NSW: Transport for NSW Traffic Signals and Repairs crews	Grey, blue and green	
NSW: Transport for NSW Maritime NSW	Blue and orange	
NSW: Sydney Light Rail Response vehicle	Grey, blue and red	

=== New Zealand ===
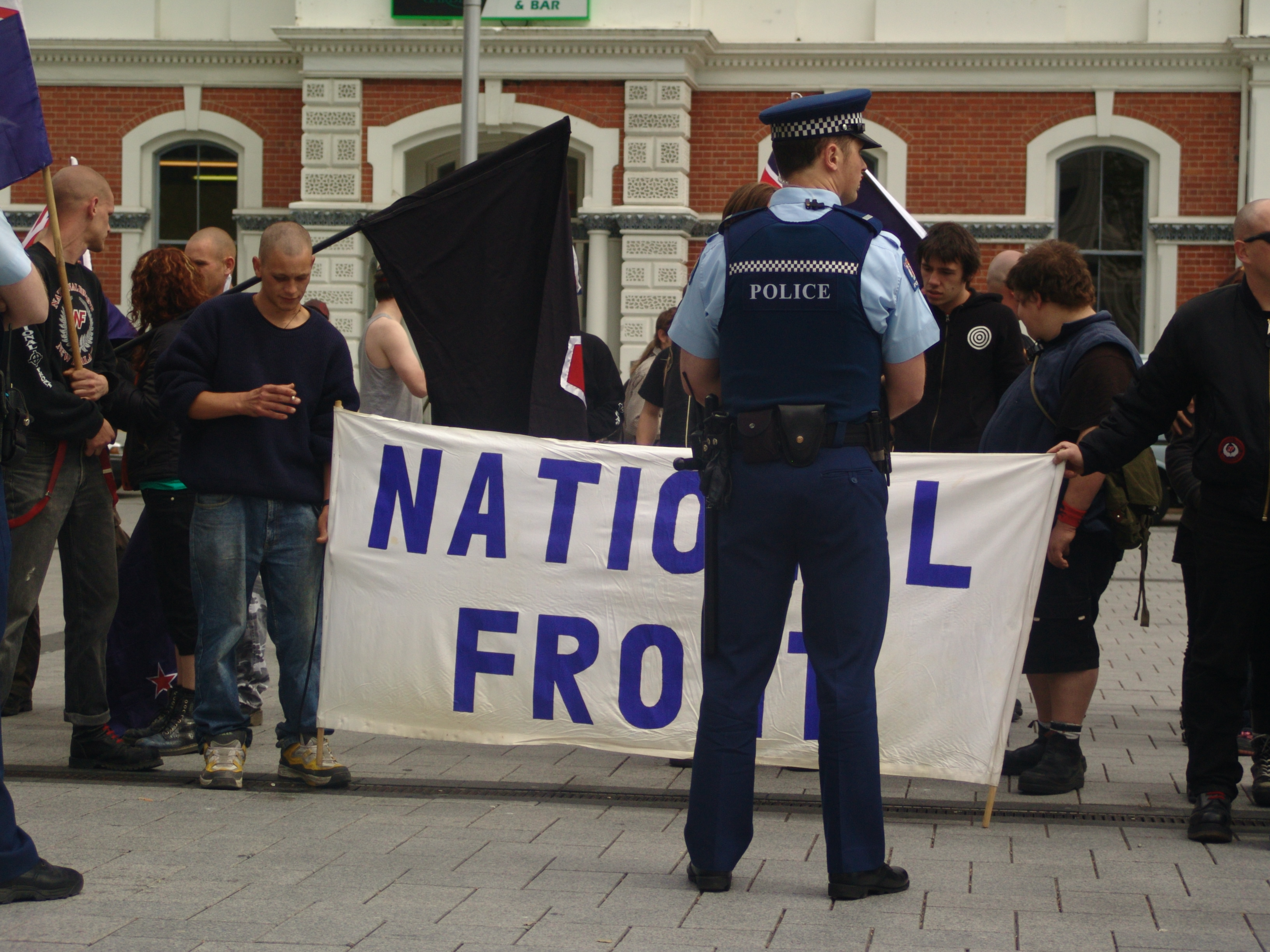
Police officer in New Zealand with chequered band on hat and stab vest

General law enforcement in New Zealand is handled by the New Zealand Police the country's national police service. The New Zealand Police wear a blue uniform, similar in colour to those found in Australia. For the majority of police branding the New Zealand Police use their own branding instead of the Sillitoe tartan marking such as the Police Koru, Tide Koru, Koru line, tukutuku chevron, Police tohu, Police crest, Police logo and coat of arms. The New Zealand Police very rarely uses Sillitoe tartan markings on vehicles, the only instances are on the now retired Armed Response Team (ART) vehicles, a singular Mobile Police Base and the Police Eagle helicopters. The vast majority of police vehicles instead use specially designed reflective Battenberg markings. The only other use of Sillitoe tartan markings is on the unform to ensure police can be easily identifiable even for international visitors.

=== United Kingdom ===
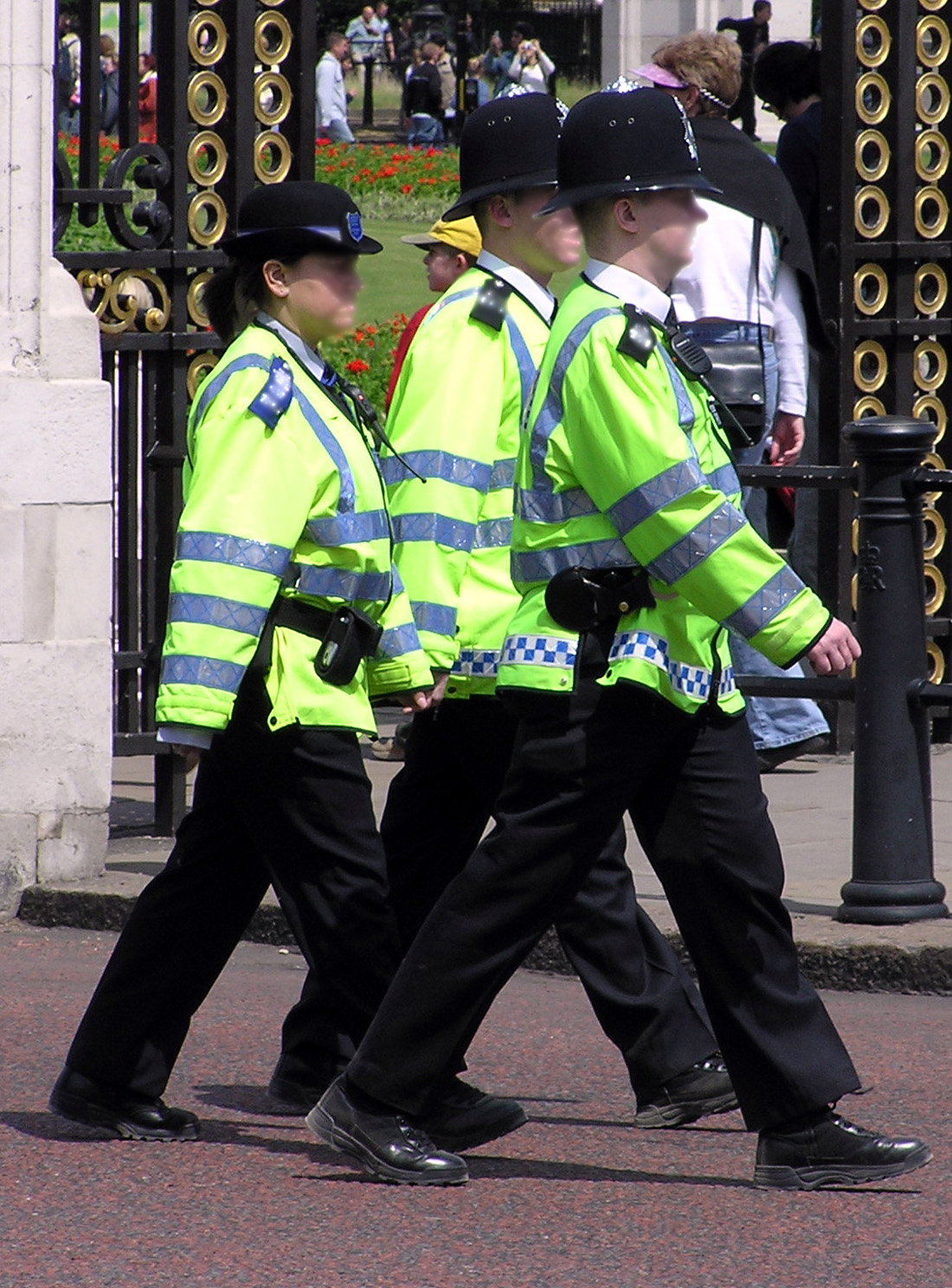
Metropolitan Police officers and a PCSO with blue-and-white Sillitoe tartan on the bottoms of their jackets

Introduced by chief constable of Glasgow Sir Percy Sillitoe in 1932, the Sillitoe tartan was an exclusively Scottish phenomenon until introduced in South Australia in 1961. From 1972, within the United Kingdom, the original black and white Scottish version began to rapidly spread throughout England and Wales and it is now used by all police forces in Great Britain. It is worn on peaked caps, baseball caps and equestrian helmets, as well as the bowler hats and cravats of female officers.

Most forces use black and white chequered bands; the City of London Police uses distinctive red and white chequers. The City of London Corporation also run the Hampstead Heath Constabulary and the Billingsgate Market Constabulary (who are no longer attested as constables but retain the historic title), which also use red and white chequers. The Hammersmith and Fulham Parks Constabulary, who are run by the local authority, also originally used red and white chequers in line with the corporate colours of the council but they reverted to the standard type.

Attested cathedral constables, employed at a number of Anglican cathedrals, have adopted a royal blue and white chequered cap band in order to distinguish them from their Home Office police colleagues.

The now defunct Royal Parks Constabulary originally wore green and white chequers, but later changed to the standard police blue and white chequers. The Royal Parks Constabulary Scotland were a separate force to their aforementioned English counterparts and they also used green and white chequers.

While the Sillitoe tartan is not used in the dress uniform of the Police Service of Northern Ireland, it does appear on the force's baseball caps, motorcycle helmets and high-visibility jackets.

Blue and white chequers are also associated with the police, and may be used on vehicles and signage. Subsequent to the launching of Battenburg markings on police vehicles in the 1990s, the police introduced retro-reflective versions of the Sillitoe tartan markings to their uniforms, usually in blue and white, rather than the blue and yellow used on vehicles.

Many police forces have a sky blue and white Sillitoe tartan hatband as part of their PCSOs uniform. This is as a result of moves by the trade union Unison to develop a national law enforcement uniform within the UK.

As a result of this the blue and white Sillitoe tartan has been taken up by a number of municipal organisations, including the London Borough of Newham Law Enforcement and Nottingham City Council Community Protection, who are accredited under the Community Safety Accreditation Scheme.

It is also being taken on by a number of private security organisations (most notably Canary Wharf Security) to project the attributes of public law enforcement.

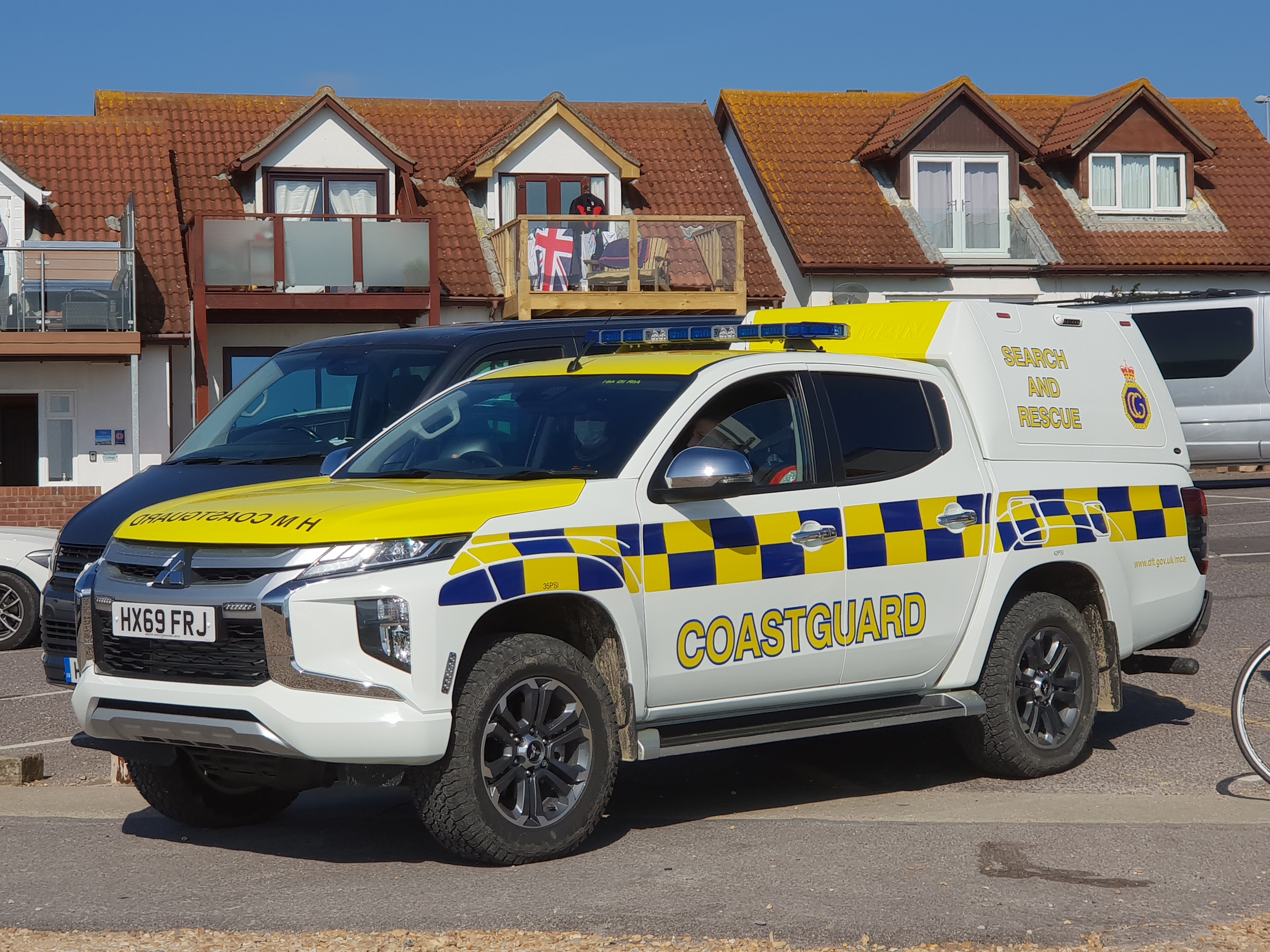
HM coastguard car with Dark blue and yellow Sillitoe tartan

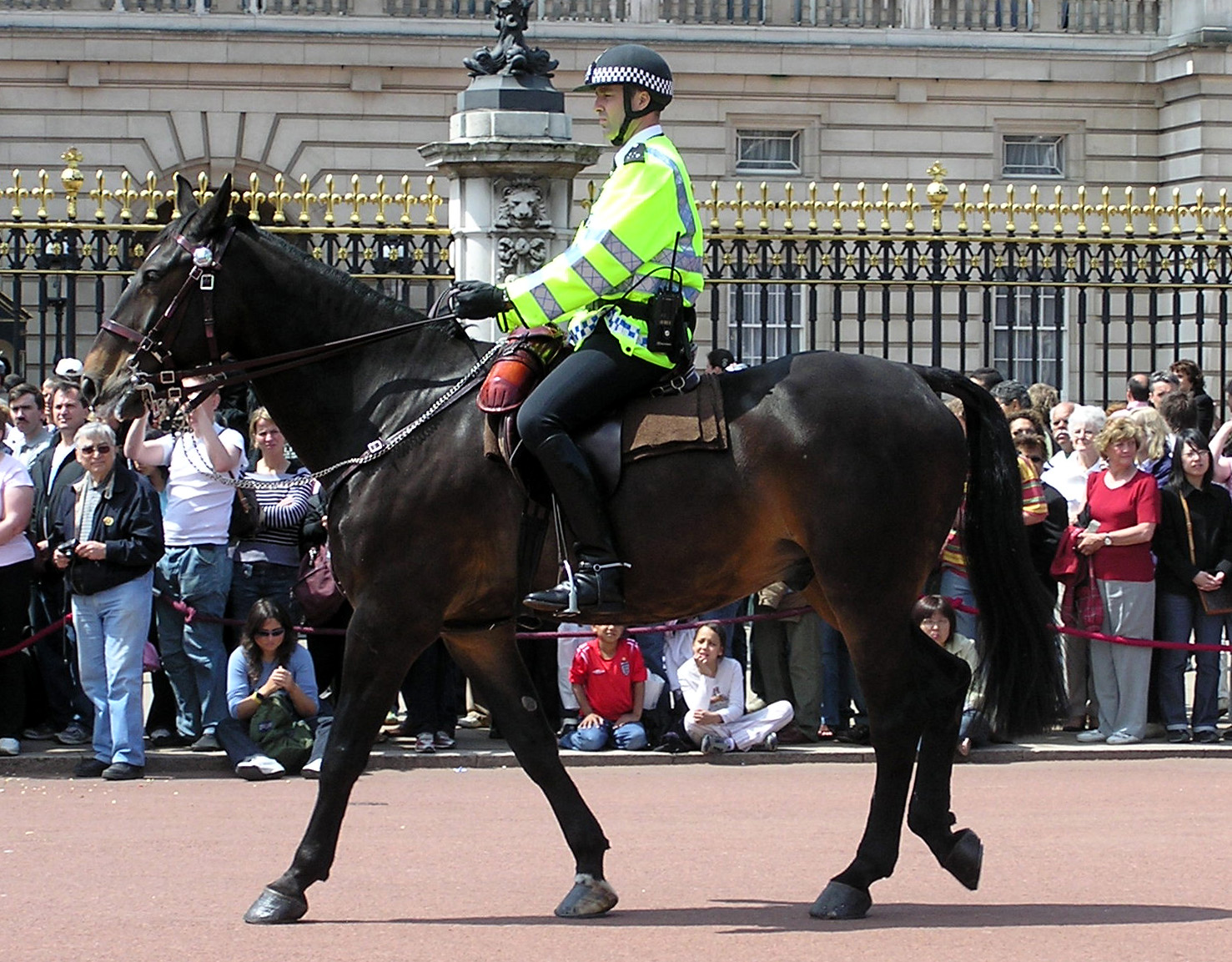
Mounted officer of the Metropolitan Police at Buckingham Palace with the Sillitoe tartan rimming the helmet, London

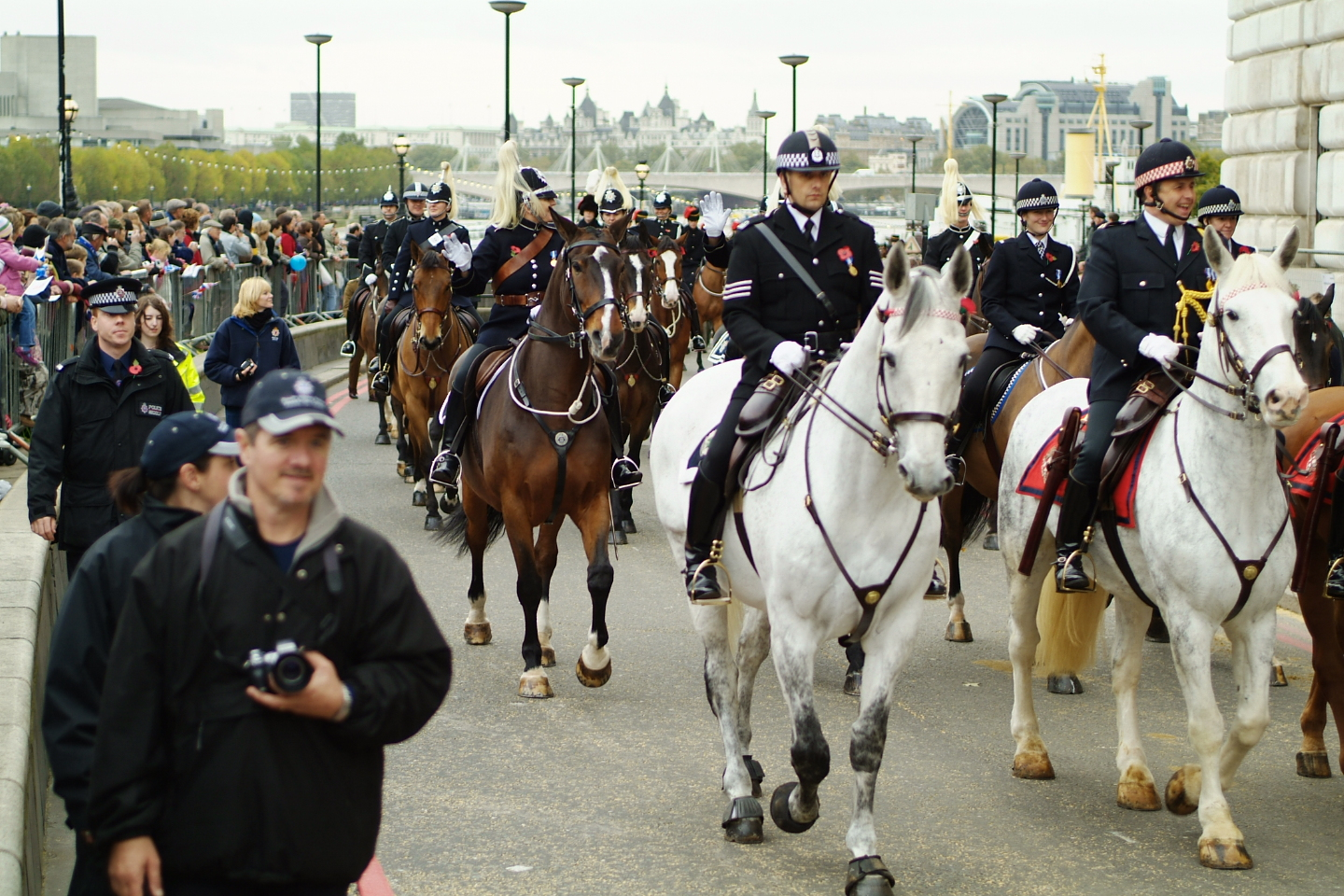
Mounted officers of the Metropolitan Police and the City of London Police with examples of black and white as well as red and white chequers on equestrian helmets

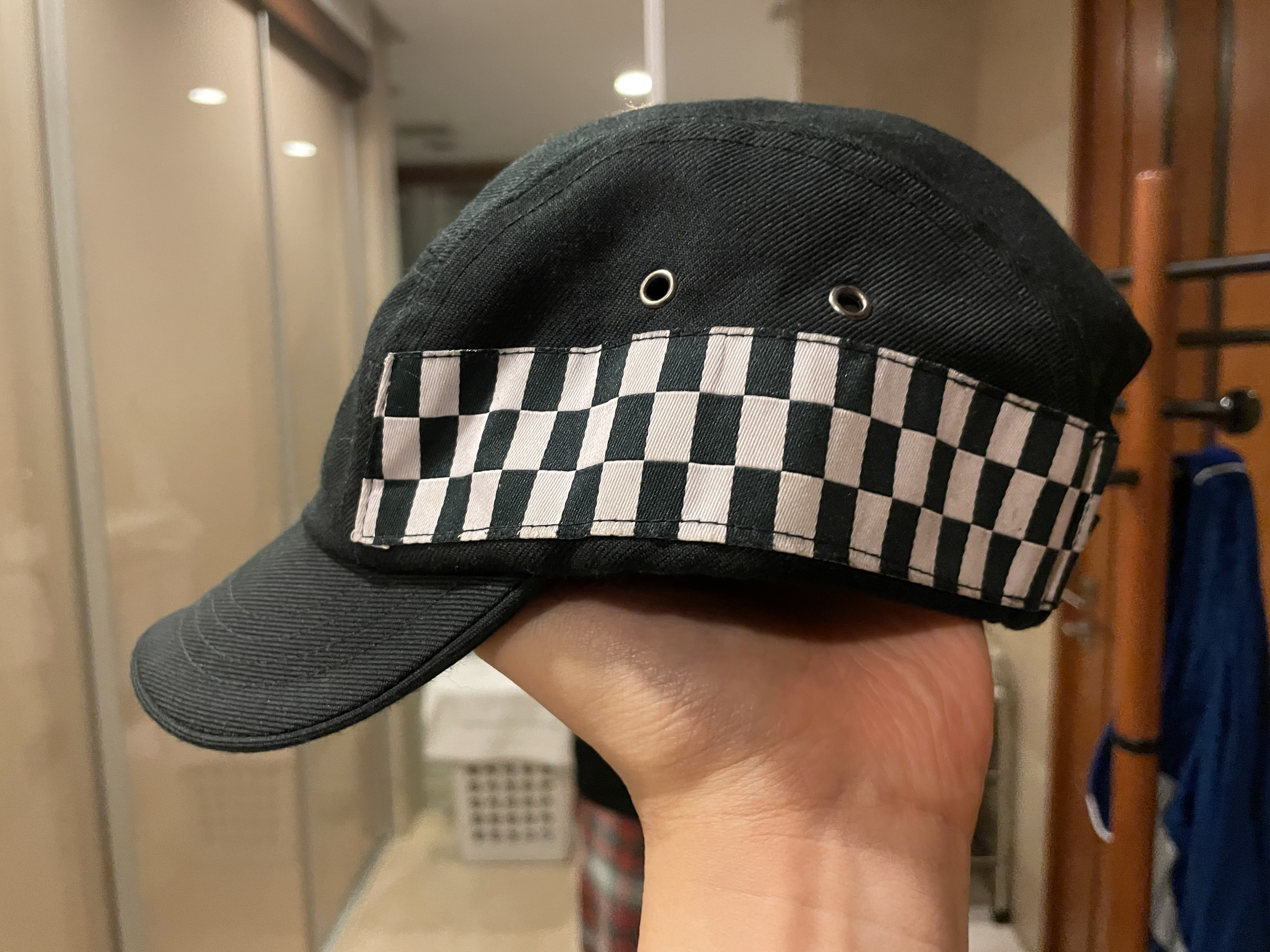
Sillitoe tartan on a baseball cap of the Police Service of Northern Ireland

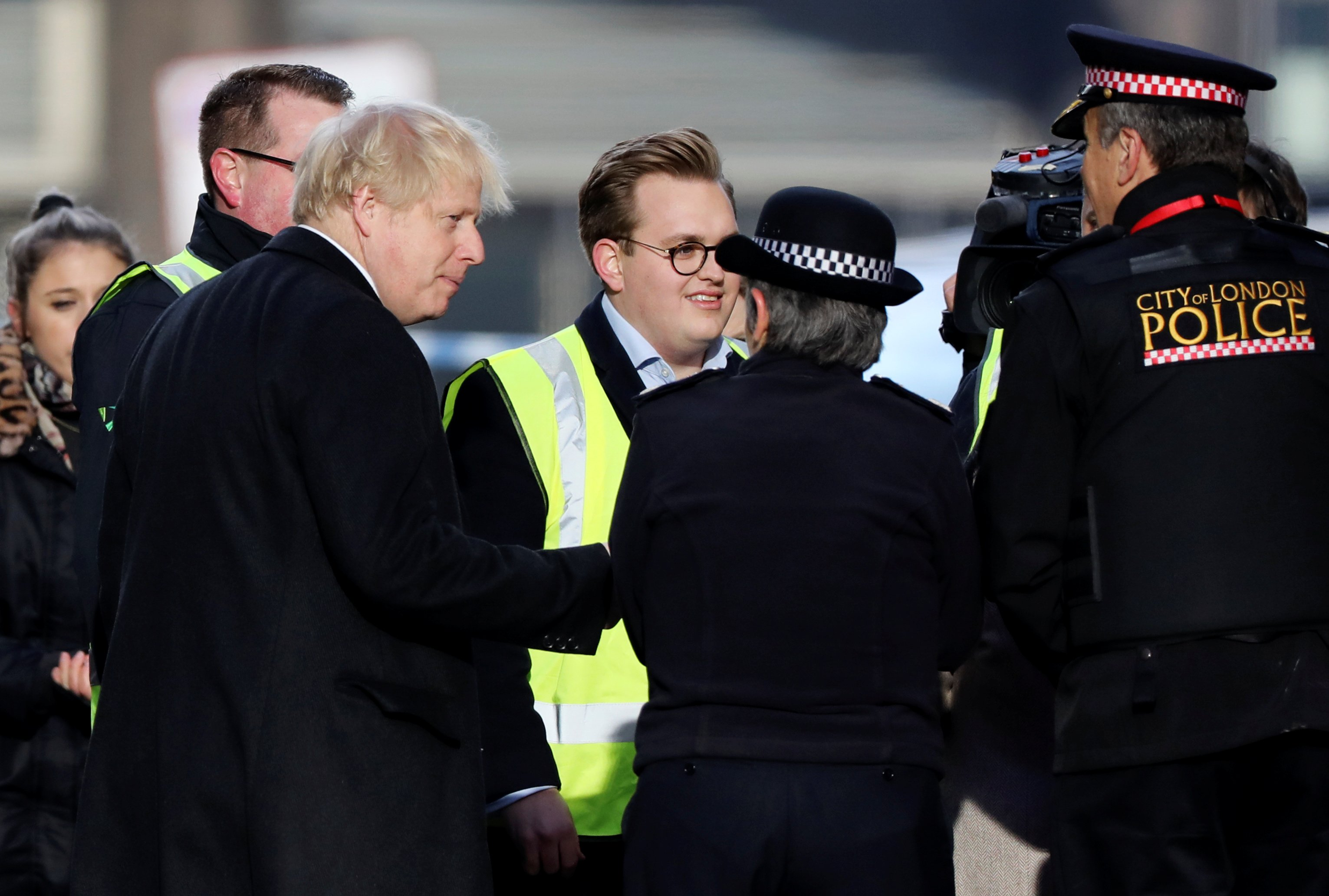
Examples of black and white as well as red and white chequers on the hats of police officers in London

=== United States ===
Only a few police forces in the US have adopted the chequered pattern: the Chicago Police Department, Cook County Sheriff's Police and Brookfield Police in Illinois, Forest Park Police and Evergreen Park Police in Illinois, Hillside Police in Illinois, the Washington, D.C. police, and the Pittsburgh Police. U.S. police departments prefer to use a two-row pattern, instead of the three-row pattern common in Europe and Australasia. Many other departments in the United States and Canada, while lacking the tartan on their cap bands, have begun using two-row reflective versions as part of the design on high-visibility outer garments and vests.

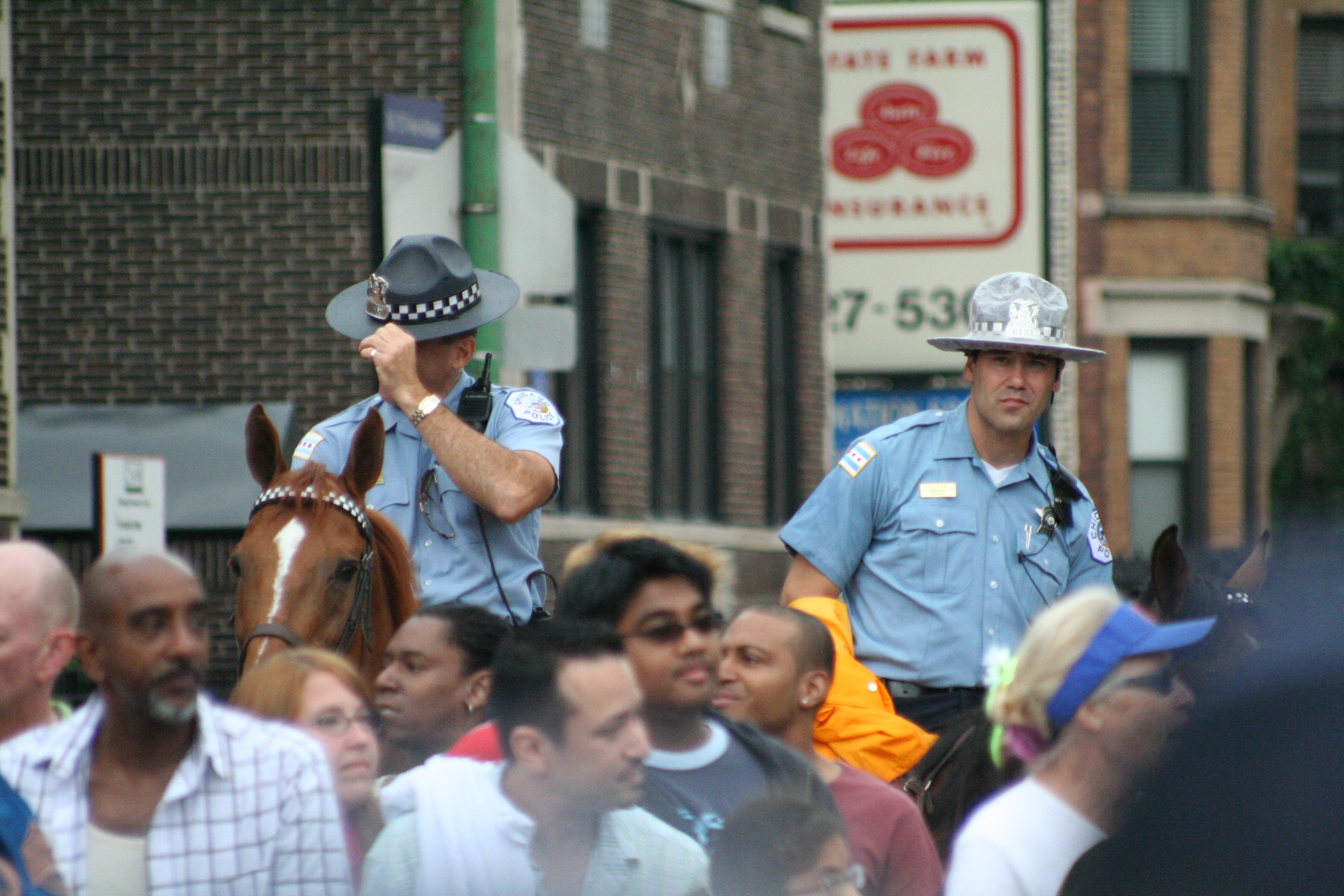
Chicago Police officers with Sillitoe tartan hat bands and horse bridle

- Chicago Police Department's pattern is dark blue and white for patrol officers and detectives, and dark blue and gold for sergeants and higher ranks. Sillitoe tartan caps were introduced in 1967. The band is around not only the department's service caps, but winter knit caps, summer baseball-style caps, the campaign hats and horse bridles of the mounted unit, bicycle helmets, and dog collars as well; it is not worn on the fur trim winter hat nor the light blue riot and motorcycle helmets. The Chicago Police also use the pattern on some signage, graphics, and architectural detail on newer police stations.
- The police of Brookfield, Forest Park, Hillside, and Evergreen Park follow the same colour protocols as nearby Chicago, although Evergreen Park and Hillside use black rather than dark blue, in keeping with their uniforms.
- The Pittsburgh Police use a dark navy blue and gold pattern, in keeping with their uniform colours. The arms of the city of Pittsburgh derive from those of the city's namesake, William Pitt, the Earl of Chatham; both coats of arms display a "fess chequy argent and azure", or a blue and white chequered band across the middle of the shield. The use of the chequered pattern by the Pittsburgh police is thus not only in keeping with the practice of various police departments, but is also a direct reference to the city's coat of arms and flag.
- Whilst not part of their standard uniform, officers from the Joliet Police Department (Illinois) have been noted to wear a green and white chequerboard band around their hats during the Chicago's Saint Patrick's Day Parade.
- In Florida, Deerfield Beach Fire Station 102 use a yellow and red three-tiered Sillitoe tartan pattern on the sides of their rescue ambulance. This pattern is identical to that used by Fire and Rescue NSW.
- The Washington, D.C. police wear Sillitoe tartan on their uniform sleeves as of the late 2010s.

=== Spain ===
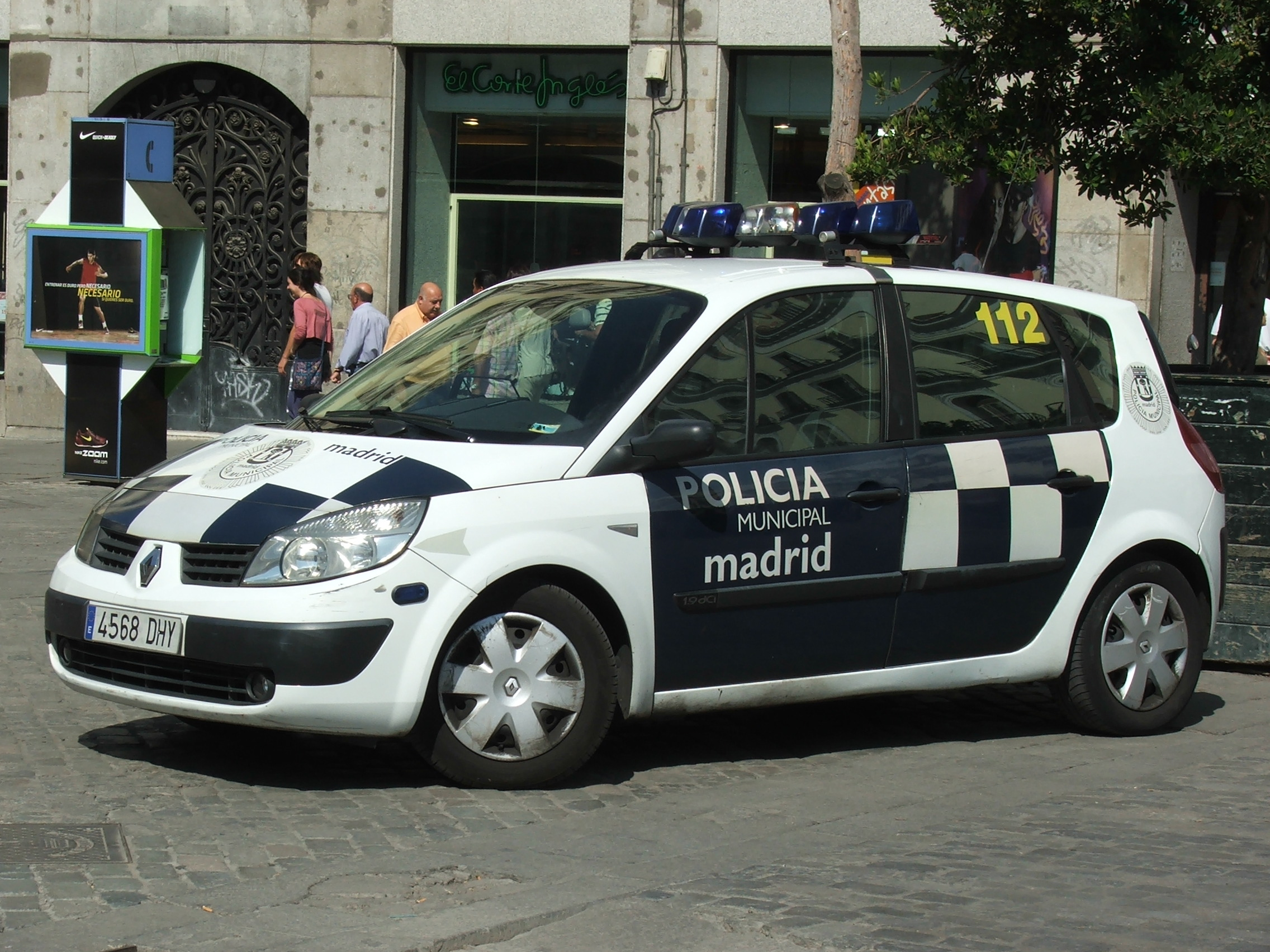
A Spanish police car displaying the Sillitoe tartan.

Blue and white Sillitoe tartan is used by the several local Spanish police forces. Both the Toledo and Mijas local policia use a three-tiered version on vehicles in a fashion very similar to Australian police vehicles. The Ajuntament de Sóller and Barcelona (Guàrdia Urbana) local Policía both use two-tiered blue and white versions.

=== Canada ===
The usage of Sillitoe tartan is typically rare in Canada (except in Quebec) and is usually limited to auxiliary police services. For example, the Toronto Police Auxiliary wear a red and black chequered band on their caps.

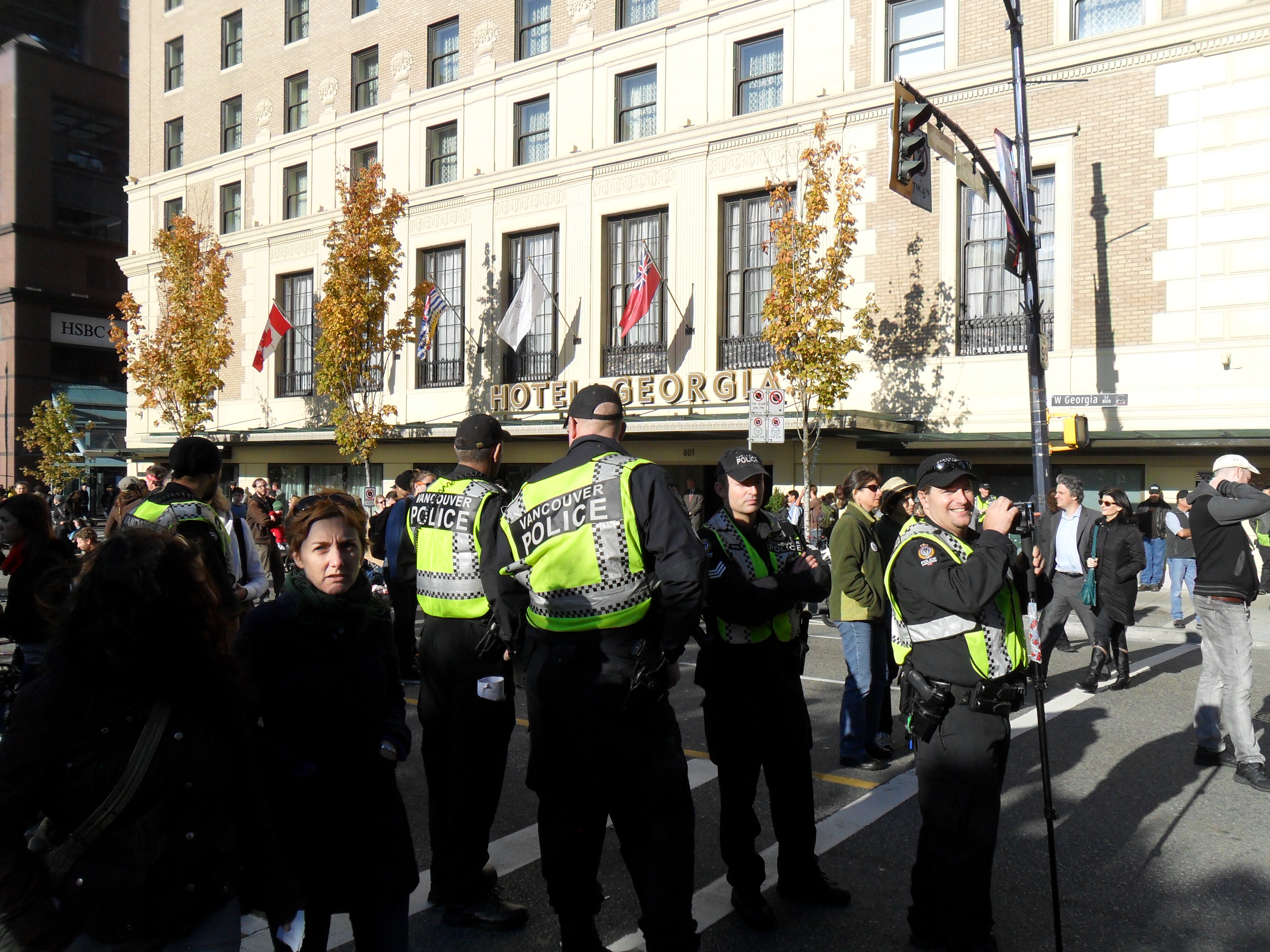
Vancouver Police with Sillitoe tartan on their jackets.

A two-row Chicago-style Sillitoe tartan is borne on the high-visibility vests of the Vancouver Police, Metro Vancouver Transit Police, and other municipal police forces in the Lower Mainland and on Vancouver Island (along the edges of the horizontal and vertical reflective strips), but not on their high-visibility jackets nor other uniforms. The Surrey Police Service use a three-row tartan on their vests and emblem.

==== Quebec ====
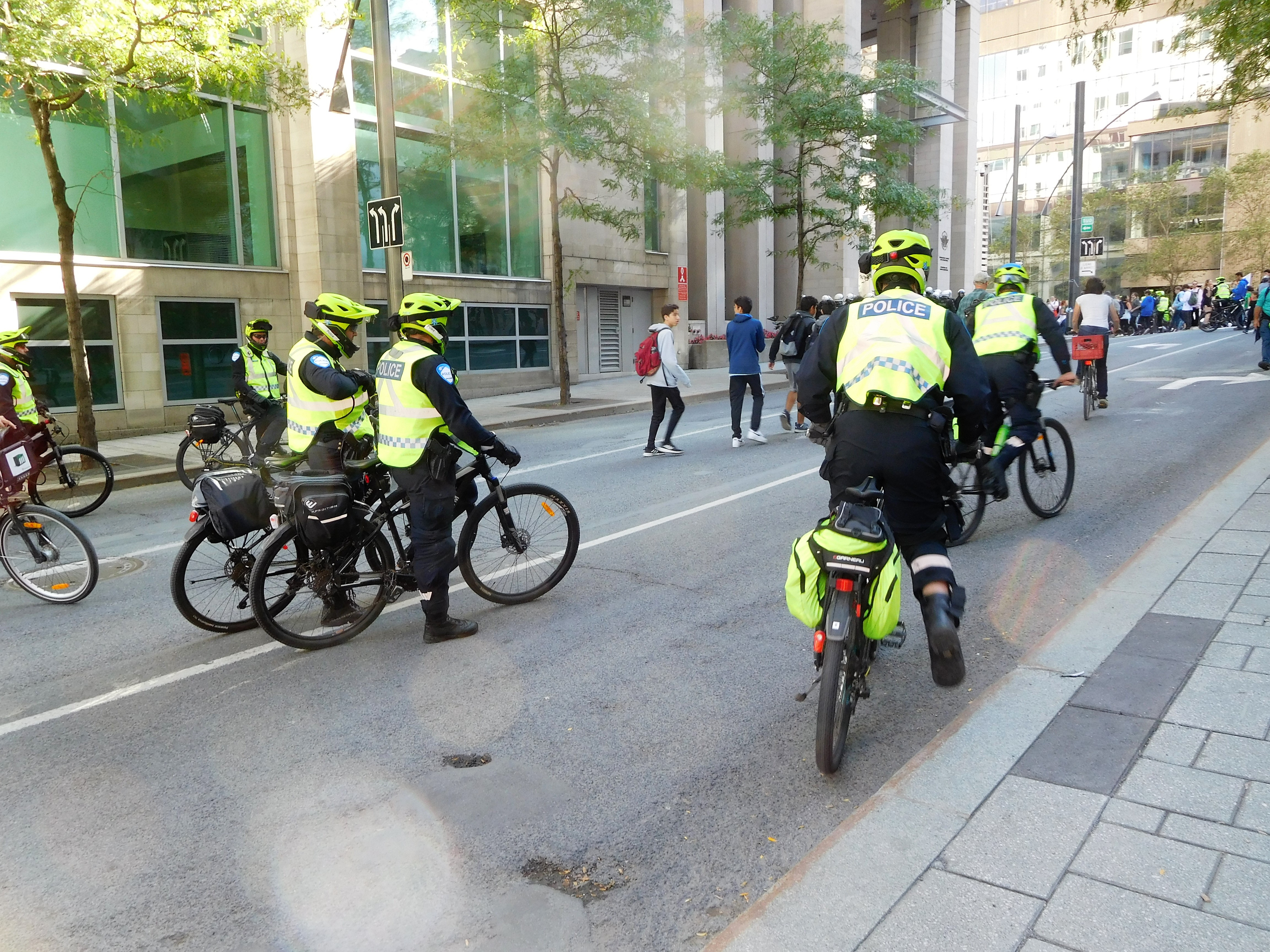
Montréal Police wearing Sillitoe tartan style jackets.

Most of the Quebec police forces use blue-and-white Sillitoe Tartan on their reflective jackets, which feature a similar design to those in the UK. In addition, some EMS vehicles used by the Québec Urgences-santé/Health Emergencies use Sillitoe Tartan markings on the sides.

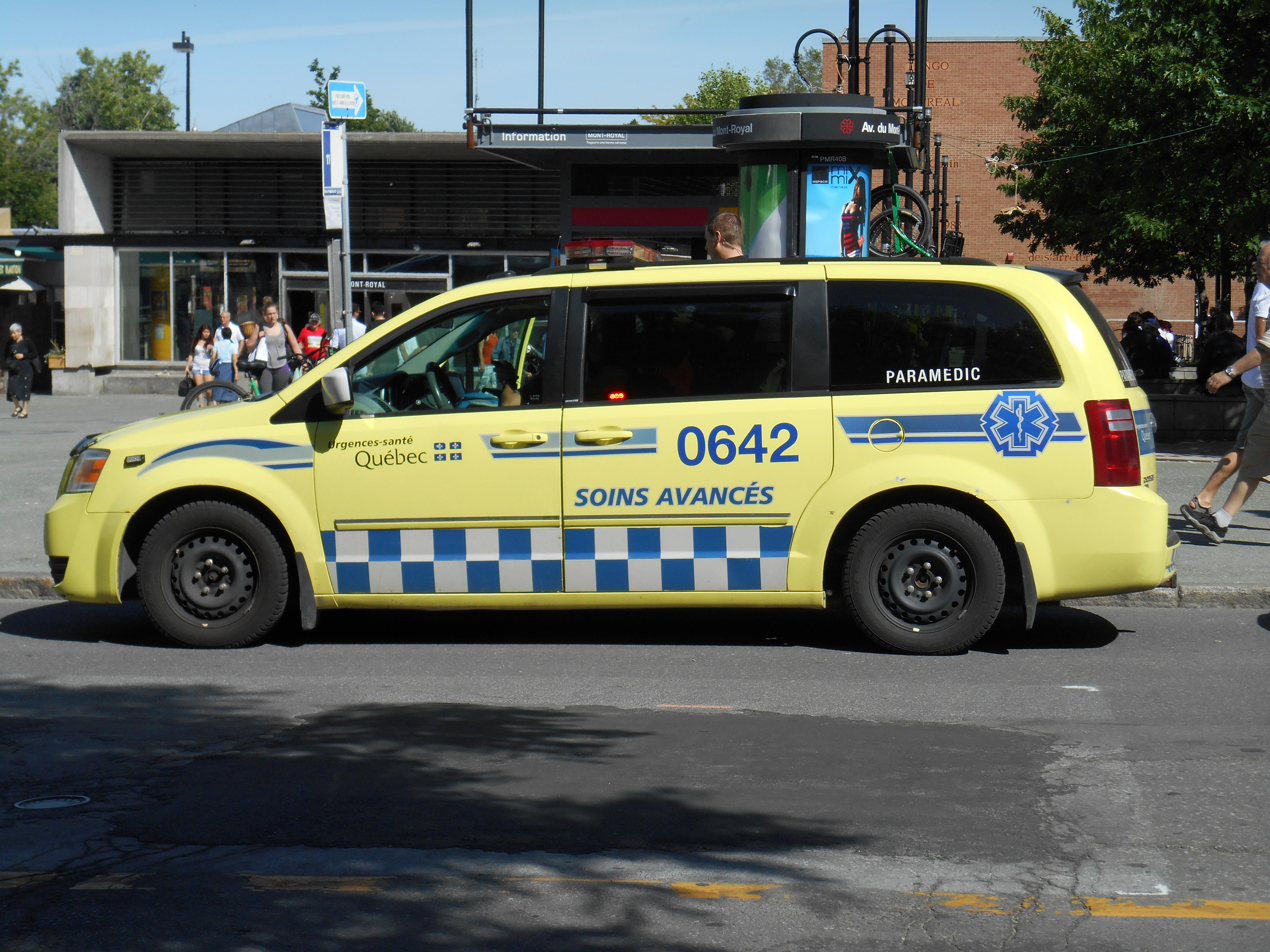
A Dodge Caravan EMS vehicle in Montreal, Québec

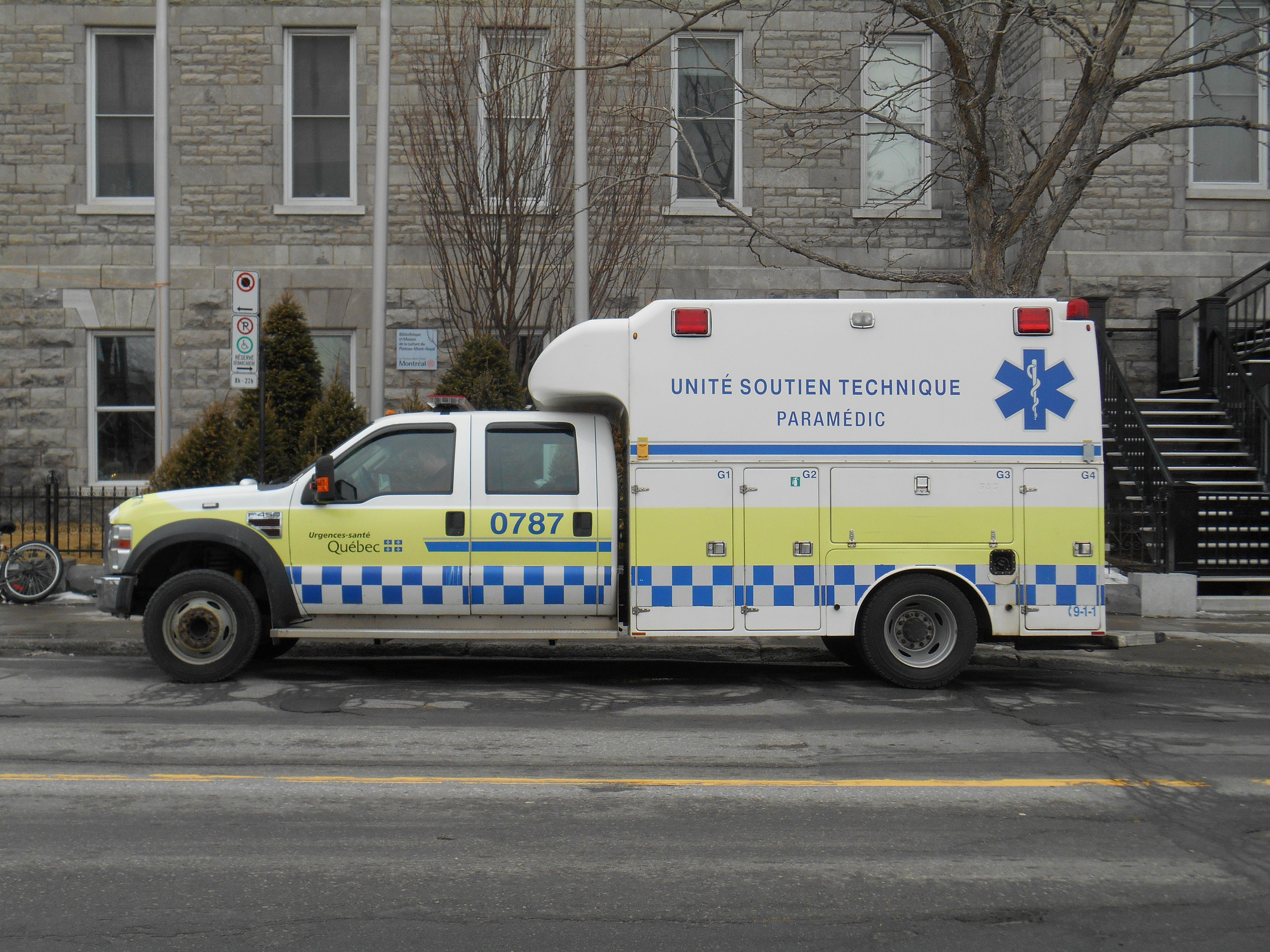
A paramedic truck parked in Montreal

=== China ===
==== Hong Kong ====
The Hong Kong Police Force use, to a limited extent, both two and three-tiered blue and white Sillitoe tartan schemes (Battenburg markings) on traffic vehicles. This pattern appears to be similar to the Australian style of police markings.

=== Brazil ===
Used by some states's Military Polices, including the Military Police of the Federal District, the Military Police of Rio Grande do Norte, the Military Police of Pará, and some Municipal Guards, as the City of São Paulo Metropolitan Civil Guard, which wears a black and white Silitoe Tartan in their peaked caps.

=== Brunei ===
The Royal Brunei Police Force use blue and white Sillitoe tartan on various police vehicles but not on uniforms.

=== Denmark ===
The duty uniforms of the Denmark Politi (Police) feature reflective black and white Sillitoe tartan stripes on the uniform jackets and pants.

=== Iceland ===
The Icelandic Police wear a black-and-white Sillitoe tartan Pattern on shirt and trouser cuffs, lower hems of jackets and on the base of side hats and baseball caps. A blue and yellow pattern is applied as a reflective marking to the lower part of patrol cars as well.

=== Indonesia ===
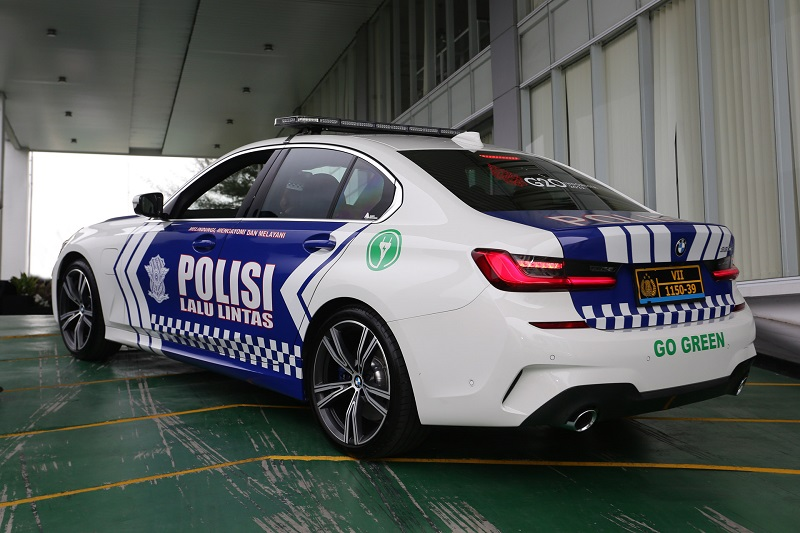
An Indonesian Traffic Police electric car

The Traffic Corps of Indonesian National Police use blue and white Sillitoe tartan markings on uniforms and traffic vehicles.

=== Malaysia ===
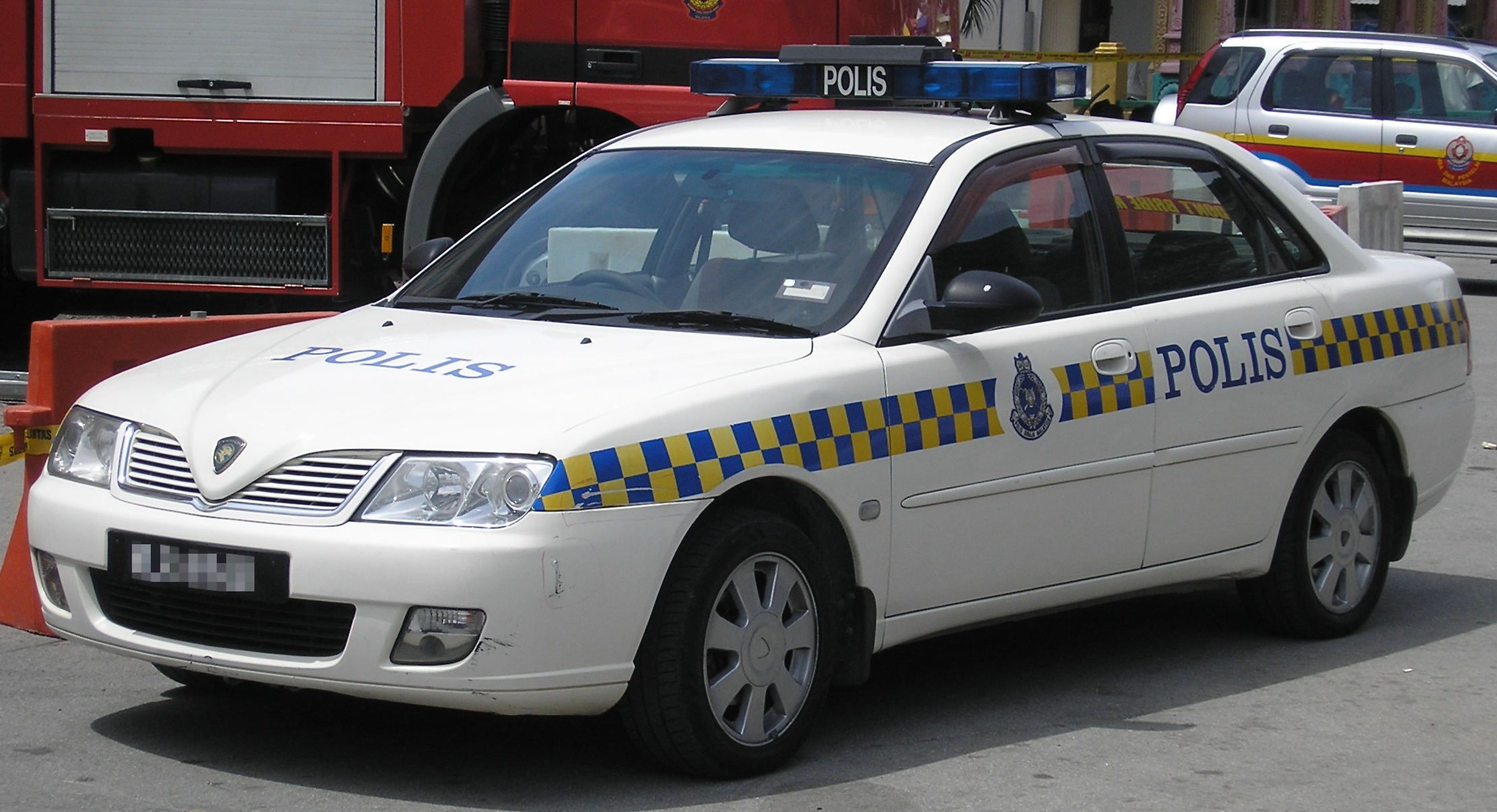
Royal Malaysian Police car

The Royal Malaysia Police use a gold and blue Sillitoe tartan on some patrol vehicles and full pattern on some tow trucks, but not on motorbikes, uniforms, or insignia.

=== Mexico ===
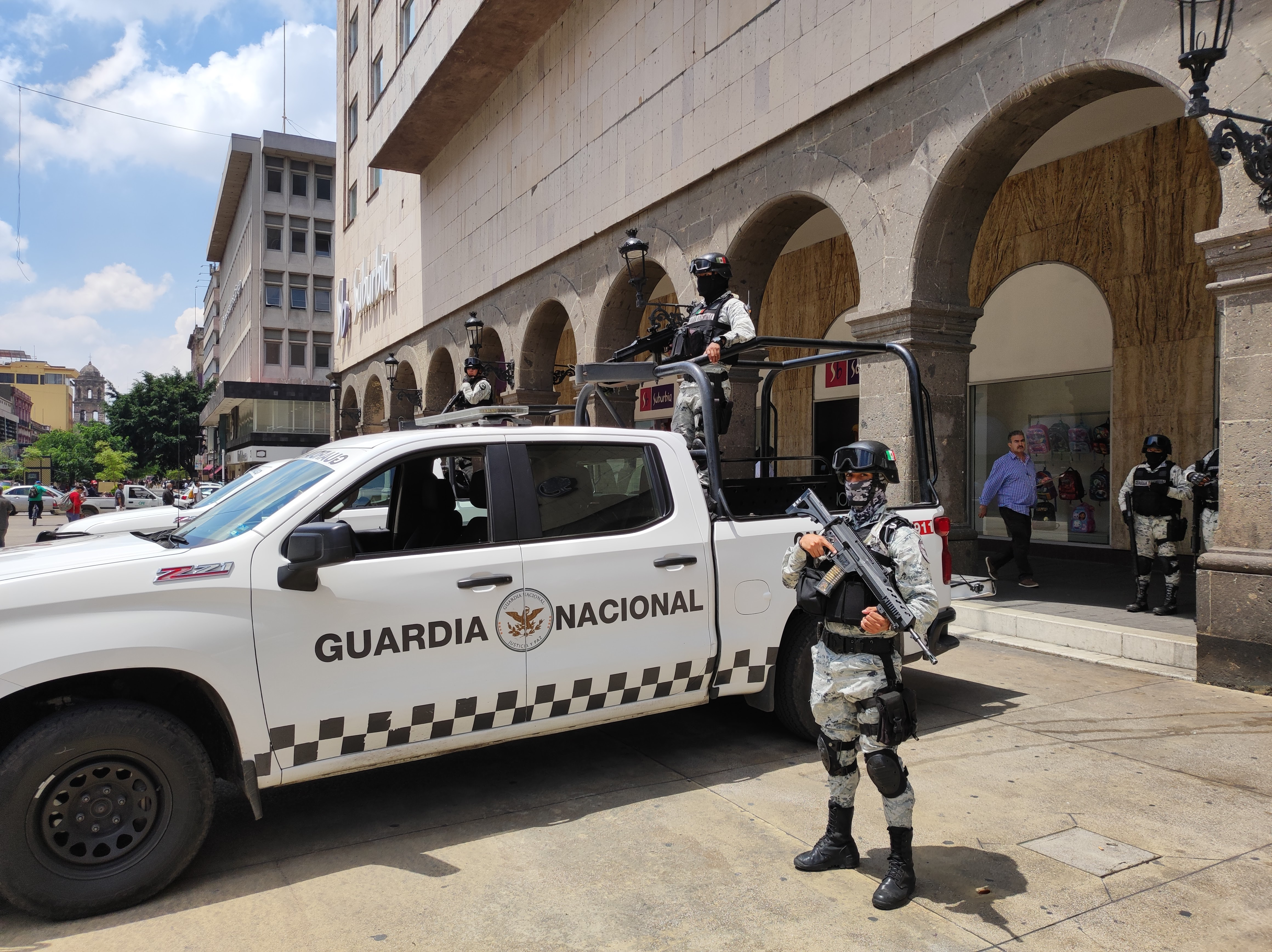
A Guardia Nacional Military truck in Actopan, Mexico

The Guardia Nacional uses black and white Sillitoe tartan markings on all of their fleets, but they are not used on uniforms.

=== Netherlands ===
The plan for a national uniform for local municipal enforcement officers contains the Sillitoe tartan patterns on the cap and shirts, sweaters and jackets on a uniform similar to that of the Spanish local police.

=== Norway ===
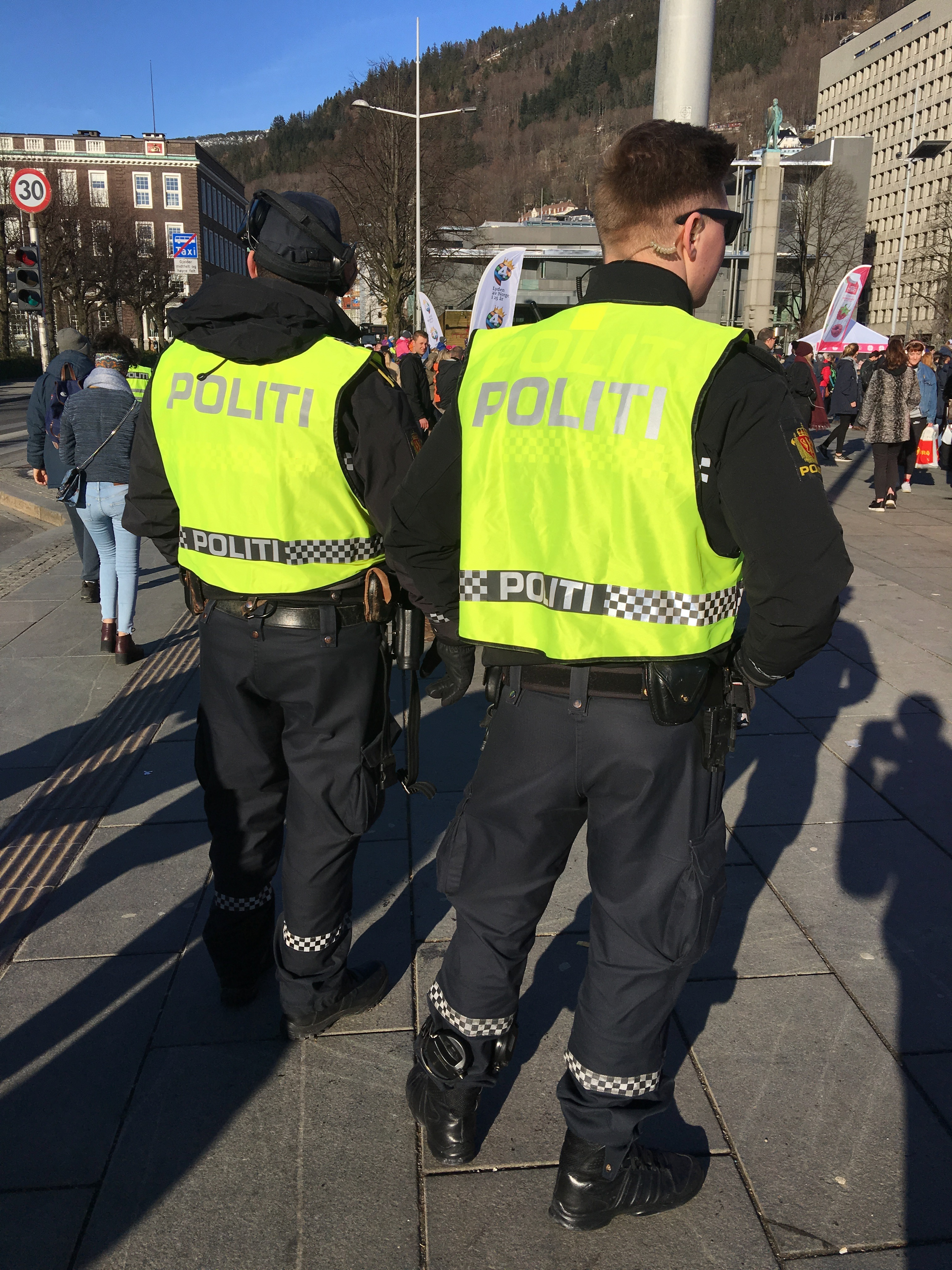
Norwegian police uniforms with black and white Sillitoe tartan chequered markings

The different emergency units of Norway can be distinguished by the colour scheme of the Sillitoe tartan, where the chequer pattern alternates between a colour and reflective white squares.

- Police: matte black and reflective white chequer – Used only on clothing uniform
- Fire brigade: reflective red and reflective white chequer – Used on clothing and vehicle uniform
- Ambulance/paramedics: reflective green and reflective white chequer – Used on clothing and vehicle uniform
- Civil defence: blue and white chequer – Used only on clothing uniform

=== South Africa ===
The Durban Metro Police use the same blue and white Sillitoe tartan pattern as Australia on their vehicles, unlike the police vehicles of other cities in South Africa.

== See also ==
- Battenburg markings
- Black Maria
- Panda car
- Zed-car
- Black and white (police vehicle)
- Jam sandwich (police car)
