= Georgetown University Police Department =

Police department in Washington, D.C.

- Abbreviation: GUPD

Agency overview
- Legal personality: Non-governmental: Body corporate

Jurisdictional structure
- Operations jurisdiction: United States
- Legal jurisdiction: Georgetown University property
- Governing body: President and Directors of Georgetown College
- General nature: Civilian police
- Specialist jurisdiction: Buildings and lands occupied or explicitly controlled by the educational institution and the institution's personnel, public entering the buildings, immediate precincts

Operational structure
- Agency executives: Courtney Ballantine, Chief of Police; Fredinal Rogers, Deputy Chief of Police

Website
- police.georgetown.edu

The Georgetown University Police Department (GUPD) is a campus police department responsible for providing security and law enforcement for Georgetown University's main campus and Medical Center in Washington, D.C., as well as properties owned by the university.

== Overview ==
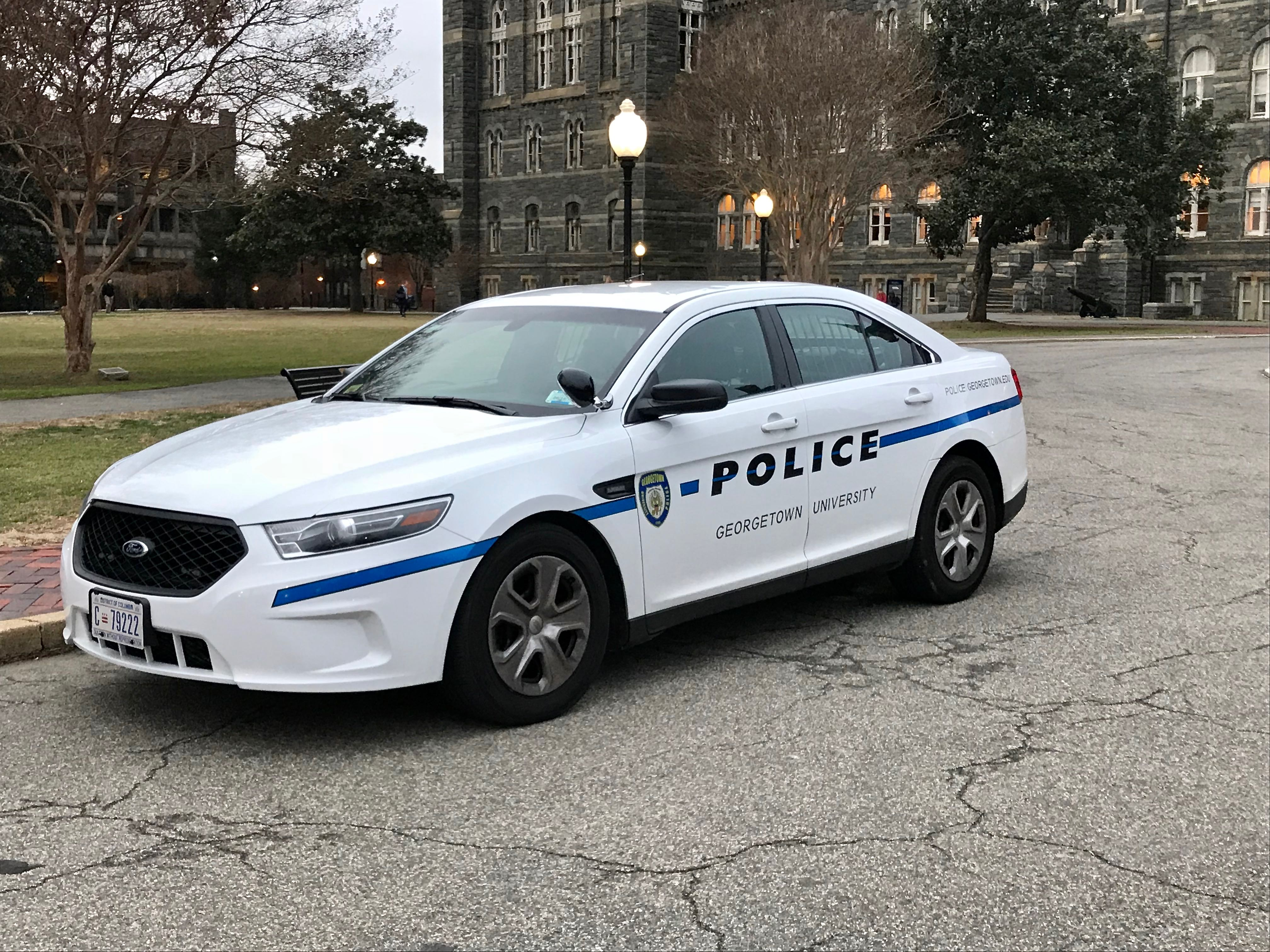
Police cruiser in 2018

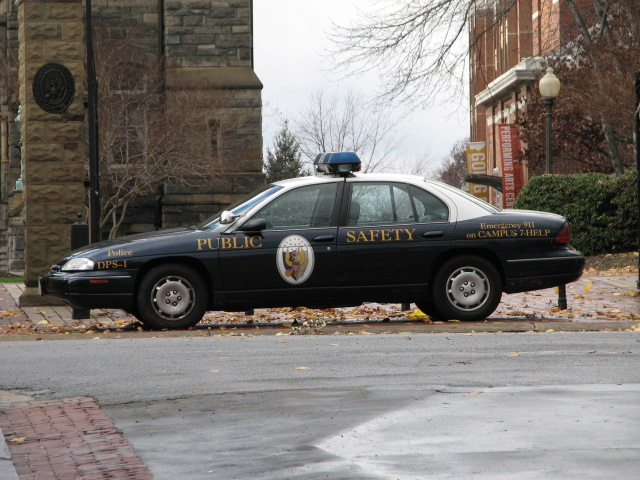
Cruiser from late 1990s

Upon application of the university, the members of the department are commissioned as special police officers by the Mayor of the District of Columbia, whose authority to commission officers derives from § 5–129.02 of the Code of the District of Columbia and which is in turn delegated to the Chief of Police of the Metropolitan Police Department. For this reason, Georgetown police officers have full powers of arrest on campus property.

Officers attend a 3 month academy at the University of the District of Columbia. This academy is attended by most Special University Police Departments in Washington, D.C.

In addition to law enforcement and patrolling the campus by foot, vehicle, and bicycle, the department provides self-defense training to members of the university, security for campus residences and high-profile events, and safety escorts throughout the Georgetown, Burleith, and Foxhall neighborhoods. Until 2013, the Georgetown University Police Department was named the Georgetown University Department of Public Safety (DPS).

The current Chief of Police is Interim Chief of Police Courtney Ballantine, who assumed the position on September 4th, 2025, after Interim Chief of Police / AVP for Public Safety Jay Gruber retired.

Effective February 2, 2026, the Georgetown University Police Department on Georgetown's Hilltop Campus and Department of Public Safety on Georgetown's Capitol Campus will merge into one unified department under the GUPD name.

Rank structure
Chief of Police
Deputy Chief of Police
Captain
Lieutenant
Sergeant
Detective
Master Police Officer
University Police Officer / Special Police Officer
Security Officer
Communications Specialist
Administrative Assistant / Other Civilian Employee
Student Guard

== See also ==
- List of law enforcement agencies in the District of Columbia
