= List of law enforcement agencies in Washington =

List of law enforcement agencies in Washington may refer to:

- List of law enforcement agencies in Washington (state)
- List of law enforcement agencies in Washington, D.C.
