= Chevrolet 9C1 =

Code for police cars manufactured by Chevrolet

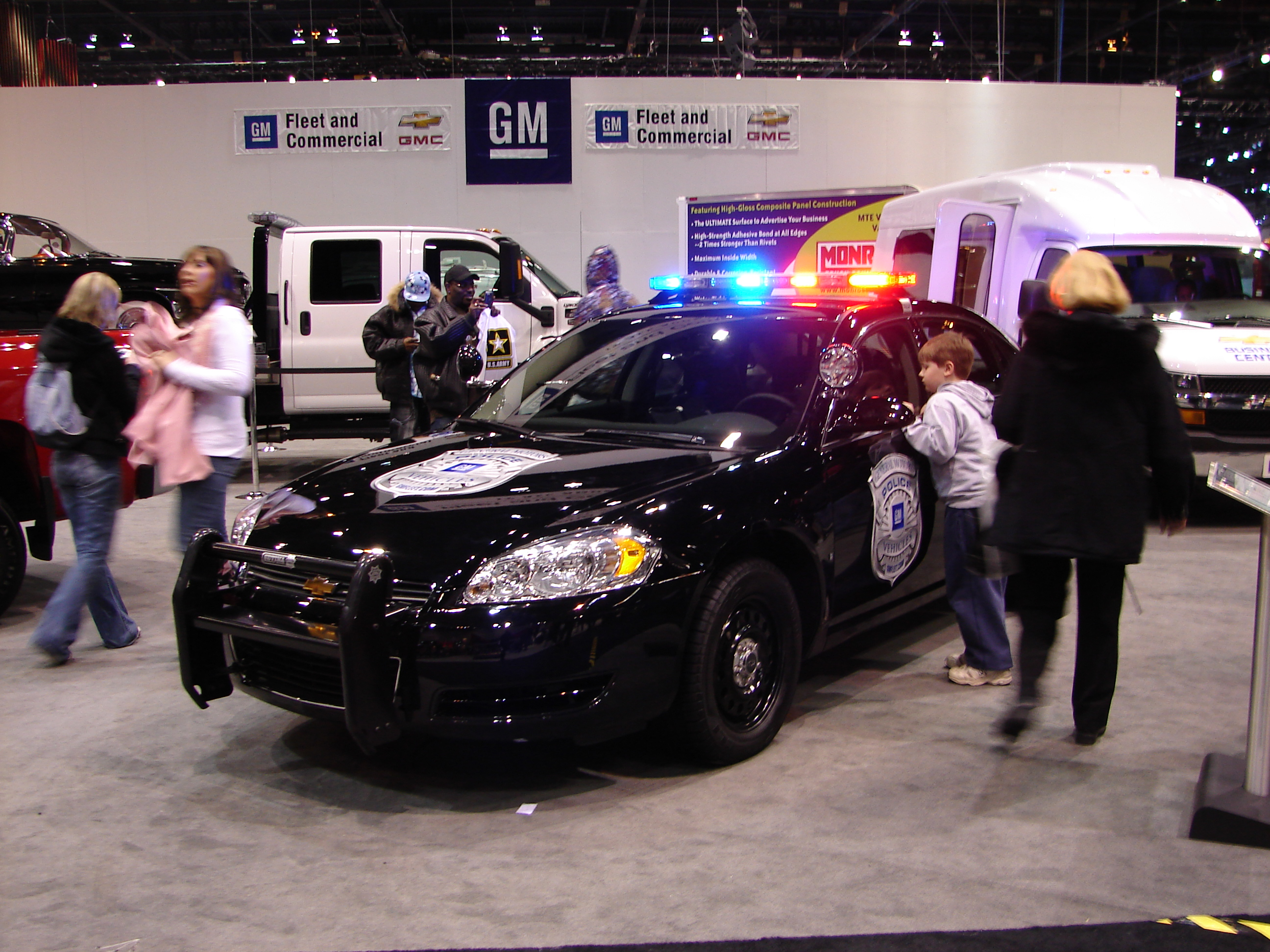
A Chevrolet Impala 9C1 displayed at the 2008 Chicago Auto Show

9C1 is a production code used by Chevrolet to designate a vehicle intended for use as a police car or car-based emergency vehicle. 9C1-designated vehicles are marketed under the Police Pursuit Vehicle or Police Patrol Vehicle (PPV) nameplate. The 9C1 package is intended to compete with the Ford Police Interceptor and Stellantis's Dodge Charger Pursuit and Dodge Durango Pursuit.

Specific modifications and upgrades in the 9C1 package vary by vehicle platform, though they generally center around increased durability and performance. Other parts of the 9C1 package are designed to allow the installation of emergency vehicle lighting and equipment.

Considered a fleet vehicle by General Motors, the 9C1 package is considered a Special Equipment Options (SEO) code, as opposed to a Regular Production Option (RPO) code. Both groups of options are found on the production code sticker (which on most modern GM vehicles is located in the glove box).

== Equipment ==
Heavy-duty (HD) features include full perimeter steel frame (there is debate as to whether the Caprice 9C1 uses a thicker frame than the civilian car; GM replacement frame part numbers for the civilian auto and the Caprice 9C1 are the same); oversized front and rear sway bars; full-size spare tire (in the case of the fourth generation Caprice 9C1); high-output alternator; lifetime-rated green silicone coolant hoses; four-wheel disc brakes; HD steel wheels and speed-rated tires; quick-ratio power steering and transmission and power steering oil coolers; certified digital speedometer; stiffer body mounts and more of them; true dual exhaust; protective anti-stab steel plates in the front seat backs; performance 3.08 final drive ratio (3.23 w/std.); 200 hp/245 ft·lbf L99 V8 4.3 L (265 cid) SFI engine); and extra wiring for the emergency equipment.

== Chevrolet 9C1 models ==
Since the mid-1970s, Chevrolet has offered factory-produced police variants of the Chevrolet Nova, Chevrolet Malibu, Chevrolet Celebrity, Chevrolet Impala, Chevrolet Caprice, Chevrolet Lumina, Chevrolet Tahoe, Chevrolet Silverado, and Chevrolet Blazer EV.

=== Nova 9C1 ===
The Nova 9C1 was offered to police agencies between 1975 and 1979, originating as a prototype for the Los Angeles County Sheriff's Department in 1974. The Nova 9C1 was available to police agencies as either a 2-door coupe or 4-door sedan with an array of different options.

=== Malibu 9C1 ===
A 9C1-equipped Malibu with an LT1 350 Z-28 Camaro V8 engine driven by E. Pierce Marshall placed 13th of 47 in the 1979 Cannonball Baker Sea-to-Shining-Sea Memorial Trophy Dash, better known as the Cannonball Run.

=== Impala/Caprice 9C1 (B-platform) ===
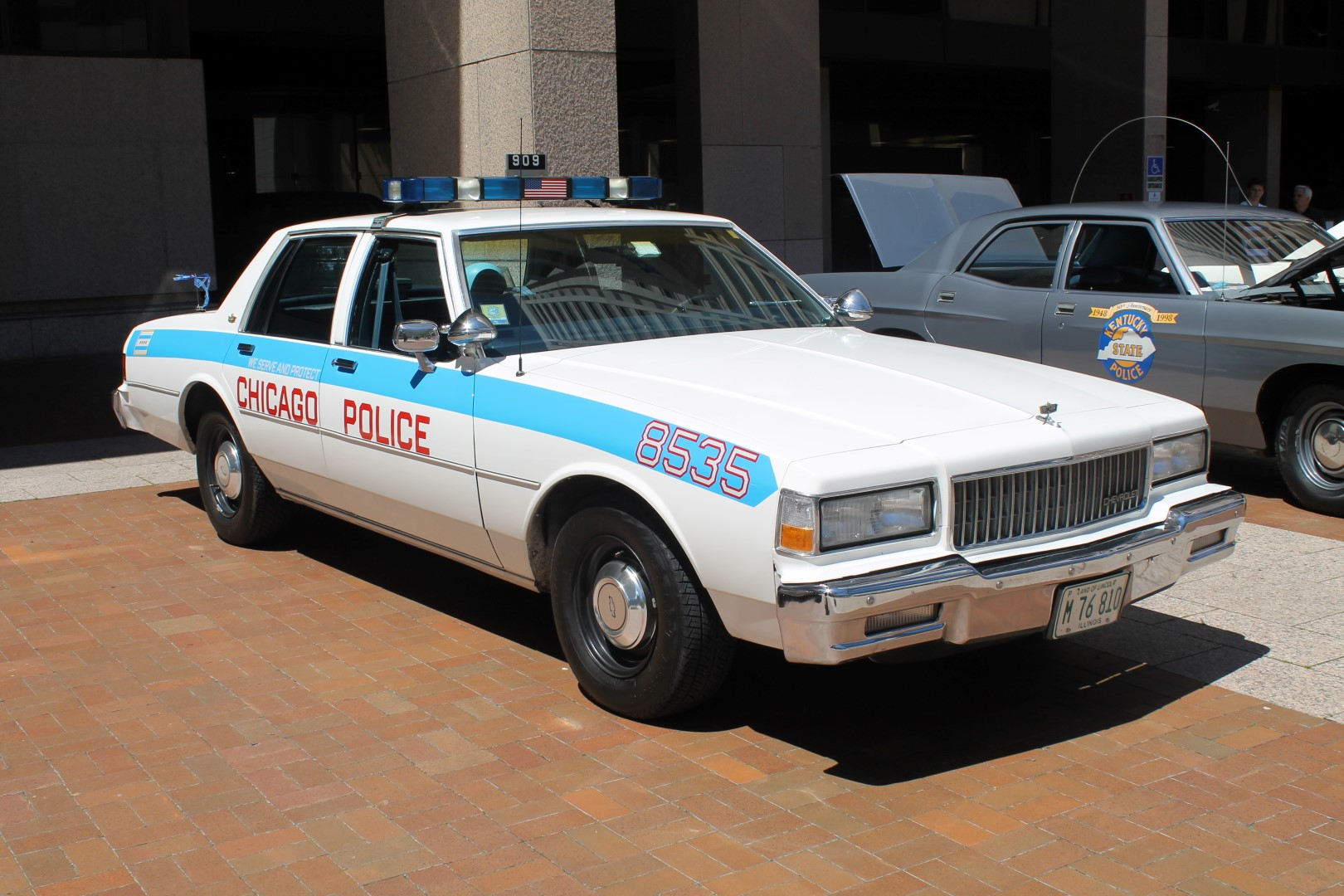
A third-generation Caprice 9C1 used by the Chicago Police Department

Starting in 1986, the Caprice would replace the Impala for the retail, taxi, and police markets based on the third generation model, which was launched in 1977. Like its civilian counterparts, the Caprice 9C1 would get a facelift in 1987, and would remain the same until 1990. The Caprice 9C1 was available with either a V6 or V8 in this generation.

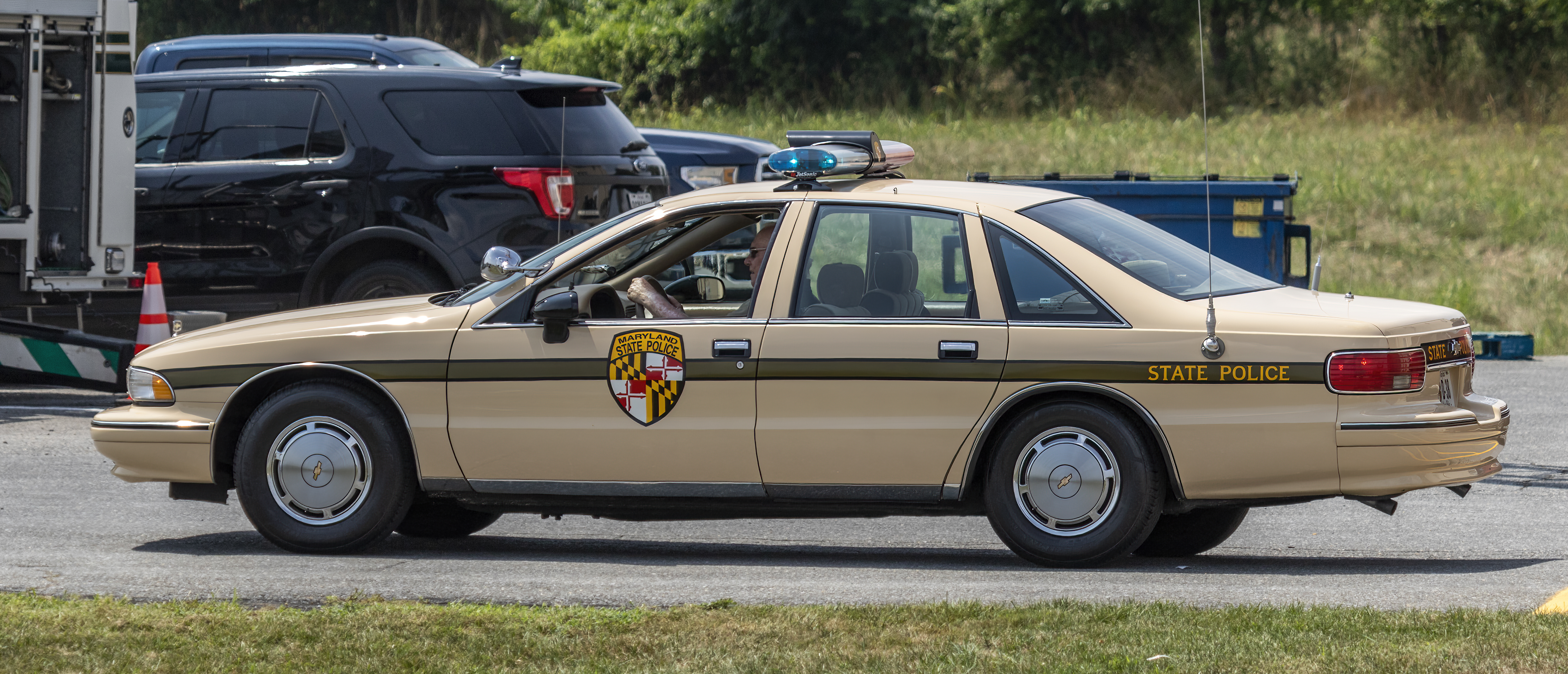
A fourth-generation Caprice 9C1 used by the Maryland State Police

When the fourth generation model was released in 1991, the former V6 was reintroduced for the 1992-93 9C6 taxi packages only and two new choices of V8 were offered for civilian, taxi, and police markets (the 5.0 V8 carried from the former generation and 5.7 V8) and featured a digital instrument cluster unlike its civilian version's analog interface, which would remain until 1993 when the LTZ version was introduced. When the 1993-96 model cars lost its rear fender skirts design, this increased the 9C1's sales and appeal to law agencies, as this feature wasn't popular on the 4th generation Chevrolet Caprice for the 1991-92 model years, 5.7-liter Police 153 kW / 205 hp / 208 PS ( SAE net ), torque: 407 Nm / 300 lb-f.

From 1994 to 1996, the detuned 260 hp (190 kW) LT1 350 c.i. engine found on the fourth generation Chevrolet Corvette was a popular option on the 9C1 (the 4.3 V8 (RPO L99) being standard for police agencies looking for a more fuel efficient option), and standard equipment on other GM B/D-bodies at the time such as the Chevrolet Impala SS, Buick Roadmaster, and Cadillac Fleetwood. However, the 9C1 option was not offered on any of these models.

With General Motors ending production of the fourth generation model Caprice 9C1 in 1996, many police departments across the United States and Canada kept them in service far longer than most other police vehicles from that time period, reasons being for lack of finding a good enough equivalent for replacement with decent fuel mileage for its large size, high horsepower, affordable sales pricing, and reliability. The need for a police full-size sedan in North America was fulfilled with the Ford Crown Victoria Police Interceptor and the Dodge Charger Pursuit.

=== Caprice 9C1 (V-platform) ===
In 1999, the Caprice 9C1 name would be revived for the Middle East, based on the Holden Caprice from the WH Statesman/Caprice range for the 2000 model year. This same police package was used in the VT Commodore range at the time which was also sold in the Middle Eastern market as the Lumina. The same range of Holden Caprice almost got imported in North America right around the time that the Impala 9C1 based on the 8th generation Impala in FWD form was about to hit the police market.

=== Impala 9C1 (W-platform) ===
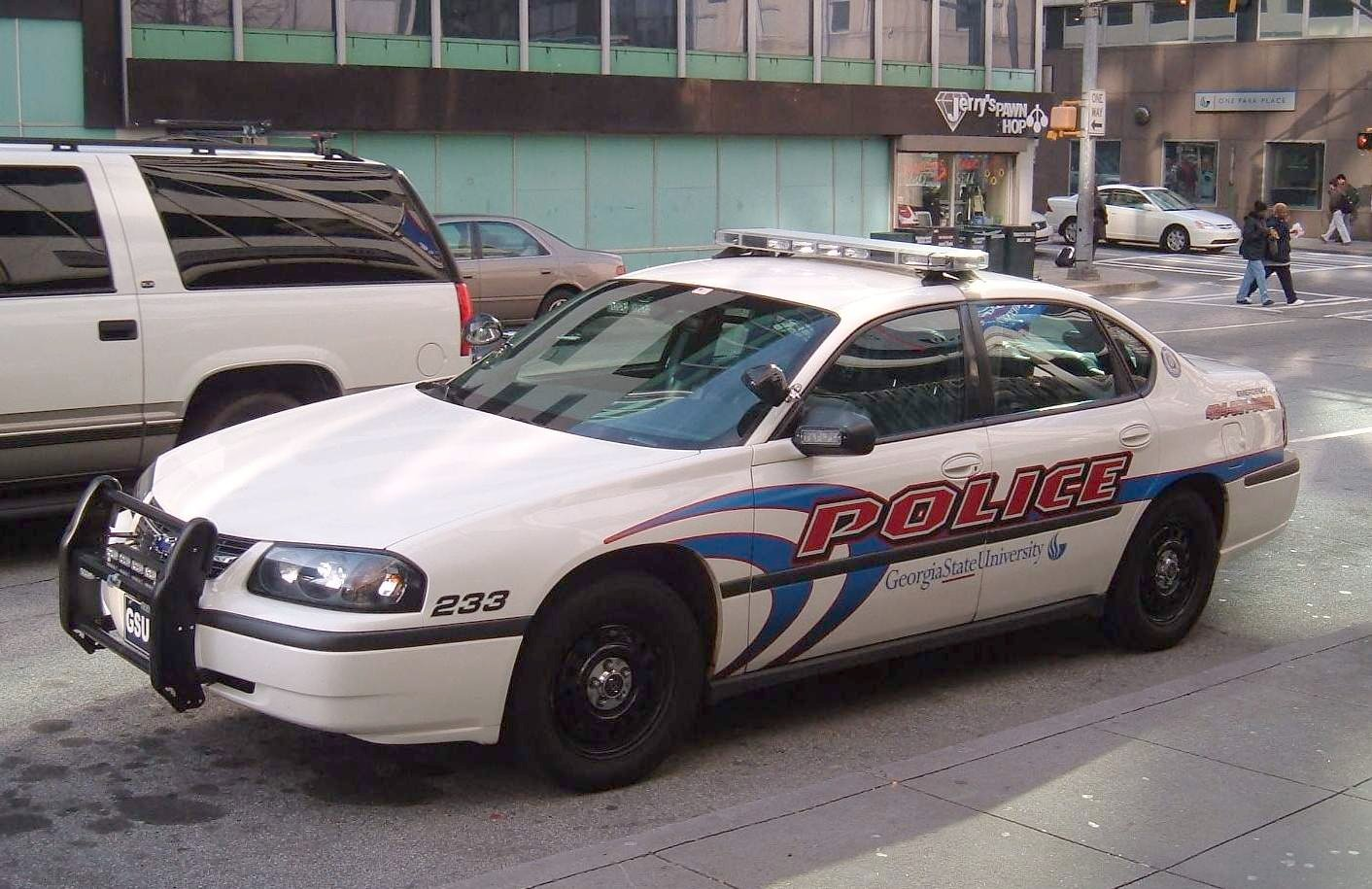
An eighth-generation Impala 9C1 used by the Georgia State University Police Department

Designed in 1999, the Impala 9C1 police package was offered with the 2000 to 2005 8th generation Impala and 2006-2013 9th generation Impala/2014-2016 Impala Limited in FWD form. The 9th generation model would be the last W-body vehicle in production until it was discontinued in 2016.

The eighth generation W body Impala was powered by the 3.8L Buick V6 engine. The 3.8L V6 was mated to a heavy duty four-speed 4T65-E HD transmission and made 200 horsepower at 5,200 rpm and 200 lb-ft of torque at 4,000 rpm. Mechanically, the 8th generation 9C1 featured many upgrades over the standard Impala including auxiliary oil coolers for the engine oil, power steering, and transmission, a heavy duty radiator with heavy duty fans and extended life coolant, heavy duty front struts, heavy duty shock absorbers, police calibrated brakes, heavy duty front brake pads, and a 125 amp alternator. The 8th generation 9C1 had a 0-60 time of 9.2 seconds and a top speed of 124 mph. Also, traction control was not available on the 9C1. The interior featured several features not available on civilian Impalas including stab-proof front seatbacks, heavy duty front seats, a 100 amp auxiliary power point in the trunk, and "Surveillance Mode"; which was a button that disabled all interior lights to allow officers to hide themselves better. The 9C1 featured a standard AM/FM radio, standard dual zone climate control, a standard driver side torso airbag (2005), and lockout protection; which prevents the driver from locking the keys in the ignition in the event someone tries to lock the doors. This generation 9C1 was very popular with large urban police forces such as the New York City Police Department.

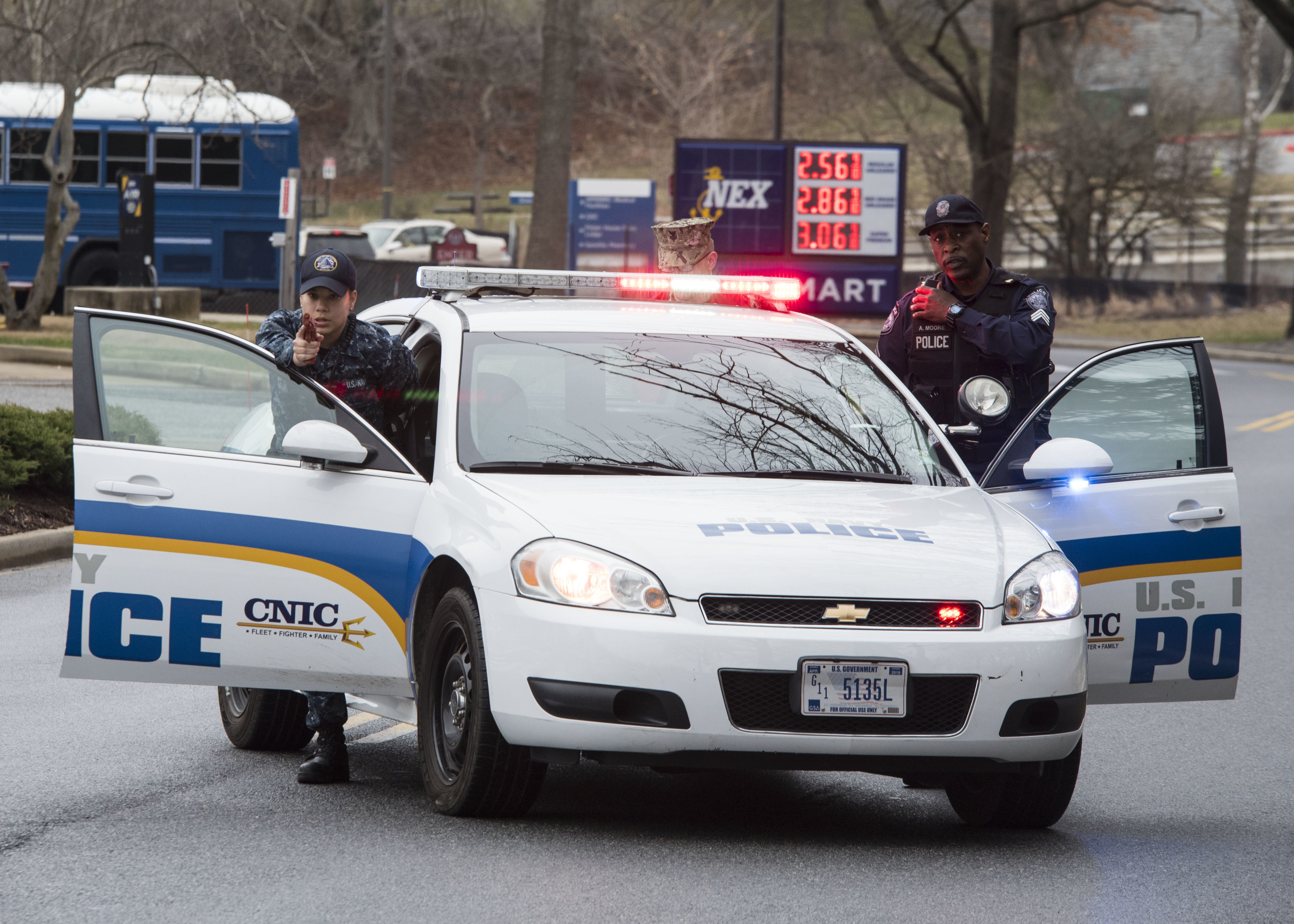
A ninth-generation Impala 9C1 used by the U.S. Department of the Navy Police

The Chevrolet Impala was re-designed for the 2006 model year, once again riding on the W-body platform. The 9C1 was also included in the redesign, and it received significant upgrades over the previous generation. For the 9th generation, the 9C1 was based on the LS trim. A 3.9L GM High Value Engine V6 was now the standard and only powerplant, making 242 horsepower and 242 ft-lb of torque. It was mated to a 4T65-E HD transmission, which was carried over from the previous generation. 0-60 time was improved at 8.4 seconds, as was top speed at 139 mph. The steel wheels were also a carryover from the 8th generation Impala 9C1, as were the optional hubcaps. Traction control was once again unavailable on the 9C1 model. The new 9th generation Impala 9C1 featured dual power seats, automatic headlights, cruise control, keyless entry, tire pressure monitor, digital speedometer readout, reinforced front seat frames with a center-mounted crush box, and side curtain airbags (which could also be deleted as an option). Like the 8th generation 9C1, the 9th generation version had auxiliary coolers for the engine oil, power steering, and transmission, heavy-duty police calibrated ABS brakes, a heavy duty 4 wheel independent suspension, and a heavy duty cooling system; this time based on the cooling system from the 9th generation Impala SS. Additionally, the alternator was upgraded to a heavy duty 150 amp unit and the battery was upgraded to a larger 720cca unit. Furthermore, dual exhaust was now standard. For 2007, engine output was reduced to 233 hp and 240 ft-lbs of torque. 2007 models also saw the addition of GM's Active Fuel Management as standard equipment, which shuts off a bank of cylinders to preserve fuel. In 2008, the 9C1 became Flex Fuel capable in a move to compete with the Ford Crown Victoria Police Interceptor. 2008 models also saw the addition of an external trunk lock tumbler. Engine output was once again reduced in 2009 to 224 hp and 235 lb-ft of torque, and 9C1's now featured standard dual zone automatic climate control; which would be deleted after 2010.

The biggest updates to the 9th generation 9C1 came in 2012. The 3.9L V6 was dropped in favor of a much more powerful 3.6L LFX V6. The new 3.6L V6 made 300 hp and 262 lb-ft of torque, and was mated to a six speed automatic transmission. 0-60 time was drastically improved at 7.2 seconds, and the 9C1 now had a top speed of 150 mph. For the first time, electronic stability control was standard on the 9C1. The 2012 9C1 also received larger, 17 inch steel wheels with front brake ventilation via the fog light housings. The front fascia also received a minor refresh in line with the civilian model Impala, which brought SS style upper and lower front grilles to the 9C1. In addition, the rear fascia now had body color trim compared to the chrome on previous models. For 2014, GM released the 10th generation Impala. The 10th generation Impala did not offer a 9C1 version, but the 9th generation Impala 9C1 remained in production alongside the 10th generation Impala with "Limited" badging. In 2016, the 9th generation 9C1 was discontinued. This generation 9C1, like the 8th generation version, was also very popular with inner city police departments.

=== Caprice PPV ===
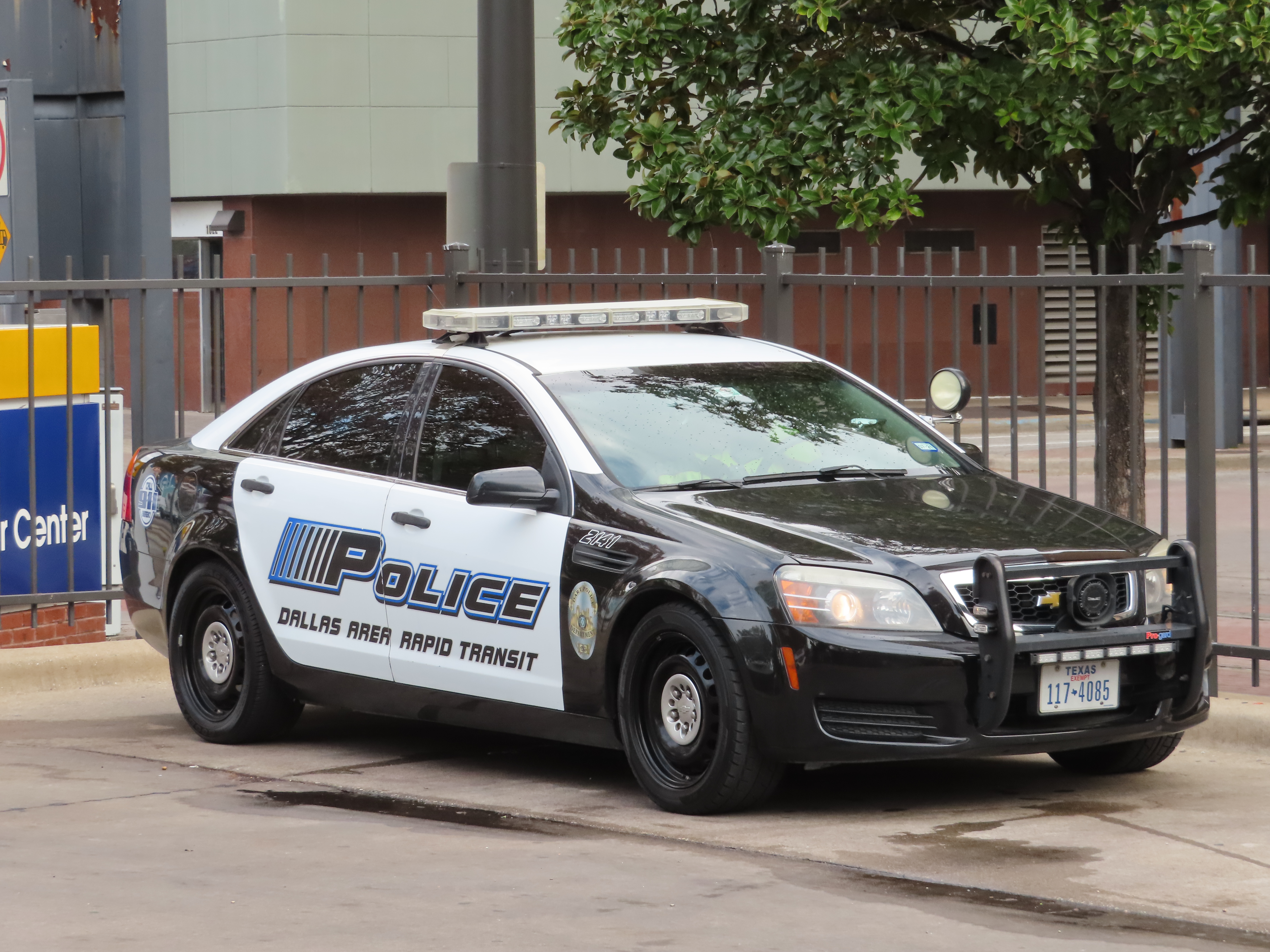
A sixth-generation Caprice PPV used by the Dallas Area Rapid Transit Police Department

Replacing the Impala, the Caprice PPV was manufactured by Holden in Australia, a left-hand drive version of the Holden WM/WN Caprice exported to North America. Introduced for 2011, the PPV was offered exclusively for sale to law enforcement. The 9C1 package made its return, denoting patrol-ready versions, deleting the standard center console (for police computers), handbrake (for a footbrake), and adding vinyl flooring. In 2012, a 3.6L V6 was introduced as a standard engine, with the 6.0L V8 becoming an option (the first time since 1990 that a V6 was offered in a Caprice).

The Caprice PPV was offered with a 9C3 package from 2011 to 2013, denoting unmarked models, largely based on the Middle East export trim Caprice LS with "Westernized" features where necessary and the Holden Caprice's gear shifter and hand brake. Following the introduction of the WN Caprice for 2014, all PPVs adopted the 9C1 package, with the update including a column-mounted transmission shifter. Coinciding with the closure of Australian manufacturing operations by General Motors after the 2017 model year, the Holden/Chevrolet Caprice ended production without a successor.

While not directly offered to sale outside of law enforcement, some initial examples of the Caprice PPV were purchased from General Motors as used cars by virtue of factory demonstrators being cycled out by the company, surplus unsold dealer inventory, and special one-time purchases (usually by fleet upfitters for equipment demonstration use).

=== Tahoe PPV ===
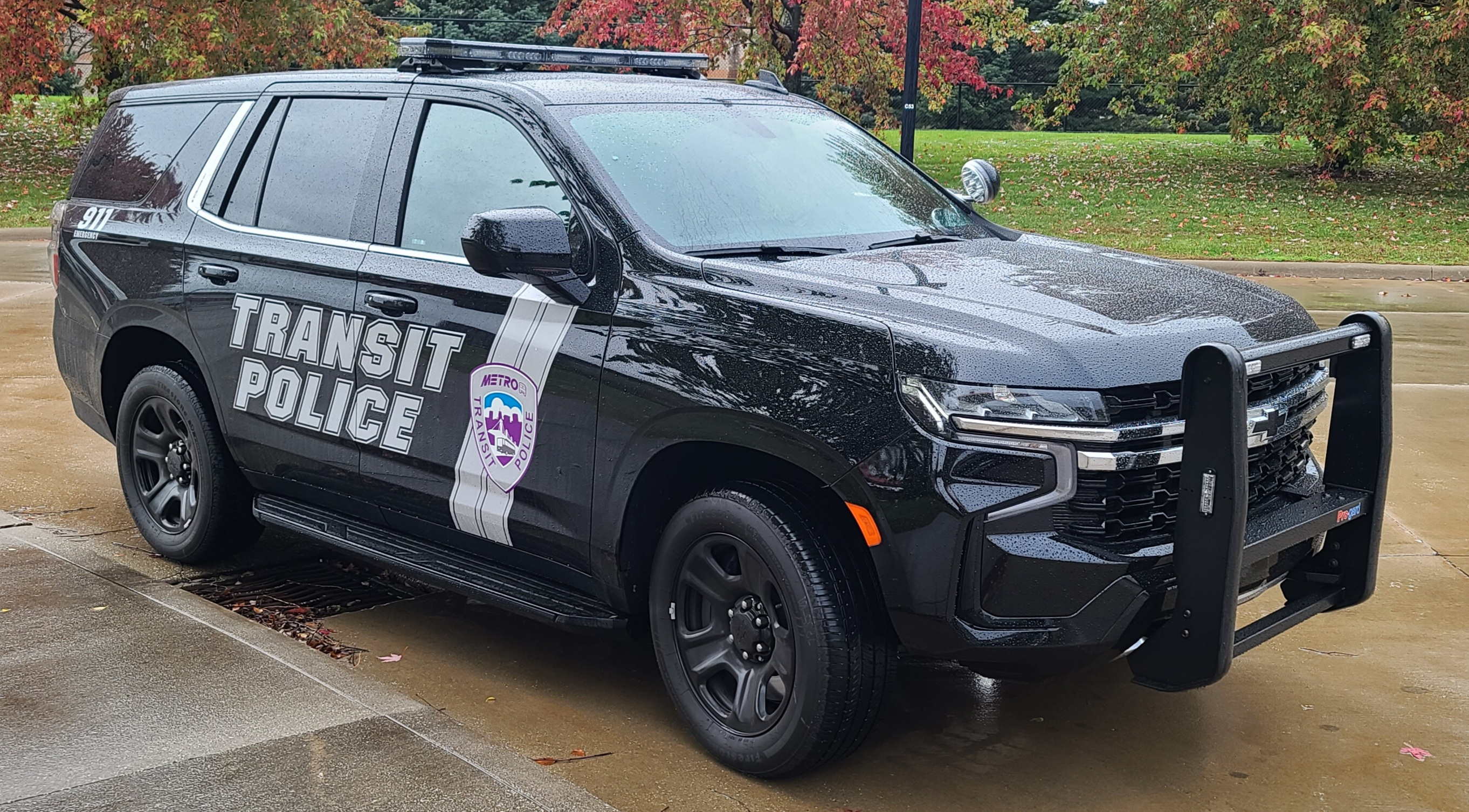
A fifth-generation Tahoe PPV used by the Akron METRO RTA Transit Police Department

In 2021, the Tahoe PPV was assigned the 9C1 production code for the first time; all previous police versions of the Tahoe used the Z56 production code. Features for the Tahoe 9C1 include rocker covers borrowed from the GM LT4 engine, PPV-specific engine and transmission coolers, Firestone Firehawk Pursuit tires on 20-inch steel wheels, Brembo brakes, a lowered fortified suspension, standard rear-wheel drive with optional four-wheel drive, a higher-output alternator, and a limited slip clutch in the transfer case.

=== Blazer EV PPV ===
In 2022, Chevrolet announced the Chevrolet Blazer EV would be receiving a PPV variant in 2024. It is the first police-certified vehicle produced by Chevrolet, and features skid plates, Firestone Firehawk Pursuit tires on 20-inch steel wheels like found on both the Tahoe 9C1 PPV & Silverado 9C1 PPV, Protected Idle features for long-term idling, vinyl floor coverings, and equipment support.

=== Silverado PPV ===
In 2022, Chevrolet announced that the Silverado was given an 9C1 variant as the Silverado PPV making it the first pursuit rated pickup for Chevrolet as a 2023 model.

== Holden Commodore 9C1 ==
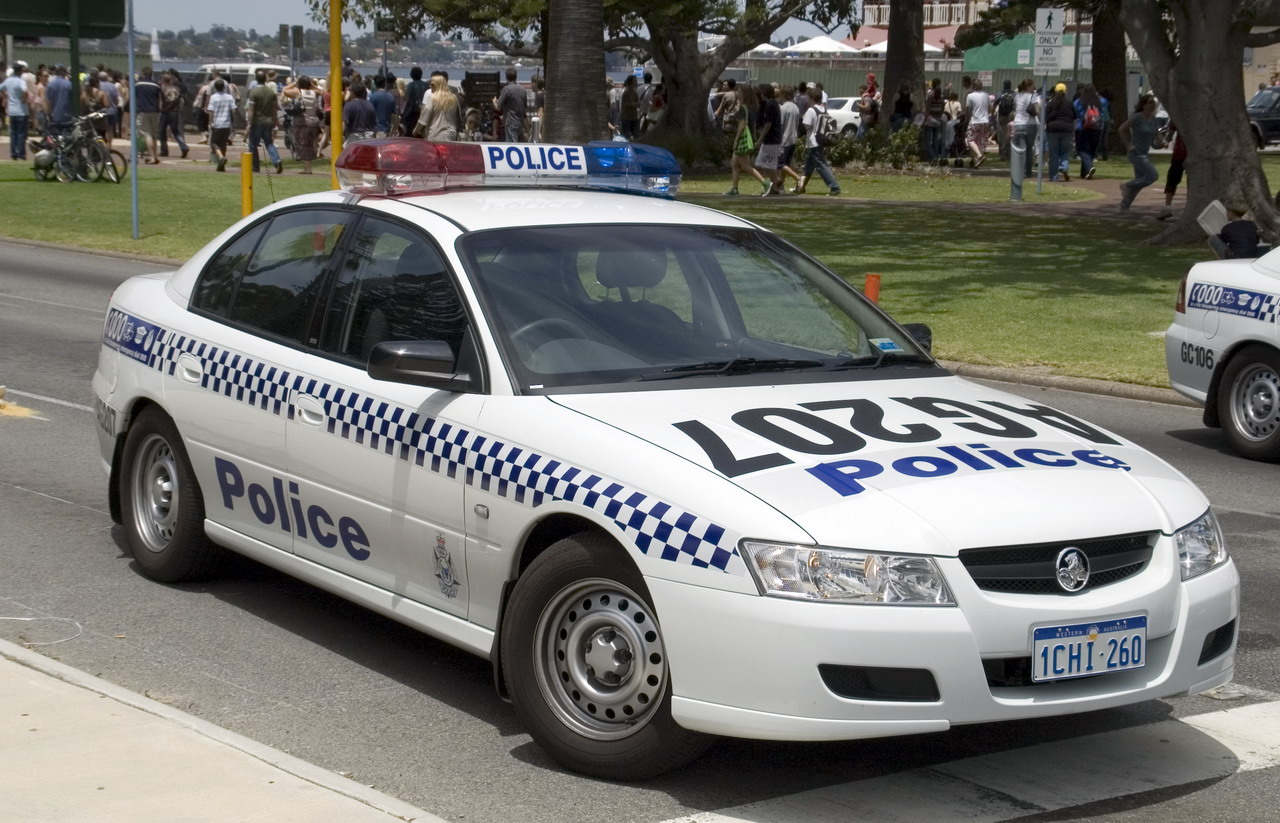
A Commodore (VZ) Executive 9C1 used by the Western Australia Police Force

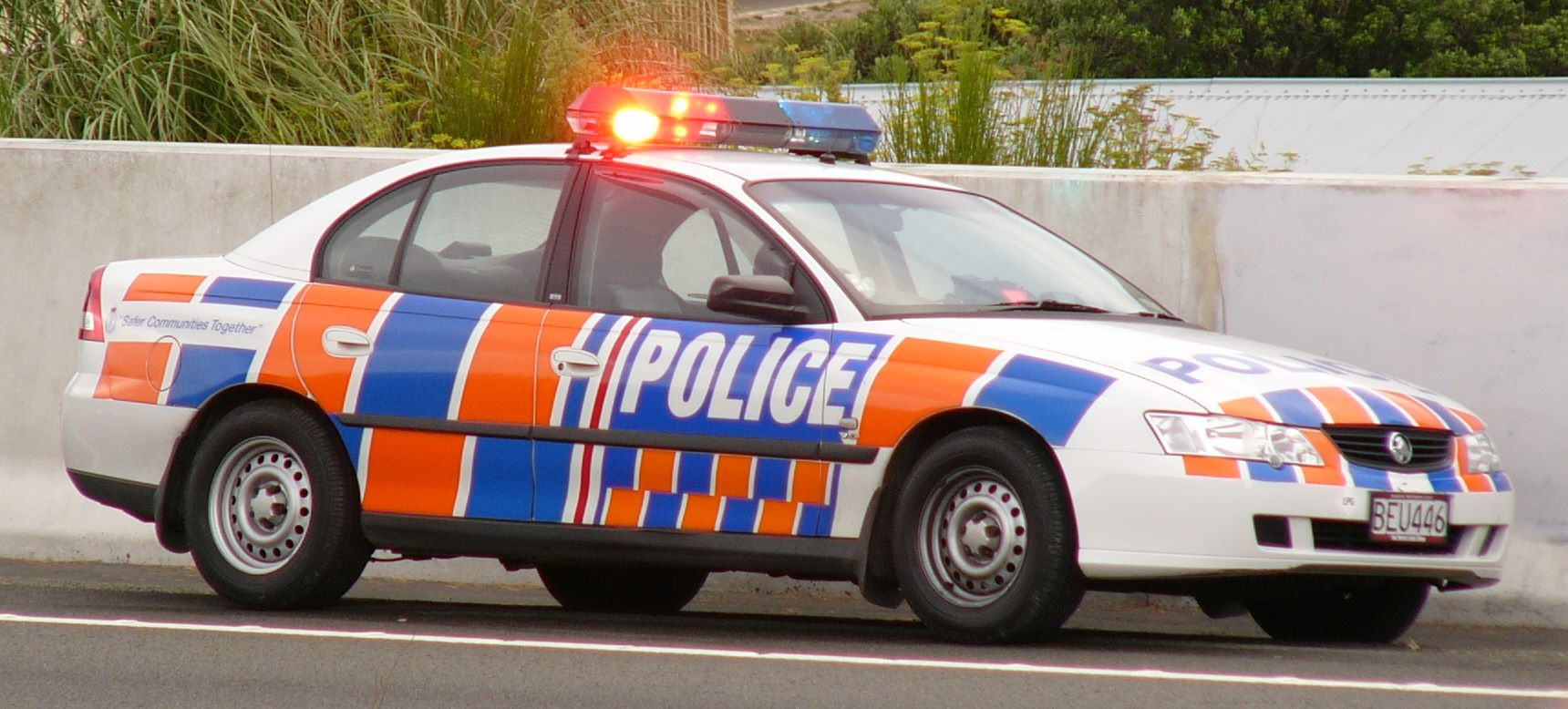
A Commodore (VY) Executive 9C1 used by the New Zealand Police

The 9C1 name was also offered with the Holden Commodore starting with the 1997 Holden Commodore (VS) and ending with the 2004-2006 Holden Commodore (VZ) by GM's Australian affiliate Holden. The VZ Commodore 9C1 (or VZ Commodore Police Pack) was available to all police organisations in Australia, New Zealand, and the Middle East as the Lumina 9C1. It was based on the Commodore Executive and added various specification upgrades to cater to the needs of police. Most 9C1s were delivered in white, but other colours were available if needed, and were predominantly used for unmarked cars.

== Chevrolet Lumina 9C3 ==
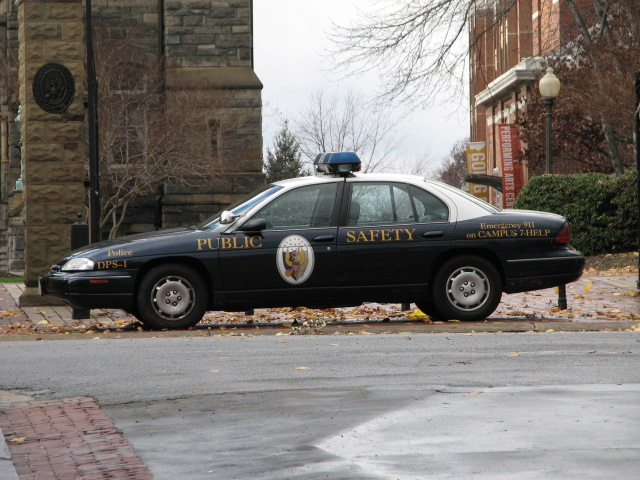
A second-generation Lumina 9C3 used by the Georgetown University Police Department

The 9C3 package is a variant of the 9C1 package intended for Detective/unmarked or supervisor use. It typically features a more consumer-oriented interior. The 9C3 package was first offered with the Chevrolet Lumina in 1992, and has been available for all 9C1 vehicles offered since then. Both the 8th & 9th generation Impalas from 2001-2005 & 2006-2016, & the 2011-2013 3rd generation Holden WM II Caprice based 6th generation Caprice in the past were offered with the 9C3 code for detective, unmarked, & supervisor. The Blazer EV PPV is offered with the 9C3 code for the first time since the 2013 Caprice, like the Caprice 9C3 it also has a civilian style console.
