= District of Columbia Protective Services Division =

Police division in Washington, D.C.

- Common name: DC Protective Services
- Abbreviation: PSD
- Motto: Justitia Omnibus "Justice For All"

Agency overview
- Formed: 1899 Municipal Watchmen

Jurisdictional structure
- Operations jurisdiction: Washington D.C., District of Columbia, United States
- Legal jurisdiction: District of Columbia

Operational structure
- Police Officers: 70 police officers
- Civilian employees: 12 civilian employees
- Agency executive: Larry "Nero" Priester
- Parent agency: DC Department of General Services

Website
- dgs.dc.gov/page/dgs-protective-services-division

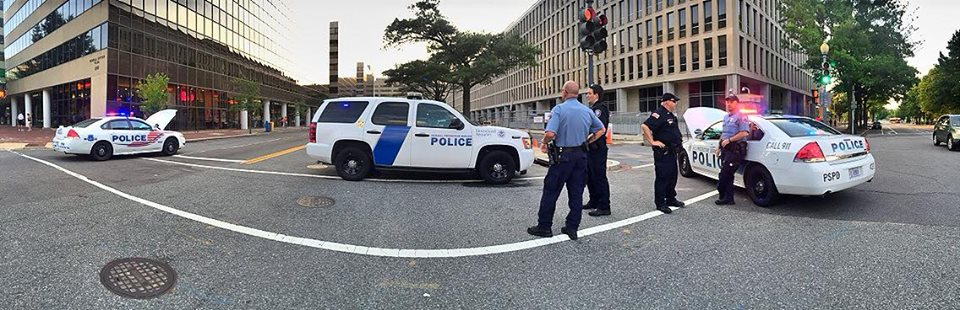
A PSD unit, along with MPDC and FPS units holding the perimeter of a major incident in the Southwest Government Center area of DC in June 2015.

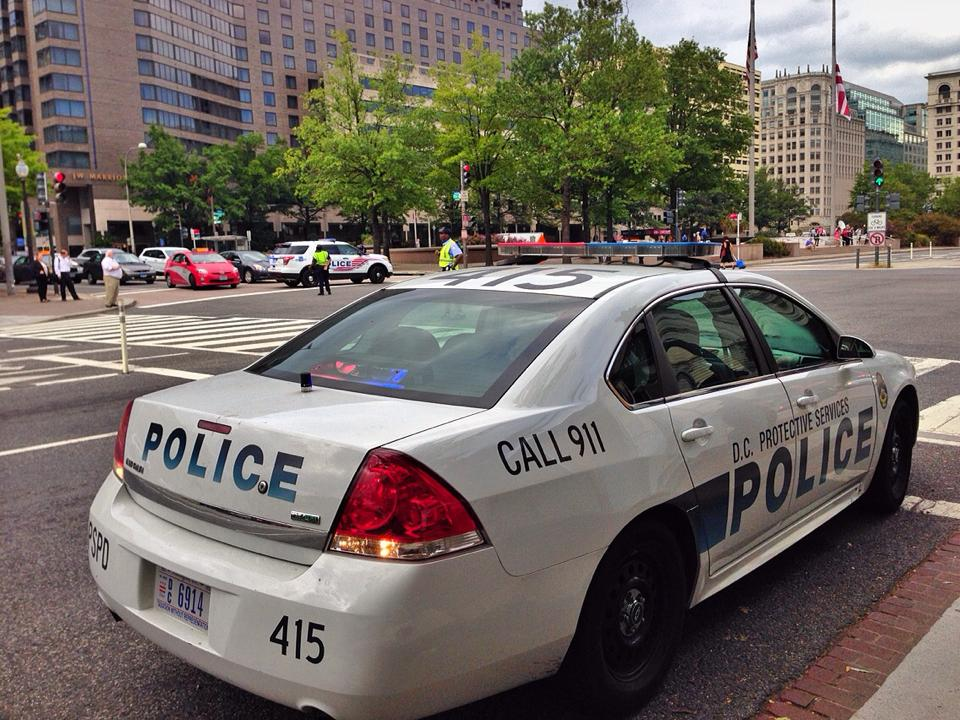
A PSD unit on a POTUS Detail, holding an intersection for the Presidential Motorcade to pass safely in Sept 2014.

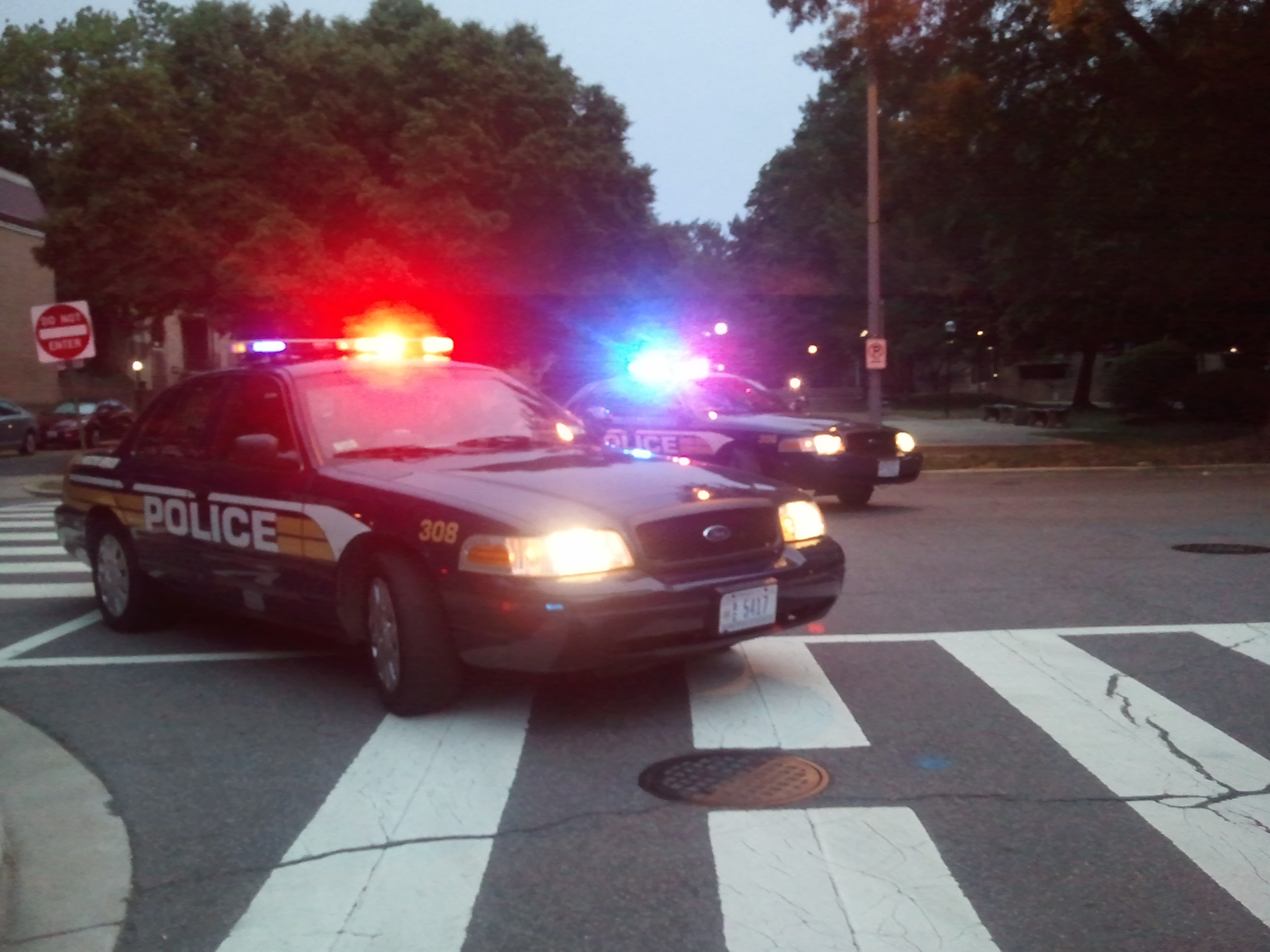
PSPD cruisers holding a perimeter in SW DC

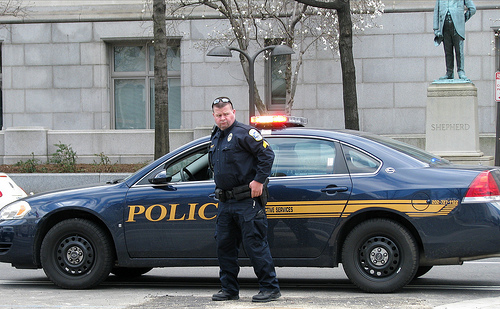
PSPD sergeant on a traffic detail

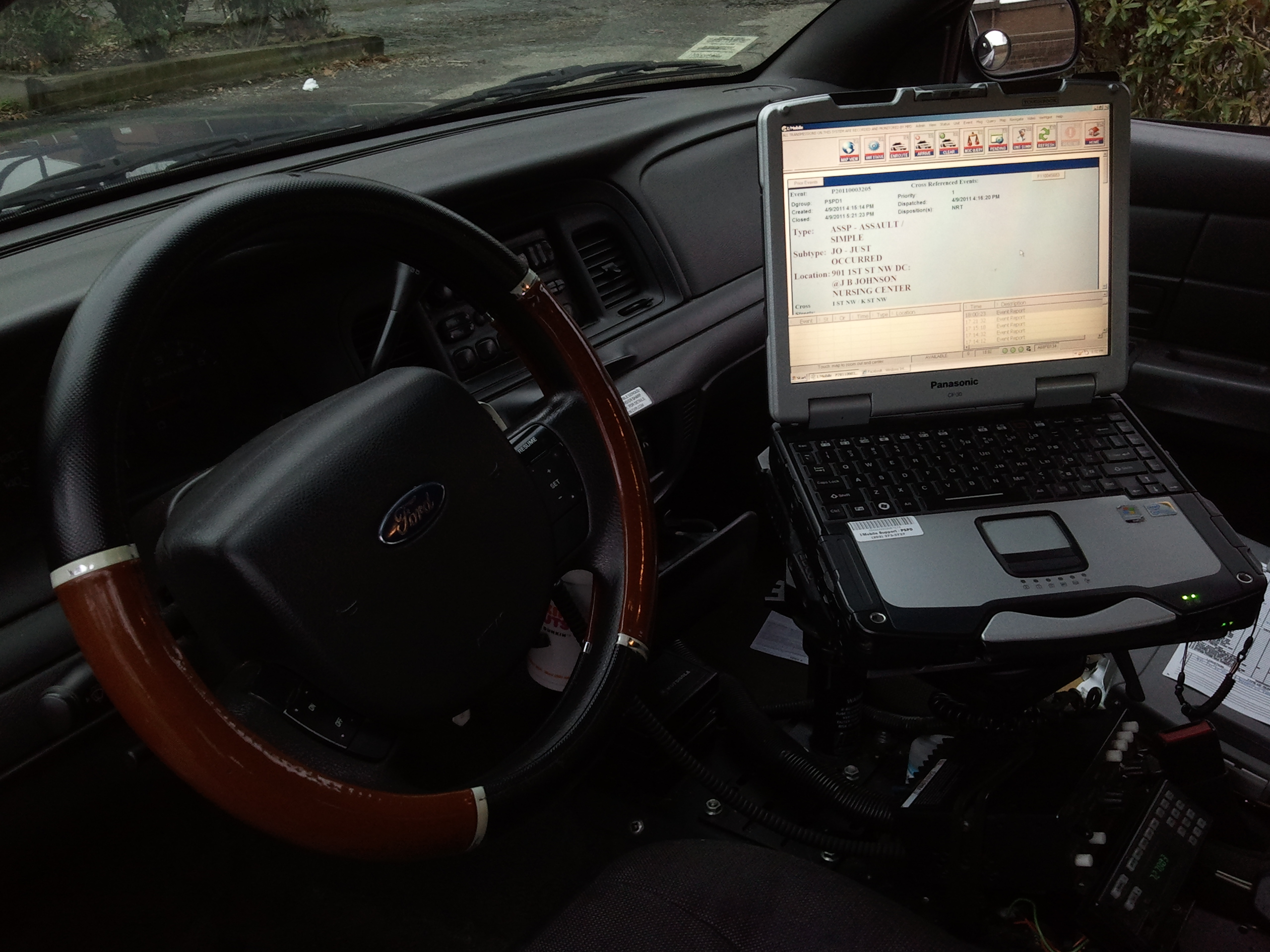
Typical setup of PSPD cruiser cockpit

PSPD personnel in roll call

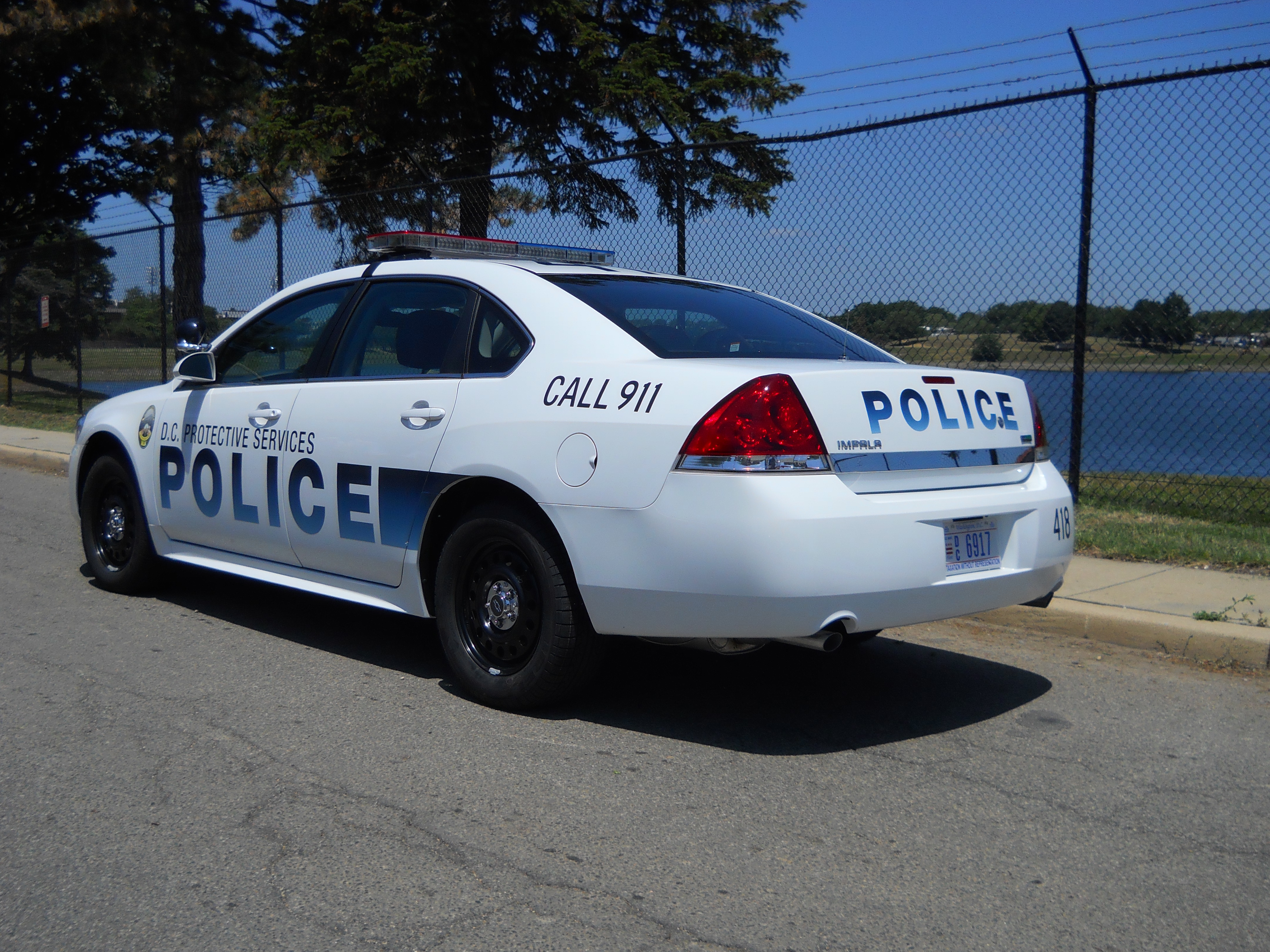
2011 PSPD Cruiser Redesign

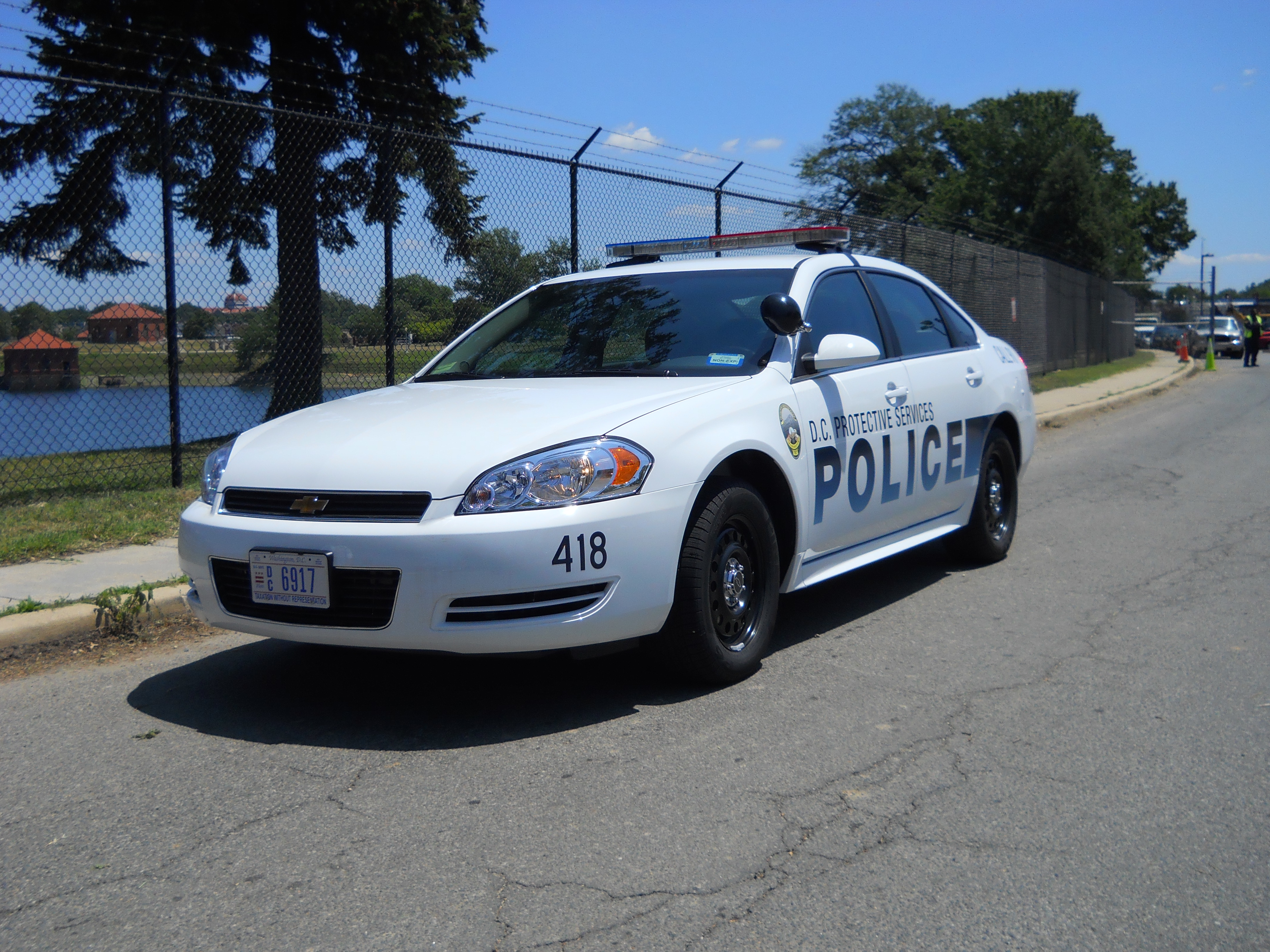
2011 PSPD Cruiser Redesign

The District of Columbia Protective Services Division (formerly, the Protective Services Police Department) is a division of the Department of General Services and serves as a Law Enforcement Division of the District of Columbia Government. The organization is responsible for "law enforcement activities and physical security of all properties owned, leased or otherwise under the control of the Government of the District of Columbia."

PSD officers are sworn law enforcement personnel with full police authority delegated from the Mayor of the District of Columbia and have the authority to bear firearms, serve warrants, and make full custodial arrests throughout the District of Columbia

== History ==
The PSD traces its beginnings to an 1899 Act of Congress, the "Watchmen in Municipal Facilities Act", which ordered the creation of a police force separate from the Metropolitan Police Department to maintain law and order in municipal government facilities that at the time were controlled by the federal government.

In 1973, the District of Columbia government established the Government Protective Services Division to control the police force being transferred from the federal government to the Mayor of the District of Columbia under the Home Rule Act. D.C. Code § 10-1005 establishes the "Protective Services Police Department, which shall coordinate and manage the security and law enforcement requirements for District government agencies and facilities."

In September 2009, Mayor Adrian Fenty signed an Executive Order that changed the name of the agency from "Protective Services Division" to "Protective Services Police Department."

In 2012, Mayor Vincent Gray transferred PSPD from the Department of Real Estate Services to the new Department of General Services. The legislation ordering the transfer was attached to the FY 2012 Budget Support Act, and transmitted to the U.S. Congress on August 11, 2012, for a 30-day review. Congress took no action, thus it became law on October 1, 2012. With this act, the Protective Services Police Department became the Protective Services Division of the Department of General Services.

== Areas of responsibility and primary jurisdiction ==
- John A. Wilson Building (Seat of Government/City Hall)
- Historic Eastern Market
- DC Government Office Buildings (Reeves Center, One Judiciary Square, Municipal Center, Southwest Towers, etc.)
- DC Department of Mental Health facilities, including St Elizabeth's Hospital and Halfway Houses throughout the city
- DC City Parks, Recreation Centers and Pools
- DC Office on Aging Facilities including 2 Nursing Homes
- DC Fire and EMS Headquarters, Fire Stations and facilities
- DC Department of Human Services Homeless Shelters
- DC Department of Human Services Welfare Offices
- DC Department of Health Community Health Care Clinics (Unity Health)
- DC Animal Shelter and associated facilities
- DC Water treatment plants and facilities
- DC Department of Public Works yards and facilities
- DC Department of Transportation yards and facilities
- DC Department of Homeland Security and Emergency Management Agency Headquarters
- DC Metropolitan Police Department Headquarters and facilities
- DC Office of Unified Communications facilities (911 centers, communications towers, etc.)
- DC Court Services and Offender Supervision Agency (Parole and Probation)
- DC Department of Motor Vehicles Service Centers
- DC Village Campus
- DC General Campus
- ST Elizabeth's Campus
- DC Sports and Entertainment Authority facilities (RFK Stadium, Nationals Stadium, etc.)
- DC Department of Employment Services One Stop Centers and facilities
- DC OCTO Data Centers
- DC Child and Family Services Agency facilities
- ALL OTHER PROPERTIES AND GROUNDS, OWNED, LEASED OR RENTED BY THE DISTRICT OF COLUMBIA GOVERNMENT.

== Operational ==
PSD officers assigned to the Mobile Operations Branch are deployed throughout the District of Columbia and are responsible for answering calls for police services in the assigned Police District. PSD utilizes the District of Columbia Office of Unified Communications for dispatching and therefore, PSD officers work off the same radio dispatch zones as their DC Metropolitan Police Department and DC Housing Authority counterparts.

PSD is tasked with providing uniformed police officers to support the operations of other District agencies when needed and is occasionally tasked with providing Executive Protection Details to District Government Officials or other dignitaries visiting the District of Columbia.

PSD officers are issued similar duty equipment as the officers of the MPDC. The standard duty weapon is the GLOCK 17, while officials at the rank of Captain and above may be issued GLOCK 19 or GLOCK 26 service weapons. Since, PSD officers are government employees with the authority to make full custodial arrests; the officers are "qualified law enforcement officers" as defined in the Law Enforcement Officers Safety Act, and can therefore carry concealed firearms while off-duty anywhere in the United States without regard to local and state laws.

== Organization ==
- Uniformed Operations Section - Uniformed police patrols covering all seven police districts, 911 response and protection of critical infrastructure, government officials and the public using DC Government Facilities, as well as uniformed police details at the Wilson Building (Seat of Government), DC Consolidated Forensics Laboratory and the DC National Guard Armory.
- Threat Management Section - Threat management, threat assessments on District Government Officials, electronic security systems, coordinating and writing emergency response plans for District agencies including the Emergency Evacuation/Relocation Plan for the District Government.
- Mission Support Section - Administrative Operations and Contract Security Guard Management

=== Leaders ===
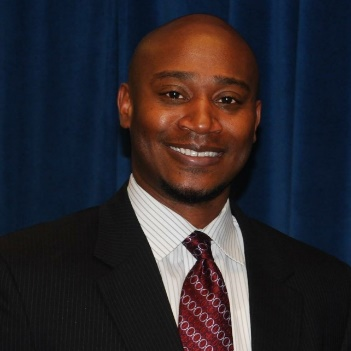
Larry "Nero" Priester, associate director for PSD, 2022–Present

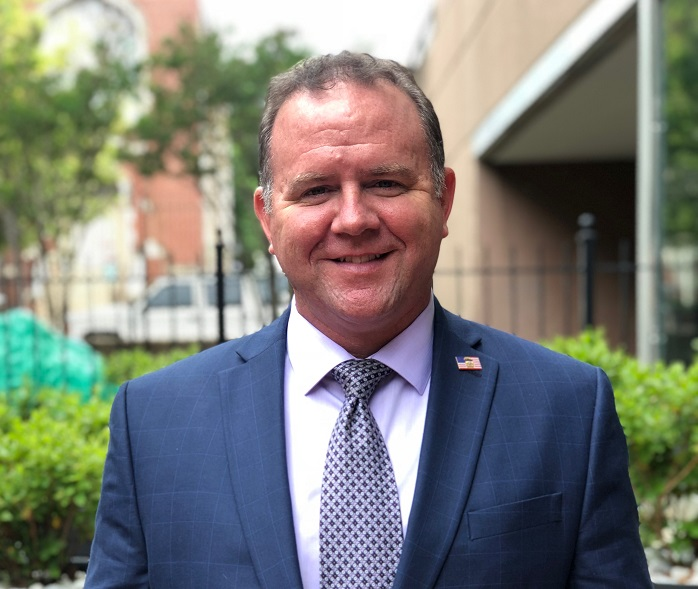
Conan Bruce, associate director for PSD, 2018–2019

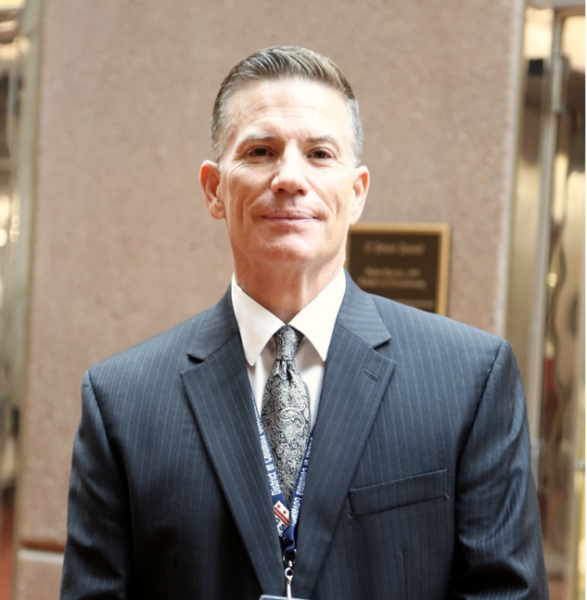
Robert Carter, Acting Associate Director for PSD, 2017-2018

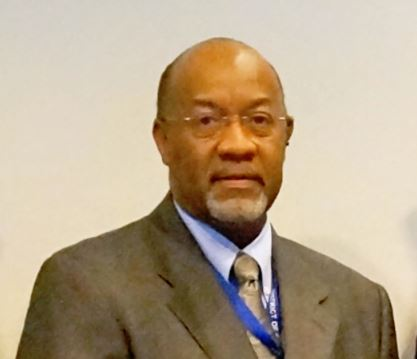
COL Anthony Fortune, associate director for PSD, 2014–2017

Plez Jenkins, associate director for PSD, 2013-2014

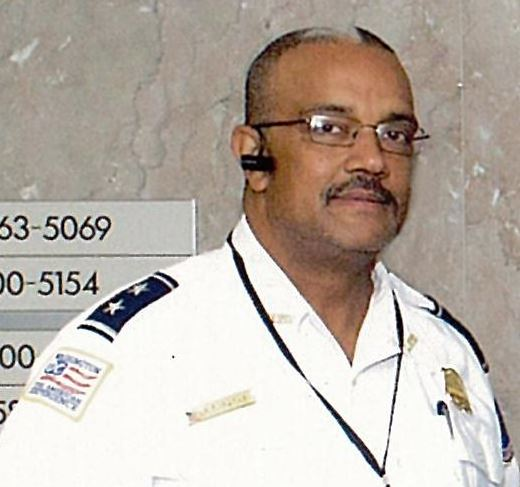
Rodney Parks, Acting Chief of PSPD (detailed from MPD), 2012–2013

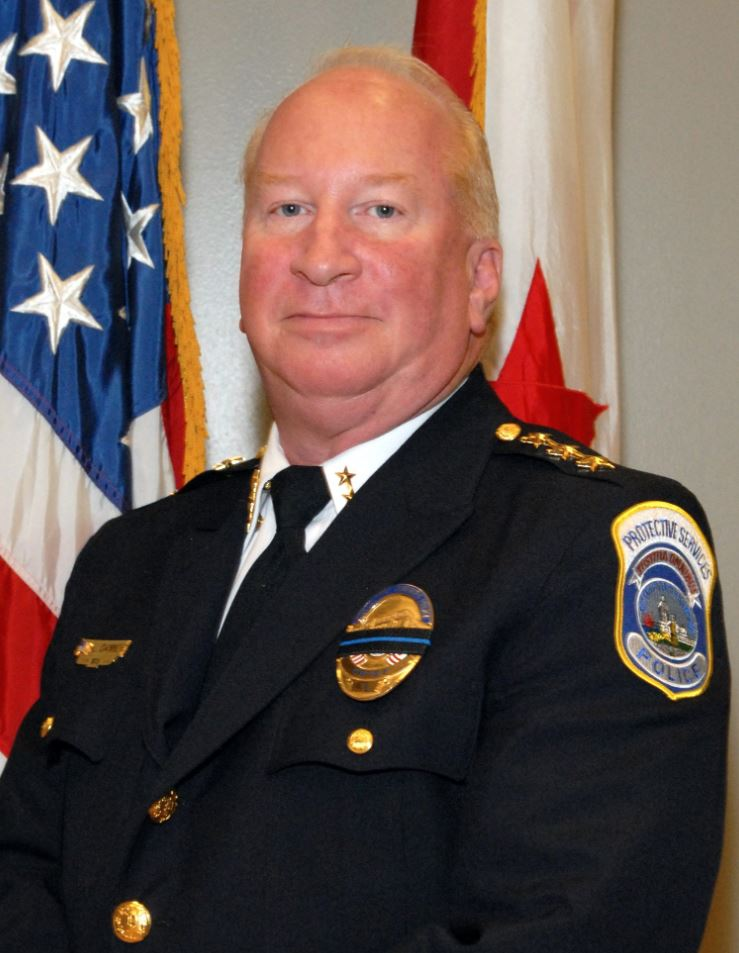
Louis Cannon, Chief of PSPD, 2009–2012

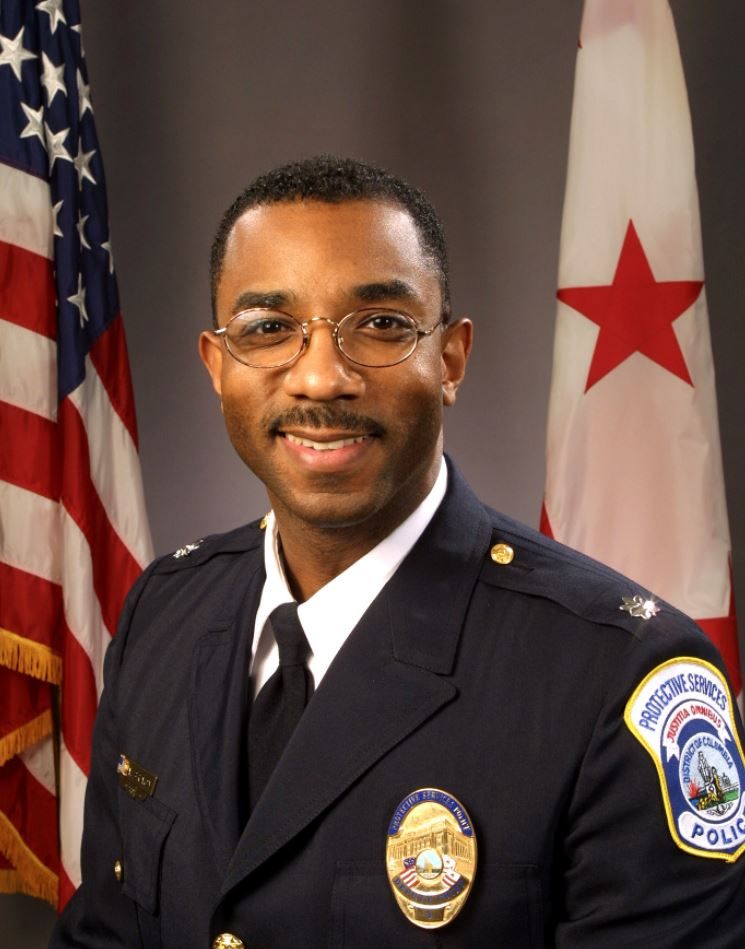
Arnold Bracy, Chief of PSPD, 2005–2008

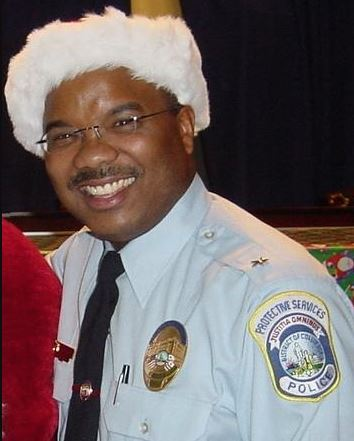
Gerald Wilson, Chief of PSPD, 2004-2005

Plez Jenkins, Chief of PSPD, 2004-2004

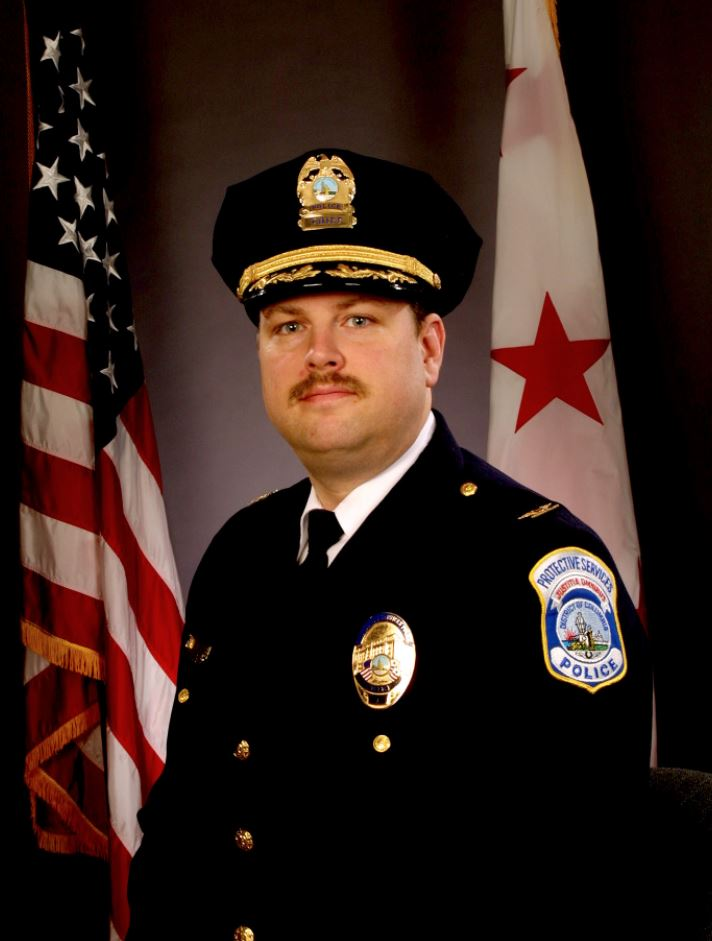
Tom Francis, Chief of PSPD, 1999-2004

=== Rank structure ===
PSD uses a rank structure that is similar to MPDC.

Title	Insignia
Associate Director of DGS for PSD	
Deputy Associate Director - Operations Bureau	
Commander	
Captain	
Lieutenant	
Sergeant	
Lead Police Officer	
Police Officer	

=== Fallen officers ===
Since 1973, one PSD/PSPD officer has died in the line of duty. Mack Wesley Cantrell died from gunshot wounds sustained during the Hanafi Siege of the District Building (now the John Wilson Building) on March 9, 1977.

== Gallery ==
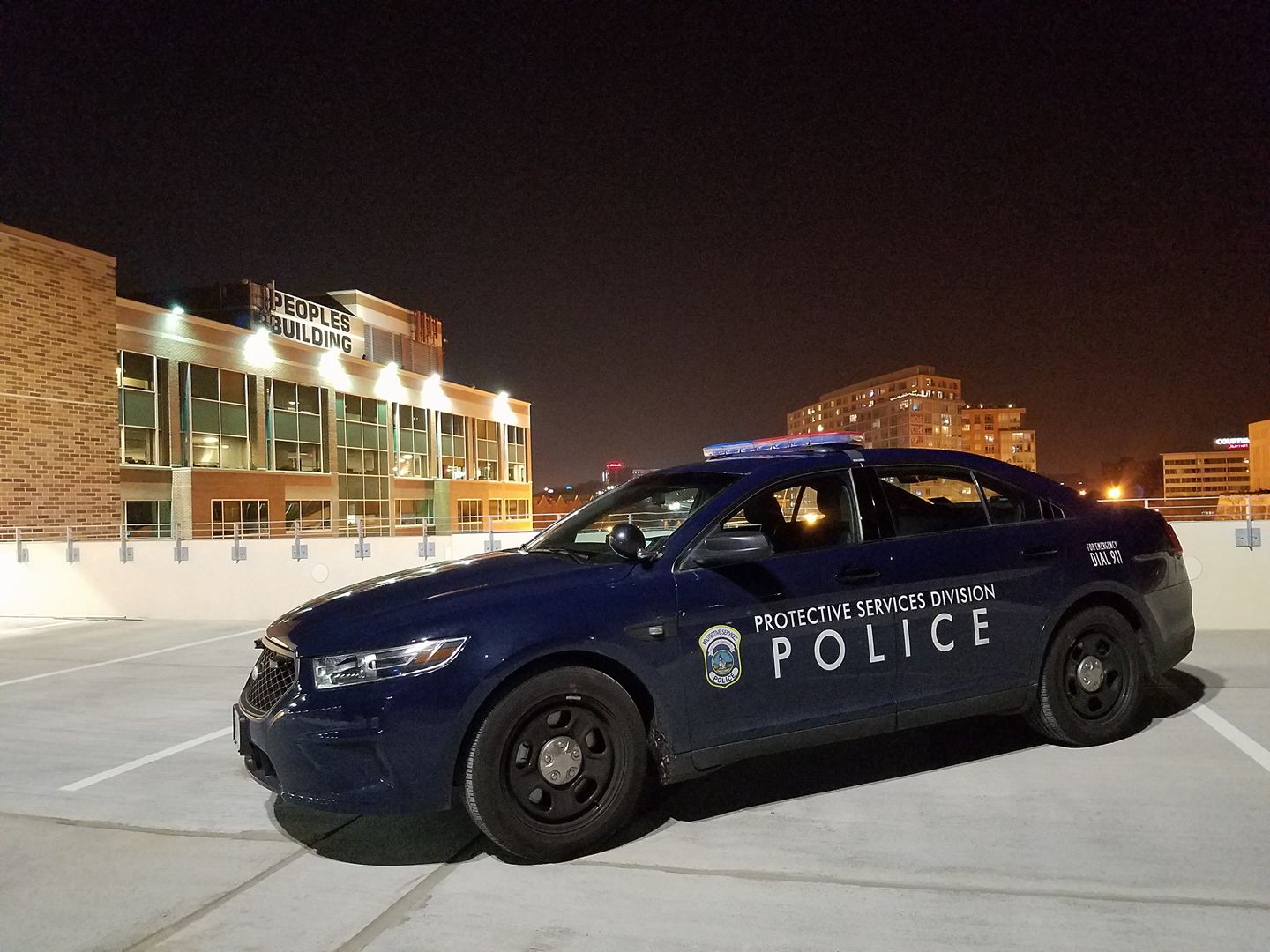
DC PSD Cruiser 2018

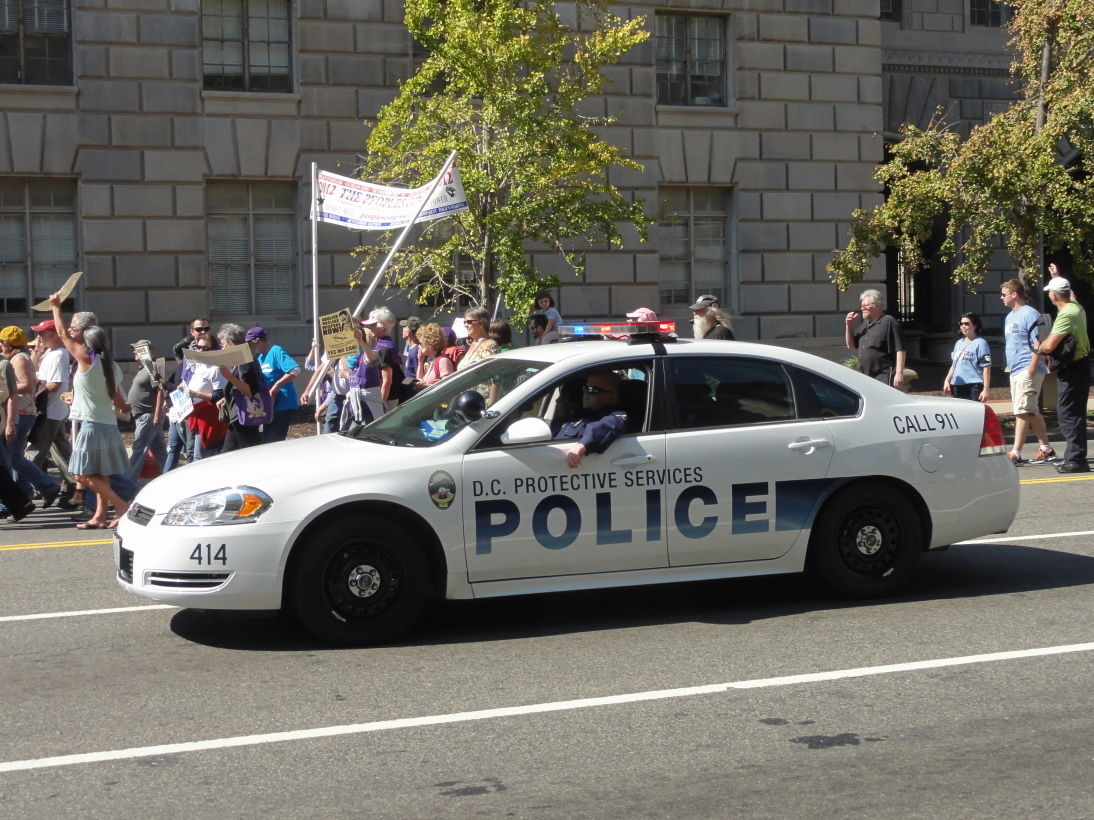
PSPD Cruiser escorting Occupy DC Protesters - 2011

PSPD Cruiser - 2011

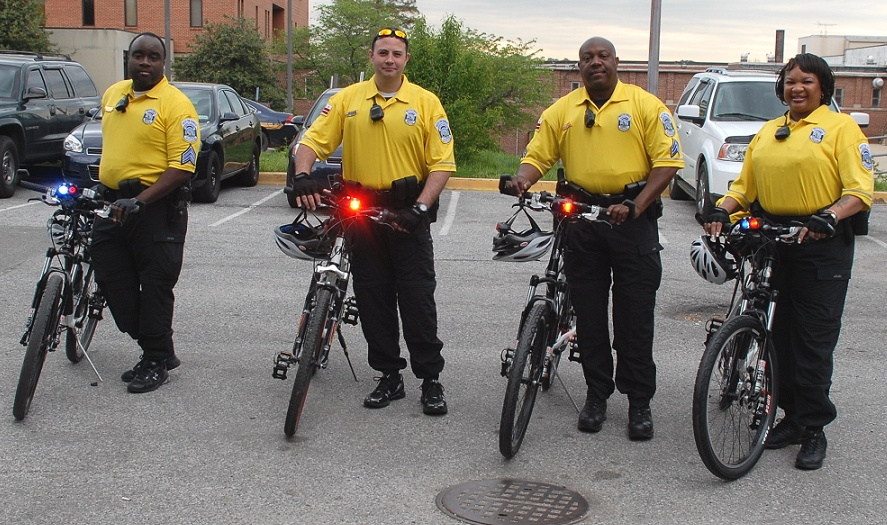
PSPD Mountain Bike Unit - 2010

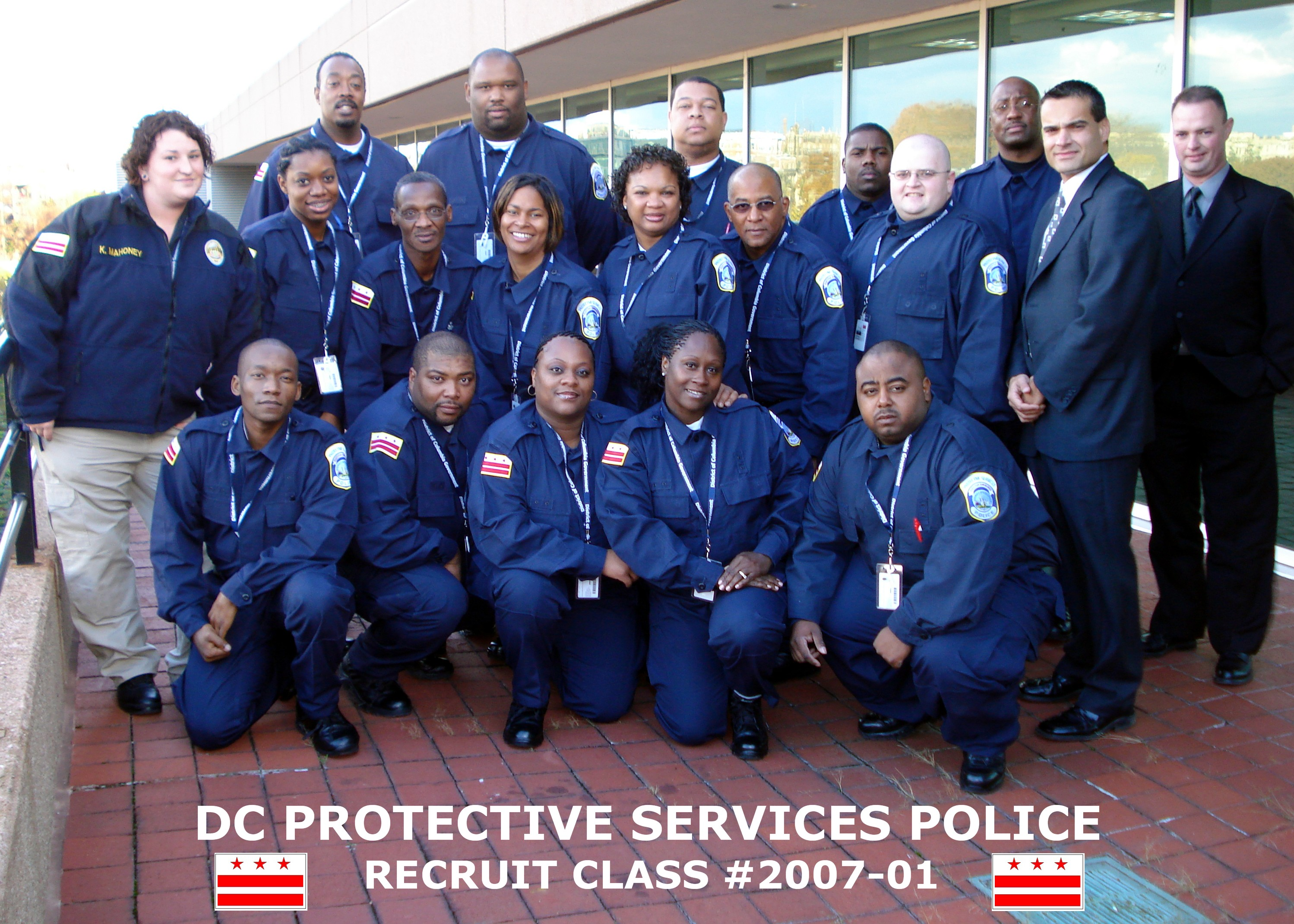
PSPD Recruit/Lateral Class 2007-01 - 2007

== See also ==
- List of law enforcement agencies in the District of Columbia
