= Campus police =

Type of police agency associated with a university

Campus police or university police in the United States and Canada are sworn police or peace officers employed by a college or university to protect the private or public property of the campus and surrounding areas and the people who live, work, and visit it. In instances where they are not technically police officers, they are often known as campus safety or campus security.

== Canada ==
Campus police in Canada are sworn in as peace officers – giving them full police powers on their respective campuses to enforce the Criminal Code, as well as local bylaws. Peace officers in Canada do not typically carry firearms like their police counterparts, so campus officers only carry a baton, pepper spray, handcuffs and a radio. Protective vests, similar to those of police, are worn. Notable examples of campus peace officer services include the University of Toronto Campus Safety Division, McMaster University Security Service, University of Alberta Protective Services and The Southern Alberta Institute of Technology.

In Ontario, the term of 'campus police' is prohibited under Bill 68 of the Community Safety and Policing Act, 2019. If anyone other than a police service, including a peace officer service, wishes to address themselves as 'police', they must seek exemption from the province.

== United States ==
In the 2004–05 school year, 87% of college campuses had sworn officers with the power to arrest, and 90% of these departments were armed.

Some secondary public school districts maintain their own police, such as the Los Angeles School Police Department, the Miami-Dade County Public Schools Police Department and the New York City Police Department School Safety Division.

=== History in the United States ===
While modern conceptions and roles of campus policing are relatively new, their introduction into US colleges and universities is not. Yale University is accredited with creating the first university police force in 1894, with the initial function of the removal and policing of homeless people from the university premises. However, the creation of the police force at Yale did not precipitate the implementation of nationwide campus police forces and the proliferation of modern campus policing was still not yet feasible. The next few decades of campus policing mainly occurred through the designation of police officers on universities to serve as watchmen. Under this model, officers served more or less as custodial figures whose responsibilities consisted of keeping a watchful eye over university property in the event of any defacements due to events such as water damage, fire, and other external threats. The 1950s and 1960s ushered in a shift from the custodial and “watchman" models of campus policing which emphasized the protection of property, and directly contributed to the shaping of campus police into more proactive and modern policing departments.

The development of the modern model for campus policing arose out of a variety of social, historical, and political factors. One of these factors included the growth of student enrollment in college campuses across the country at large, following World War II. Increases in enrollment helped to transform campuses into their own municipalities, and with this change in demographic came increased incidents of crime. University presidents soon sought to implement university police forces of their own to help control various crimes and other issues that arose due to large student populations. This was done primarily through the lobbying of several state legislatures. In addition to increases in enrollment, the antiwar, civil rights, and other protest movements of the 1960s and 1970s similarly contributed to the development and evolution of campus policing as it is known today. It was during this time that colleges and universities began to hire former members of law enforcement and the military to control student protesters. With these political and social forces at play, universities continued to model the function of their police forces after city police departments, in what is known as a vocational policing. Under this model, the university would have direct oversight over the police force, and a more militarized structure of hierarchies would be at play. Similar trajectories would occur with the implementation of police officers, known as school resource officers (SRO's) in U.S. public schools. As of 2016, 77% of schools in the U.S. with 1000 or more students reported having at least one SRO on their campus at least once a week.

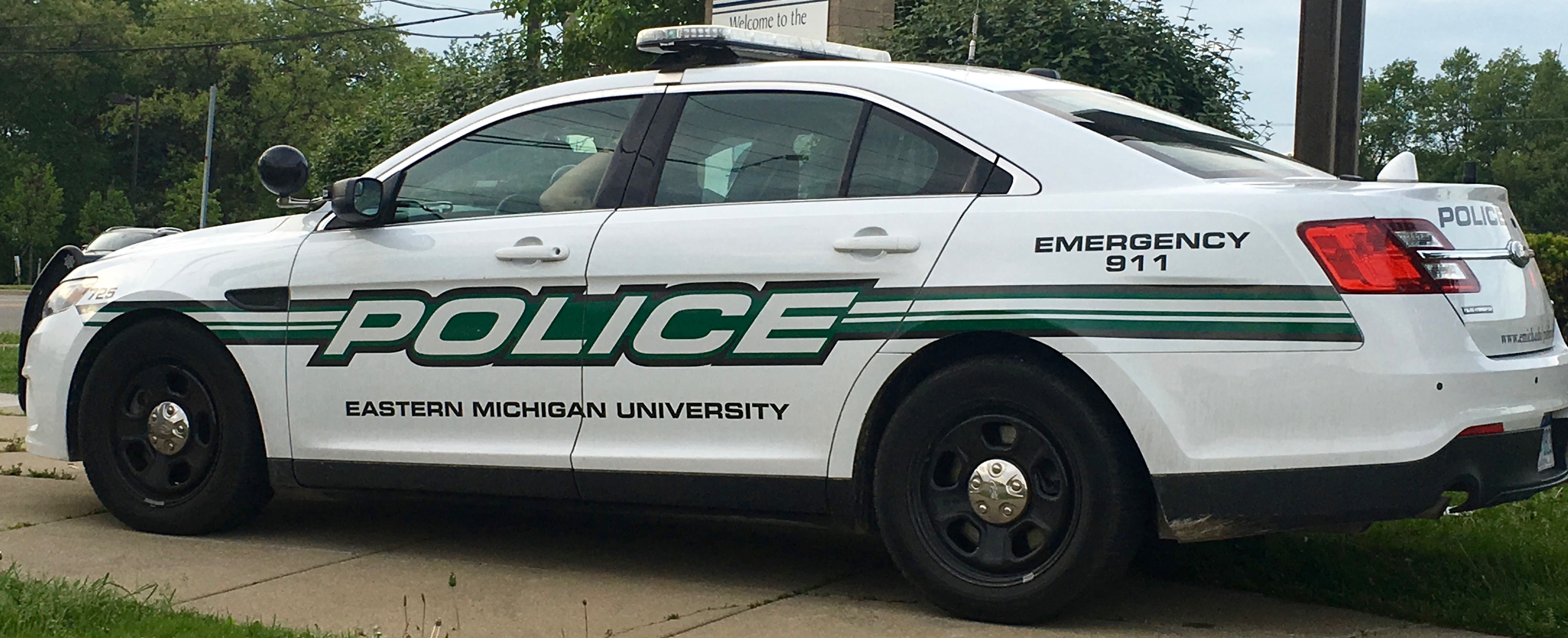
A typical U.S. campus police car, with the name of the school appearing below

With city police departments as a model, campus and public school police forces began to emerge as entities who operate on the basis mass surveillance on campuses. This was achieved through a myriad of mechanisms, including the solidifying of administrative systems, advocating for policing via community partnerships, standardized policing procedures and protocols, and more significantly, the arming of campus police. The evolution of campus police forces into seemingly more professional entities was also made evident in changes to uniform policies. This took shape through the use of uniforms that were similar in fashion to military uniforms, in addition to the incorporation of bulletproof vests. The goal of making campus police more professional, similarly included the employment and recruitment of retired law enforcement officials.

Along with protest movements, there remains additional factors that ultimately contributed to the expansion, professionalization, and militarization of campus police forces. This included various federal legislative acts in response to drug usage, post-9/11 measures, and general shifts in dealing with crime. Of significance is the implementation of the 1990 Clery Act. The Clery Act sought to further address and account for crime occurring on university campuses by requiring that colleges and universities that receive federal funding submit formal reports detailing the crimes that occur on their campuses. This ultimately led campuses to heighten policing efforts.

School shootings would also have a huge impact on the shaping of modern campus police forces, as well as the justification to arm them. The Virginia Tech shooting of 2007, in which 32 people were killed and another 17 wounded, garnered media attention at the international level and consequently brought about various changes to how policing is conducted on college campuses. In the aftermath of the massacre, various task force reports were conducted to create policy recommendations for universities, the state, and specifically for campus police, in preparation for the next Virginia Tech. These reports indicated the limited scope and resources of campus police, and in the case of Virginia Tech, campus police were tasked with enlisting the help of the Blacksburg Police Department during the shooting. A 2015 US Department of Justice special report was compiled to examine the role and data of campus police in their response to shootings such as the Virginia Tech incident, and others. The report which analyzed the 2011–2012 school year, found that the percentage of campuses using armed police officers rose 7% from the 2004–2005 school year, and roughly 94% of campus police officers were allowed to use other weapons such as pepper spray and batons. To date, there is little-to-no empirical evidence suggesting that the presence of armed police officers deters campus shootings.

Expansion and militarization of campus policing on colleges and universities has taken place alongside an increase in incidents of police violence and racial bias no different from their municipal counterparts. These issues have been made evident in the calls to action made by students, activists, and concerned community members alike in response to the murder of George Floyd by Minneapolis police officers. Black student activists at Yale university (which is accredited for creating the first campus police force in the US) have since been advocating for the abolition and defunding of the campus police, citing a 2019 incident in which Yale police officers shot an unarmed Black couple. Calls for the disbandment of campus police forces is not specific to Yale, but is ongoing nationwide. As of 2020, over 85 student unions and groups have made calls to their respective campus administrators to end their associations with university and city police departments. Calls for the disarming, defunding or abolition of campus police continued through 2021.

== United Kingdom ==
Universities in the United Kingdom do not have police forces. However, the Universities Act 1825 gives both the universities of Oxford and Cambridge the ability to appoint Police Constables. Both universities formerly maintained police forces, although Oxford disbanded the Oxford University Police in 2003, with responsibility for university policing transferred to Thames Valley Police. Cambridge formally retains the Cambridge University Constabulary, with officers still holding police powers, but in reality they only perform a security and stewarding role. The University of Northampton has a dedicated University Northamptonshire Police Team at their Waterside Campus.

== See also ==
- Commission on Accreditation for Law Enforcement Agencies
- Safety escort service
