= University Act (British Columbia) =

Canadian law regarding universities

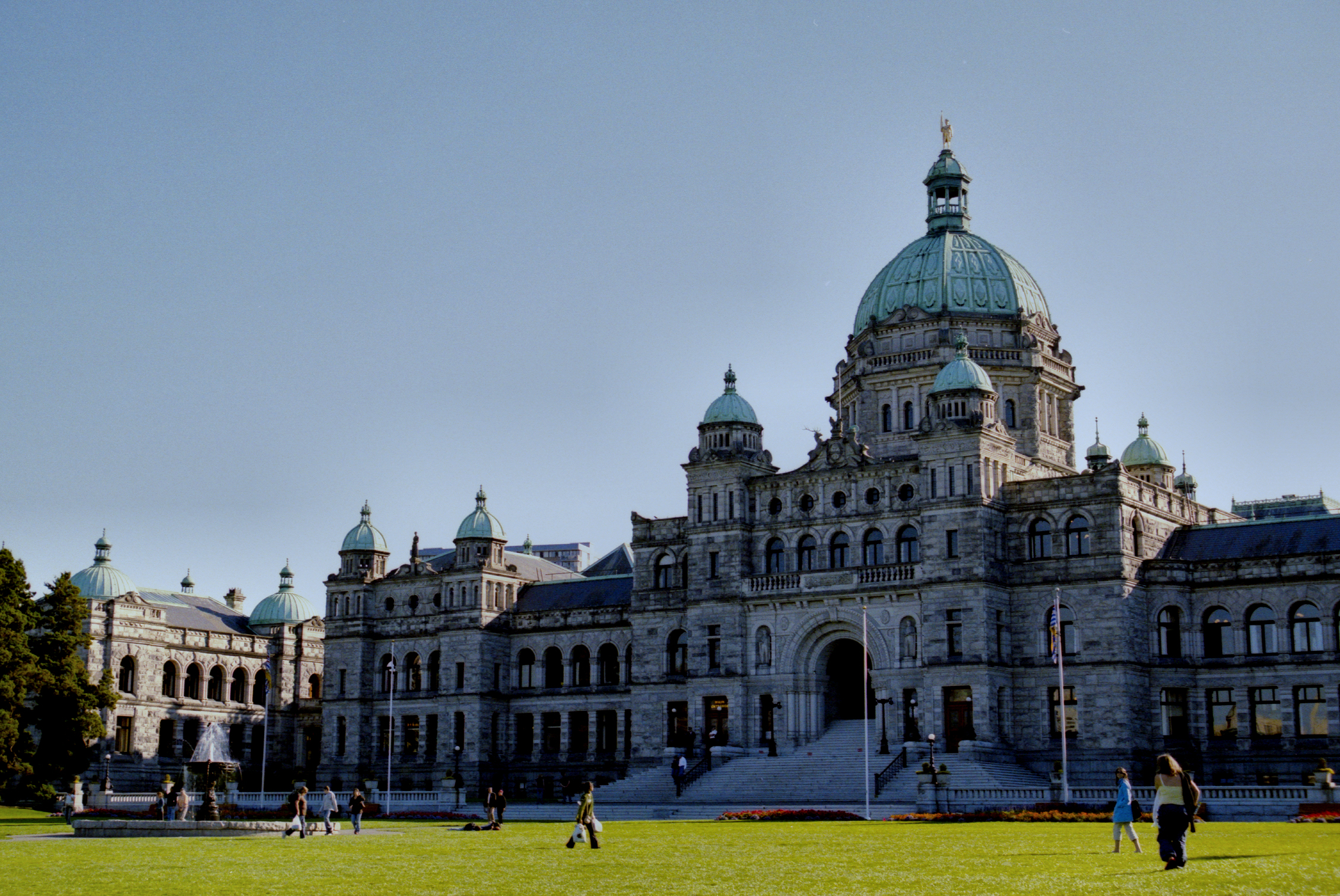

Legislative Assembly of British Columbia
- Citation: [RSBC 1996 Chapter 468]
- Territorial extent: British Columbia
- Status: In force (amended)

The University Act of British Columbia prescribes the powers, operations, and procedures of universities in British Columbia, and sets out their structures, faculties, administrations, and governing bodies.

The Act provides for the following universities:

- University of British Columbia;
- University of Victoria;
- Simon Fraser University; and
- University of Northern British Columbia.

It was enacted by the Legislative Assembly of British Columbia to establish degree-granting universities for British Columbia.

The first University Act was passed in 1890, which continues in force and defines the first Convocation of The University of British Columbia. A subsequent Act was passed in 1908 (in conjunction with the University Endowment Act of 1907). Under this new statute, the governance of the University of British Columbia was clarified.

== See also ==
- Universities Act
