= Cambridge University Constabulary =

University security service

The Cambridge University Constabulary is a body of constables that patrol the precincts of the University of Cambridge. There are approximately 20 to 30 constables in the constabulary. The university constables are commonly known as 'bulldogs'. In reality, the constabulary acts as a security and stewarding service for the university with policing the responsibility of Cambridgeshire Constabulary; the university constabulary made no arrests between 2010 and 2015 and may not have made any in the previous ten years either.

== History ==
The power of the university to attest constables was granted by the Universities Act 1825. As a non-Home Office police service, the chancellor and vice-chancellor of the university have the power to appoint constables (or in their absence any pro vice-chancellor or deputy vice-chancellor), which are in practice appointed and managed by the university's proctor's office. The Act states that these officers, once appointed, will have all the "powers and authorities, privileges, immunities, and advantages as any constables hath or shall have within his constablewick", within a four-mile (6.5 km) radius of the precincts of the university. The precincts of the university are anywhere within three miles (5 km) of Great St Mary's church together with Madingley Hall. However, it is stated on the Cambridge University website that they have jurisdiction within a five-mile (8 km) radius of Great St Mary's.

Until the 1960s, the proctors and the constabulary conducted regular street-patrols within the university precincts. Today they operate on a reactive basis when disorder or demonstrations are expected. Generally the constables restrict themselves to internal university matters with all serious crime/incidents being referred to the Cambridgeshire Constabulary, which is the territorial police force responsible for the whole of Cambridgeshire.

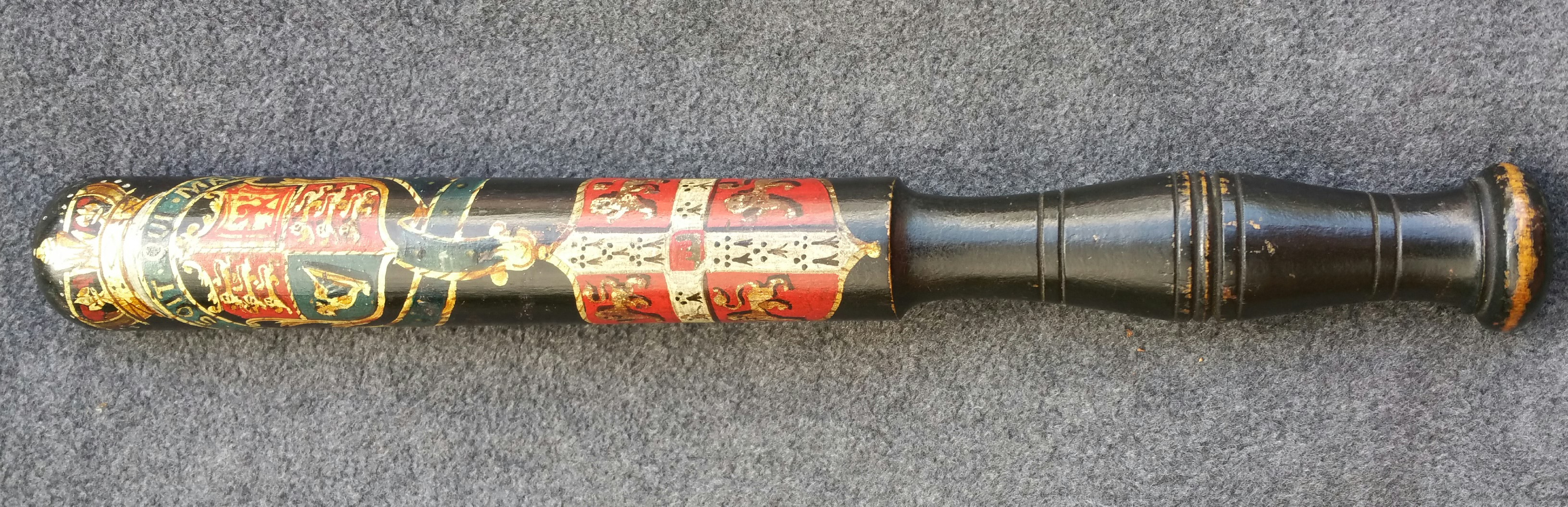
Cambridge University truncheon, 12-inch long. Likely used between 1825 and 1854. Painted crown above Queen Victoria's royal arms with the arms of the university below.

== See also ==
- Law enforcement in the United Kingdom
- List of law enforcement agencies in the United Kingdom, Crown Dependencies and British Overseas Territories
- Oxford University Police
- Campus police
