= Universities Act =

Stock short title used for legislation

Universities Act (with its variations) is a stock short title used in Canada, Ireland, Malaysia, New Zealand and the United Kingdom for legislation relating to universities.

== List ==
=== Canada ===
British Columbia

- University Act

=== Ireland ===
- Irish Universities Act 1908 (8 Edw. 7. c. 38)
- Universities Act, 1997

=== Malaysia ===
- The Universities and University Colleges Act 1971

=== New Zealand ===
- The University Endowment Act 1868 (32 Vict No 65)
- The University Degrees Act 1904 (4 Edw 7 No 38)
- The Universities Act 1961 (No 54)
- The University Grants Committee Act 1960 (No 26)
- The Universities Amendment Act 1962 (No 109)
- The Universities Amendment Act 1966 (No 7)
- The Universities Amendment Act 1970 (No 148)
- The Universities Amendment Act 1971 (No 137)
- The Universities Amendment Act 1977 (No 35)
- The Universities Amendment Act 1978 (No 130)
- The Universities Amendment Act 1980 (No 149)
- The Universities Amendment Act 1988 (No 32)

=== United Kingdom ===
- The Universities (Wine Licences) Act 1743 (16 Geo. 2. c. 40)
- The Irish Universities Act 1908 (8 Edw. 7. c. 38)
- The Universities Act 1825 (6 Geo. 4. c. 97)
- The Universities Tests Act 1871 (34 & 35 Vict. c. 26)
- The Universities and Colleges (Trusts) Act 1943 (6 & 7 Geo. 6. c. 9)
- The New Universities (Acquisition of Land) Act (Northern Ireland) 1966 (c. 4 (N.I.))

The Universities (Scotland) Acts 1858 to 1922 is the collective title of the following Acts:

- The Universities (Scotland) Act 1858 (21 & 22 Vict. c. 83)
- The Universities (Scotland) Act 1889 (52 & 53 Vict. c. 55)
- The Universities (Scotland) Act 1922 (12 & 13 Geo. 5. c. 31)

Section 8(3) of the Universities and College Estates Act 1898 (61 & 62 Vict. c. 55) provided that that act could be cited with the Universities and College Estates Act 1858 to 1880.

The Universities (Scotland) Acts 1858 to 1932 is the collective title of the Universities (Scotland) Acts 1858 to 1922 and the Universities (Scotland) Act 1932 (22 & 23 Geo. 5. c. 26).

The Universities (Scotland) Acts 1858 to 1966 is the collective title of the Universities (Scotland) Acts 1858 to 1932 and the Universities (Scotland) Act 1966 (c. 13).

The Universities and College Estates Acts 1858 to 1880 was the collective title of the following acts:

- The Universities and College Estates Act 1858 (21 & 22 Vict. c. 44)
- The Universities and College Estates Act Extension Act 1860 (23 & 24 Vict. c. 59)
- The Universities and College Estates Amendment Act 1880 (43 & 44 Vict. c. 46)

The Universities and College Estates Acts 1925 and 1964 is the collective title of the Universities and College Estates Act 1925 (15 & 16 Geo. 5. c. 24) and the Universities and College Estates Act 1964 (c. 51).

== See also ==
- List of short titles
