= Oxford University Police =

Former private police force

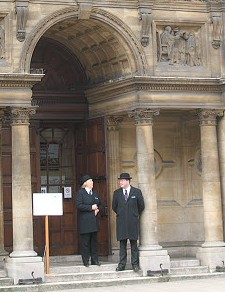
Two "Proctors Officers" outside the Examination Schools in 2009

The Oxford University Police, or Oxford University Constables (popularly known as Bulldogs or Bullers), was the private police force of the University of Oxford between 1829 and 2003. They carried warrant cards and were empowered to act as police officers within the university precincts and within areas of Oxford within four miles of any university building. As of 2001, the force existed as a private constabulary (a non-Home Office police force) with 40 sworn constables. They were widely recognised for the bowler hats which formed part of their uniform, and formerly had the duty of patrolling outside the Examination Schools alongside the university proctors, the officials responsible for discipline in the university. They were abolished by the University Council in 2003.

== History ==
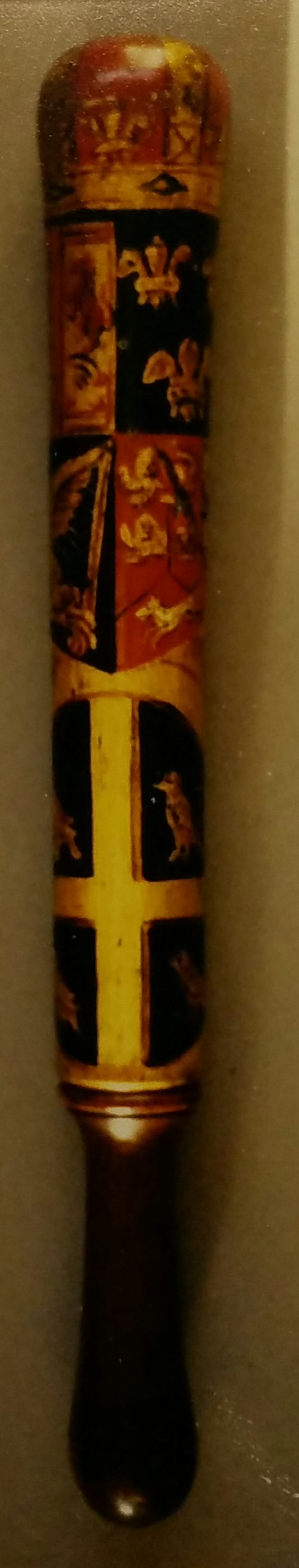
Oxford University Truncheon (1717–1801)

The power of the university to attest constables was granted by the Universities Act 1825. In 1829, the same year that the Metropolitan Police Service was established by then-Home Secretary Sir Robert Peel, the Vice-Chancellor of Oxford University signed the "Plan for the Establishment of an Efficient University Police", formalising the powers and duties of the university constables. They were supervised by the university proctors, and had disciplinary powers over students.

Until the end of the Second World War, the constables were considered to be in loco parentis with regard to students of the university, giving them broad disciplinary powers to enforce university rules and regulations.

In 2002, a group of local traders in Oxford wrote to Evan Harris, a local Member of Parliament, requesting the removal of the police powers of the constables over citizens who were not members of the university. They argued that the constables were "not accountable to any public authority" and described their role as an "anachronism".

After a policy review by the University Council in 2003, the University Police was disbanded when it was decided that it would be too expensive to bring the force up to the required standard of training and implement a multi-tiered complaints procedure.

The circa 40 members of the force were re-designated "Proctors' Officers". In recognition of the force's "extraordinary role over almost 180 years" (according to the senior proctor), the constables were not merged with the university's Department of Security Services, but remained under the control of the proctors. According to the Chancellor's 2003 annual report, these members can still carry out 95% of the duties without constabulary powers.

Thames Valley Police are the territorial police force responsible for providing policing to Oxford, including the university.

== See also ==
- Law enforcement in the United Kingdom
- Cambridge University Constabulary
- List of former police forces in the United Kingdom
- Campus police
