= List of law enforcement agencies in the District of Columbia =

District of Columbia flag

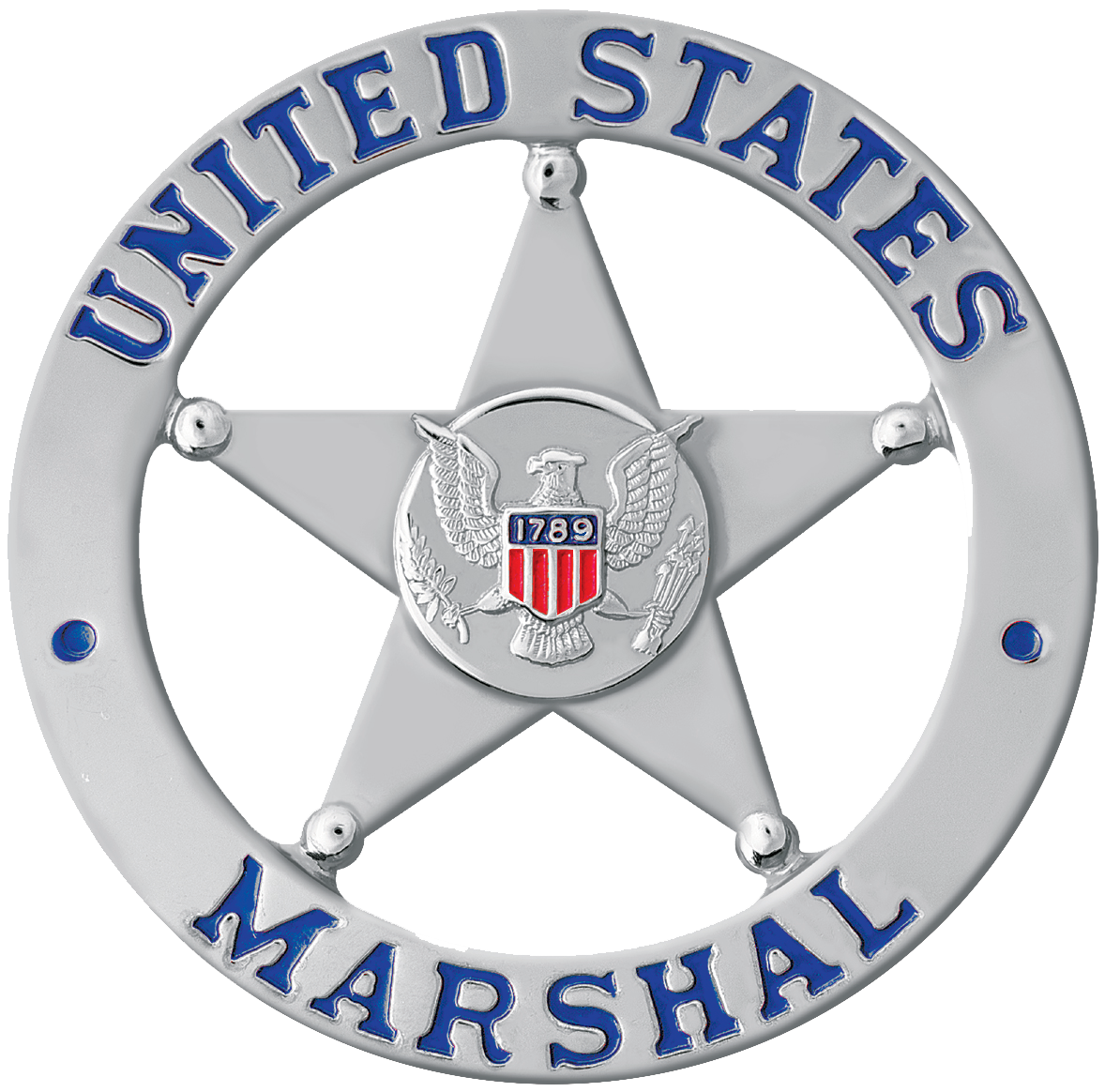
Badge of a Deputy U.S. Marshal

This is a list of law enforcement agencies in the District of Columbia.

According to the US Bureau of Justice Statistics' 2008 Census of State and Local Law Enforcement Agencies, the District has six local law enforcement agencies employing 4,262 sworn police officers, about 722 for each 100,000 residents. This is the highest proportion of police officers to citizens of any state or territory.

== Listed by age ==
The oldest agencies are the:

- United States Marshals Service, founded September 24, 1789
- United States Park Police, founded in 1791 as park watchmen to guard federal property in DC
- United States Mint Police, founded in 1792
- United States Capitol Police, founded in 1828
- Metropolitan Police Department of the District of Columbia, founded in 1861 (took the place of DC City Watch, founded in 1802)
- United States Secret Service, founded July 5, 1865
- District of Columbia Protective Services Division, founded by Congress in 1899 under the Watchmen in Municipal Facilities Act

== Primary DC law enforcement (local and federal) ==
Patch of the D.C. Metropolitan Police Department

- District of Columbia Department of Corrections
- District of Columbia Housing Authority Police Department of Public Safety (Has city-wide jurisdiction throughout Metropolitan area)
- District of Columbia Metropolitan Police Department (local municipal police covering all of DC with approximately 3,800 officers)
- District of Columbia Protective Services Division
- District of Columbia Public Schools Police - Law Enforcement Division (has city-wide jurisdiction on 119 DCPS owned and leased properties)
- District of Columbia Public Library Police
- Metro Transit Police Department (has jurisdiction in Metro rail and near Metro bus stops in DC, VA, and MD; 526 officers)
- Metropolitan Washington Airports Authority Police (jurisdiction actually falls within specific locations in VA [Reagan National and Dulles airports]; formerly FAA Police)
- United States Marshals (deputies at the Superior Court of the District of Columbia fulfill duties similar to those of a sheriff in local court matters, while deputies at the United States District Court for the District of Columbia perform more traditional and federal district court duties)
- United States Park Police (national parks federal police for the National Mall, monuments, parkways, and all national park service properties in D.C and surrounding regions; several hundred officers; shares jurisdiction with D.C. Metropolitan Police in addition to exercising federal authority)
- Washington National Cathedral Police (officers licensed by the MPD as special police officers)
- Humane Law Enforcement Department of the Humane Rescue Alliance (charted by Congress in 1870 to enforce the Districts anti-cruelty laws, formerly known as the Washington Humane Society Law Enforcement)

== Federal police agencies with a uniformed presence in District of Columbia area ==
The majority of federal law enforcement agencies have some type of jurisdiction and/or headquarter offices in the District of Columbia; however, some are more overt than others.

- Amtrak Police Department (quasi-federal, as Amtrak is government-owned)
- Armed Forces Retirement Home Police (located in northwest District of Columbia; an independent, executive-level federal agency with a force of fewer than a dozen police officers and investigators; formerly known as the United States Sailor's and Airman's Home and the Soldier's Home; established in 1834)
- Bureau of Engraving and Printing Police
- Central Intelligence Agency Security Protective Service (Provides law enforcement and security services to CIA facilities in and around the District)
- District of Columbia National Guard Military Police/Security Forces, if any (unique in that the DC Guard always answers to the President rather than to a governor)
- Federal Bureau of Investigation Police (the FBI Police are the uniformed officers responsible for the protection of FBI facilities and employees)
- Federal Bureau of Prisons (United States Department of Justice)
- Federal Protective Service (tasked with protection of federal facilities not otherwise protected by other agencies)
- Government Publishing Office Police (formerly Government Printing Office Police)
- Military Police (active and reserve of the various United States Armed Forces): Military Police Corps (United States Army); Master-at-arms (United States Navy); United States Air Force Security Forces; USMC Military Police; and the United States Coast Guard and United States Coast Guard Police
- Naval District of Washington Police (Responsible for the Washington Navy Yard, Joint Base Anacostia Bolling, Naval Research Lab, et al.)
- Smithsonian Police and National Zoo Police (Smithsonian museums federal special police who maintain concurrent jurisdiction with the U.S. Park Police)
- Supreme Court Police (Supreme Court Federal Police; under a hundred officers)
- United States Capitol Police (Congressional Federal Police; many hundreds of officers)
- United States Customs and Border Protection (CBP Officers enforce customs laws at Reagan National and Dulles International Airport, and at the Port of Washington)
- United States Department of Veterans Affairs Police (VA Police, responsible for the District of Columbia, VA Medical Center)
- U.S. Federal Reserve Police (the law enforcement arm of the Federal Reserve System, the central banking system of the US)
- United States Mint Police (the law enforcement and protective service of the United States Mint, assigned to the US Mint Headquarters Facility)
- National Gallery of Art Office of Protective Services (National Gallery of Art federal police and special police who maintain concurrent jurisdiction with U.S. Park Police)
- United States Park Police
- United States Pentagon Police (Pentagon Police also have jurisdiction at Department of Defense-leased property throughout the National Capital Region, and at the US Military Court of Appeals in District of Columbia)
- United States Postal Police (uniformed division of United States Postal Inspection Service)
- United States Secret Service Uniformed Division (Uniformed Division was formerly known as the White House Police Force)

=== Agencies operating under the second Trump administration's D.C. Task Force ===
Under Trump's 2025 Executive Orders 14252 "Making the District of Columbia Safe and Beautiful" and 14333 "Declaring a Crime Emergency in the District of Columbia", multiple federal agencies that do not normally provide policing in the District of Columbia were deployed to patrol the streets and supplement local law enforcement agencies. Over 20 federal agencies and units participate or have participated in the D.C. Safe and Beautiful Task Force established by the administration. This task force is chaired by the Assistant to the President and Homeland Security Advisor, currently Stephen Miller. The following is a list of agencies that were reported or sighted in the DC since the federal intervention began who have expanded their operations in the area or started operating in the area under the 2025 executive orders.

- National Guard troops from various states operating under Joint Task Force DC
  - Alabama
  - Arkansas
  - District of Columbia
  - Florida
  - Georgia
  - Indiana
  - Louisiana
  - Mississippi
  - Ohio
  - Oklahoma
  - South Carolina
  - West Virginia
- Bureau of Alcohol, Tobacco, Firearms and Explosives (ATF)
- Drug Enforcement Administration (DEA)
- Federal Bureau of Investigation (FBI)
- Department of Homeland Security (DHS)
  - Customs and Border Patrol (CBP)
  - Federal Protective Service (FPS)
  - Immigration and Customs Enforcement (ICE)
    - Homeland Security Investigations (HSI)
    - Enforcement and Removal Operations (ERO)
- Internal Revenue Service, Criminal Investigation (IRS-CI)
- U.S. Marshals Service (USMS)
- U.S. Park Police (USPP)
- U.S. Secret Service (USSS)

== College and university agencies ==
- American University Police Department
- Catholic University Department of Public Safety
- George Washington University Police (GWPD)
- Gallaudet University Department of Public Safety
- Georgetown University Police Department
- Howard University Campus Police
- University of the District of Columbia Police Department
- Trinity University Department of Public Safety

== See also ==
- Crime in Washington, D.C.
- Law enforcement in the United States
- List of United States federal law enforcement agencies
- List of United States state and local law enforcement agencies
