= Safety escort service =

A safety escort service, security escort service, or simply escort service is a service provided on and around many college and university campuses to help ensure the safety of students and staff. The escort may be provided by campus police staff or student volunteers and may be provided on foot or by vehicle. The IACLEA Accreditation Commission adopted new standards on July 1, 2008 that require all student and civilian volunteers that participate in safety escort services to undergo appropriate documented background checks and participate in a training program.

== See also ==
- Campus police
- Law enforcement escort
