= Universities Act 1825 =

Act of the Parliament of the United Kingdom

Universities Act 1825 (Note: The citation of this act by this short title was authorised by section 1 of, and the first schedule to, the Short Titles Act 1896. Due to the repeal of those provisions it is now authorised by section 19(2) of the Interpretation Act 1978.)
- Act of Parliament
- Parliament of the United Kingdom
- Long title: An Act for the better Preservation of the Peace and good Order in the Universities of England.
- Citation: 6 Geo. 4. c. 97
- Territorial extent: United Kingdom

Dates
- Royal assent: 5 July 1825
- Commencement: 5 July 1825 (Note: The Acts of Parliament (Commencement) Act 1793.)

Other legislation
- Amended by: Statute Law Revision (No. 2) Act 1888; Statute (Law) Repeals Act 1969; Statute Law (Repeals) Act 1989

Status: Partially repealed

Text of statute as originally enacted

Revised text of statute as amended

Text of the Universities Act 1825 as in force today (including any amendments) within the United Kingdom, from legislation.gov.uk.

The Universities Act 1825 (6 Geo. 4. c. 97, long title An Act for the better Preservation of the Peace and good Order in the Universities of England) is an act of the Parliament of the United Kingdom which provides for officers of police constable status within Cambridge and Oxford universities. Sections 3 and 4 have been repealed. In 2003, the University of Oxford closed its police force to avoid the complexity and costs of complying with new standards.

== Provisions ==
=== Section 1 ===
Section 1 of the act provided for the appointment for abled personnel such as police constables deemed fit by the chancellor or vice-chancellor of the universities of Cambridge and Oxford. Jurisdiction was within the precincts and four miles outside of the relevant universities.

=== Section 2 ===
Section 2 of the act provides for a pro vice chancellor, or deputy vice chancellor to create constables in the absence of the chancellor.

=== Section 3 ===
Section 3 of the act provided for the apprehension of prostitutes within the precincts of the university.

=== Section 4 ===
Section 4 of the act defined the act as a Public Act.

== Subsequent developments ==
Section 4 of the act was repealed by section 1 of, and the schedule to, the Statute Law Revision (No. 2) Act 1888 (51 & 52 Vict. c. 3), which came into force on 24 December 1888.

In section 3, the words " and night walker " were repealed by section 1 of, and part VII of the schedule to, the Statute Law (Repeals) Act 1969, which came into force on 1 January 1970.

Section 3 of the act repealed by section 1(1) of, and group 4 of part I of schedule 1 to, the Statute Law (Repeals) Act 1989, which came into force on 16 November 1989.

== See also ==
- Cambridge University Constabulary
- Oxford University Police
- Universities Act - list of acts
