= Security police =

Law enforcement agencies responsible for protecting specific properties

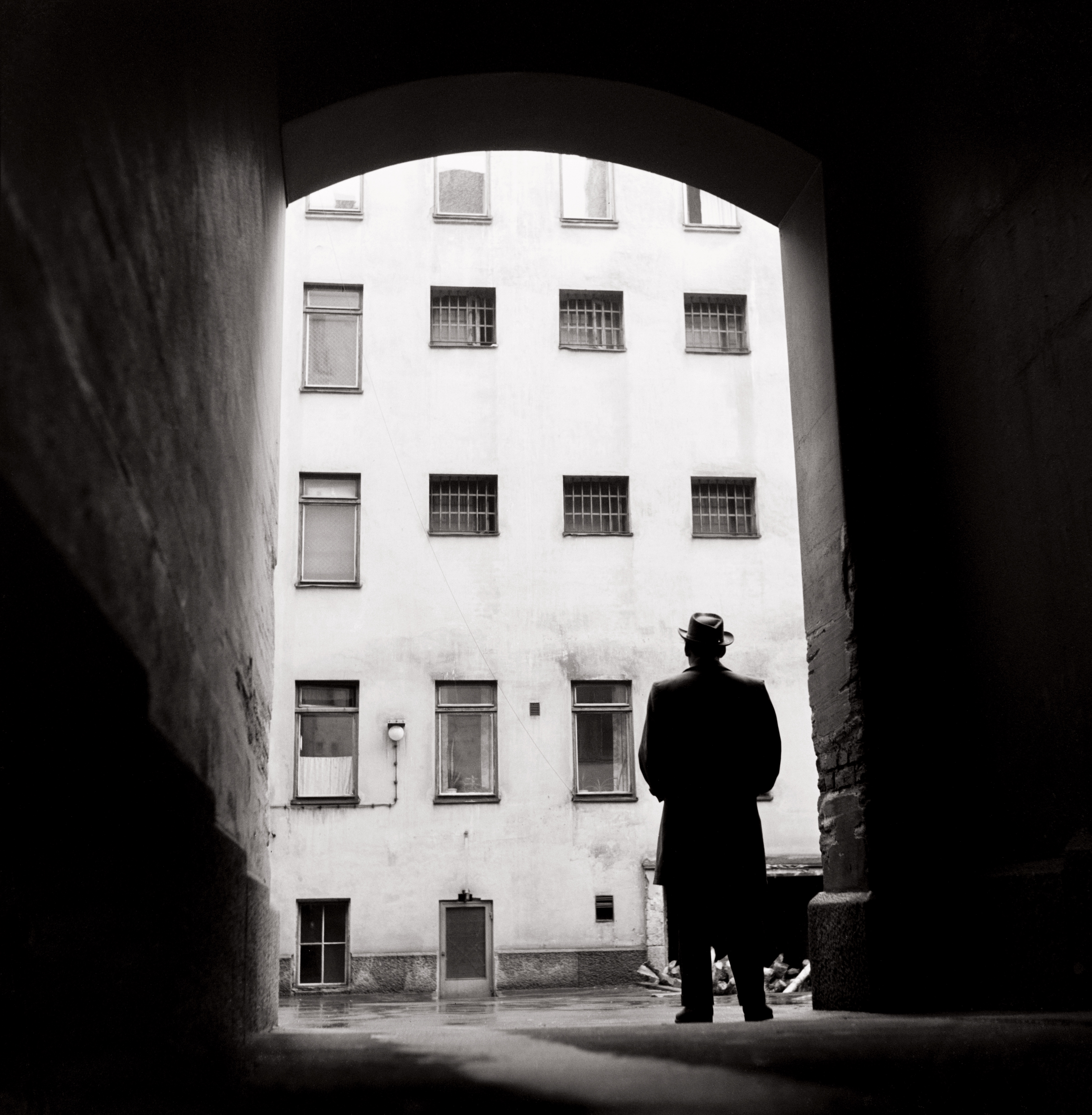
A view from the gate corridor to the courtyard of the Finnish Security Police (SUPO) in 1957

Security police usually describes a law enforcement agency which focuses primarily on providing security and law enforcement services to particular areas or specific properties. They may be employed by governmental, public, or private institutions. Security police are generally considered distinct from security guards as security police personnel typically hold some level of law enforcement authority. The exact powers held by security police vary widely between jurisdictions. Examples of these types of agencies include the United States' DoD Police and FBI Police, the Indian Central Industrial Security Force, and the British Civil Nuclear Constabulary.

In some countries, security police is the name given to the secret security and intelligence services charged with protecting the state at the highest level, including responsibilities such as personal protection of the head of state, counterintelligence, and counter-terrorism. Examples of these agencies include the Japanese Security Police and the Georgian Security Police Department.

== Types of security police agencies ==
Types of security police may include:

- Airport police, who provide law enforcement and security services to airports
- Campus police and school police, who provide law enforcement and security services to specific public and private schools, colleges, universities, and other educational institutions
- Housing authority police, who primarily protect publicly-owned housing or housing projects
- Hospital police, who provide law enforcement and security services to specific medical institutions and their facilities and properties
- Park police and park rangers, who primarily protect parks facilities and their grounds
- Capitol police, who protect state properties such as legislative, executive buildings, state/national capitol buildings, and their grounds, and can also include executive protection functions
- Company police and private police, who provide law enforcement and security services on company or private property (working either directly for the company/private entity or for a third-party entity which provides law enforcement services by contract), where local law permits private organizations to establish their own law enforcement agencies

Generally, any law enforcement agency dedicated to the security of a particular property or properties may be considered a security police agency.

== Security police powers and authority ==
Security police differ from security guards in that personnel of security police agencies are considered law enforcement officers, while security guards generally are not. Even where security guards hold some form of policing powers beyond that of the average individual they are not generally considered "security police." The powers and authority of security police vary by jurisdiction, but at a minimum they generally hold detainment and arrest powers.

Some security police agencies enjoy enhanced authority in certain circumstances. For example, the Belfast Harbour Police of Northern Ireland may, in addition to having authority to enforce the law of Northern Ireland and of the United Kingdom, enforce the Belfast Harbour Commissioners’ by-laws.

Security police are generally trained to a similar — if not identical — standard as other law enforcement officers of their nation, though standards do vary widely between jurisdictions.

== Security police around the world ==
=== Australia ===
The RAAF Security Police is responsible for base security and policing the RAAF and they work closely with the Airfield Defence Guards. The Military Working Dog Unit also provides a further security function.

Most state police force in Australia employs a team of officers known as Protective Services Officers (PSOs). Stationed in and around public or government buildings, these PSOs are armed (to varying degrees) and wear slightly different uniforms. They are also called upon by regular police officers if the need arises. They generally undergo training at the state police college and share many resources. Some police officers have used the PSO path as a stepping stone to their current roles.

In New South Wales, an armed internal unit of the New South Wales Police Force is staffed by special constables who hold identical powers and immunities of police officers at the rank of constable. Special constables wear similar uniforms to police officers, carry arms and appointments and are issued warrant cards and badges. Special constables provide security services to select government and police complexes.

=== Germany ===
The Polizei beim Deutschen Bundestag (Polizei DBT, commonly known as Bundestagspolizei) is the smallest and least known police agency in Germany. It is responsible for the protection of the premises of the Bundestag in Berlin. Because the chief of the Bundestagspolizei is the president of the Bundestag (Federal Parliament of Germany) and not the minister of the interior, it can not be called a federal police agency. The number of their officers is not published yet. The Bundestagspolizei recruit their staff from all German police agencies.

=== Hong Kong ===
A special division of the Hong Kong Police Force, known as the Airport Security Unit (ASU), has been engaged by airports in Hong Kong (HK), to provide security services. These personnel have higher fitness standards and are issued with heavier firepower, than ordinary HK police officers.

=== India ===
The Central Industrial Security Force (CISF) is the primary federal security police agency of India. It has a strength of more than 365,000 personnel and is responsible for protecting over 300 government industries, 66 of the 137 civilian airports of India and all the 13 major seaports of India. It also protects the Delhi Metro, the Visva-Bharti University, certain Indian Space Research Organization (ISRO) buildings and 11 private establishments. In addition to this, it also provides consultancy services for more than 150 government and private establishments.

The Railway Protection Force (RPF) is responsible for protecting the Indian Railways and ensuring safety of citizens in trains. It has a strength of around 75,000 officers.

The Defence Security Corps (DSC) protects military installations and property belonging to the Ministry of Defence (MoD).

In addition, many states may have their own police units or government agencies responsible for providing security for industries not protected by the CISF. These include various State Industrial Security Forces (SISF).

=== Japan ===
In Japan, security police, also known as "SP" are law enforcement officers that provide security for domestic and foreign dignitaries. Their role in dignitary protection is similar to that of the United States Secret Service.

=== Malaysia ===
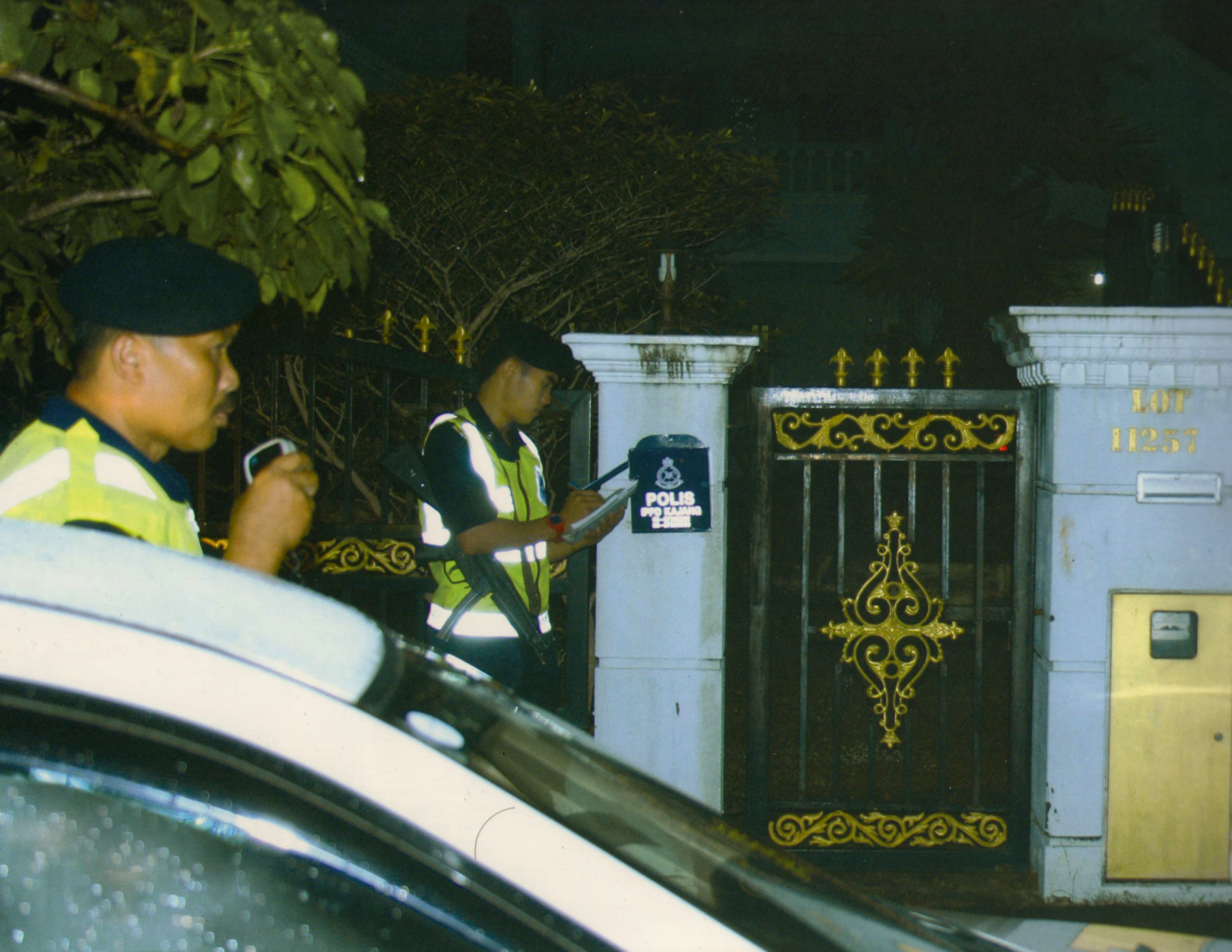
Malaysia - Police patrol personnel monitoring on the residence of VIP property. The police patrol mobile unit is a part of the C4-i implementation system.

The Royal Malaysia Police are generally responsible for protecting and policing the airports, seaports and government sites in Malaysia. Unlike several other countries, there is no state police for individual states.

=== Portugal ===
The Navy Establishments Police (Portuguese: Polícia dos Estabelecimentos da Marinha) is a small security police force responsible for protecting several of the facilities of the Portuguese Navy, including the navy central administration buildings, the Lisbon Naval Base and the Navy Museum.

The Navy Establishments Police is a non-military service, in contrast with the Naval Police (Polícia Naval) which is the Portuguese Navy's military police.

=== South Africa ===
During the 1960s the South African Security Police were known for detaining and interrogating members of the public, often leading to the victims death or disappearance, especially in the height of the Apartheid era.

=== Sri Lanka ===
During the 1990s the Sri Lanka Police created a sub unit with its members known as police security assistants. They were mostly limited to protection of police and governmental facilities.

=== Sweden ===
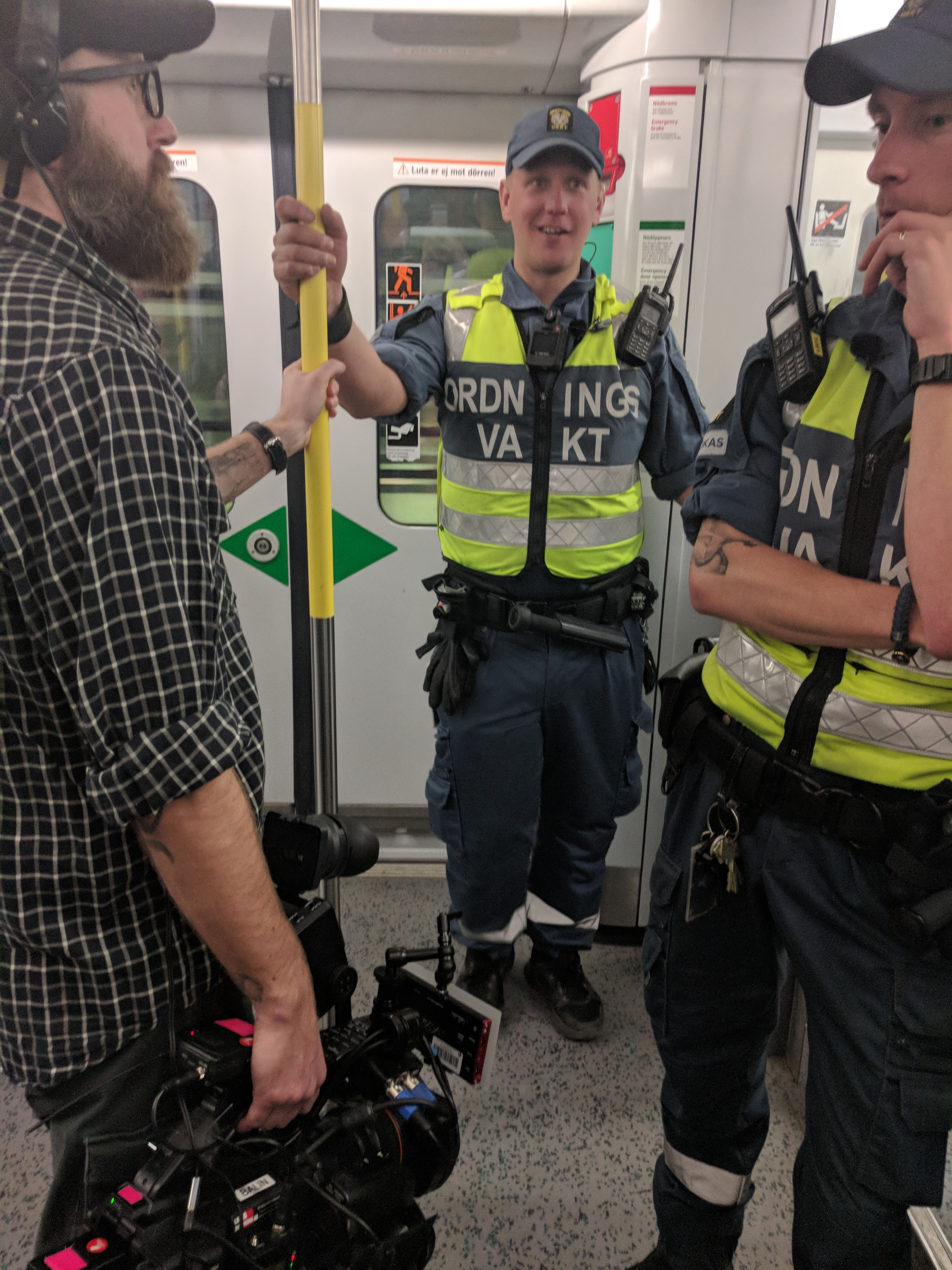
Swedish ordningsvakt in the Stockholm Metro

An ordningsvakt (”order-guard”) is a person deputized by the Swedish Police Authority to act as a law enforcement officer with limited police powers. Their main mission is to assist in maintaining public order.

An ordningsvakt may carry a baton, firearm, and handcuffs, may use a police dog, and is authorized to use force if necessary to maintain order. An ordningsvakt may reject, remove and, if necessary, detain, a person who disturbs the public order in his area of responsibility. He may also detain persons suffering from alcohol intoxication, seize alcoholic beverages, make a citizen's arrest (as everyone else), seize evidence after a citizen's arrest, and search a detained person. Detained persons and evidence are to be turned over to the police, who has a general command authority over him. An ordningsvakt carries a special badge, and, since 2012, wears a standardized uniform (irrespective of employer).

In February 2021, there were 7,830 persons deputized as ordningsvakter in Sweden. Of these, about 4,100 were employed by security companies while the rest had personal assignments from private or public clients. Previously, the assignments were mostly on a persona basis keeping public order at public events of a short duration such as soccer games and dances.

Nowadays they also serve as employees of security firms on a permanent basis in the Stockholm Metro, in courts and at public meetings in municipalities and regions. The number of sworn police officers in Sweden were at about the same time 20,942.

=== Taiwan ===
The special police (保安警察, Bao-an Jingcha) is known as the Security Police of Taiwan.

=== United Kingdom ===
==== Northern Ireland ====
The Northern Ireland Security Guard Service (not to be confused with MOD Police or MPGS) is a civilian armed guard service in which all civilian security officers are armed. They provide security at Ministry of Defence establishments in Northern Ireland.

The Belfast International Airport Constabulary is a small, armed, specialised police force responsible for policing Belfast International Airport, Northern Ireland.

=== United States ===
In the United States, the laws concerning peace officers vary widely from federal / state / city. Each state legislature with approval from the governor has the ability to modify the powers of peace officers in their state through legislation.

==== Federal ====
Most of the federal government's uniformed police officers are security police who primarily serve to protect federal property and personnel. An example is the Federal Protective Service who protect federal buildings and the various agencies of the Department of Defense Police in protecting military installations and properties.

==== By states ====
Some major cities such as Washington, D.C., Los Angeles, San Francisco and Boston have a security police service separate from their city police. These may be employees of a public agency or private contractors.

===== California =====
In California, peace officer powers are granted by the California Penal Code under a number of different code sections. Cities, counties and special districts are authorized to form their own law enforcement agencies. Peace officer training is regulated by a state agency, Peace Officer Standards and Training or POST. This training can consist of as little as a 40-hour PC 832 course (for park rangers, probation officers or fire investigators who might make an arrest in the course of their duties), or as much as a 700-hour POST Basic Academy (for entry level peace officers).

Security guards (including off duty peace officers) may only carry firearms in private employment if licensed by the state licensing authority, the Bureau of Security and Investigative Services. Persons regularly employed by public agencies as security guards, however, may be exempt from BSIS regulation, if they have completed POST-certified training in accordance with PC 832 or other penal code sections. However, security guards employed by a private employer are still regulated by BSIS even though the client may be a public agency.

====== Orange County ======
Orange County Sheriff's Department special officers (SSOs) are duly-appointed California "public officers," defined by California Penal Code (PC) 836.5, which grants public officers the authority to "...arrest a person without a warrant whenever the officer or employee has reasonable cause to believe that the person to be arrested has committed a misdemeanor in the presence of the officer or employee that is a violation of a statute or ordinance that the officer or employee has the duty to enforce." The statute additionally grants them powers to write summons and tickets.

SSOs are designated public officers by California PC section 831.4. (a) (1). This statute additionally authorizes them to carry firearms in the course of their duties. SSOs provide citation enforcement and general security and law enforcement services for the department in connection with the county bus system, airport, the operations of the local courts and the custody of local prisoners.

SSOs attend a 16-week training academy at the Orange County Sheriff's Regional Training Academy that instructs new officers on laws of arrest, firearms training, arrest and control techniques, physical fitness, field and patrol tactics, first responder medical training, and corrections-custody training.

From 2016 to 2020, their right to carry concealed off-duty under their employment status was stripped. However, in December 2020, an agreement was brokered between the OCSD sheriff and the SSOs' union; SSOs would be provided identification cards identical to "sworn OCSD deputy sheriffs" which would identify them as either "law enforcement" or as "honorably retired law enforcement," as appropriate, and would identify them as personnel with "statutory arrest authority." While this would not confer upon SSOs California peace officer status, nor would it permit them to carry concealed off-duty under the color of California law, it would technically permit them to carry concealed off-duty under federal law (LEOSA), as their new identification cards meets the requirement to carry under the auspices of LESOA.

====== Los Angeles ======
In the Los Angeles metropolitan area, there are numerous examples of security police with different levels of authority and responsibility.

- Los Angeles County Sheriff's Department - employs Security assistants (security officer I) and Security officers (security officer II) who assist deputy sheriffs in the protection of various county government facilities. The LASD absorbed the Los Angeles County Office of Public Safety on June 30, 2010.
  - Security assistants are assigned to the Transit Services Bureau serve as fare inspectors. Security assistants and security officers assigned to the Court Services Division provide weapons screening and general security of the county's superior and municipal courts. Security officers assigned to the Community College Division provide campus security to the county's community colleges. Additionally, security officers may also be assigned to provide security at other county facilities.
  - Sheriff's security officers in compliance with applicable laws and regulations, such as peace officer ("POST") training, have limited peace officer powers while on duty and are outside the authority of the state security guard licensing agency, the Bureau of Security and Investigative Services (BSIS) with respect to their work for the county.
- Los Angeles County Metropolitan Transportation Authority - transit security officers are uniformed, 836.5 (a) PC public officers, who serve the MTA (Metro) by providing security for critical transportation infrastructure and internal revenue protection. Transit security officers undergo a selection process that is similar to that for police (including an identical background investigation, as well as a psychological review and physical agility test), as well as an 800-hour internal training program and POST-certified arrest and firearms course.

===== New Orleans =====
The City of New Orleans Department of Police in accordance with New Orleans Home Rule Charter section 4-502 (2) (a) (b) and New Orleans Municipal Code 17-271 MCS 90–86, deputizes armed security officers, private investigators, college campus police, city, state, and federal agencies, within the city limits, with limited police powers as New Orleans Police special officers.

New Orleans Municipal Code 17-271 MCS 30-1122 states that it shall be unlawful for any person to act as an armed guard unless they are a peace officer. Louisiana R.S. 40:1379.1 (b) states that the special officer, when performing those tasks requiring a special officer's commission, shall have the same powers and duties as a peace officer. Special officers may make arrests for felony or misdemeanor offenses on the property or area they are to protect, patrol, or in relation to their direct assignment. The special officer, when making an arrest, may pat down the arrested subject for weapons. Special officers are to turn over arrested subjects and pertaining evidence to a New Orleans Police officer. Special officers are to honor all subpoenas on arrest made and appear in court to testify. Special officers, when not on a particular assignment, are regarded as private citizens and have no police powers. However, special officers still may make arrests for a felony, whether in or out of their presence, while not on a particular assignment, under Louisiana Law CCRP art.214 arrest by private person; when lawful.

=== Venezuela ===
The Internal Security Division is a security police unit of the Bolivarian Service of National Intelligence. Dressed with black berets and armed with M16s and M4s. This unit provides security at counterintelligence territorial bases and other facilities. They have police powers.

== Obsolete uses ==
=== Finland ===
- The Suojelupoliisi or Finnish Security and Intelligence Service used the English title of “Finnish Security Police” until 2010. The name change was to emphasize its state security functions over any internal policing tasks it may have.

=== Nazi Germany ===
- The Sicherheitspolizei, often abbreviated as SiPo, was a term used in Nazi Germany to describe the state political and criminal investigation security agencies. It was made up by the combined forces of the Gestapo (secret state police) and the Kripo (criminal police) between 1936 and 1939. As a formal agency, the SiPo was folded into the RSHA in 1939, but the term continued to be used informally until the end of the Third Reich.
- The Reichssicherheitsdienst (RSD) was the security police assigned to protect dignitaries.

=== United States ===
- Security police is a term once used for the United States Air Force Security Forces, who function as the military police of the United States Air Force.

== See also ==
- Border guard
- Gendarme
- Traffic guard
- List of protective service agencies
  - Provost
- United States Air Force Security Forces
- Department security in Russia

== General references ==
- "A NEW MEMBER OF THE LASD FAMILY" by John Herrera, Star News, September 2006
- The Privatization of Police in America: An Analysis and Case Study. McFarland & Company, 2003.
