= Park police =

Security police protecting parks

Park police are a type of security police who function as a full-service law enforcement agency with responsibilities and jurisdiction in park areas primarily located in cities and other urban areas. In addition to performing the normal crime prevention, investigation, and apprehension functions of a municipal police force, the park police may be responsible for policing other public areas and may also share law enforcement jurisdiction with a force of park rangers tasked with the same law enforcement powers and responsibilities.

== See also ==
- Park rangers
- List of protective service agencies
- List of law enforcement agencies in the United Kingdom, Crown Dependencies and British Overseas Territories#Parks police
- Category:Park police departments of the United States
