= Ordningsvakt =

Deputized security guards in Sweden

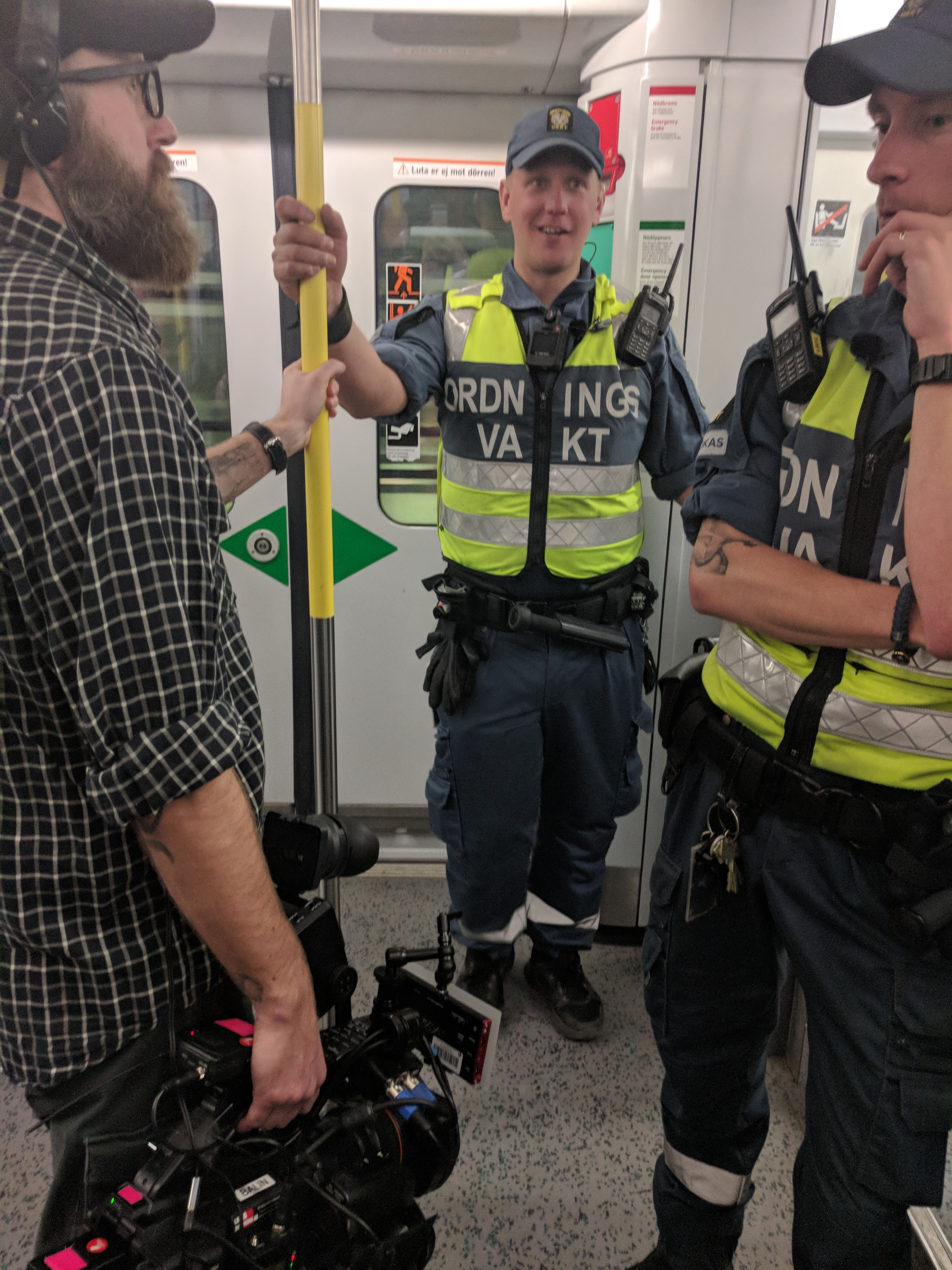
Swedish ordningsvakt in the Stockholm Metro

An ordningsvakt (public order officer) is a person deputized by the Swedish Police Authority to act as a law enforcement officer with limited police powers. Their main mission is to assist in maintaining public order.

== Functions ==
An ordningsvakt is required to carry an expanding baton and handcuffs, and may under certain circumstances be authorised to carry a firearm or use a police dog. The ordningsvakt serves under the direct (though often theoretical) control of the police authority, and is authorized to use force if necessary to maintain order. An ordningsvakt may eject, remove and, if necessary, detain, a person who disturbs the public order in their area of responsibility. They may also detain persons suffering from alcohol intoxication or are disturbing the peace, or seize alcoholic beverages. They also retain the powers available to everyone in Sweden to make a citizen's arrest, seize evidence after a citizen's arrest, and search a detained person; detained persons and seized evidence are to be turned over to the police. A Swedish security guard (väktare) has much less authority than an ordningsvakt.

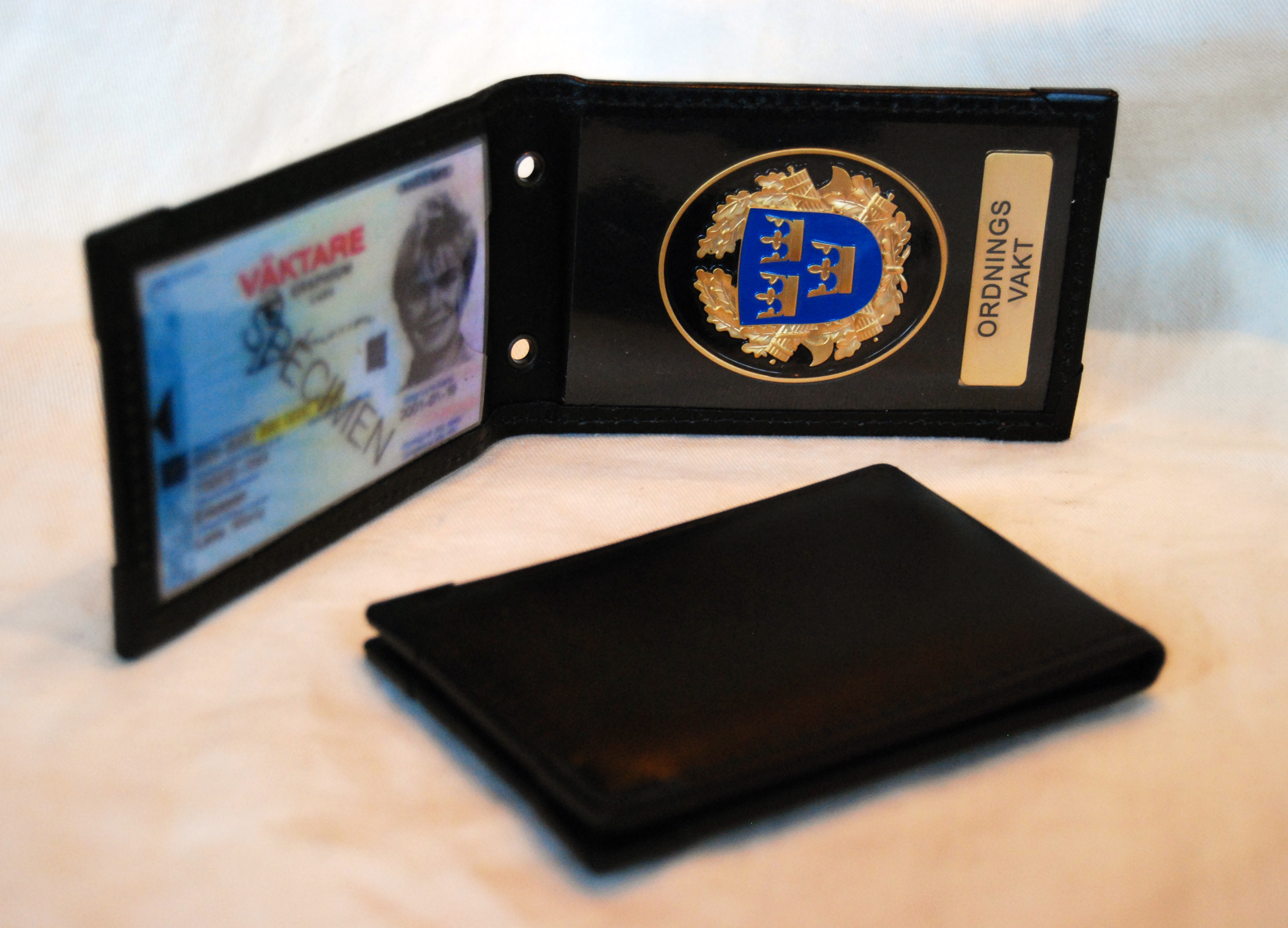
Ordningsvakt badge and credentials

An ordningsvakt is denoted since 2012 by a uniform in a standardized color and marked with a regulated set of uniform patches and printing. They carry a card showing their authorization, and many purchase credential wallets featuring the state emblem and the text "ORDNINGSVAKT"; this badge is not, however, a requirement or officially issued.

== Strength ==
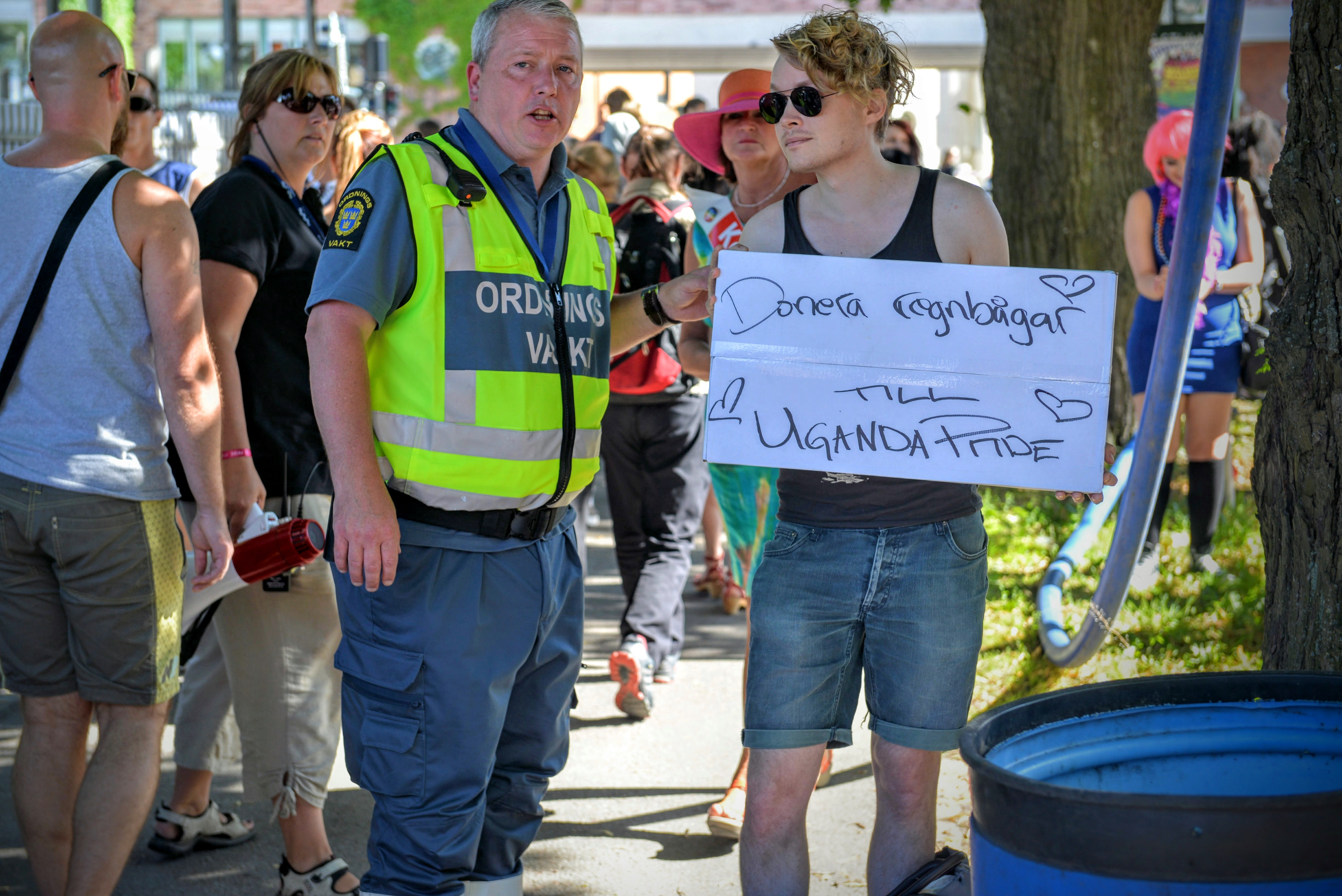
Ordningsvakter at the Stockholm Pride Parade in 2015

In February 2021, there were 7,830 persons deputized as ordningsvakter in Sweden. Of these, about 4,100 were employed by security companies while the rest had freelance assignments for private or public clients. Previously, the assignments were mostly on a freelance basis keeping public order at public events of a short duration such as soccer games and dances. Nowadays they also serve as employees of security firms on a permanent basis in the Stockholm Metro, in courts and at public meetings in municipalities and regions. The number of sworn police officers in Sweden were at about the same time 20,942.

== Uniforms ==
The National Police Board issuing a new version of FAP 692-1 (RPSFS 2010:8), it was decided that a common uniform should be introduced for all law enforcement officers in Sweden. The uniform is similar to the police's working uniform with the difference that it is in a lighter blue-grey color and that all garments lack shoulder straps. The color code of the uniform is NCS 7015-R90B. The uniform should make it easier to identify public order officers and clarify their position of authority as adjuncts to the police.

The uniform selection is broadly laid out in the FAP 670-1 regulation and includes jackets with retroreflective markings around the bottom of the jacket and sleeves; trousers with leg pockets and retroreflective material around the lower part of the legs; straight trousers which can be fitted with leg pockets; overalls with retroreflective material around the lower part of the sleeves and legs; a selection of shirts, polo shirts, and sweaters. (The designs depicted in the regulation are broad specifications, and compliant garments are manufactured in a multitude of models by several different companies.) Shirts and jackets are fitted with patches featuring the function designation ("ORDNINGSVAKT") and the national emblem on the chest, and patches combining the function designation and national emblem on the sleeves (accompanied, where appropriate, by the company logo). Compliant high-visibility garments are also manufactured, featuring a yellow base with the retroreflective text "ORDNINGSVAKT" on a blue panel on the front and back. The regulations allow a selection of headgear, including a formal side cap, a baseball-style cap, a choice of winter hats, and a protective helmet for crowd control situations.

== Insignia ==
The former metal badge assembly (featuring the "ORDNINGSVAKT" function designation and the circular state emblem) is no longer worn with the uniform after 1 December 2012, having been replaced by fabric patches of a similar design complemented with sleeve patches. Where possible, garments are also printed with "ORDNINGSVAKT" on the back in retroreflective text. Fabric hat badges (similar to the sleeve patches but smaller) are worn on all headgear.

== See also ==
- Väktare – security guard
- Security police
