= Belfast Harbour =

Major maritime hub in Northern Ireland

Coordinates: 54°37′04″N 5°54′06″W

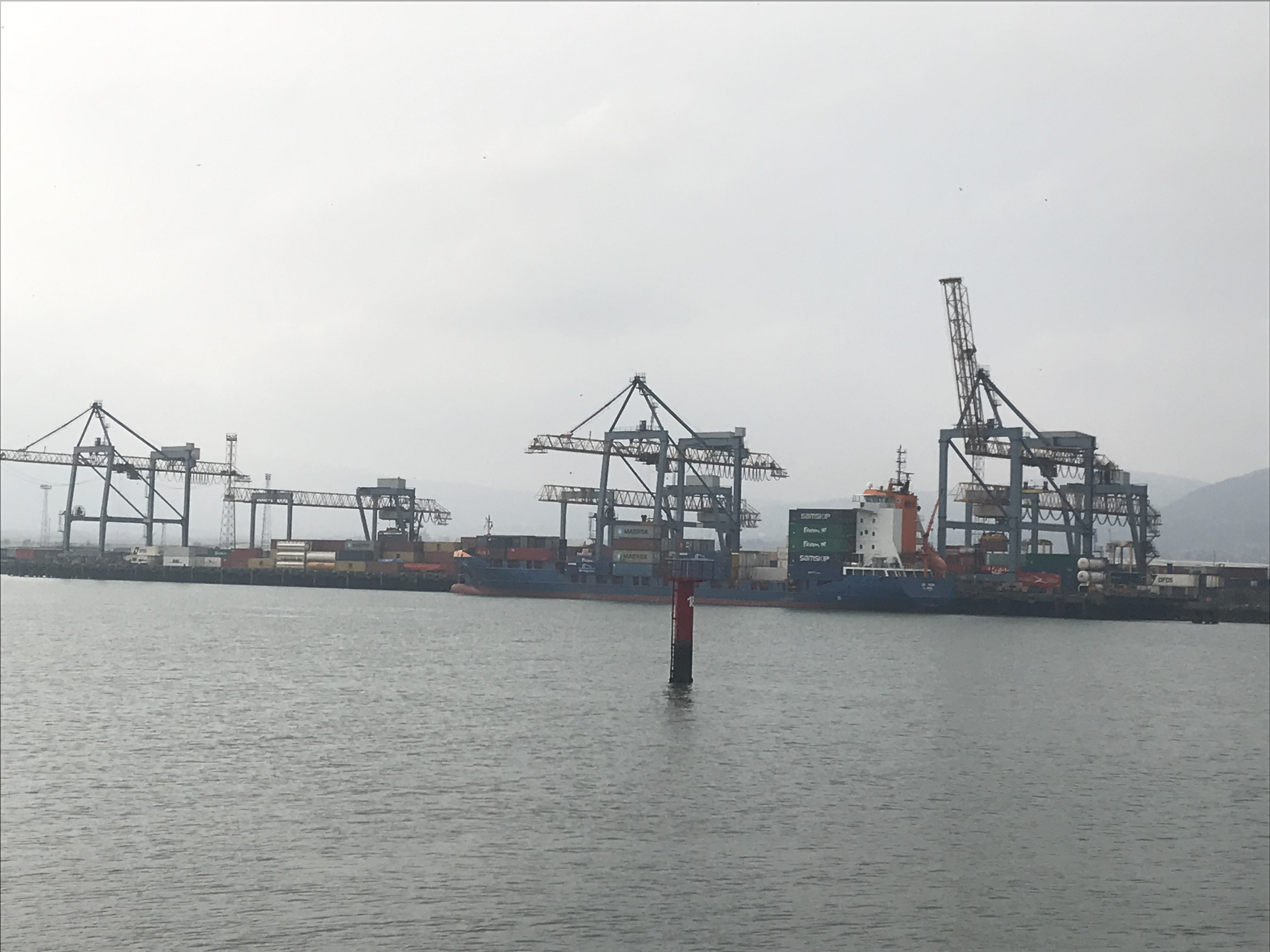
View of Belfast Container Terminal from Victoria Channel approach, April 2019

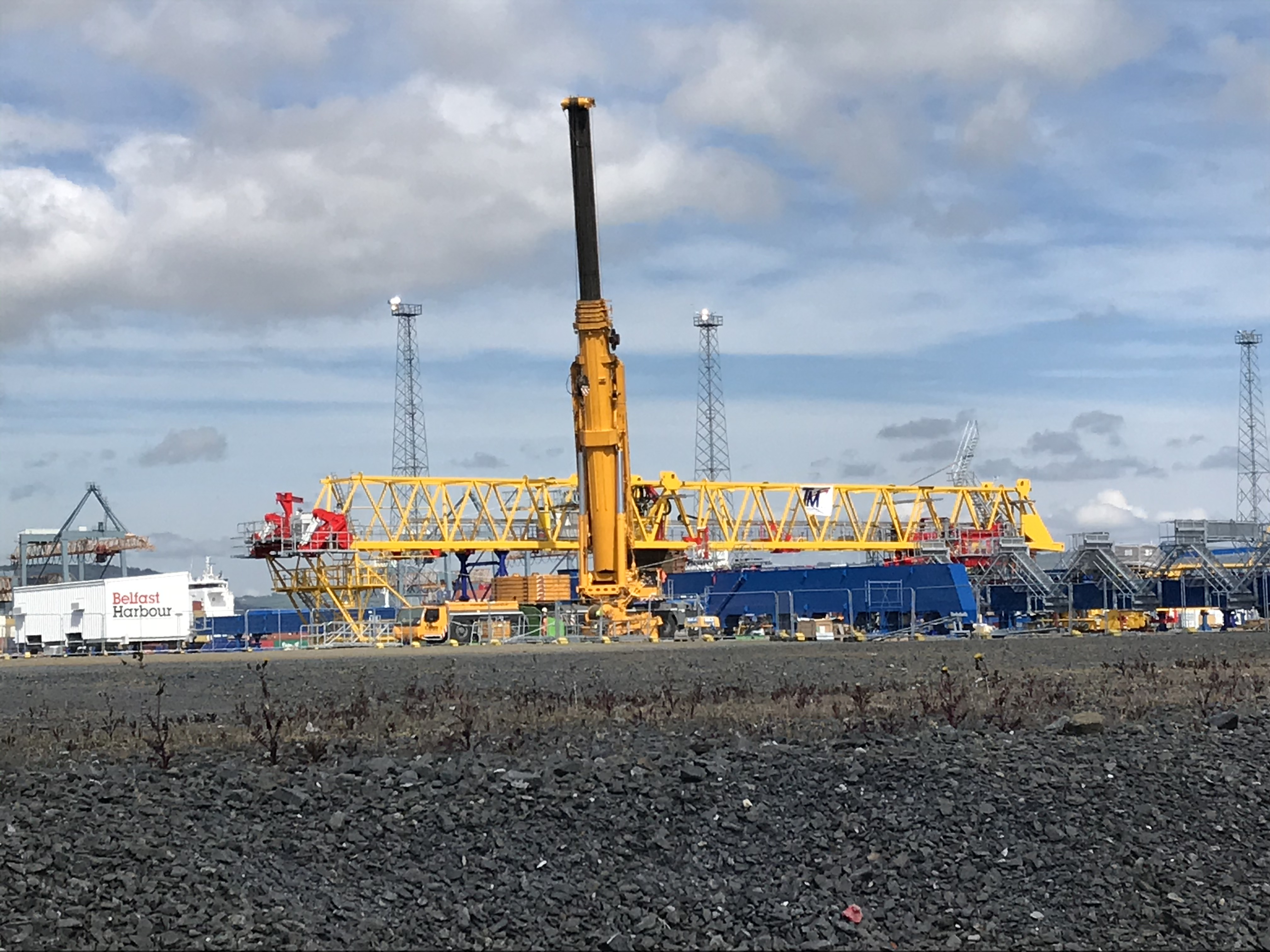
New Belfast Liebherr crane under assembly, May 2020

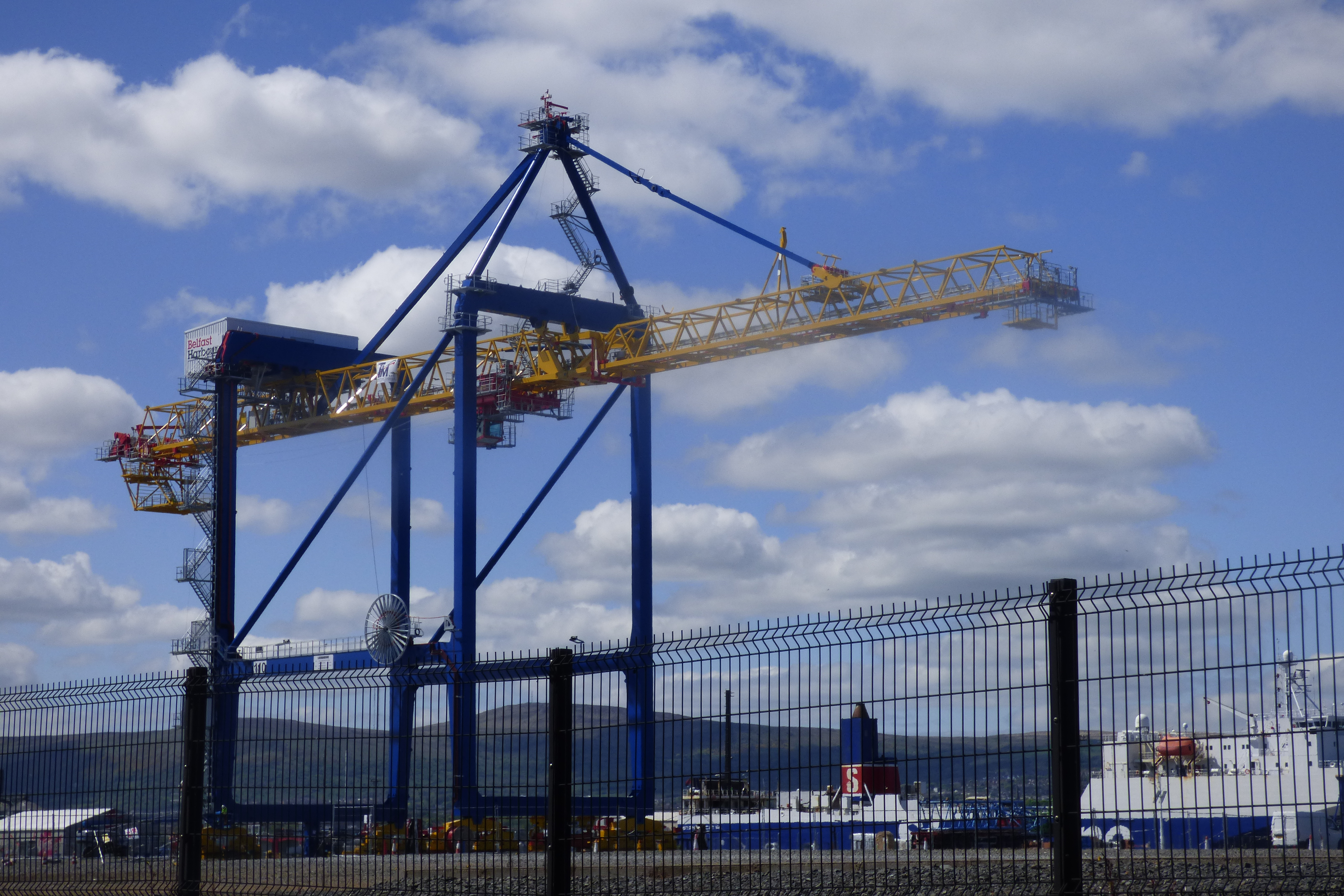
Newly assembled Liebherr gantry crane

Belfast Harbour is a major maritime hub in Belfast, Northern Ireland, handling 67% of Northern Ireland's seaborne trade and about 25% of the maritime trade of the entire island of Ireland. It is a vital gateway for raw materials, exports and consumer goods, and is also Northern Ireland's leading logistics and distribution hub.

The Belfast Harbour Estate is home to many well-known Northern Ireland businesses such as George Best Belfast City Airport, Harland and Wolff, Spirit AeroSystems, Odyssey, the Catalyst Inc, Titanic Quarter and Titanic Belfast. Over 700 firms employing 23,000 people are located within the estate.

Belfast is only one of two ports on the island of Ireland to handle a full range of cargoes, from freight vehicles to containers, dry, break and liquid bulk, as well as passenger services and cruise calls.

Belfast Harbour handled 23 million tonnes of cargo during 2015, similar to its throughput for 2014. The tonnages suggest a varying performance between sectors in the wider Northern Ireland economy.

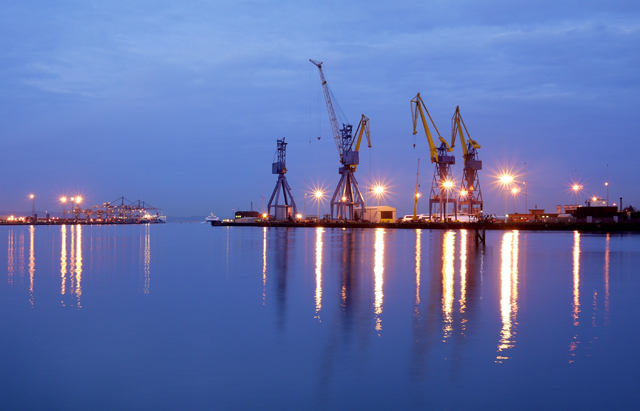
Belfast docks in 2009

== History ==
Belfast Harbour's origins date back to 1613 when a royal charter for the incorporation of Belfast specified the need for a wharf at the confluence of the rivers Lagan and Farset in what is modern-day Belfast's High Street.

In the 1840s Samuel Kelly started a coal commissions and grocer along the docks. When he died in 1877, his son, John Kelly, took over and named it John Kelly's Coal Company, he would expand his fleet of ships and continue to import coal from various coal boats. John Kelly died in 1904, his son, Sir Samuel Kelly would drive the company to new heights. Sir Samuel Kelly created it was a limited company in 1911 as John Kelly Limited. They are now known as Kelly's Fuels in the 1990s after the coal industry began to fall.

Records show that by 1663 there were 29 vessels owned in Belfast with a total tonnage of 1,100 tonnes. Trade continued to expand throughout the century, to the extent that the original quay was enlarged, to accommodate the increasing number of ships.

Port and Ballast Office of Belfast Act 1785
- Act of Parliament
- Parliament of Ireland
- Long title: An Act to amend an act entitled "An Act for cleansing the ports, harbours and rivers of the city of Cork, and of the towns of Galway, Sligo, Drogheda and Belfast, and for erecting a ballast office in the said city, and each of the said towns."
- Citation: 25 Geo. 3. c. 64 (I)
- Territorial extent: Ireland

Dates
- Royal assent: 7 September 1785
- Commencement: 20 January 1785 (Note: Start of session.)

Other legislation
- Amends: Ballast Offices Act 1729

Text of statute as originally enacted

By the early 18th century Belfast had replaced Carrickfergus as the most important port in Ulster and additional accommodation was necessary. A number of privately owned wharves were subsequently constructed on reclaimed land. Throughout the century trade continued to expand as Belfast assumed a greater role in the trading activities of the country as a whole. In 1785 the Parliament of Ireland passed the Port and Ballast Office of Belfast Act 1785 (25 Geo. 3. c. 64 (I)) to deal with the town's burgeoning port. As a result, a new body was constituted: The Corporation for Preserving and Improving the Port and Harbour of Belfast, commonly called 'the Ballast Board'.

The Ballast Board took over the running of the port from the Belfast Corporation. The Ballast Office was established in premises on the site of the present Customs House.

Although already well established by this stage, the port remained disadvantaged by the natural restrictions of shallow water, bends in the channel approach and inadequate quays. Most vessels were forced to lighten their loads downstream at Garmoyle before they could dock at the quays and complete their discharge. This cost importers extra handling charges and the need for additional Customs supervision.

Belfast Port and Harbour Act 1837
- Act of Parliament
- Parliament of the United Kingdom
- Long title: An Act for the Formation of a new Cut or Channel, and for otherwise more effectually improving the Port and Harbour of Belfast.
- Citation: 7 Will. 4 & 1 Vict. c. lxxvi

Dates
- Royal assent: 30 June 1837

Other legislation
- Repealed by: Belfast Port and Harbour Act 1843

Status: Repealed

Text of statute as originally enacted

These problems, together with an increasing volume of trade, led to the Parliament of the United Kingdom passing the Belfast Port and Harbour Act 1837 (7 Will. 4 & 1 Vict. c. lxxvi). This reconstituted the board and gave it powers to improve the port, through the formation of a new channel. Initial work on straightening the river commenced in 1839 and by 1841 the first bend had been eliminated. Thus, beginning the creation of what was to become known as the Victoria Channel. The Victoria Channel was completed in 1849. The Clarendon Dock opened in 1851 and the Dufferin and Spencer Docks opened in 1897.

Belfast Port and Harbour Act 1843
- Act of Parliament
- Parliament of the United Kingdom
- Long title: An Act to amend two several Acts for improving the Port and Harbour of Belfast.
- Citation: 6 & 7 Vict. c. lvi

Dates
- Royal assent: 27 June 1843

Other legislation
- Repealed by: Belfast Harbour Act 1847

Belfast Harbour Act 1847
- Act of Parliament
- Parliament of the United Kingdom
- Long title: An Act for the Amendment of the Port and Harbour Acts of Belfast, for making further Improvements and New Works there, and for the Amendment of the Belfast and Cavehill Railway and Belfast Town Improvement Acts.
- Citation: 10 & 11 Vict. c. lii

Dates
- Royal assent: 21 June 1847

Text of statute as originally enacted

The Belfast Harbour Act 1847 (10 & 11 Vict. c. lii) repealed previous acts and led to the formation of the Belfast Harbour Commissioners. This new body, with much wider powers, completed the second stage of the new channel two years later. From that time the commissioners have developed and improved the port, reclaiming land to accommodate new quays, new trades and changes in shipping and cargo-handling technology.

Belfast Harbour Commissioners Act 1871
- Act of Parliament
- Parliament of the United Kingdom
- Long title: An Act to explain and amend certain enactments contained in the Commissioners Clauses Act, 1847, incorporated with the Belfast Harbour Act, 1847, and for other purposes.
- Citation: 34 & 35 Vict. c. xli

Dates
- Royal assent: 16 June 1871

Text of statute as originally enacted

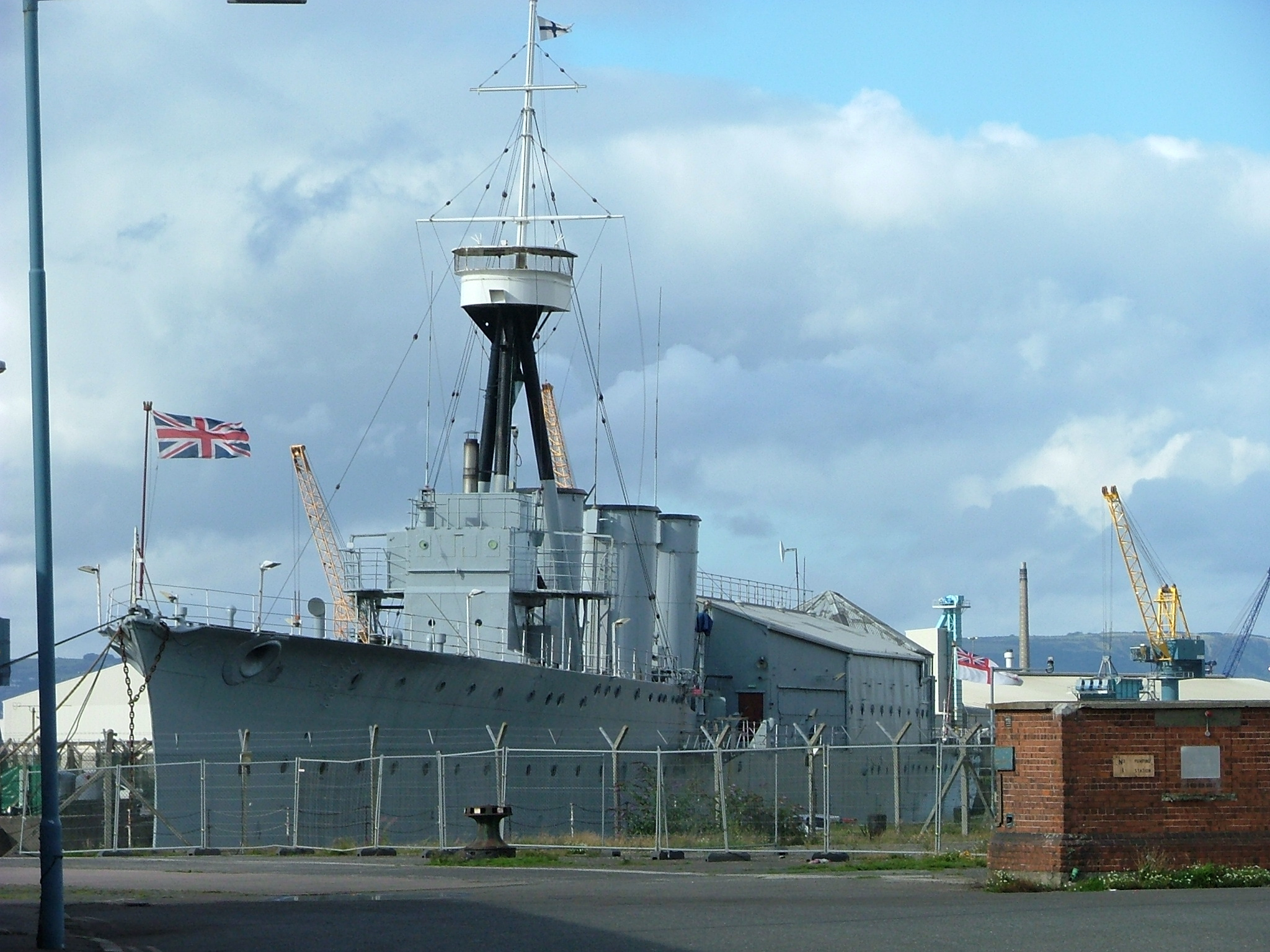
HMS Caroline is a First World War light cruiser permanently berthed in Belfast Harbour

During World War II the Port of Belfast was used by the Royal Navy as the home base for many of the ships that escorted Atlantic and Russian convoys including Captain-class frigates of the 3rd Escort Group. HMS Caroline is a First World War light cruiser permanently berthed in Belfast Harbour. It served as the training ship for some 130 reservists as the headquarters for the Ulster Division Royal Naval Reserve until it was decommissioned in 2011. After extensive restoration work, HMS Caroline opened to the public in June 2016 as a museum as part of the National Museum of the Royal Navy.

Belfast West Power Station (formerly Power Station West) was opened in 1961 on a site in the port subleased to the Belfast Corporation Electricity Department. This subleased is today held by Northern Ireland Electricity. The station continued to generate electricity until its closure in March 2002. On 6 July 2007 the station's three 240 ft (73 m) chimneys were demolished by controlled explosion and the remainder of the site was cleared in the following months. The site continues to be managed by NIE on behalf of the utility regulator which has stated that the various conditions of the lease "suggest that the best use for the site going forward is electrical generation. The site is currently used for coal storage and sorting "

== Management ==
Belfast Harbour is one of the UK's many "trust ports" and is an independent statutory body. Trust ports are not owned by government; they are obliged to operate independently and on a commercial basis. Its board – known as Belfast Harbour Commissioners – is appointed by Northern Ireland's Department for Regional Development on the basis of open public advertisement.

The commissioners currently number fifteen and are led by a chairman. The positions are remunerated and are for terms of three years. All of the commissioners with the exception of the chief executive are non-executives.

=== Board members ===
The current commissioners as of February 2020 include David Dobbin CBE as chairman and Joe O’Neill as CEO.

=== Law enforcement ===
The port is patrolled by the Belfast Harbour Police, which is one of the oldest constabularies in the British Isles, dating back over 160 years.

In recent times the service has faced new challenges as the relocation of marine facilities to the seaward end of the port have created opportunities to develop new residential, commercial and public spaces. In addition to traditional port users the Belfast Harbour Police now provide a range of policing services to tenants, residents and visitors who frequent the harbour estate.

== Operations ==
Isle of Man Steam Packet route map

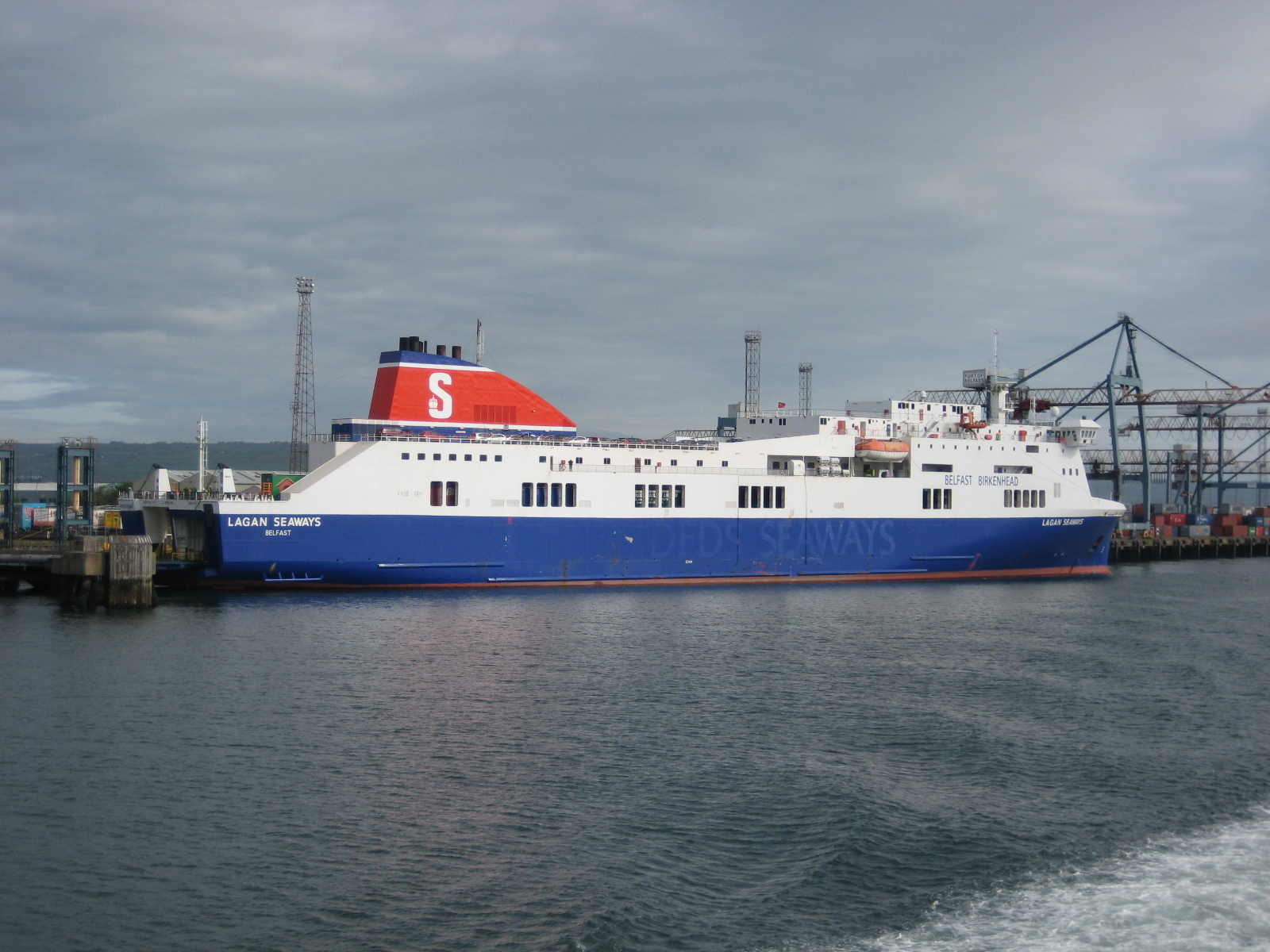
MS Stena Lagan as Lagan Seaways in Belfast

=== Freight ===
In 2014 476,000 freight vehicles used the Port, a 2.2% increase over 2013. By 2019, Stena Line's Belfast-Loch Ryan route, Belfast-Birkenhead and Belfast-Heysham service together carried 542,000 freight vehicles were handled; a record number for nine consecutive years.

125,000 containers and 6.0 million tonnes of bulk cargo were handled in 2009. By 2019, bulk cargo throughput had increased to 9.9 million tonnes and the number of containers handled at Victoria Terminal 3 increased to more than 130,000 units, carrying over 2.1 million tonnes of goods. The total trade tonnage in 2019 exceeded 24 million tonnes for the second successive year.

In 1993, container operations moved from York Dock and Herdman Channel to Victoria Terminal 3; a new terminal equipped with three Liebherr ship-to-shore gantry cranes and three rail-mounted stacking gantry cranes. This terminal was operated by Coastal Container Line Limited; a subsidiary of the Mersey Docks and Harbour Company; later Peel Ports Belfast. VT3 served feeder traffic from Rotterdam, Le Havre, Antwerp, Felixstowe, Southampton and Liverpool.

In 2006, a rival service operated by a subsidiary of the Irish Continental Group; Belfast Container Terminal, began to operate a service to Antwerp and Rotterdam from the Herdman Channel using a mobile ship-to-shore crane and three straddle carriers.

In 2015, Peel Ports lost the tender to operate the service at VT3 to the Irish Continental Group. Belfast Container Terminal began to operate solely from VT3 by September 2015; initially for a five-year period.

In October 2019, Belfast Harbour announced a £40million project to upgrade VT3 with eight new remote-controlled Kalmar rubber-tyres gantry cranes and two Liebherr ship-to-shore gantry cranes. Five of the new cranes were delivered in November 2019. The first two are expected to go into service in the first quarter of 2020. Major civil engineering works are underway to accommodate the new equipment

The first of the two new Liebherr ship-to-shore gantry cranes arrived in Belfast at the end of April 2020. This was discharged alongside the cruise ship berth on the County Down side of the Victoria Channel to be assembled. Assembly of gantry crane 101 was completed in May 2020. This crane was floated across the channel by barge in June 2020. The second Liebherr crane, 102, arrived in August 2020. These new Liebherr STS gantry cranes two of the three existing gantry cranes which have been on site since 1993.

=== Passenger services ===
1.4 million passengers used the port's ferry services in 2014. Routes from the Port of Belfast include:

- Stena Line to Cairnryan. Stena discontinued its operations to Stranraer in 2011 in favour of new ferries, MS Stena Superfast VII and MS Stena Superfast VIII, sailing to its new port at Cairnryan.
- Stena Line to Birkenhead. Stena bought this operation from DFDS, renaming the two ships MS Stena Lagan and MS Stena Mersey. In early 2020, the Stena Edda - the first of two new super ferries on the route - will go into service on this route. The Stena terminal at Victoria Terminal 2 has been upgraded to accommodate the larger vessels. The Stena Edda sailed into Belfast on 26 February 2020 to test the new facilities.

=== Ferry and rail connections ===
Connecting Belfast with Glasgow Central via using the coach link from Cairnryan. Trains run along the Glasgow South Western Line from Ayr to Glasgow Central.

Preceding station	Ferry	Following station
Ayr (via coach link from Cairnryan)	Stena Line; Ferry	Terminus (nearest stations York Street or Lanyon Place )
Liverpool	Stena Line; Ferry	Terminus (nearest stations York Street or Lanyon Place)

There is Metro bus Service 96 connecting with York Street onto the Derry~Londonderry Line and Belfast Suburban Rail network of Northern Ireland Railways.

=== Cruise ships ===
It is increasingly popular with cruise liners, with 2016 due to be the busiest cruise season in the city's history with over 145,000 passengers and crew due to visit, representing a 26% increase in visitor numbers compared with 2015.

The 2 cruise berths that are used are the Pollock dock, named after Northern Irish politician Hugh MacDowell Pollock, for smaller ships and the Stormont Wharf (deep water berth) for larger ships, The extended Stormont Wharf was opened on 30 June 2009 by the Grand Princess.

Pollock Dock: (Length 457m, depth 8.5m) Stormont Wharf (Length 177m, depth 10.2m)

=== Property ===
Belfast Harbour has extensive property interests covering about 1,950 acres (790 ha). 855 acres are used directly for port operations, 90 acres (360,000 m^{2}) are reserved for nature conservation and the remaining 1,005 are either leased or under negotiation.

==== Titanic Quarter ====
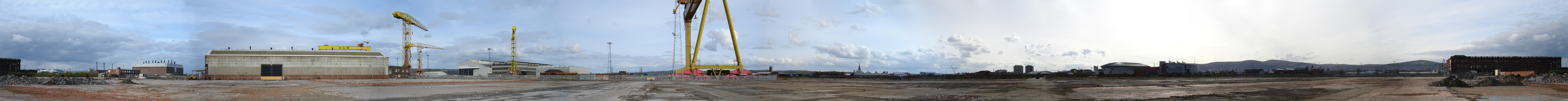
Panorama of the Titanic Quarter, showing the remaining Harland and Wolff buildings, the Samson and Goliath cranes and the Odyssey.

Belfast Harbour's largest property project is the Titanic Quarter, which is "co-promoted" with Titanic Quarter Limited.

==== Holywood Exchange ====
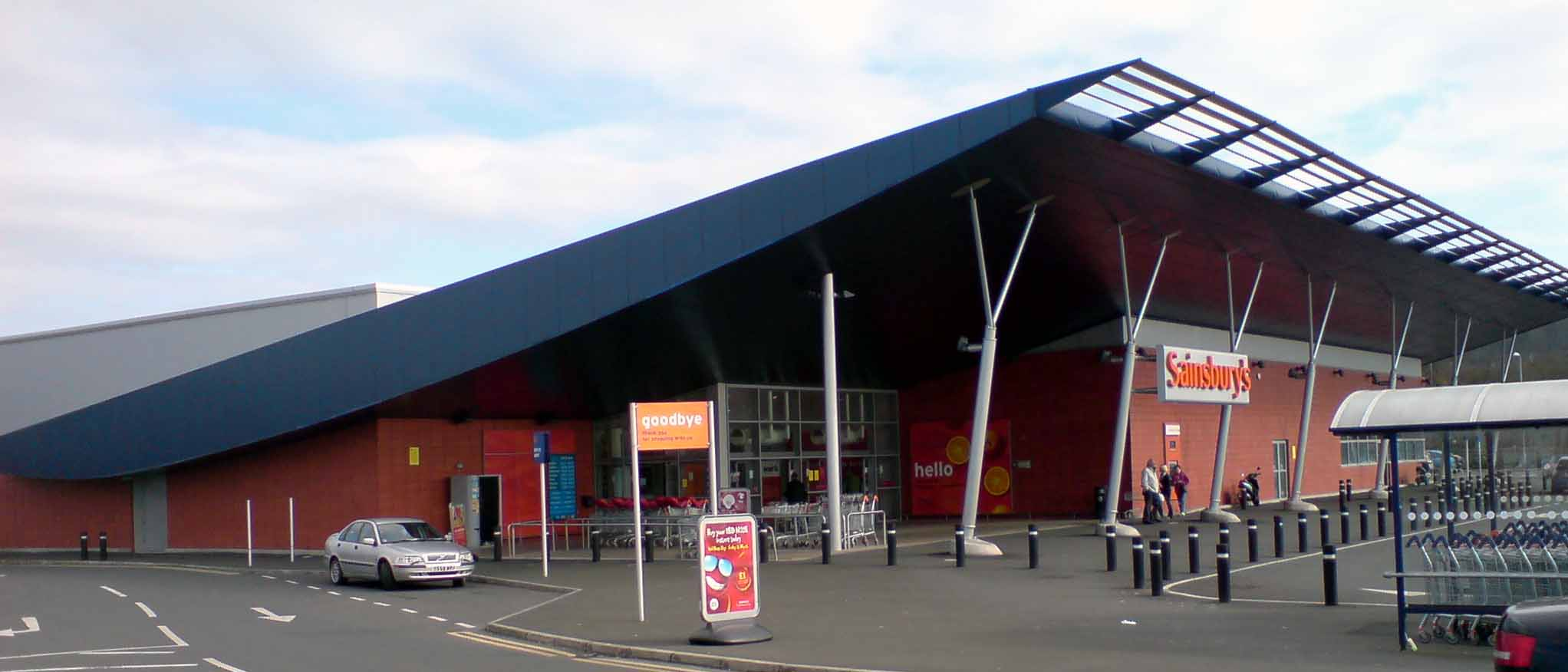
Sainsbury's at Holywood Exchange.

Belfast Harbour Commissioners and its partners made the first planning application for Holywood Exchange (previously known as D5 or Harbour Exchange) on 14 November 1995. Planning permission was granted three times and successfully challenged twice before construction commenced in December 2002; when completed the development consisted of an 11 unit 13,940 m^{2} (150,000 ft^{2}) retail warehouse centre, a Sainsbury's store and service station, and a B&Q store. A 29,000 m^{2} (312,000 ft^{2}) IKEA store opened on 13 December 2007.

==== City Quays ====
City Quays is a mixed-use commercial offices in City Quays 1 and City Quays 2 and includes shops, cafes, restaurants and other local services.

==== Other ====
The Odyssey Complex, which consists of the Odyssey Pavilion, SSE Arena Belfast and W5 is a large sports and entertainment centre in the Belfast Harbour Estate. The Odyssey arena and pavilion is built on land owned by The Odyssey Trust under a 150-year lease with Belfast Harbour Commissioners.

== Gallery ==
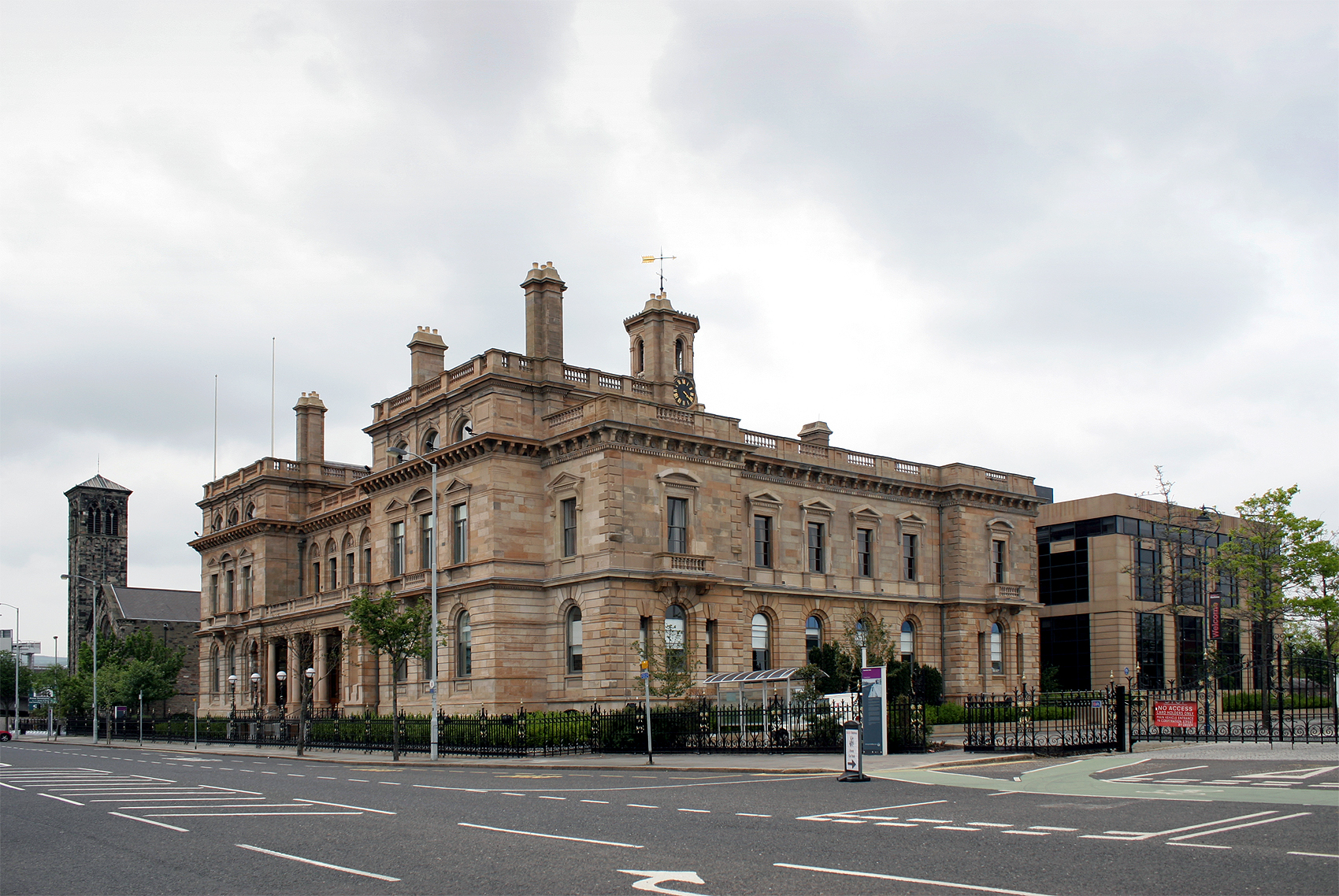
Harbour Commissioners' Office, Port of Belfast

== See also ==
- Belfast Lough
- Queen's Island
