= Belfast Harbour Police =

- Abbreviation: BHP
- Motto: ‘an effective, connected community police service’

Agency overview
- Formed: 1847
- Employees: 50

Jurisdictional structure
- Legal jurisdiction: Belfast Harbour Estate
- Governing body: Port of Belfast
- Constituting instrument: Harbours, Docks, and Piers Clauses Act 1847
- General nature: Local civilian police

Operational structure
- Overseen by: Belfast Harbour Corporation
- Headquarters: Milewater Basin, Dufferin Road, Belfast
- Police Officers: 40 (2024)
- Police Support Staffs: 10
- Agency executive: Chief Officer, Michael Daly

Facilities
- Stations: 1
- SUV/Motorcycles: 10

Website
- www.belfast-harbour.co.uk/harbour-estate-access/belfast-harbour-police

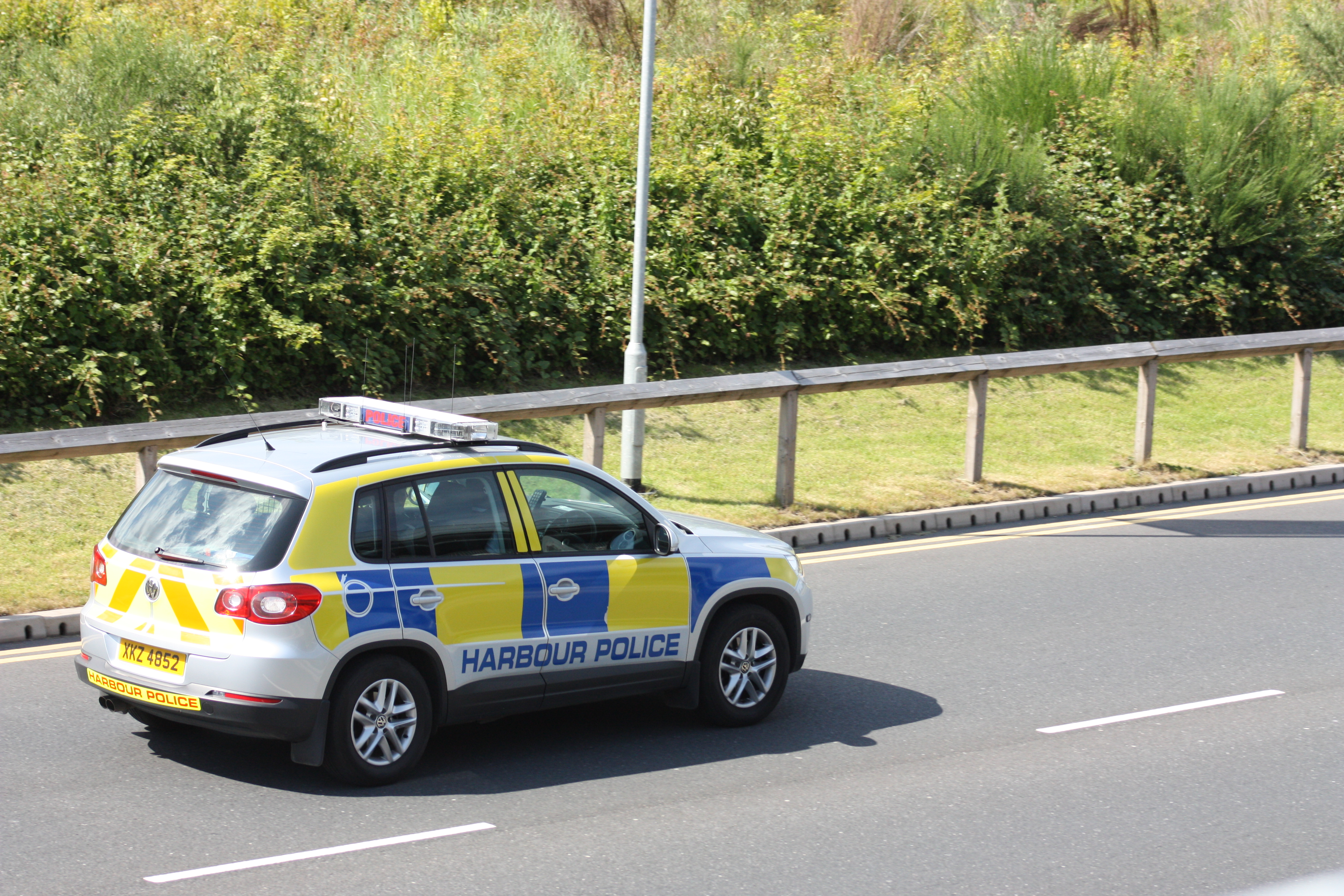
Belfast Harbour Police car, June 2010.

The Belfast Harbour Police, is a small, specialised ports police force, with responsibility for the Port of Belfast, Northern Ireland. It was founded in 1847, making it the oldest continuously-operating law enforcement agency on the island of Ireland.

== Powers ==
Officers of this force are sworn in as 'special constables' under section 79 of the Harbours, Docks, and Piers Clauses Act 1847. As a result, officers have the full powers of a constable on any land owned by the Belfast Harbour Authority and at any place within one mile (1.6 km) of any owned land. The extent of Belfast Harbour includes the George Best Belfast City Airport, though policing of the airport by the Harbour Police was discontinued in February 2009. The force consists of thirty constables, eight sergeants, one inspector, one chief officer and ten civilian support staff (2024). Whilst on duty, BHP officers are armed, which is believed to be a unique situation amongst the small number of privately owned ports police services across the United Kingdom. The service may also enforce the Belfast Harbour Commissioners' by-laws, giving them more powers specific to the harbour.

== Officers ==
Belfast Harbour Police consists of uniformed police officers incorporating five Sector Teams, a Roads Policing Unit (RPU) and a Criminal Justice Unit (CJU) who provide 24-hour cover throughout the 2,000-acre Harbour Estate, including almost 17 miles of roads. Their vehicles are equipped with Tracker stolen vehicle detection devices.

== Uniforms ==
Unlike the green uniforms worn by the Police Service of Northern Ireland, BHP officers wear a black and white uniform, similar to those worn by police officers in Great Britain. Also unlike the PSNI, BHP also uses the standard black and white police sillitoe tartan insignia on their forage caps and the rank insignia for the rank of sergeant incorporates the downturned chevrons, again similar to police agencies in Britain.

Any major or serious crime and incidents such as murder, acts of terrorism or armed robbery are the responsibility of the local territorial police force, the Police Service of Northern Ireland.

== Equipment ==
Like most Northern Ireland police or public security services, BHP officers are regularly armed and are equipped with the Glock 17, previously being equipped with six-shot revolvers. Officers also carry typical UK police equipment, including a radio, baton, and incapacitant spray.

== Vehicles ==
BHP use cars including Skoda Kodiaq SUVs, Kia Sportages, land Rover Freelanders and two BMW Motorcycles to patrol the harbour. Vehicles are equipped in typical UK police blue and yellow style "Battenberg" colour scheme, with blue lights and 'Harbour Police' wording.

There is also a police launch. This was manufactured by Redbay Boats in Cushendall, and also supports Belfast Harbour Police’s joint operations with Lagan Search and Rescue, PSNI and Border Force.

The ‘Bowstead’, is named after John Bowstead, the first Constable appointed to police the quays in Belfast in 1824.

== See also ==
- Law enforcement in the United Kingdom
- Police Service of Northern Ireland (PSNI)
- Northern Ireland Security Guard Service (NISGS)
- Northern Ireland Prison Service (HMP)
- Royal Ulster Constabulary (RUC)
